= Somerset Township, Jackson County, Illinois =

Somerset Township
- Township
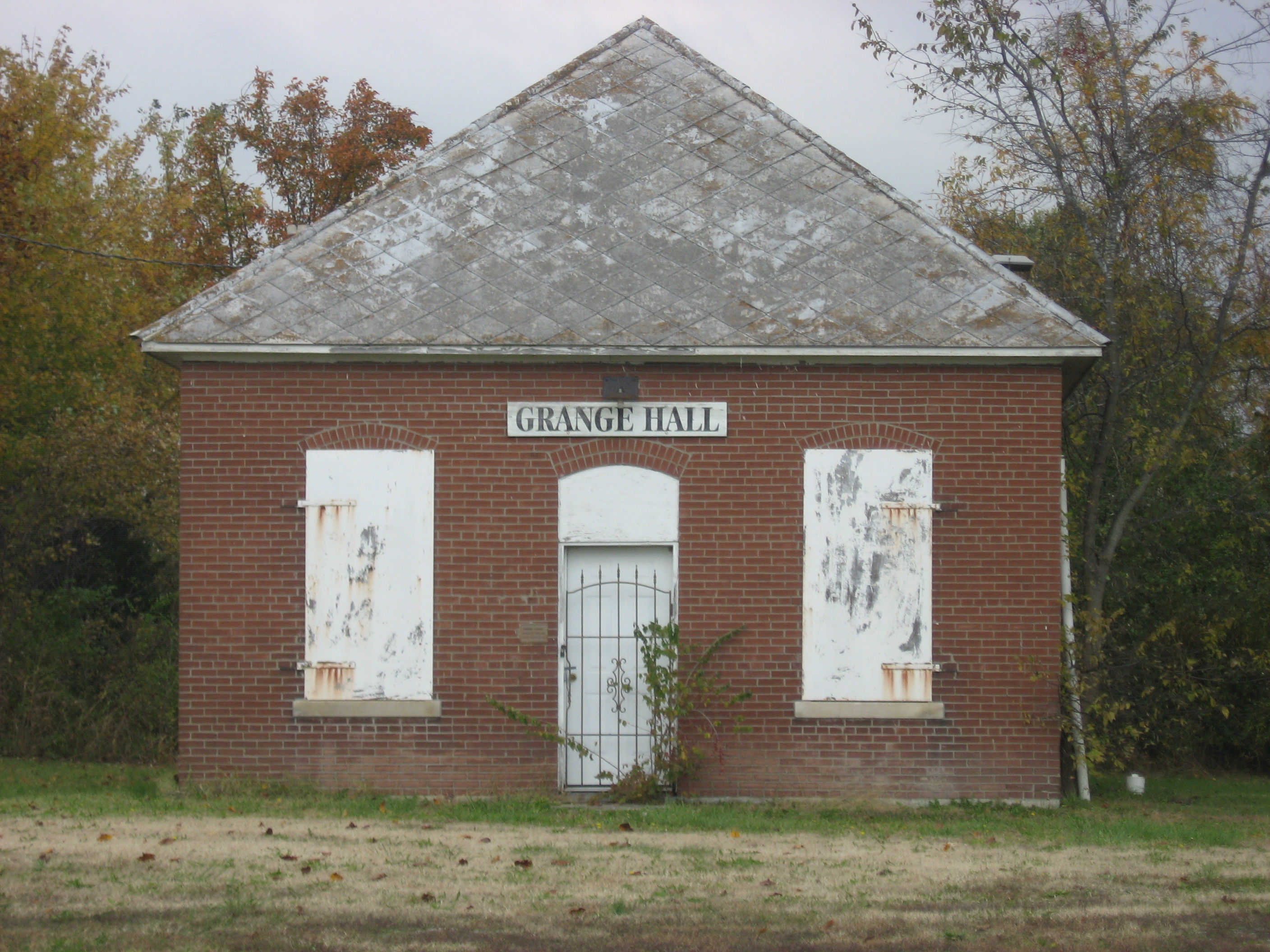
- The township's historic grange hall

- Location in Jackson County

- Jackson County's location in Illinois
- Coordinates: 37°48′35″N 89°19′23″W
- Country: United States
- State: Illinois
- County: Jackson
- Established: November 4, 1884

Area
  - Total: 37.63 sq mi (97.5 km^{2})
  - Land: 37.14 sq mi (96.2 km^{2})
  - Water: 0.49 sq mi (1.3 km^{2}) 1.30%
- Elevation: 407 ft (124 m)

Population (2020)
  - Total: 3,934
  - Density: 105.9/sq mi (40.90/km^{2})
- Time zone: UTC-6 (CST)
  - Summer (DST): UTC-5 (CDT)
- ZIP codes: 62924, 62932, 62966, 62994
- FIPS code: 17-077-70408

Somerset Township is one of sixteen townships in Jackson County, Illinois, USA. As of the 2020 census, its population was 3,934 and it contained 1,861 housing units.

== Geography ==
According to the 2021 census gazetteer files, Somerset Township has a total area of 37.63 square miles (97.46 km^{2}), of which 37.14 square miles (96.19 km^{2}) (or 98.70%) is land and 0.49 square miles (1.27 km^{2}) (or 1.30%) is water.

=== Cities, towns, villages ===
- Murphysboro (north quarter)

=== Unincorporated towns ===
- Harrison at 37.796718°N 89.337033°W

(This list is based on USGS data and may include former settlements.)

=== Adjacent townships ===
- Vergennes Township (north)
- Elk Township (northeast)
- DeSoto Township (east)
- Carbondale Township (southeast)
- Murphysboro Township (south)
- Sand Ridge Township (southwest)
- Levan Township (west)
- Ora Township (northwest)

=== Cemeteries ===
The township contains these four cemeteries: Boucher, Lutheran, Ripley and Zion.

=== Major highways ===
- Illinois Route 13
- Illinois Route 149

=== Landmarks ===
- Lake Murphysboro State Park (east quarter)

== Demographics ==
As of the 2020 census there were 3,934 people, 1,719 households, and 1,061 families residing in the township. The population density was 104.56 inhabitants per square mile (40.37/km^{2}). There were 1,861 housing units at an average density of 49.46 per square mile (19.10/km^{2}). The racial makeup of the township was 86.65% White, 6.69% African American, 0.36% Native American, 0.28% Asian, 0.05% Pacific Islander, 1.75% from other races, and 4.22% from two or more races. Hispanic or Latino of any race were 2.90% of the population.

There were 1,719 households, out of which 30.40% had children under the age of 18 living with them, 40.26% were married couples living together, 17.63% had a female householder with no spouse present, and 38.28% were non-families. 32.20% of all households were made up of individuals, and 22.30% had someone living alone who was 65 years of age or older. The average household size was 2.33 and the average family size was 2.94.

The township's age distribution consisted of 23.7% under the age of 18, 5.7% from 18 to 24, 24.3% from 25 to 44, 24.6% from 45 to 64, and 21.8% who were 65 years of age or older. The median age was 39.7 years. For every 100 females, there were 74.5 males. For every 100 females age 18 and over, there were 77.2 males.

The median income for a household in the township was $56,725, and the median income for a family was $76,991. Males had a median income of $41,029 versus $32,750 for females. The per capita income for the township was $36,768. About 6.6% of families and 8.8% of the population were below the poverty line, including 9.9% of those under age 18 and 7.3% of those age 65 or over.

Historical population
Census	Pop.	Note	%±
2000	4,152		—
2010	4,205		1.3%
2020	3,934		−6.4%
U.S. Decennial Census

== School districts ==
- Elverado Community Unit School District 196
- Murphysboro Community Unit School District 186

== Political districts ==
- Illinois' 12th congressional district
- State House District 115
- State Senate District 58
