= Murphysboro Township, Jackson County, Illinois =

Murphysboro Township
- Township
- Location in Jackson County

- Jackson County's location in Illinois
- Coordinates: 37°44′14″N 89°19′34″W
- Country: United States
- State: Illinois
- County: Jackson
- Established: November 4, 1884

Area
  - Total: 37.04 sq mi (95.9 km^{2})
  - Land: 36.28 sq mi (94.0 km^{2})
  - Water: 0.76 sq mi (2.0 km^{2}) 2.05%
- Elevation: 509 ft (155 m)

Population (2020)
  - Total: 9,434
  - Density: 260.0/sq mi (100.4/km^{2})
- Time zone: UTC-6 (CST)
  - Summer (DST): UTC-5 (CDT)
- ZIP codes: 62901, 62966
- FIPS code: 17-077-51466

Murphysboro Township is one of sixteen townships in Jackson County, Illinois, USA. As of the 2020 census, its population was 9,434 and it contained 4,948 housing units.

== Geography ==
According to the 2021 census gazetteer files, Murphysboro Township has a total area of 37.04 square miles (95.93 km^{2}), of which 36.28 square miles (93.96 km^{2}) (or 97.95%) is land and 0.76 square miles (1.97 km^{2}) (or 2.05%) is water.

=== Cities, towns, villages ===
- Carbondale (west edge)
- Murphysboro (south three-quarters)

=== Unincorporated towns ===
- Mount Carbon at 37.751995°N 89.321199°W
- Poplar Ridge at 37.700328°N 89.370646°W
- Texas Junction at 37.759773°N 89.323422°W

(This list is based on USGS data and may include former settlements.)

=== Adjacent townships ===
- Somerset Township (north)
- DeSoto Township (northeast)
- Carbondale Township (east)
- Makanda Township (southeast)
- Pomona Township (south)
- Sand Ridge Township (west)
- Levan Township (northwest)

=== Cemeteries ===
The township contains these twelve cemeteries: Bostick, Hall, Hiller-Crab Orchard, Mount Carbon, Mount Pleasant, Murdale Gardens of Memory, Murphysboro City, Pleasant Grove Memorial, Poplar Ridge, Saint Andrews, Tower Grove and Worthen.

=== Major highways ===
- Illinois Route 13
- Illinois Route 127
- Illinois Route 149

=== Airports and landing strips ===
- Saint Joseph Memorial Hospital Heliport

=== Lakes ===
- Browns Lake
- Carbon Lake
- Country Club Lake

=== Landmarks ===
- Lake Murphysboro State Park (southeast edge)
- Riverside Park

== Demographics ==
As of the 2020 census there were 9,434 people, 4,046 households, and 2,571 families residing in the township. The population density was 254.73 inhabitants per square mile (98.35/km^{2}). There were 4,948 housing units at an average density of 133.60 per square mile (51.58/km^{2}). The racial makeup of the township was 77.32% White, 12.58% African American, 0.15% Native American, 0.99% Asian, 0.04% Pacific Islander, 2.79% from other races, and 6.14% from two or more races. Hispanic or Latino of any race were 4.36% of the population.

There were 4,046 households, out of which 30.50% had children under the age of 18 living with them, 43.20% were married couples living together, 16.46% had a female householder with no spouse present, and 36.46% were non-families. 32.60% of all households were made up of individuals, and 15.00% had someone living alone who was 65 years of age or older. The average household size was 2.40 and the average family size was 3.06.

The township's age distribution consisted of 26.4% under the age of 18, 5.0% from 18 to 24, 27.8% from 25 to 44, 22.5% from 45 to 64, and 18.2% who were 65 years of age or older. The median age was 38.8 years. For every 100 females, there were 92.8 males. For every 100 females age 18 and over, there were 91.8 males.

The median income for a household in the township was $42,068, and the median income for a family was $49,693. Males had a median income of $31,875 versus $26,761 for females. The per capita income for the township was $23,397. About 15.8% of families and 18.1% of the population were below the poverty line, including 28.5% of those under age 18 and 12.2% of those age 65 or over.

Historical population
Census	Pop.	Note	%±
2000	15,478		—
2010	10,563		−31.8%
2020	9,434		−10.7%
U.S. Decennial Census

== School districts ==
- Murphysboro Community Unit School District 186

== Political districts ==
- Illinois' 12th congressional district
- State House District 115
- State Senate District 58
