= Levan Township, Jackson County, Illinois =

Levan Township
- Township
- Location in Jackson County

- Jackson County's location in Illinois
- Coordinates: 37°49′03″N 89°25′51″W
- Country: United States
- State: Illinois
- County: Jackson
- Established: November 4, 1884

Area
  - Total: 36.77 sq mi (95.2 km^{2})
  - Land: 33.36 sq mi (86.4 km^{2})
  - Water: 3.41 sq mi (8.8 km^{2}) 9.28%
- Elevation: 600 ft (183 m)

Population (2020)
  - Total: 816
  - Density: 24.5/sq mi (9.44/km^{2})
- Time zone: UTC-6 (CST)
  - Summer (DST): UTC-5 (CDT)
- ZIP codes: 62907, 62966
- FIPS code: 17-077-42990

Levan Township is one of sixteen townships in Jackson County, Illinois, USA. As of the 2020 census, its population was 816 and it contained 394 housing units.

== Geography ==
According to the 2021 census gazetteer files, Levan Township has a total area of 36.77 square miles (95.23 km^{2}), of which 33.36 square miles (86.40 km^{2}) (or 90.72%) is land and 3.41 square miles (8.83 km^{2}) (or 9.28%) is water.

=== Adjacent townships ===
- Ora Township (north)
- Vergennes Township (northeast)
- Somerset Township (east)
- Murphysboro Township (southeast)
- Sand Ridge Township (south)
- Fountain Bluff Township (southwest)
- Kinkaid Township (west)
- Bradley Township (northwest)

=== Cemeteries ===
The township contains these two cemeteries: Bartlett and Lone Oak.

=== Major highways ===
- Illinois Route 149

=== Landmarks ===
- Lake Murphysboro State Park (northwest half)

== Demographics ==
As of the 2020 census there were 816 people, 427 households, and 324 families residing in the township. The population density was 22.19 inhabitants per square mile (8.57/km^{2}). There were 394 housing units at an average density of 10.72 per square mile (4.14/km^{2}). The racial makeup of the township was 94.24% White, 0.37% African American, 0.25% Native American, 0.49% Asian, 0.00% Pacific Islander, 0.86% from other races, and 3.80% from two or more races. Hispanic or Latino of any race were 2.57% of the population.

There were 427 households, out of which 27.40% had children under the age of 18 living with them, 70.02% were married couples living together, 5.85% had a female householder with no spouse present, and 24.12% were non-families. 22.50% of all households were made up of individuals, and 20.80% had someone living alone who was 65 years of age or older. The average household size was 2.60 and the average family size was 2.99.

The township's age distribution consisted of 17.4% under the age of 18, 7.1% from 18 to 24, 18.9% from 25 to 44, 29.8% from 45 to 64, and 26.8% who were 65 years of age or older. The median age was 48.1 years. For every 100 females, there were 90.2 males. For every 100 females age 18 and over, there were 81.8 males.

The median income for a household in the township was $70,139, and the median income for a family was $104,766. Males had a median income of $58,125 versus $43,702 for females. The per capita income for the township was $53,978. About 10.8% of families and 10.3% of the population were below the poverty line, including 18.2% of those under age 18 and 6.4% of those age 65 or over.

Historical population
Census	Pop.	Note	%±
2000	768		—
2010	850		10.7%
2020	816		−4.0%
U.S. Decennial Census

== School districts ==
- Elverado Community Unit School District 196
- Murphysboro Community Unit School District 186
- Trico Community Unit School District 176

== Political districts ==
- Illinois' 12th congressional district
- State House District 115
- State Senate District 58
