= Kinkaid Township, Jackson County, Illinois =

Kinkaid Township
- Township
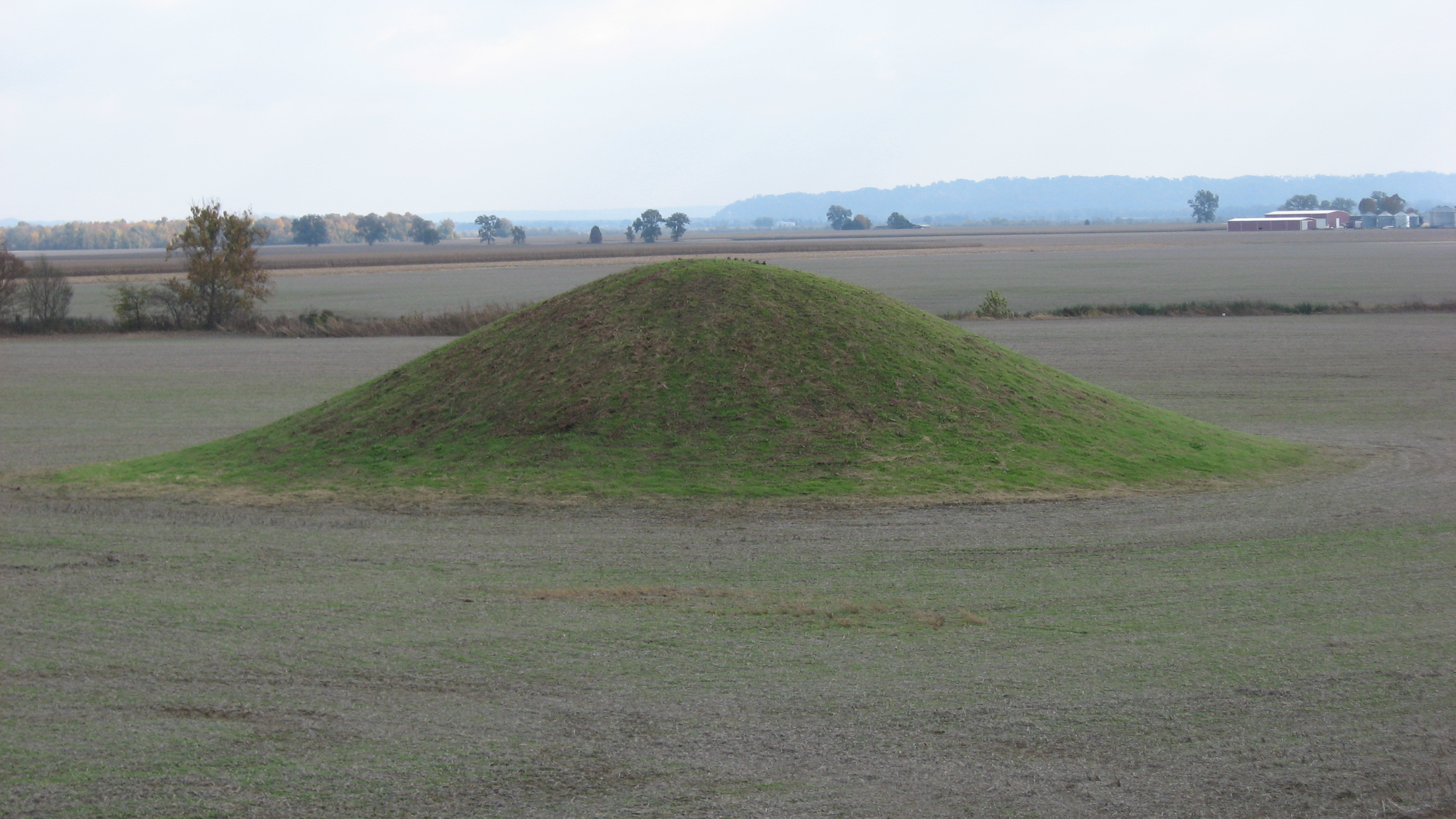
- The Cleiman Mound, a Middle Woodland period Indian mound along Illinois Route 3

- Location in Jackson County

- Jackson County's location in Illinois
- Coordinates: 37°49′26″N 89°32′49″W
- Country: United States
- State: Illinois
- County: Jackson
- Established: November 4, 1884

Area
  - Total: 36.33 sq mi (94.1 km^{2})
  - Land: 35.58 sq mi (92.2 km^{2})
  - Water: 0.75 sq mi (1.9 km^{2}) 2.07%
- Elevation: 594 ft (181 m)

Population (2010)
  - Total: 447
  - Density: 12.6/sq mi (4.85/km^{2})
- Time zone: UTC-6 (CST)
  - Summer (DST): UTC-5 (CDT)
- ZIP codes: 62280, 62907, 62950
- FIPS code: 17-077-40104

Kinkaid Township is one of sixteen townships in Jackson County, Illinois, USA. As of the 2020 census, its population was 447 and it contained 225 housing units.

== Geography ==
According to the 2021 census gazetteer files, Kinkaid Township has a total area of 36.33 square miles (94.09 km^{2}), of which 35.58 square miles (92.15 km^{2}) (or 97.93%) is land and 0.75 square miles (1.94 km^{2}) (or 2.07%) is water.

=== Unincorporated towns ===
- Crain at 37.780051°N 89.507874°W
- Dry Hill at 37.817274°N 89.553431°W
- Glenn at 37.803663°N 89.580655°W

(This list is based on USGS data and may include former settlements.)

=== Adjacent townships ===
- Bradley Township (north)
- Ora Township (northeast)
- Levan Township (east)
- Sand Ridge Township (southeast)
- Fountain Bluff Township (south)
- Degognia Township (west)

=== Cemeteries ===
The township contains these Eight cemeteries: Bower, Glenn, Jones, Lee, McBride, McCormick, Talbott and Wilson.

=== Major highways ===
- Illinois Route 3

== Demographics ==
As of the 2020 census there were 447 people, 196 households, and 122 families residing in the township. The population density was 12.30 inhabitants per square mile (4.75/km^{2}). There were 225 housing units at an average density of 6.19 per square mile (2.39/km^{2}). The racial makeup of the township was 95.30% White, 0.00% African American, 0.22% Native American, 0.22% Asian, 0.00% Pacific Islander, 0.22% from other races, and 4.03% from two or more races. Hispanic or Latino of any race were 1.12% of the population.

There were 196 households, out of which 35.70% had children under the age of 18 living with them, 38.27% were married couples living together, 23.98% had a female householder with no spouse present, and 37.76% were non-families. 32.70% of all households were made up of individuals, and 19.40% had someone living alone who was 65 years of age or older. The average household size was 2.29 and the average family size was 2.98.

The township's age distribution consisted of 19.9% under the age of 18, 11.2% from 18 to 24, 12.5% from 25 to 44, 39.8% from 45 to 64, and 16.7% who were 65 years of age or older. The median age was 51.9 years. For every 100 females, there were 84.4 males. For every 100 females age 18 and over, there were 54.7 males.

The median income for a household in the township was $42,857, and the median income for a family was $59,375. Males had a median income of $50,476 versus $22,083 for females. The per capita income for the township was $22,980. About 33.6% of families and 31.5% of the population were below the poverty line, including 44.9% of those under age 18 and 34.7% of those age 65 or over.

Historical population
Census	Pop.	Note	%±
2000	516		—
2010	486		−5.8%
2020	447		−8.0%
U.S. Decennial Census

== School districts ==
- Trico Community Unit School District 176

== Political districts ==
- Illinois' 12th congressional district
- State House District 115
- State Senate District 58
