= Degognia Township, Jackson County, Illinois =

Degognia Township
- Township
- Location in Jackson County

- Jackson County's location in Illinois
- Coordinates: 37°49′N 89°38′W
- Country: United States
- State: Illinois
- County: Jackson
- Established: November 4, 1884

Area
  - Total: 30.64 sq mi (79.4 km^{2})
  - Land: 29.53 sq mi (76.5 km^{2})
  - Water: 1.11 sq mi (2.9 km^{2}) 3.63%
- Elevation: 360 ft (110 m)

Population (2020)
  - Total: 154
  - Density: 5.22/sq mi (2.01/km^{2})
- Time zone: UTC-6 (CST)
  - Summer (DST): UTC-5 (CDT)
- ZIP codes: 62280, 62907, 62950
- FIPS code: 17-077-19148

Degognia Township is one of 16 townships in Jackson County, Illinois, United States. As of the 2020 census, its population was 154 and it contained 62 housing units. The township derives its name from Degognia Creek.

== Geography ==
According to the 2021 census gazetteer files, Degognia Township has a total area of 30.64 square miles (79.36 km^{2}), of which 29.53 square miles (76.48 km^{2}) (or 96.37%) is land and 1.11 square miles (2.87 km^{2}) (or 3.63%) is water.

=== Unincorporated towns ===
- Cora at 37.823941°N 89.67038°W
- Degognia at 37.861163°N 89.630378°W
- Jones Ridge at 37.800329°N 89.625379°W

(This list is based on USGS data and may include former settlements.)

=== Adjacent townships ===
- Bradley Township (northeast)
- Kinkaid Township (east)
- Fountain Bluff Township (southeast)

=== Cemeteries ===
The township contains these three cemeteries: Buchanan, Houge and Isom.

=== Major highways ===
- Illinois Route 3

=== Airports and landing strips ===
- Reeds Creek Landing Airport

=== Rivers ===
- Mississippi River

== Demographics ==
As of the 2020 census there were 154 people, 55 households, and 55 families residing in the township. The population density was 5.03 inhabitants per square mile (1.94/km^{2}). There were 62 housing units at an average density of 2.02 per square mile (0.78/km^{2}). The racial makeup of the township was 94.81% White, 0.00% African American, 0.00% Native American, 0.00% Asian, 0.00% Pacific Islander, 0.00% from other races, and 5.19% from two or more races. Hispanic or Latino of any race were 1.95% of the population.

There were 55 households, out of which 52.70% had children under the age of 18 living with them, 100.00% were married couples living together, 0.00% had a female householder with no spouse present, and 0.00% were non-families. 0.00% of all households were made up of individuals, and 0.00% had someone living alone who was 65 years of age or older. The average household size was 2.27 and the average family size was 2.27.

The township's age distribution consisted of 17.6% under the age of 18, 3.2% from 18 to 24, 31.2% from 25 to 44, 20.8% from 45 to 64, and 27.2% who were 65 years of age or older. The median age was 29.9 years. For every 100 females, there were 68.9 males. For every 100 females age 18 and over, there were 98.1 males.

The median income for a household in the township was $138,750, and the median income for a family was $138,750.

Historical population
Census	Pop.	Note	%±
2000	200		—
2010	153		−23.5%
2020	154		0.7%
U.S. Decennial Census

== School districts ==
- Trico Community Unit School District 176

== Political districts ==
- Illinois' 12th congressional district
- State House District 115
- State Senate District 58
