= DeSoto Township, Jackson County, Illinois =

De Soto Township
- Township
- Location in Jackson County

- Jackson County's location in Illinois
- Coordinates: 37°49′07″N 89°12′50″W
- Country: United States
- State: Illinois
- County: Jackson
- Established: November 4, 1884

Area
  - Total: 37.94 sq mi (98.3 km^{2})
  - Land: 36.48 sq mi (94.5 km^{2})
  - Water: 1.46 sq mi (3.8 km^{2}) 3.84%
- Elevation: 390 ft (119 m)

Population (2020)
  - Total: 2,319
  - Density: 63.57/sq mi (24.54/km^{2})
- Time zone: UTC-6 (CST)
  - Summer (DST): UTC-5 (CDT)
- ZIP codes: 62901, 62924, 62932, 62966
- FIPS code: 17-077-19629

De Soto Township is one of sixteen townships in Jackson County, Illinois, USA. As of the 2020 census, its population was 2,319 and it contained 1,137 housing units.

== History ==
De Soto Township is named for Hernando de Soto, the discoverer of the Mississippi River.

== Geography ==
According to the 2021 census gazetteer files, De Soto Township has a total area of 37.94 square miles (98.26 km^{2}), of which 36.48 square miles (94.48 km^{2}) (or 96.16%) is land and 1.46 square miles (3.78 km^{2}) (or 3.84%) is water.

=== Cities, towns, villages ===
- De Soto

=== Unincorporated towns ===
- Reeds Station at 37.777828°N 89.160914°W
- Ward at 37.850051°N 89.235361°W

(This list is based on USGS data and may include former settlements.)

=== Adjacent townships ===
- Elk Township (north)
- Six Mile Township, Franklin County (northeast)
- Carbondale Township (south)
- Murphysboro Township (southwest)
- Somerset Township (west)
- Vergennes Township (northwest)

=== Cemeteries ===
The township contains these seven cemeteries: Beasley, Bouscher, Campbell, Central-Crews, De Soto, Howard and Indian Hill.

=== Major highways ===
- U.S. Route 51
- Illinois Route 149

=== Airports and landing strips ===
- Southern Illinois Airport

== Demographics ==
As of the 2020 census there were 2,319 people, 1,001 households, and 697 families residing in the township. The population density was 61.13 inhabitants per square mile (23.60/km^{2}). There were 1,137 housing units at an average density of 29.97 per square mile (11.57/km^{2}). The racial makeup of the township was 87.49% White, 3.79% African American, 0.47% Native American, 0.22% Asian, 0.04% Pacific Islander, 0.73% from other races, and 7.24% from two or more races. Hispanic or Latino of any race were 3.23% of the population.

There were 1,001 households, out of which 30.50% had children under the age of 18 living with them, 45.45% were married couples living together, 16.38% had a female householder with no spouse present, and 30.37% were non-families. 24.10% of all households were made up of individuals, and 8.50% had someone living alone who was 65 years of age or older. The average household size was 2.47 and the average family size was 2.88.

The township's age distribution consisted of 24.7% under the age of 18, 6.3% from 18 to 24, 23.1% from 25 to 44, 29.5% from 45 to 64, and 16.4% who were 65 years of age or older. The median age was 42.1 years. For every 100 females, there were 95.8 males. For every 100 females age 18 and over, there were 104.9 males.

The median income for a household in the township was $50,670, and the median income for a family was $57,792. Males had a median income of $35,974 versus $28,780 for females. The per capita income for the township was $25,031. About 8.0% of families and 14.3% of the population were below the poverty line, including 5.3% of those under age 18 and 16.9% of those age 65 or over.

Historical population
| Census | Pop. | Note | %± |
|---|---|---|---|
| 2000 | 2,234 | | — |
| 2010 | 2,388 | | 6.9% |
| 2020 | 2,319 | | −2.9% |
U.S. Decennial Census

== School districts ==
- Elverado Community Unit School District 196
- Herrin Community Unit School District 4

== Transportation ==
Southern Illinois Airport is in the township.

== Political districts ==
- Illinois's 12th congressional district
- State House District 115
- State Senate District 58
