= Brownsville, Jackson County, Illinois =

Ghost town in Jackson County, Illinois, United States

Coordinates: 37.771406°N 89.384052°W

Brownsville is a ghost town in Jackson County, Illinois, United States.

Brownsville, located close to a salt creek that empties into the Big Muddy River, is the former county seat of Jackson County. It is 3.25 miles (5.23 km) due west of Murphysboro and 0.75 miles (1.21 km) south of Illinois Route 149. It was moved when the courthouse and downtown burned to the ground in 1843, and the county seat was then moved to Murphysboro.
