= Carbondale Township =

Carbondale Township may refer to the following townships in the United States:

- Carbondale Township, Jackson County, Illinois
- Carbondale Township, Lackawanna County, Pennsylvania
