= Ora Township, Jackson County, Illinois =

Ora Township
- Township
- Location in Jackson County

- Jackson County's location in Illinois
- Coordinates: 37°54′40″N 89°25′31″W
- Country: United States
- State: Illinois
- County: Jackson
- Established: November 4, 1884

Area
  - Total: 36.69 sq mi (95.0 km^{2})
  - Land: 36.59 sq mi (94.8 km^{2})
  - Water: 0.10 sq mi (0.26 km^{2}) 0.26%
- Elevation: 453 ft (138 m)

Population (2020)
  - Total: 492
  - Density: 13.4/sq mi (5.19/km^{2})
- Time zone: UTC-6 (CST)
  - Summer (DST): UTC-5 (CDT)
- ZIP codes: 62274, 62907, 62966, 62994
- FIPS code: 17-077-56276

Ora Township is one of sixteen townships in Jackson County, Illinois, USA. As of the 2020 census, its population was 492 and it contained 218 housing units.

== Geography ==
According to the 2021 census gazetteer files, Ora Township has a total area of 36.69 square miles (95.03 km^{2}), of which 36.59 square miles (94.77 km^{2}) (or 99.74%) is land and 0.10 square miles (0.26 km^{2}) (or 0.26%) is water.

=== Unincorporated towns ===
- Oraville at 37.865051°N 89.383423°W
- Sato at 37.90894°N 89.430647°W

(This list is based on USGS data and may include former settlements.)

=== Adjacent townships ===
- Vergennes Township (east)
- Somerset Township (southeast)
- Levan Township (south)
- Kinkaid Township (southwest)
- Bradley Township (west)

=== Cemeteries ===
The township contains these eight cemeteries: Birkner, Creek Paum, Ditzler, Graff, Joubert, King, Underwood and Williamson.

=== Major highways ===
- Illinois Route 4

== Demographics ==
As of the 2020 census there were 492 people, 201 households, and 176 families residing in the township. The population density was 13.41 inhabitants per square mile (5.18/km^{2}). There were 218 housing units at an average density of 5.94 per square mile (2.29/km^{2}). The racial makeup of the township was 94.92% White, 0.20% African American, 0.41% Native American, 0.00% Asian, 0.00% Pacific Islander, 0.20% from other races, and 4.27% from two or more races. Hispanic or Latino of any race were 1.42% of the population.

There were 201 households, out of which 70.60% had children under the age of 18 living with them, 59.70% were married couples living together, 17.41% had a female householder with no spouse present, and 12.44% were non-families. 5.00% of all households were made up of individuals, and 5.00% had someone living alone who was 65 years of age or older. The average household size was 4.12 and the average family size was 4.32.

The township's age distribution consisted of 45.7% under the age of 18, 4.3% from 18 to 24, 24.6% from 25 to 44, 14.7% from 45 to 64, and 10.7% who were 65 years of age or older. The median age was 24.0 years. For every 100 females, there were 66.3 males. For every 100 females age 18 and over, there were 56.3 males.

The median income for a household in the township was $60,417, and the median income for a family was $60,119. Males had a median income of $59,821 versus $20,929 for females. The per capita income for the township was $21,026. About 4.0% of families and 3.2% of the population were below the poverty line, including 3.5% of those under age 18 and 0.0% of those age 65 or over.

Historical population
Census	Pop.	Note	%±
2000	453		—
2010	514		13.5%
2020	492		−4.3%
U.S. Decennial Census

== School districts ==
- Elverado Community Unit School District 196
- Trico Community Unit School District 176

== Political districts ==
- Illinois' 12th congressional district
- State House District 115
- State Senate District 58

== Notable person ==
- Wayne Alstat (1934–2019), farmer and Illinois state representative, was born in Ora Township.
