= Grange Hall (Murphysboro, Illinois) =

- U.S. National Register of Historic Places
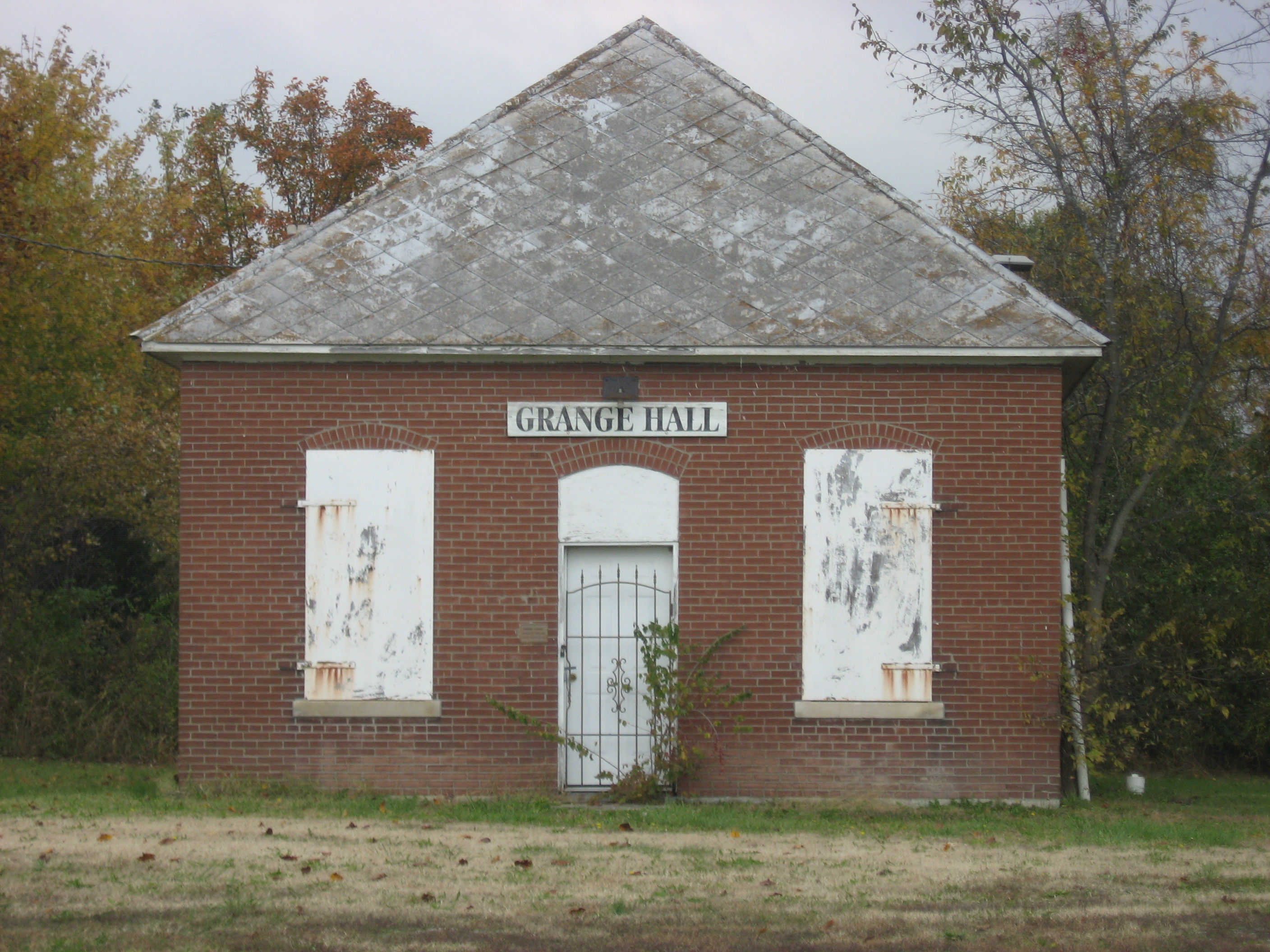
- Front of the hall

- Location within Illinois Location within the United States
- Nearest city: Murphysboro, Illinois
- Coordinates: 37°49′10.5″N 89°19′19″W
- Area: 1 acre (0.40 ha)
- Built: 1912
- Architect: W. A. Pitman
- Architectural style: Commercial
- NRHP reference No.: 90000722
- Added to NRHP: May 4, 1990

The Grange Hall in Somerset Township, Jackson County, Illinois, is the historic meeting place of Somerset Township's chapter of The Grange. Built in 1912, the building was Somerset Grange #1553's second meeting hall; the first building was built in 1876 and burned down in 1909. The red brick building was built by contractor W. A. Pitman in the Commercial style. The Grange Hall served as a meeting place for local farmers to discuss agricultural affairs and propose farm policy to legislators. The National Farmers Union's newspaper, the Union Farmer, was published from the Somerset Grange Hall until 1914. The building also served as a local social center and hosted township elections, club meetings, and community events. The hall was rehabilitated in 1988; it still serves as a township polling place.

The hall was listed on the National Register of Historic Places in 1990.
