= Sand Ridge Township, Jackson County, Illinois =

Sand Ridge Township
- Township
- Location in Jackson County

- Jackson County's location in Illinois
- Coordinates: 37°44′21″N 89°26′18″W
- Country: United States
- State: Illinois
- County: Jackson
- Established: November 4, 1884

Area
  - Total: 36.38 sq mi (94.2 km^{2})
  - Land: 35.45 sq mi (91.8 km^{2})
  - Water: 0.93 sq mi (2.4 km^{2}) 2.55%
- Elevation: 358 ft (109 m)

Population (2020)
  - Total: 722
  - Density: 20.4/sq mi (7.86/km^{2})
- Time zone: UTC-6 (CST)
  - Summer (DST): UTC-5 (CDT)
- ZIP codes: 62907, 62940, 62942, 62966
- FIPS code: 17-077-67522

Sand Ridge Township is one of sixteen townships in Jackson County, Illinois, United States. As of the 2020 census, its population was 722 and it contained 333 housing units.

== Geography ==
According to the 2021 census gazetteer files, Sand Ridge Township has a total area of 36.38 square miles (94.22 km^{2}), of which 35.45 square miles (91.82 km^{2}) (or 97.45%) is land and 0.93 square miles (2.41 km^{2}) (or 2.55%) is water.

=== Cities, towns, villages ===
- Gorham

=== Unincorporated towns ===
- Grimsby at 37.750329°N 89.449261°W
- Sand Ridge at 37.740051°N 89.442594°W

(This list is based on USGS data and may include former settlements.)

=== Adjacent townships ===
- Levan Township (north)
- Somerset Township (northeast)
- Murphysboro Township (east)
- Pomona Township (southeast)
- Grand Tower Township (south)
- Fountain Bluff Township (west)
- Kinkaid Township (northwest)

=== Major highways ===
- Illinois Route 3
- Illinois Route 149

=== Landmarks ===
- Lake Murphysboro State Park (southwest edge)

Kincaid Spillway

=== Notable persons ===
- Gary Geiger

== Demographics ==
As of the 2020 census there were 722 people, 359 households, and 258 families residing in the township. The population density was 19.85 inhabitants per square mile (7.66/km^{2}). There were 333 housing units at an average density of 9.15 per square mile (3.53/km^{2}). The racial makeup of the township was 89.06% White, 1.94% African American, 0.28% Native American, 0.42% Asian, 0.00% Pacific Islander, 3.05% from other races, and 5.26% from two or more races. Hispanic or Latino of any race were 5.40% of the population.

There were 359 households, out of which 37.00% had children under the age of 18 living with them, 49.58% were married couples living together, 13.09% had a female householder with no spouse present, and 28.13% were non-families. 27.30% of all households were made up of individuals, and 13.60% had someone living alone who was 65 years of age or older. The average household size was 2.68 and the average family size was 3.22.

The township's age distribution consisted of 21.5% under the age of 18, 24.1% from 18 to 24, 20.3% from 25 to 44, 17.2% from 45 to 64, and 16.8% who were 65 years of age or older. The median age was 26.5 years. For every 100 females, there were 102.3 males. For every 100 females age 18 and over, there were 78.3 males.

The median income for a household in the township was $46,125, and the median income for a family was $61,310. Males had a median income of $62,813 versus $17,083 for females. The per capita income for the township was $18,602. About 7.8% of families and 20.9% of the population were below the poverty line, including 30.0% of those under age 18 and 17.3% of those age 65 or over.

Historical population
Census	Pop.	Note	%±
2000	872		—
2010	816		−6.4%
2020	722		−11.5%
U.S. Decennial Census

== School districts ==
- Murphysboro Community Unit School District 166
- Trico Community Unit School District 176

== Political districts ==
- Illinois' 12th congressional district
- State House District 115
- State Senate District 58
