= Sato, Illinois =

- Unincorporated community
- Location within Illinois Location within the United States
- Coordinates: 37°54′32″N 89°25′50″W
- Country: United States
- State: Illinois
- County: Jackson
- Elevation: 466 ft (142 m)
- Time zone: UTC-6 (Central (CST))
  - Summer (DST): UTC-5 (CDT)
- Area code: 618
- GNIS feature ID: 423158

Sato is an unincorporated community in Ora Township, Jackson County, Illinois, United States. The community is located along County Route 8 3.8 miles (6.1 km) east-northeast of Ava.
