= Wayne Alstat =

American farmer and politician (1934–2019)

Wayne Gene Alstat (February 22, 1934 – November 16, 2019) was an American farmer and politician.

Alstat was born in Ora Township, Illinois. He graduated from Vergennes Community High School in Vergennes, Illinois. He served in the United States Army during the Korean War. Alsat was a farmer in Vergennes, Illinois and was involved with the farm equipment business-Vergennes Equipment. He served as the highway commissioner for Oral Township from 1959 to 1981. He served in the Illinois House of Representatives from 1981 to 1983 and was a Republican. Alstat was the second write-in candidate to be elected to the office in the history of Illinois. During the 2008 Republican Party presidential primaries, Alstat endorsed the presidential campaign of Rudy Giuliani. Alstat died at the Carbondale Memorial Hospital in Carbondale, Illinois.
