= Mount Carbon =

Mount Carbon may refer to:

== Places ==
=== United States ===
- Mount Carbon, Illinois
- Mount Carbon, Pennsylvania
- Mount Carbon, West Virginia
