= Cora, Illinois =

- Unincorporated community
- Location within Illinois Location within the United States
- Coordinates: 37°49′26″N 89°40′13″W
- Country: United States
- State: Illinois
- County: Jackson
- Elevation: 367 ft (112 m)
- Time zone: UTC-6 (Central (CST))
  - Summer (DST): UTC-5 (CDT)
- Area code: 618
- GNIS feature ID: 406578

Cora is an unincorporated community in Degognia Township, Jackson County, Illinois, United States. The community is located along Illinois Route 3 10.3 miles (16.6 km) east-southeast of Chester. Degognia Creek flows past the community and enters the Mississippi River approximately 1.5 miles to the south. Illinois Route 3 passes the north side of the site.
