= Gary Geiger =

American baseball player (1937–1996)

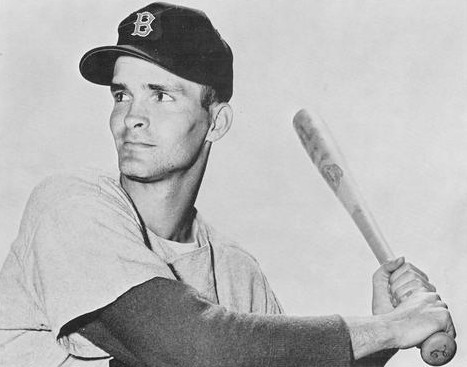
- Outfielder
- Born: April 4, 1937; Sand Ridge Township, Illinois, U.S.
- Died: April 24, 1996 (aged 59); Murphysboro, Illinois, U.S.
- Batted: Left Threw: Right

MLB debut
- April 15, 1958, for the Cleveland Indians

Last MLB appearance
- July 10, 1970, for the Houston Astros

MLB statistics
- Batting average: .246
- Home runs: 77
- Runs batted in: 283
- Stats at Baseball Reference

Teams
- Cleveland Indians (1958); Boston Red Sox (1959–1965); Atlanta Braves (1966–1967); Houston Astros (1969–1970)

Gary Merle Geiger (April 4, 1937 – April 24, 1996) was an American major league outfielder for the Cleveland Indians, Boston Red Sox, Atlanta Braves, and Houston Astros from (1958–1970). He was born in Sand Ridge, Illinois. His offseason home while a major leaguer was Murphysboro, Illinois. His wife Lyn's parents were St. Louis, Missouri residents.

== Career statistics ==
His career batting average was .246, with 77 home runs and 283 runs batted in. He was a weak hitter against left-handed pitching. He fielded .985, with 24 lifetime errors. He was a fast runner, once timed at 3.5 seconds from home plate to first on a bunt. Geiger ranked 8th in stolen bases in 1959 & 1961 with 9 & 16 steals respectively, but as high as 2nd in 1962 with 18 steals although he was caught 11 times. Geiger is one of three Red Sox to hit an inside-the-park grand slam home run at Fenway Park. His came in 1961. The others to accomplish the feat are Don Lenhardt (1952) and Mike Greenwell (September 1, 1990).

He was signed as an amateur free agent by the St. Louis Cardinals in 1954. Cleveland drafted him as a pitcher from the Cards' Rochester Red Wings top farm club on December 2, 1957, that that year's Rule 5 Draft. He was 6 ft 0 in (1.83 m), but weighed only 168 lb. He liked to keep his weight between 171 & 175 lb, but was often unable to and even dropped below 135 lb following an ulcer operation. He batted left and threw right, and in July 1958 was accidentally beaned by Camilo Pascual of the Washington Senators.

== Boston Red Sox (1959–1965) ==
On December 2, 1958, the Indians received Jimmy Piersall from the Red Sox for Geiger and veteran slugger Vic Wertz (no money was involved) after Geiger had hit .231 in 91 games as a 21-year-old Cleveland rookie.

In late March 1959, late in spring training, Geiger collided with teammate (shortstop) Don Buddin chasing a foul ball in left field, in Scottsdale, Arizona. He was knocked unconscious and severely bruised. But he recovered to play left field later that year.

On July 29, 1960, he was operated on for a collapsed lung at Sancta Maria Hospital in Cambridge, Massachusetts, and was advised to rest fully afterwards. Doctors said Geiger would miss the remainder of the season.

Geiger's Topps 1961 baseball card was featured in the 2000 film Skipped Parts as part of a baby's mobile at the end of the film.

In March 1961, during spring training, Geiger made a game-saving catch in Palm Springs, California for the Red Sox against the new expansion Los Angeles Angels, robbing Julio Bécquer of a sure double in deep right center field in an 8–7 Boston win. Earlier in the game, he had collected three hits and scored three runs.

Batting second and playing center field on April 17, 1961, early in the regular season, he hit a game-winning home run into the Fenway Park right field bullpen in the 7th inning of a 3-2 Boston win over the Angels. But then he dropped a fly ball hit by Brooks Robinson with two outs in the 9th inning of a 5–4 Red Sox loss to the Baltimore Orioles on May 27. It should have been an easy catch, but Geiger bobbled it when he and two other Red Sox players tried to glove it. The error was the first by Boston in ten games. He had accounted for a Red Sox run in the 5th by doubling and scoring on a single by Wertz.

He broke up what might have been a second consecutive shutout by 18-year-old $125,000 bonus baby Lew Krausse Jr. on June 23 with a game-winning three-run home run in the 7th inning after a walk to Pete Runnels and an error on Chuck Schilling's sacrifice bunt. Krausse had pitched a 4–0 shutout of the Angels in his major league debut for the Kansas City Athletics the week before.

Geiger and Jackie Jensen launched home runs in the late innings of a 9–4 Red Sox win over the new expansion Washington Senators on August 23. In the second game of a doubleheader Geiger pinch-hit for Carroll Hardy, connecting for a triple off Cal McLish which scored Pumpsie Green to earn Boston a split with the Chicago White Sox.

In November, it was reported that Geiger, Schilling and star pitcher Bill Monbouquette were likely to be lost to Boston for military service after Geiger had led the Red Sox with 18 home runs in 1961, but it didn't happen. (Catcher Jim Pagliaroni was 2nd with 16.)

On June 9, 1962, Geiger crashed directly into the center field wall at Fenway Park attempting to catch a Tito Francona drive as the Red Sox lost to his old team Cleveland in 13 innings. He ventured back on the dirt track and looked as if he were going to come up with the ball. He made a sudden leap for it but struck the wall, and the ball caromed back onto the field. He landed on his feet, clapped his head with his arm, sank slowly to his knees and fell flat on the ground. He was removed on a stretcher and taken to a hospital.

On May 27, 1963, a recovered Geiger and shortstop Eddie Bressoud hit 8th-inning home runs against the Detroit Tigers in a 6–5 Boston win at Tiger Stadium.

But on February 27, 1964, Geiger underwent surgery for a bleeding ulcer at St. Luke's Hospital in St. Louis after having been stricken en route to training camp. Doctors advised him to remain in the hospital for 7–10 days before returning for spring training in Arizona. He played 5 games for the Red Sox early in the season, but was placed on the voluntary retired list at his own request on May 13, and was expected to be sidelined for at least 40 days. He ended up taking the rest of 1964 off because of general fatigue, lack of stamina and an underweight and weakened constitution, but returned the next year.

On June 8, 1965, he sustained a triple fracture of the left hand diving for a Tom McCraw double in the 8th inning of a game won by the White Sox 7–3, after racing in from deep center field and diving for the shallow fly ball. That October, the Red Sox sold him along with seven other players to their Triple-A affiliate Toronto Maple Leafs in the International League. Left unprotected as a minor leaguer, Geiger was selected by the Atlanta Braves in the Rule 5 Draft of December 1965.

== Atlanta Braves (1966–1967), Houston Astros (1969–1970) ==
In May 1966, the newly relocated Atlanta Braves were reportedly desperate for pitchers. Geiger, Rico Carty and Gene Oliver were outfielders mentioned as possible "trade bait". But Geiger was still with the Braves on July 28, 1967, when they rose to 3rd place in the National League. Filling in for an injured Mack Jones, he was a whiz in center field with a fine catch in the 6th inning to help the Braves out of a bases-loaded jam and then, the next inning, caught a fly ball against the fence. However, Atlanta released Geiger at the end of the 1967 season.

Geiger spent all of 1968 in the minors, in the St. Louis Cardinals organization. Houston then obtained him in the Rule 5 Draft for the 1969 season -- the third time had Geiger become a Rule 5 draftee. He batted 8th for the Houston Astros in 1969, and played left and right field. On June 23, he drove in three runs as a pinch-hitter to help the Astros to a 7th consecutive win on June 23.

Geiger spent most of 1970 in the minors again. On June 26, 1970, the Astros repurchased him from the Triple-A Oklahoma City 89ers (Oklahoma Redhawks) of the American Association (1902–1997), but Geiger only played 5 games for the 1970 Astros. His playing career ended that year.

== Manager ==
On December 7, 1971, the Cardinals chose Geiger to manage their Cedar Rapids Cardinals farm team in the Midwest League.

== Personal life ==
Geiger wore false teeth after his own, too soft to take fillings, had all been extracted by age 22.

He overcame his pronounced fear of flying, making every trip with the teams he played with, albeit reluctantly.
