= Bradley Township, Jackson County, Illinois =

Bradley Township
- Township
- Location in Jackson County

- Jackson County's location in Illinois
- Coordinates: 37°54′39″N 89°32′39″W
- Country: United States
- State: Illinois
- County: Jackson
- Established: November 4, 1884

Area
  - Total: 44.93 sq mi (116.4 km^{2})
  - Land: 44.87 sq mi (116.2 km^{2})
  - Water: 0.06 sq mi (0.16 km^{2}) 0.14%
- Elevation: 614 ft (187 m)

Population (2020)
  - Total: 1,908
  - Density: 42.52/sq mi (16.42/km^{2})
- Time zone: UTC-6 (CST)
  - Summer (DST): UTC-5 (CDT)
- ZIP codes: 62280, 62907, 62916
- FIPS code: 17-077-07731

Bradley Township is one of sixteen townships in Jackson County, Illinois, USA. At the 2020 census, its population was 1,908 and it contained 806 housing units.

== History ==
Bradley Township lies in the extreme north-western part of Jackson County and was named in honor of Judge William Bradley who had migrated to the county with his father Joshua Bradley from Tennessee. The township contained a few settlers before the organization of the State in 1818. It contains two towns, Campbell Hill on the railroad named above, 4 miles (6.4 km) from its rival, Ava.

This village of Bradley was surveyed and laid out by Edward Newsome, county surveyor, and certified on January 10, 1874. The plat was filed for record with R.W. Hamilton, Circuit Clerk and Recorder, two months later on 19 March. A somewhat prospective but nonetheless partly critical historic description reads "St. Louis & C. R. R. has a station here, and Bradley is deserted, and its glory has paled in the presence of the more youthful competitor."" The source goes on to say that the township had one school building built in 1877, at the considerable cost to the taxpayers of about $1,200, with architectural expertise as well as taste and culture.

In its early days it boasted one hotel kept by Mr. Benson, and its reputation may be inferred from the fact that it was to his hotel the passengers northward or southward on the railroad turned for their dinners. One church was built in the town, erected by the Baptist society, known as "Looney Spring" Church. Judge Bradley and his brother Richard Bradley had both been pastors of this church along with George Gordon. This is the strongest religious organization in that part of the county. Among the members of this church, in its early years, mention is made of David Underwood, his sons and families, the Gordons, the Phoenix, and Downen families. A prosperous Sunday School was connected with the church.

Gordon & Co. were dealers in general merchandise. Augustus Dudenbastle was postmaster and dealer in dry goods and groceries. John Hanna had a drug store, the custom and merchant mill, which was formerly run by Thomas Woods and William Mohlenbrock, "a large and well-conducted establishment, and afford[ed] the farmers a home market for their grain".

Early settlers of Bradley Township (historically referred to as Bradley precinct) included Cyrus Bradley, Jonathan McDonald, William Downen, Peter Stuffle, and individuals named Phoenix, Tucker, Ward, and Underwood. Mrs. William Kimmel and a Mr. Barrow settled in the area in 1817, followed by Josiah Cully in 1836.

The township is largely agricultural. The eastern section features broken yet productive terrain, while the southern and western portions are generally flat. Over time, early log schoolhouses were largely replaced by newer frame buildings.

The historic account continues "this was all heavily timbered before 'his echoing axe, the settler swung', and there is yet an abundance of the very best timber. Good qualities of building stone abound."

== Geography ==
According to the 2021 census gazetteer files, Bradley Township has a total area of 44.93 square miles (116.37 km^{2}), of which 44.87 square miles (116.21 km^{2}) (or 99.86%) is land and 0.06 square miles (0.16 km^{2}) (or 0.14%) is water.

=== Geographical features ===
==== Natural ====
Degognia Creek is the western line of demarcation. Kinkaid and Beaucoup Creeks have their source within its limits, the former flowing southward and the latter in a northeasterly direction. It is further drained and watered by Degognia Creek and some of its eastern tributaries.

==== Manmade ====
The St. Louis and Cairo Railroad enters it from the north and runs a south-easterly course, leaving in the east, a little more than one mile (1.6 km) from the south line.

=== Cities, towns, villages ===
- Ava
- Campbell Hill

=== Unincorporated towns ===
- West Point at 37.8989402°N 89.6220438°W

(This list is based on USGS data and may include former settlements.)

=== Extinct towns ===
- Bradley at 37.9411624°N 89.5670412°W

(These towns are listed as "historical" by the USGS.)

=== Adjacent townships ===
- Ora Township (east)
- Levan Township (southeast)
- Kinkaid Township (south)
- Degognia Township (southwest)

=== Cemeteries ===
The township contains eleven cemeteries: Barrow, Calvary, Cheatham, Evergreen, Koehn, Kross, Looney Springs, Modglin, Rogers, Saint Lukes and Saint Peters.

=== Major highways ===
- Illinois Route 4

== Demographics ==
As of the 2020 census there were 1,908 people, 574 households, and 401 families residing in the township. The population density was 42.46 inhabitants per square mile (16.39/km^{2}). There were 806 housing units at an average density of 17.94 per square mile (6.93/km^{2}). The racial makeup of the township was 96.54% White, 0.00% African American, 0.37% Native American, 0.05% Asian, 0.10% Pacific Islander, 0.31% from other races, and 2.62% from two or more races. Hispanic or Latino of any race were 1.31% of the population.

There were 574 households, out of which 24.20% had children under the age of 18 living with them, 53.66% were married couples living together, 12.37% had a female householder with no spouse present, and 30.14% were non-families. 27.90% of all households were made up of individuals, and 13.20% had someone living alone who was 65 years of age or older. The average household size was 2.55 and the average family size was 3.11.

The township's age distribution consisted of 19.7% under the age of 18, 14.0% from 18 to 24, 21.9% from 25 to 44, 27.9% from 45 to 64, and 16.4% who were 65 years of age or older. The median age was 40.9 years. For every 100 females, there were 93.0 males. For every 100 females age 18 and over, there were 101.9 males.

The median income for a household in the township was $58,167, and the median income for a family was $76,563. Males had a median income of $44,375 versus $26,442 for females. The per capita income for the township was $29,844. About 5.7% of families and 8.5% of the population were below the poverty line, including 18.1% of those under age 18 and 13.3% of those age 65 or over.

Historical population
Census	Pop.	Note	%±
2000	1,671		—
2010	1,951		16.8%
2020	1,908		−2.2%
U.S. Decennial Census

== School districts ==
- Trico Community Unit School District 176

== Political districts ==
- Illinois' 12th congressional district
- State House District 115
- State Senate District 58
