= Crain, Illinois =

- Unincorporated community
- Location within Illinois Location within the United States
- Coordinates: 37°46′48″N 89°30′28″W
- Country: United States
- State: Illinois
- County: Jackson
- Elevation: 381 ft (116 m)
- Time zone: UTC-6 (Central (CST))
  - Summer (DST): UTC-5 (CDT)
- Area code: 618
- GNIS feature ID: 422588

Crain is an unincorporated community in Kinkaid Township, Jackson County, Illinois, United States. Crain is located on Illinois Route 3, 9.5 miles (15.3 km) west of Murphysboro.
