= Charlie High =

American baseball player (1898–1960)

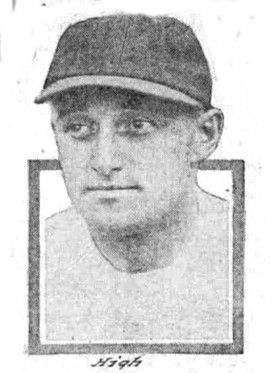
Charlie High
- Outfielder
- Born: December 1, 1898; Ava, Illinois
- Died: September 1, 1960 (aged 61); Oak Grove, Oregon
- Batted: Left Threw: Right

MLB debut
- September 5, 1919, for the Philadelphia Athletics

Last MLB appearance
- October 1, 1920, for the Philadelphia Athletics

MLB statistics
- Batting average: .234
- Home runs: 1
- Runs batted in: 7
- Stats at Baseball Reference

Teams
- Philadelphia Athletics (1919–1920)

Charles Edwin High (December 1, 1898 – September 1, 1960) was an American professional baseball player who appeared in 28 career games as an outfielder and pinch hitter for the Philadelphia Athletics of Major League Baseball during the 1919 and 1920 seasons. High, who played 14 seasons (1919–1932) in the minor leagues, was the youngest of three brothers (with Andy and Hugh) to play in the majors.

Born in Ava, Illinois, Charlie High batted left-handed and threw right-handed; he was listed as 5 feet 9 inches (1.75 m) tall and 170 pounds (77 kg). He attended St. Louis University. In his two late-season trials with the 1919–1920 Athletics, High collected 22 hits, with two doubles, one triple, and one home run—hit September 16, 1920, off Joe DeBerry of the St. Louis Browns at Sportsman's Park. He batted .234.

As a minor leaguer, High appeared in 1,675 games, batting .321 with 1,849 career hits.
