= Pomona, Illinois =

- Unincorporated community
- Location within Illinois Location within the United States
- Coordinates: 37°37′41″N 89°20′12″W
- Country: United States
- State: Illinois
- County: Jackson
- Elevation: 407 ft (124 m)
- Time zone: UTC-6 (Central (CST))
  - Summer (DST): UTC-5 (CDT)
- ZIP code: 62975
- Area code: 618
- GNIS feature ID: 415992

Pomona is an unincorporated community in Pomona Township, Jackson County, Illinois, United States. Pomona is located in the Shawnee National Forest 10 miles (16 km) south of Murphysboro. Pomona has no post office as of 2010 ZIP code 62975.

The community was featured in the 2002 Steve James documentary Stevie.
