= Boskydell, Illinois =

- Unincorporated community
- Location within Illinois Location within the United States
- Coordinates: 37.671°N 89.214°W
- Country: United States
- State: Illinois
- County: Jackson
- Elevation: 413 ft (126 m)
- Time zone: UTC-6 (Central (CST))
  - Summer (DST): UTC-5 (CDT)
- GNIS feature ID: 404705

Boskydell is an unincorporated community in Makanda Township, Jackson County, Illinois, United States.

The community became known for its high-quality sandstone, mined from two nearby quarries.

== History ==
As early as 1852, surveyors for the Illinois Central Railroad discovered a very good deposit of sandstone at Boskydell. The sandstone was used to build bridges and abutments when constructing the railroad, and a siding was built to the quarry in Boskydell. As the settlement along the tracks began to grow, the siding was used as a shipping point for agricultural products and lumber. The quarry operator, Samuel Cleland, surveyed and laid out town lots in 1876 near the railroad and named the town Boskydell ("brushy valley"). A village grew around the railroad stop, and soon had a blacksmith shop, two general stores, two cream stations and a cooperage.

A post office was established in 1885. A second quarry was opened around this date.

Boskydell sandstone was valued for its warm, reddish-brown color, and was used in the construction of several prominent buildings in Illinois, including: the foundation of the Southern Illinois University in nearby Carbondale; a Methodist church in Murphysboro; the First Presbyterian Church in Carbondale; and the former First Baptist Church of Carbondale. Local gravestones were carved from Boskydell sandstone, as may be seen in Oakland Cemetery and in Woodlawn Cemetery in Carbondale. Most notably, Boskydell sandstone was used in the construction of the great columns on the north, east, and south sides of the Illinois State Capitol in Springfield, Illinois. The trimmings on the front of the capitol building are also Boskydell sandstone.

In 1883, the Boskydell quarries were purchased by a stone merchant in Chicago, Mr. Rawles, who installed about forty thousand dollars' worth of modern machinery, including hoisting machines, dressing machines, steam drills, saws, and a gravity railroad from the quarries to the Illinois Central Railway.

By 1909, Boskydell had several thriving businesses including a bank, two livery stables, a rifle range, a grain warehouse, a saw mill, four grocery stores and a tonsorial parlor (barber shop). There was also a school.

Today, a scattering of residents live in the quiet community, and the quarries have been closed several years.

The Boskydell Baptist Church continues to be a center of the community, constituted in 1906 as the Boskydell Free Baptist Church with the Rev. A. J. Rendleman as pastor.
