= De Soto, Illinois =

Village in Jackson County, Illinois, United States

- Village
- Location of De Soto in Jackson County, Illinois
- Coordinates: 37°48′58″N 89°13′37″W
- Country: United States
- State: Illinois
- County: Jackson
- Township: De Soto

Area
  - Total: 0.92 sq mi (2.39 km^{2})
  - Land: 0.91 sq mi (2.36 km^{2})
  - Water: 0.012 sq mi (0.03 km^{2})
- Elevation: 404 ft (123 m)

Population (2020)
  - Total: 1,407
  - Density: 1,542.3/sq mi (595.48/km^{2})
- Demonym: De Soto Rat
- Time zone: UTC-6 (CST)
  - Summer (DST): UTC-5 (CDT)
- ZIP code: 62924
- Area code: 618
- FIPS code: 17-19616
- GNIS feature ID: 2398695
- Website: villageofdesoto.com

De Soto is a village in Jackson County, Illinois, United States. The population was 1,407 at the 2020 census. It is named for Hernando de Soto, the discoverer of the Mississippi River.

== History ==
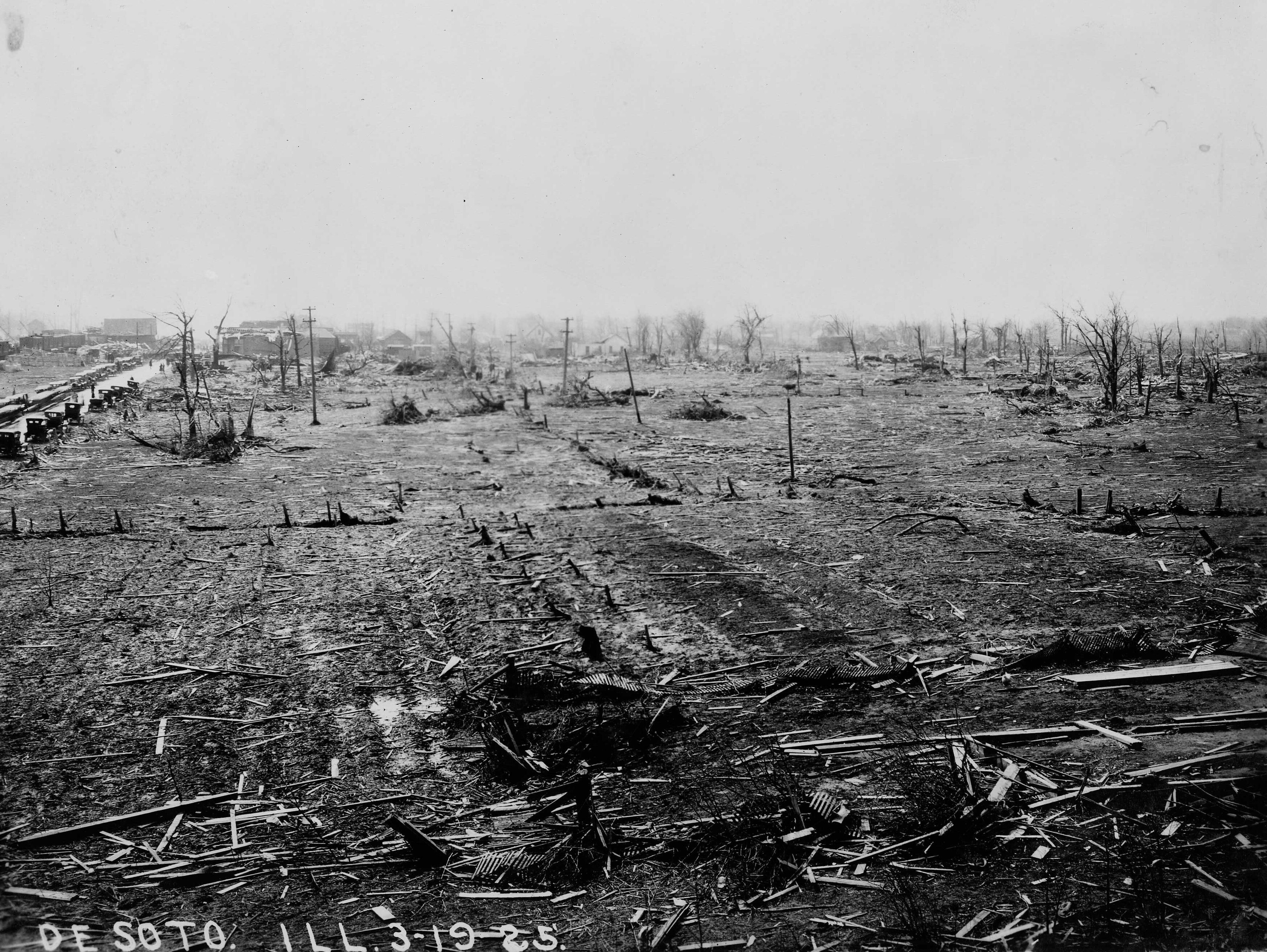
Destruction after the 1925 tornado

De Soto was laid out in 1854 when the railroad was extended to that point. The village's name honors Hernando de Soto (c. 1496/1497–1542), a Spanish conquistador who explored the region in 1541–2. A post office has been in operation at De Soto since 1855.

De Soto was largely destroyed by the Great Tri-State Tornado of 1925. Sixty-nine people died in De Soto when approximately 30% of the town was destroyed, and of this total 33 were children at a local school that collapsed from the winds. The tornado affected Missouri, Illinois, and Indiana, killing 695 and injuring over 2,000.

== Geography ==
De Soto is located in northeastern Jackson County. U.S. Route 51 passes through the center of the village, leading north 13 miles (21 km) to Du Quoin and south 6 miles (10 km) to Carbondale. Illinois Route 149 crosses US-51 in the village center, leading southwest 7 miles (11 km) to Murphysboro, the Jackson county seat, and east 5 miles (8 km) to Hurst.

According to the 2021 census gazetteer files, De Soto has a total area of 0.92 square miles (2.38 km^{2}), of which 0.91 square miles (2.36 km^{2}) (or 98.70%) is land and 0.01 square miles (0.03 km^{2}) (or 1.30%) is water. The Big Muddy River, a tributary of the Mississippi River, flows to the east and south of the village limits.

== Demographics ==
Historical population
Census	Pop.	Note	%±
1890	376		—
1900	560		48.9%
1910	644		15.0%
1920	703		9.2%
1930	673		−4.3%
1940	656		−2.5%
1950	646		−1.5%
1960	723		11.9%
1970	966		33.6%
1980	1,589		64.5%
1990	1,500		−5.6%
2000	1,653		10.2%
2010	1,590		−3.8%
2020	1,407		−11.5%
U.S. Decennial Census

=== 2020 census ===
As of the 2020 census, De Soto had a population of 1,407. There were 401 families residing in the village. The median age was 37.6 years. 21.4% of residents were under the age of 18 and 16.8% of residents were 65 years of age or older. For every 100 females there were 92.0 males, and for every 100 females age 18 and over there were 92.0 males age 18 and over.

0.0% of residents lived in urban areas, while 100.0% lived in rural areas.

There were 618 households in De Soto, of which 27.7% had children under the age of 18 living in them. Of all households, 40.3% were married-couple households, 19.3% were households with a male householder and no spouse or partner present, and 31.2% were households with a female householder and no spouse or partner present. About 34.0% of all households were made up of individuals and 11.8% had someone living alone who was 65 years of age or older.

The population density was 1,522.73 inhabitants per square mile (587.93/km^{2}). There were 708 housing units at an average density of 766.23 per square mile (295.84/km^{2}). Of the 708 housing units, 12.7% were vacant. The homeowner vacancy rate was 2.2% and the rental vacancy rate was 13.7%.

Racial composition as of the 2020 census
Race	Number	Percent
White	1,231	87.5%
Black or African American	58	4.1%
American Indian and Alaska Native	6	0.4%
Asian	0	0.0%
Native Hawaiian and Other Pacific Islander	0	0.0%
Some other race	11	0.8%
Two or more races	101	7.2%
Hispanic or Latino (of any race)	45	3.2%

=== Income and poverty ===
The median income for a household in the village was $44,744, and the median income for a family was $65,216. Males had a median income of $35,635 versus $27,703 for females. The per capita income for the village was $23,418. About 5.7% of families and 17.7% of the population were below the poverty line, including 8.5% of those under age 18 and 21.4% of those age 65 or over.

== Education ==
It is in the De Soto Consolidated School District 86 and the Carbondale Community High School District 165.
