= Degognia, Illinois =

- Unincorporated community
- Location within Illinois Location within the United States
- Coordinates: 37°51′40″N 89°37′49″W
- Country: United States
- State: Illinois
- County: Jackson
- Elevation: 705 ft (215 m)
- Time zone: UTC-6 (Central (CST))
  - Summer (DST): UTC-5 (CDT)
- Area code: 618
- GNIS feature ID: 422613

Degognia is an unincorporated community in Degognia Township, Jackson County, Illinois, United States. The community is located along County Route 20 11.1 miles (17.9 km) east-southeast of Chester.
