= Vergennes Township, Jackson County, Illinois =

Vergennes Township
- Township
- Location in Jackson County

- Jackson County's location in Illinois
- Coordinates: 37°54′21″N 89°19′03″W
- Country: United States
- State: Illinois
- County: Jackson
- Established: November 4, 1884

Area
  - Total: 37.33 sq mi (96.7 km^{2})
  - Land: 36.56 sq mi (94.7 km^{2})
  - Water: 0.76 sq mi (2.0 km^{2}) 2.04%
- Elevation: 410 ft (125 m)

Population (2020)
  - Total: 717
  - Density: 19.6/sq mi (7.57/km^{2})
- Time zone: UTC-6 (CST)
  - Summer (DST): UTC-5 (CDT)
- ZIP codes: 62274, 62832, 62932, 62966, 62994
- FIPS code: 17-077-77538

Vergennes Township is one of sixteen townships in Jackson County, Illinois, USA. As of the 2020 census, its population was 717 and it contained 321 housing units.

== Geography ==
According to the 2021 census gazetteer files, Vergennes Township has a total area of 37.33 square miles (96.68 km^{2}), of which 36.56 square miles (94.69 km^{2}) (or 97.96%) is land and 0.76 square miles (1.97 km^{2}) (or 2.04%) is water.

=== Cities, towns, villages ===
- Vergennes

=== Unincorporated towns ===
- Grubbs at 37.934495°N 89.3637°W

(This list is based on USGS data and may include former settlements.)

=== Adjacent townships ===
- Elk Township (east)
- DeSoto Township (southeast)
- Somerset Township (south)
- Levan Township (southwest)
- Ora Township (west)

=== Cemeteries ===
The township contains these two cemeteries: Parrish and Tuthill.

=== Major highways ===
- Illinois Route 4
- Illinois Route 13

== Demographics ==
As of the 2020 census there were 717 people, 268 households, and 197 families residing in the township. The population density was 19.21 inhabitants per square mile (7.42/km^{2}). There were 321 housing units at an average density of 8.60 per square mile (3.32/km^{2}). The racial makeup of the township was 94.42% White, 0.28% African American, 0.14% Native American, 0.14% Asian, 0.00% Pacific Islander, 0.14% from other races, and 4.88% from two or more races. Hispanic or Latino of any race were 1.95% of the population.

There were 268 households, out of which 28.40% had children under the age of 18 living with them, 52.24% were married couples living together, 16.04% had a female householder with no spouse present, and 26.49% were non-families. 21.60% of all households were made up of individuals, and 14.90% had someone living alone who was 65 years of age or older. The average household size was 2.79 and the average family size was 3.24.

The township's age distribution consisted of 21.8% under the age of 18, 8.3% from 18 to 24, 31.7% from 25 to 44, 18.5% from 45 to 64, and 19.7% who were 65 years of age or older. The median age was 36.9 years. For every 100 females, there were 126.0 males. For every 100 females age 18 and over, there were 117.5 males.

The median income for a household in the township was $50,000, and the median income for a family was $51,490. Males had a median income of $15,000 versus $33,750 for females. The per capita income for the township was $23,919. About 8.1% of families and 6.3% of the population were below the poverty line, including 4.9% of those under age 18 and 7.5% of those age 65 or over.

Historical population
Census	Pop.	Note	%±
2000	820		—
2010	771		−6.0%
2020	717		−7.0%
U.S. Decennial Census

== School districts ==
- Elverado Community Unit School District 196

== Political districts ==
- Illinois' 12th congressional district
- State House District 115
- State Senate District 58
