= Andy High =

American baseball player (1897–1981)

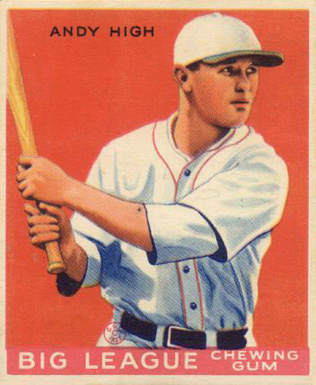
- Third baseman
- Born: November 21, 1897; Ava, Illinois, U.S.
- Died: February 18, 1981 (aged 83); Sylvania, Ohio, U.S.
- Batted: Left Threw: Right

MLB debut
- April 12, 1922, for the Brooklyn Robins

Last MLB appearance
- September 30, 1934, for the Philadelphia Phillies

MLB statistics
- Batting average: .284
- Home runs: 44
- Runs batted in: 482
- Stats at Baseball Reference

Teams
- Brooklyn Robins (1922–1925); Boston Braves (1925–1927); St. Louis Cardinals (1928–1931); Cincinnati Reds (1932–1933); Philadelphia Phillies (1934)

Career highlights and awards
- World Series champion (1931)

Andrew Aird High (November 21, 1897 – February 18, 1981) was an American professional baseball third baseman, scout and coach. He played in Major League Baseball (MLB) for the Brooklyn Robins, Boston Braves, St. Louis Cardinals, Cincinnati Reds and Philadelphia Phillies between 1922 and 1934.

High was relatively small for a third baseman, at 5 feet 6 inches (1.68 m) tall and 155 pounds (70 kg). He batted left-handed and threw right-handed. His brothers Hugh and Charlie also played in the major leagues.

== Career ==
High appeared in 1,314 games played in the major leagues and made 1,250 hits, including 195 doubles, 65 triples and 44 home runs. In his best season, 1924 with Brooklyn, High collected 191 hits and batted .328.

He was a member of three National League champions as a St. Louis Cardinal, in 1928, 1930 and 1931. In 34 World Series at bats, High collected ten hits, batting .294. In the decisive Game 7 of the 1931 World Series, High, batting leadoff, had three hits in four at bats and ignited a pair of two-run rallies, scoring twice and helping the Redbirds build a 4–0 lead; their foes, the defending world champion Philadelphia Athletics, could not recover, and St. Louis won the world title.

== Later life ==
High was a player/manager in the minor leagues from 1934 to 1936. He coached for the Brooklyn Dodgers in 1937–38 and then became a scout and, eventually, director of scouting for the Dodgers until his retirement in 1963. During his quarter-century scouting career, the Dodgers won nine NL pennants in Brooklyn and Los Angeles, and three World Series titles.

High died in 1981 at a healthcare facility in Sylvania, Ohio. He was buried at a cemetery in Webster Groves, Missouri.
