= Reeds Station, Illinois =

- Unincorporated community
- Location within Illinois Location within the United States
- Coordinates: 37°46′40″N 89°09′39″W
- Country: United States
- State: Illinois
- County: Jackson
- Elevation: 410 ft (120 m)
- Time zone: UTC-6 (Central (CST))
  - Summer (DST): UTC-5 (CDT)
- Area code: 618
- GNIS feature ID: 416496

Reeds Station (also known as Reeds) is an unincorporated community in DeSoto Township, Jackson County, Illinois, United States. The community is located along County Route 11 4.6 miles (7.4 km) northeast of Carbondale.
