= Hallidayboro, Illinois =

- Unincorporated community
- Location within Illinois Location within the United States
- Coordinates: 37°53′20″N 89°14′13″W
- Country: United States
- State: Illinois
- County: Jackson
- Elevation: 407 ft (124 m)
- Time zone: UTC-6 (Central (CST))
  - Summer (DST): UTC-5 (CDT)
- Area code: 618
- GNIS feature ID: 409668

Hallidayboro is an unincorporated community in Elk Township, Jackson County, Illinois, United States. The community is located along U.S. Route 51 1.5 miles (2.4 km) south of Elkville.
