= Hugh High =

American baseball player (1888–1962)

- Outfielder
- Born: October 24, 1888; Pottstown, Pennsylvania, U.S.
- Died: November 16, 1962 (aged 75); St. Louis, Missouri, U.S.
- Batted: Left Threw: Left

MLB debut
- April 11, 1913, for the Detroit Tigers

Last MLB appearance
- May 22, 1918, for the New York Yankees

MLB statistics
- Batting average: .250
- Home runs: 3
- Runs batted in: 123
- Stats at Baseball Reference

Teams
- Detroit Tigers (1913–1914); New York Yankees (1915–1918)

Hugh Jenkin High (October 24, 1888 – November 16, 1962), nicknamed "Bunny," was an American baseball player. He played professional baseball as an outfielder for 15 years from 1911 to 1925, including six years in Major League Baseball for the Detroit Tigers in 1913 and 1914 and for the New York Yankees from 1915 through 1918. He compiled a career batting average of .250 and led the American League's outfielders with a .981 fielding percentage in 1915. He later played for the Vernon Tigers in the Pacific Coast League from 1919 to 1923.

== Early years ==
High was born in Pottstown, Pennsylvania, in 1888. He is the older brother of Andy High and Charlie High, both of whom also played in Major League Baseball

== Professional baseball ==
High began playing professional baseball with the Hartford Senators in 1911 and 1912. He compiled a .327 batting average in 1912.

After the 1912 season, High signed with the Detroit Tigers as insurance in the event Ty Cobb held out due to a salary dispute. Cobb did hold out during the early weeks of the 1913 season, and High stepped in as the Tigers' starting center fielder. During the 1913 and 1914 seasons, High appeared in 171 games for the Tigers, principally as a backup for Ty Cobb in center field, and compiled a .248 batting average and .349 on-base percentage.

On February 4, 1915, High was sold to the New York Yankees along with Wally Pipp. Between 1915 and 1918, High appeared in 345 games for the Yankees, served as the team's starting left fielder in 1916 and 1917, and compiled a .250 batting average and .343 on-base percentage. He also led all American League outfielders with a .981 fielding percentage in 1915.

He appeared in his final major league game on May 22, 1918, although continued to play in the minor leagues for several years thereafter. From 1919 to 1923, he played for the Vernon Tigers in the Pacific Coast League. His best season with Vernon was 1923 when he compiled a .340 batting average and .461 on-base percentage in 132 games. He concluded his playing career with the Columbus Senators in 1924 and Reading Keystones in 1925.

== Later years ==
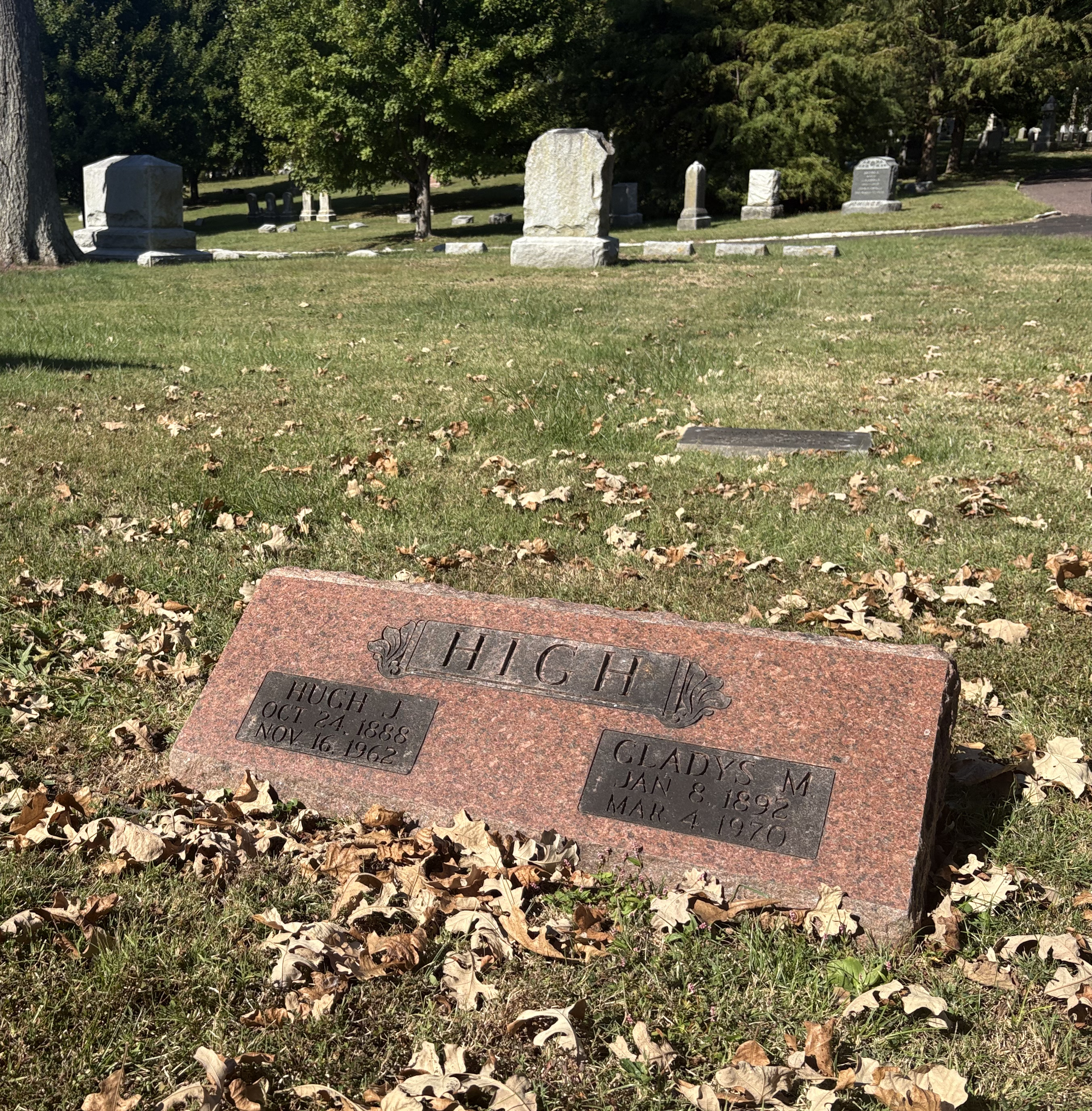
High's grave at Bellefontaine Cemetery

In November 1962, Hugh died at Park Lane Hospital in St. Louis, Missouri, after a long illness. He was buried at Bellefontaine Cemetery in St. Louis.
