= Elk Township, Jackson County, Illinois =

Elk Township
- Township
- Location in Jackson County

- Jackson County's location in Illinois
- Coordinates: 37°54′11″N 89°12′19″W
- Country: United States
- State: Illinois
- County: Jackson
- Established: November 4, 1884

Area
  - Total: 37.25 sq mi (96.5 km^{2})
  - Land: 35.76 sq mi (92.6 km^{2})
  - Water: 1.50 sq mi (3.9 km^{2}) 4.02%
- Elevation: 367 ft (112 m)

Population (2020)
  - Total: 1,746
  - Density: 48.83/sq mi (18.85/km^{2})
- Time zone: UTC-6 (CST)
  - Summer (DST): UTC-5 (CDT)
- ZIP codes: 62832, 62924, 62927, 62932, 62994
- FIPS code: 17-077-23217

Elk Township is one of sixteen townships in Jackson County, Illinois, USA. As of the 2020 census, its population was 1,746 and it contained 849 housing units.

== Geography ==
According to the 2021 census gazetteer files, Elk Township has a total area of 37.25 square miles (96.48 km^{2}), of which 35.76 square miles (92.62 km^{2}) (or 95.98%) is land and 1.50 square miles (3.88 km^{2}) (or 4.02%) is water.

=== Cities, towns, villages ===
- Dowell
- Elkville

=== Unincorporated towns ===
- Hallidayboro at 37.888939°N 89.237028°W

(This list is based on USGS data and may include former settlements.)

=== Adjacent townships ===
- Tyrone Township, Franklin County (northeast)
- Six Mile Township, Franklin County (east)
- De Soto Township (south)
- Somerset Township (southwest)
- Vergennes Township (west)

=== Cemeteries ===
The township contains these eight cemeteries: Davis, Davis Number 1, Dutch Hill, Elkville, Gill, Greer, Rees and Russian Orthodox.

=== Major highways ===
- U.S. Route 51

=== Lakes ===
- Campbell Lake
- Fox Lake
- Snider Lake

== Demographics ==
As of the 2020 census there were 1,746 people, 633 households, and 408 families residing in the township. The population density was 46.87 inhabitants per square mile (18.10/km^{2}). There were 849 housing units at an average density of 22.79 per square mile (8.80/km^{2}). The racial makeup of the township was 89.63% White, 2.23% African American, 0.40% Native American, 0.34% Asian, 0.11% Pacific Islander, 0.97% from other races, and 6.30% from two or more races. Hispanic or Latino of any race were 2.23% of the population.

There were 633 households, out of which 21.60% had children under the age of 18 living with them, 51.66% were married couples living together, 6.48% had a female householder with no spouse present, and 35.55% were non-families. 29.10% of all households were made up of individuals, and 13.30% had someone living alone who was 65 years of age or older. The average household size was 2.27 and the average family size was 2.80.

The township's age distribution consisted of 20.8% under the age of 18, 8.0% from 18 to 24, 18.9% from 25 to 44, 28.9% from 45 to 64, and 23.5% who were 65 years of age or older. The median age was 46.2 years. For every 100 females, there were 107.4 males. For every 100 females age 18 and over, there were 102.5 males.

The median income for a household in the township was $39,179, and the median income for a family was $40,729. Males had a median income of $32,250 versus $22,679 for females. The per capita income for the township was $22,358. About 15.4% of families and 18.4% of the population were below the poverty line, including 32.4% of those under age 18 and 5.3% of those age 65 or over.

Historical population
Census	Pop.	Note	%±
2000	1,994		—
2010	1,907		−4.4%
2020	1,746		−8.4%
U.S. Decennial Census

== School districts ==
- DuQuoin Community Unit School District 300
- Elverado Community Unit School District 196

== Political districts ==
- Illinois' 12th congressional district
- State House District 115
- State Senate District 58
