= Howardton, Illinois =

- Unincorporated community
- Location within Illinois Location within the United States
- Coordinates: 37°37′45″N 89°27′52″W
- Country: United States
- State: Illinois
- County: Jackson
- Elevation: 354 ft (108 m)
- Time zone: UTC-6 (Central (CST))
  - Summer (DST): UTC-5 (CDT)
- Area code: 618
- GNIS feature ID: 410616

Howardton is an unincorporated community in Grand Tower Township, Jackson County, Illinois, United States. The community is located along the Union Pacific Railroad 1.8 miles (2.9 km) east of Grand Tower.
