= Oraville, Illinois =

- Unincorporated community
- Location within Illinois Location within the United States
- Coordinates: 37°51′54″N 89°23′00″W
- Country: United States
- State: Illinois
- County: Jackson
- Elevation: 394 ft (120 m)
- Time zone: UTC-6 (Central (CST))
  - Summer (DST): UTC-5 (CDT)
- ZIP code: 62971
- Area code: 618
- GNIS feature ID: 415158

Oraville is an unincorporated community in Jackson County, Illinois, United States. Oraville is located along Illinois Route 4, 7 miles (11 km) south-southeast of Ava. Oraville has a post office with ZIP code 62971.
