= Grand Tower Township, Jackson County, Illinois =

Grand Tower Township
- Township
- Location in Jackson County

- Jackson County's location in Illinois
- Coordinates: 37°38′14″N 89°28′24″W
- Country: United States
- State: Illinois
- County: Jackson
- Established: November 4, 1884

Area
  - Total: 33.42 sq mi (86.6 km^{2})
  - Land: 31.56 sq mi (81.7 km^{2})
  - Water: 1.86 sq mi (4.8 km^{2}) 5.55%
- Elevation: 360 ft (110 m)

Population (2020)
  - Total: 567
  - Density: 18.0/sq mi (6.94/km^{2})
- Time zone: UTC-6 (CST)
  - Summer (DST): UTC-5 (CDT)
- ZIP codes: 62940, 62942, 62966
- FIPS code: 17-077-30783

Grand Tower Township is one of sixteen townships in Jackson County, Illinois, USA. As of the 2020 census, its population was 567 and it contained 308 housing units.

== Geography ==
According to the 2021 census gazetteer files, Grand Tower Township has a total area of 33.42 square miles (86.56 km^{2}), of which 31.56 square miles (81.74 km^{2}) (or 94.45%) is land and 1.86 square miles (4.82 km^{2}) (or 5.55%) is water.

A small portion of Missouri, known as Grand Tower Island, lies on the Mississippi River's eastern side adjacent to Grand Tower Township. Partially surrounded by an oxbow lake, the island can only be accessed by water or by a road that begins and ends in Illinois.

=== Cities, towns, villages ===
- Grand Tower

=== Unincorporated towns ===
- Howardton at 37.629217°N 89.464539°W

(This list is based on USGS data and may include former settlements.)

=== Adjacent townships ===
- Sand Ridge Township (north)
- Pomona Township (east)
- Fountain Bluff Township (northwest)

=== Cemeteries ===
The township contains these four cemeteries: Goodbread, Henson, Hudson and Walker Hill.

=== Major highways ===
- Illinois Route 3

=== Rivers ===
- Mississippi River

== Demographics ==
As of the 2020 census there were 567 people, 241 households, and 156 families residing in the township. The population density was 16.97 inhabitants per square mile (6.55/km^{2}). There were 308 housing units at an average density of 9.22 per square mile (3.56/km^{2}). The racial makeup of the township was 94.36% White, 0.35% African American, 0.00% Native American, 0.00% Asian, 0.00% Pacific Islander, 0.88% from other races, and 4.41% from two or more races. Hispanic or Latino of any race were 1.59% of the population.

There were 241 households, out of which 27.80% had children under the age of 18 living with them, 47.30% were married couples living together, 9.13% had a female householder with no spouse present, and 35.27% were non-families. 19.90% of all households were made up of individuals, and 8.30% had someone living alone who was 65 years of age or older. The average household size was 2.64 and the average family size was 3.08.

The township's age distribution consisted of 22.3% under the age of 18, 12.9% from 18 to 24, 24.7% from 25 to 44, 28.2% from 45 to 64, and 11.8% who were 65 years of age or older. The median age was 37.0 years. For every 100 females, there were 112.0 males. For every 100 females age 18 and over, there were 111.1 males.

The median income for a household in the township was $52,917, and the median income for a family was $65,469. Males had a median income of $41,282 versus $21,500 for females. The per capita income for the township was $24,436. About 4.5% of families and 12.0% of the population were below the poverty line, including 16.5% of those under age 18 and 21.3% of those age 65 or over.

Historical population
Census	Pop.	Note	%±
2000	767		—
2010	707		−7.8%
2020	567		−19.8%
U.S. Decennial Census

== School districts ==
- Shawnee Community Unit School District 84

== Political districts ==
- Illinois' 12th congressional district
- State House District 115
- State Senate District 58
