= Makanda Township, Jackson County, Illinois =

Makanda Township
- Township
- Location in Jackson County

- Jackson County's location in Illinois
- Coordinates: 37°37′57″N 89°12′50″W
- Country: United States
- State: Illinois
- County: Jackson
- Established: November 4, 1884

Area
  - Total: 37.88 sq mi (98.1 km^{2})
  - Land: 37.09 sq mi (96.1 km^{2})
  - Water: 0.79 sq mi (2.0 km^{2}) 2.08%
- Elevation: 420 ft (128 m)

Population (2020)
  - Total: 4,034
  - Density: 108.8/sq mi (41.99/km^{2})
- Time zone: UTC-6 (CST)
  - Summer (DST): UTC-5 (CDT)
- ZIP codes: 62901, 62920, 62958
- FIPS code: 17-077-46227
- Website: makandatownship.org

Makanda Township is one of sixteen townships in Jackson County, Illinois, USA. As of the 2020 census, its population was 4,034 and it contained 1,996 housing units.

== Geography ==
According to the 2021 census gazetteer files, Makanda Township has a total area of 37.88 square miles (98.11 km^{2}), of which 37.09 square miles (96.06 km^{2}) (or 97.92%) is land and 0.79 square miles (2.05 km^{2}) (or 2.08%) is water.

=== Cities, towns, villages ===
- Carbondale (south edge)
- Makanda

=== Unincorporated towns ===
- Boskydell at 37.671161°N 89.213694°W
- Stone Fort at 37.623384°N 89.196749°W

(This list is based on USGS data and may include former settlements.)

=== Adjacent townships ===
- Carbondale Township (north)
- Pomona Township (west)
- Murphysboro Township (northwest)

=== Cemeteries ===
The township contains these thirteen cemeteries: Boskydell, Evergreen, Hilton, Lirley, Makanda, Rowan, Sheppard, South County Line, Stearns, Union Hills, Wilkins, Zimmerman and Zion.

=== Major highways ===
- U.S. Route 51

=== Lakes ===
- Little Grassy Lake (Illinois)
- Spring Arbor Lake

=== Landmarks ===
- Giant City State Park

== Demographics ==
As of the 2020 census there were 4,034 people, 1,643 households, and 1,135 families residing in the township. The population density was 106.51 inhabitants per square mile (41.12/km^{2}). There were 1,996 housing units at an average density of 52.70 per square mile (20.35/km^{2}). The racial makeup of the township was 82.70% White, 4.09% African American, 0.40% Native American, 4.07% Asian, 0.07% Pacific Islander, 1.54% from other races, and 7.14% from two or more races. Hispanic or Latino of any race were 4.21% of the population.

There were 1,643 households, out of which 30.70% had children under the age of 18 living with them, 58.43% were married couples living together, 6.63% had a female householder with no spouse present, and 30.92% were non-families. 25.20% of all households were made up of individuals, and 11.10% had someone living alone who was 65 years of age or older. The average household size was 2.54 and the average family size was 3.06.

The township's age distribution consisted of 23.4% under the age of 18, 7.2% from 18 to 24, 18.4% from 25 to 44, 32.4% from 45 to 64, and 18.7% who were 65 years of age or older. The median age was 45.9 years. For every 100 females, there were 101.5 males. For every 100 females age 18 and over, there were 105.5 males.

The median income for a household in the township was $71,250, and the median income for a family was $91,802. Males had a median income of $42,813 versus $29,306 for females. The per capita income for the township was $38,866. About 4.0% of families and 8.4% of the population were below the poverty line, including 2.8% of those under age 18 and 8.7% of those age 65 or over.

Historical population
Census	Pop.	Note	%±
2000	3,964		—
2010	4,353		9.8%
2020	4,034		−7.3%
U.S. Decennial Census

== School districts ==
Unity Point District 140 and Carbondale Community Consolidated High School in Carbondale, IL

== Political districts ==
- Illinois' 12th congressional district
- State House District 115
- State Senate District 58
