= West Point, Jackson County, Illinois =

- Unincorporated community
- Location within Illinois Location within the United States
- Coordinates: 37°53′56″N 89°37′19″W
- Country: United States
- State: Illinois
- County: Jackson
- Elevation: 594 ft (181 m)
- Time zone: UTC-6 (Central (CST))
  - Summer (DST): UTC-5 (CDT)
- Area code: 618
- GNIS feature ID: 1772247

West Point is an unincorporated community in Bradley Township, Jackson County, Illinois, United States. The community is located along County Route 1 4.5 miles (7.2 km) west-southwest of Campbell Hill.
