= Sand Ridge, Illinois =

- Unincorporated community
- Location within Illinois Location within the United States
- Coordinates: 37°44′24″N 89°26′33″W
- Country: United States
- State: Illinois
- County: Jackson
- Elevation: 371 ft (113 m)
- Time zone: UTC-6 (Central (CST))
  - Summer (DST): UTC-5 (CDT)
- Area code: 618
- GNIS feature ID: 417946

Sand Ridge is an unincorporated community along the Big Muddy River in Sand Ridge Township, Jackson County, Illinois, United States. Sand Ridge is located at the intersection of County Routes 5 and 6 2.8 miles (4.5 km) northeast of Gorham.
