= Etherton, Illinois =

- Unincorporated community
- Location within Illinois Location within the United States
- Coordinates: 37°41′07″N 89°19′16″W
- Country: United States
- State: Illinois
- County: Jackson
- Elevation: 394 ft (120 m)
- Time zone: UTC-6 (Central (CST))
  - Summer (DST): UTC-5 (CDT)
- Area code: 618
- GNIS feature ID: 422677

Etherton is an unincorporated community in Pomona Township, Jackson County, Illinois, United States. The community is located along Illinois Route 127 5.5 miles (8.9 km) south of Murphysboro.
