= Harrison, Jackson County, Illinois =

- Census-designated place
- Location within Illinois Location within the United States
- Coordinates: 37°47′53″N 89°20′11″W
- Country: United States
- State: Illinois
- County: Jackson
- Township: Somerset

Area
  - Total: 2.14 sq mi (5.55 km^{2})
  - Land: 2.10 sq mi (5.45 km^{2})
  - Water: 0.035 sq mi (0.09 km^{2})
- Elevation: 407 ft (124 m)

Population (2020)
  - Total: 895
  - Density: 425.0/sq mi (164.08/km^{2})
- Time zone: UTC-6 (Central (CST))
  - Summer (DST): UTC-5 (CDT)
- Area code: 618
- FIPS code: 17-33162
- GNIS feature ID: 2628552

Harrison is a census-designated place in Jackson County, Illinois, United States. Its population was 895 as of the 2020 census.

== Geography ==
According to the 2021 census gazetteer files, Harrison has a total area of 2.14 square miles (5.54 km^{2}), of which 2.11 square miles (5.46 km^{2}) (or 98.32%) is land and 0.04 square miles (0.10 km^{2}) (or 1.68%) is water.

== Demographics ==
Historical population
Census	Pop.	Note	%±
2010	970		—
2020	895		−7.7%
U.S. Decennial Census

As of the 2020 census there were 895 people, 403 households, and 229 families residing in the CDP. The population density was 417.83 inhabitants per square mile (161.33/km^{2}). There were 455 housing units at an average density of 212.42 per square mile (82.02/km^{2}). The racial makeup of the CDP was 87.49% White, 5.81% African American, 0.78% Native American, 0.22% Asian, 0.00% Pacific Islander, 1.79% from other races, and 3.91% from two or more races. Hispanic or Latino of any race were 3.02% of the population.

There were 403 households, out of which 32.5% had children under the age of 18 living with them, 19.85% were married couples living together, 34.74% had a female householder with no husband present, and 43.18% were non-families. 34.74% of all households were made up of individuals, and 15.88% had someone living alone who was 65 years of age or older. The average household size was 3.22 and the average family size was 2.32.

The CDP's age distribution consisted of 35.0% under the age of 18, 2.9% from 18 to 24, 22.4% from 25 to 44, 20.8% from 45 to 64, and 18.8% who were 65 years of age or older. The median age was 34.0 years. For every 100 females, there were 68.6 males. For every 100 females age 18 and over, there were 69.1 males.

The median income for a household in the CDP was $48,977, and the median income for a family was $76,317. Males had a median income of $32,396 versus $44,250 for females. The per capita income for the CDP was $23,942. About 3.9% of families and 8.4% of the population were below the poverty line, including 0.0% of those under age 18 and 9.1% of those age 65 or over.

== Education ==
It is in the Murphysboro Community Unit School District 186.
