= Jones Ridge, Illinois =

- Unincorporated community
- Location within Illinois Location within the United States
- Coordinates: 37°48′01″N 89°37′31″W
- Country: United States
- State: Illinois
- County: Jackson
- Elevation: 367 ft (112 m)
- Time zone: UTC-6 (Central (CST))
  - Summer (DST): UTC-5 (CDT)
- Area code: 618
- GNIS feature ID: 411220

Jones Ridge is an unincorporated community in Degognia Township, Jackson County, Illinois, United States. The community is located along County Route 9 and the Union Pacific Railroad 9.5 miles (15.3 km) west-northwest of Gorham.
