= Pomona Township, Jackson County, Illinois =

Pomona Township
- Township
- Location in Jackson County

- Jackson County's location in Illinois
- Coordinates: 37°38′32″N 89°20′53″W
- Country: United States
- State: Illinois
- County: Jackson
- Established: November 4, 1884

Area
  - Total: 52.71 sq mi (136.5 km^{2})
  - Land: 49.97 sq mi (129.4 km^{2})
  - Water: 2.74 sq mi (7.1 km^{2}) 5.20%
- Elevation: 505 ft (154 m)

Population (2020)
  - Total: 794
  - Density: 15.9/sq mi (6.13/km^{2})
- Time zone: UTC-6 (CST)
  - Summer (DST): UTC-5 (CDT)
- ZIP codes: 62901, 62905, 62958, 62966, 62975
- FIPS code: 17-077-60963
- Website: pomonatownship.org

Pomona Township is one of sixteen townships in Jackson County, Illinois, USA. As of the 2020 census, its population was 794 and it contained 368 housing units.

== Geography ==
According to the 2021 census gazetteer files, Pomona Township has a total area of 52.71 square miles (136.52 km^{2}), of which 49.97 square miles (129.42 km^{2}) (or 94.80%) is land and 2.74 square miles (7.10 km^{2}) (or 5.20%) is water.

=== Unincorporated towns ===
- Etherton at 37.685328°N 89.321199°W
- Pomona at 37.628106°N 89.336756°W

(This list is based on USGS data and may include former settlements.)

=== Extinct towns ===
- Eltham at 37.669495°N 89.334811°W

(These towns are listed as "historical" by the USGS.)

=== Adjacent townships ===
- Murphysboro Township (north)
- Carbondale Township (northeast)
- Makanda Township (east)
- Grand Tower Township (west)
- Sand Ridge Township (northwest)

=== Cemeteries ===
The township contains these five cemeteries: Dutch Ridge, Etherton, Hagler, Mount Pleasant and Stearns.

== Demographics ==
As of the 2020 census there were 794 people, 224 households, and 130 families residing in the township. The population density was 15.06 inhabitants per square mile (5.81/km^{2}). There were 368 housing units at an average density of 6.98 per square mile (2.69/km^{2}). The racial makeup of the township was 93.07% White, 0.25% African American, 0.88% Native American, 0.76% Asian, 0.00% Pacific Islander, 0.50% from other races, and 4.53% from two or more races. Hispanic or Latino of any race were 2.39% of the population.

There were 224 households, out of which 22.80% had children under the age of 18 living with them, 55.80% were married couples living together, 0.00% had a female householder with no spouse present, and 41.96% were non-families. 24.60% of all households were made up of individuals, and 12.90% had someone living alone who was 65 years of age or older. The average household size was 2.32 and the average family size was 2.95.

The township's age distribution consisted of 24.0% under the age of 18, 0.0% from 18 to 24, 18.1% from 25 to 44, 31.7% from 45 to 64, and 26.2% who were 65 years of age or older. The median age was 57.7 years. For every 100 females, there were 115.8 males. For every 100 females age 18 and over, there were 97.5 males.

The median income for a household in the township was $57,813, and the median income for a family was $78,056. Males had a median income of $30,341 versus $44,702 for females. The per capita income for the township was $36,745. About 7.7% of families and 17.9% of the population were below the poverty line, including 21.6% of those under age 18 and 16.2% of those age 65 or over.

Historical population
Census	Pop.	Note	%±
2000	815		—
2010	802		−1.6%
2020	794		−1.0%
U.S. Decennial Census

== School districts ==
- Cobden School Unit District 17
- Murphysboro Community Unit School District 186

== Political districts ==
- Illinois' 12th congressional district
- State House District 115
- State Senate District 58
