= Carbondale Community High School =

Coordinates: 37°43′33″N 89°11′17″W

Location
- 1301 East Walnut Street; Carbondale, Illinois 62901

Information
- Type: Public
- School district: Carbondale Community High School District 165
- Superintendent: Daniel Booth
- CEEB code: 140510
- NCES School ID: 170837000454
- Principal: Ryan Thomas
- Teaching staff: 72.67
- Grades: 9–12
- Enrollment: 995 (2023–2024)
- Average class size: 18
- Student to teacher ratio: 13.69
- Language: English
- Color
- Fight song: Derivative of "On Wisconsin"
- Athletics conference: South Seven Conference
- Mascot: Scottish Terrier
- Communities served: Carbondale, De Soto, Makanda
- Feeder schools: Carbondale Middle School, Unity Point Elementary School, Giant City School, De Soto Grade School, St. Andrew School, Carbondale New School, Trinity Christian School
- Website: cchs165.jacksn.k12.il.us

Carbondale Community High School is a public high school located in Carbondale, Illinois, United States. It serves grades 9–12 and is the sole school in District 165, having several different feeder schools within the city and outside of it. During the 2023–24 school year, 995 students attended the school.

The district includes Carbondale, De Soto, and Makanda.

== Notable alumni ==
- Ron Acks (1944-2023) – American football player
- Stephen Bardo (1986) – basketball player
- Shawn Colvin (1978) – Grammy-award winning musical artist
- Justin Dentmon (2004) – basketball player
- Ben Falcone (1991) – an American actor, comedian and filmmaker.
- Mark Gottfried – basketball player, head coach
- Troy Hudson – NBA basketball player
- John Ratcliffe (1983) – 9th Director of the Central Intelligence Agency, 6th Director of National Intelligence, and former U.S. Representative for Texas's 4th district
- David Sulzer/Dave Soldier (1974) – attended two years; neuroscientist at Columbia University and experimental musician
- Les Taylor (1968) – basketball player
