= Carbondale Township, Jackson County, Illinois =

Carbondale Township
- Township
- Location in Jackson County

- Jackson County's location in Illinois
- Coordinates: 37°43′48″N 89°12′35″W
- Country: United States
- State: Illinois
- County: Jackson
- Established: November 4, 1884

Area
  - Total: 38.17 sq mi (98.9 km^{2})
  - Land: 37.41 sq mi (96.9 km^{2})
  - Water: 0.76 sq mi (2.0 km^{2}) 2.00%
- Elevation: 400 ft (122 m)

Population (2020)
  - Total: 24,686
  - Density: 659.9/sq mi (254.8/km^{2})
- Time zone: UTC-6 (CST)
  - Summer (DST): UTC-5 (CDT)
- ZIP codes: 62901, 62966
- FIPS code: 17-077-11170
- Website: carbondaletownship.org

Carbondale Township is one of sixteen townships in Jackson County, Illinois, USA. As of the 2020 census, its population was 24,686 and it contained 13,823 housing units. Southern Illinois University is located in this township.

== Geography ==
According to the 2021 census gazetteer files, Carbondale Township has a total area of 38.17 square miles (98.86 km^{2}), of which 37.41 square miles (96.89 km^{2}) (or 98.00%) is land and 0.76 square miles (1.97 km^{2}) (or 2.00%) is water.

=== Cities, towns, villages ===
- Carbondale (vast majority)

=== Unincorporated towns ===
- Evergreen Terrace at 37.699217°N 89.23564°W
- Southern Hills at 37.703939°N 89.210639°W

(This list is based on USGS data and may include former settlements.)

=== Adjacent townships ===
- De Soto Township (north)
- Makanda Township (south)
- Pomona Township (southwest)
- Murphysboro Township (west)
- Somerset Township (northwest)

=== Cemeteries ===
The township contains these six cemeteries: Dillinger, North County Line, Oakland, Snider Hill, Winchester and Woodlawn.

=== Major highways ===
- U.S. Route 51
- Illinois Route 13

=== Airports and landing strips ===
- Memorial Hospital of Carbondale Heliport
- Southern Illinois Airport (southeast quarter)

=== Lakes ===
- Campus Lake

=== Landmarks ===
- Attucks Park
- Evergreen Park
- The Crossings
- University Mall

== Demographics ==
As of the 2020 census there were 24,686 people, 12,556 households, and 4,633 families residing in the township. The population density was 646.70 inhabitants per square mile (249.69/km^{2}). There were 13,823 housing units at an average density of 362.12 per square mile (139.82/km^{2}). The racial makeup of the township was 57.14% White, 23.61% African American, 0.49% Native American, 7.13% Asian, 0.07% Pacific Islander, 3.89% from other races, and 7.66% from two or more races. Hispanic or Latino of any race were 7.61% of the population.

There were 12,556 households, out of which 15.80% had children under the age of 18 living with them, 22.79% were married couples living together, 11.52% had a female householder with no spouse present, and 63.10% were non-families. 47.30% of all households were made up of individuals, and 8.40% had someone living alone who was 65 years of age or older. The average household size was 1.98 and the average family size was 2.84.

The township's age distribution consisted of 12.3% under the age of 18, 35.0% from 18 to 24, 23.9% from 25 to 44, 16.9% from 45 to 64, and 11.9% who were 65 years of age or older. The median age was 25.8 years. For every 100 females, there were 102.2 males. For every 100 females age 18 and over, there were 101.8 males.

The median income for a household in the township was $27,614, and the median income for a family was $63,892. Males had a median income of $20,695 versus $20,771 for females. The per capita income for the township was $23,718. About 20.6% of families and 36.1% of the population were below the poverty line, including 41.0% of those under age 18 and 9.0% of those age 65 or over.

Historical population
Census	Pop.	Note	%±
2000	24,660		—
2010	29,544		19.8%
2020	24,686		−16.4%
U.S. Decennial Census

== School districts ==
- Murphysboro Community Unit School District 186

== Political districts ==
- Illinois' 12th congressional district
- State House District 115
- State Senate District 58
