= Degognia Creek =

Stream in Illinois, U.S.

Coordinates: 37°48′11″N 89°40′27″W

Degognia Creek is a stream in and flows along the boundary between Jackson and Randolph counties in the U.S. state of Illinois. It is a tributary to the Mississippi River.

Degognia Creek was named for a ranger of mixed white and Native American descent.

== See also ==
- List of rivers of Illinois
