= Vergennes, Illinois =

- Village
- Location of Vergennes in Jackson County, Illinois
- Coordinates: 37°54′05″N 89°20′24″W
- Country: United States
- State: Illinois
- County: Jackson
- Township: Vergennes

Area
  - Total: 0.36 sq mi (0.92 km^{2})
  - Land: 0.35 sq mi (0.91 km^{2})
  - Water: 0 sq mi (0.00 km^{2})
- Elevation: 390 ft (120 m)

Population (2020)
  - Total: 235
  - Density: 667.9/sq mi (257.86/km^{2})
- Time zone: UTC-6 (CST)
  - Summer (DST): UTC-5 (CDT)
- ZIP code: 62994
- Area code: 618
- FIPS code: 17-77525
- GNIS feature ID: 2400057

Vergennes is a village in Jackson County, Illinois, United States, and was settled in 1846 as Middleton or Middletown. The population was 235 at the 2020 census.

== 2017 Tornado ==
On February 28, 2017, Vergennes was struck by a deadly tornado that originated from Perryville, Missouri, and continued towards Dowell, Illinois.

== Geography ==
Vergennes is located in northwestern Jackson County. Illinois Route 13 runs through the village, leading north 13 miles (21 km) to Pinckneyville and south 10 miles (16 km) to Murphysboro, the Jackson county seat.

According to the 2021 census gazetteer files, Vergennes has a total area of 0.35 square miles (0.91 km^{2}), of which 0.35 square miles (0.91 km^{2}) (or 99.44%) is land and 0.00 square miles (0.00 km^{2}) (or 0.56%) is water.

== Demographics ==
Historical population
| Census | Pop. | Note | %± |
|---|---|---|---|
| 1890 | 275 | | — |
| 1900 | 416 | | 51.3% |
| 1910 | 342 | | −17.8% |
| 1920 | 305 | | −10.8% |
| 1930 | 309 | | 1.3% |
| 1940 | 324 | | 4.9% |
| 1950 | 312 | | −3.7% |
| 1960 | 298 | | −4.5% |
| 1970 | 323 | | 8.4% |
| 1980 | 360 | | 11.5% |
| 1990 | 314 | | −12.8% |
| 2000 | 491 | | 56.4% |
| 2010 | 298 | | −39.3% |
| 2020 | 235 | | −21.1% |
U.S. Decennial Census

As of the 2020 census there were 235 people, 98 households, and 72 families residing in the village. The population density was 663.84 inhabitants per square mile (256.31/km^{2}). There were 113 housing units at an average density of 319.21 per square mile (123.25/km^{2}). The racial makeup of the village was 93.19% White, 0.43% African American, 0.43% Native American, 0.00% Asian, 0.00% Pacific Islander, 0.00% from other races, and 5.96% from two or more races. Hispanic or Latino of any race were 2.13% of the population.

There were 98 households, out of which 33.7% had children under the age of 18 living with them, 50.00% were married couples living together, 17.35% had a female householder with no husband present, and 26.53% were non-families. 23.47% of all households were made up of individuals, and 18.37% had someone living alone who was 65 years of age or older. The average household size was 2.86 and the average family size was 2.43.

The village's age distribution consisted of 26.1% under the age of 18, 8.0% from 18 to 24, 24.8% from 25 to 44, 21.5% from 45 to 64, and 19.7% who were 65 years of age or older. The median age was 37.2 years. For every 100 females, there were 116.4 males. For every 100 females age 18 and over, there were 85.3 males.

The median income for a household in the village was $41,875, and the median income for a family was $51,667. Males had a median income of $33,500 versus $22,188 for females. The per capita income for the village was $21,311. About 12.5% of families and 9.7% of the population were below the poverty line, including 13.1% of those under age 18 and 8.5% of those age 65 or over.

== Education ==
It is in the Elverado Community Unit School District 196. It operates Elverado Primary School (Elkville), Elverado Intermediate School (Vergennes), Elverado Junior High School (Vergennes), and Elverado High School (Elkville).
