= Grimsby, Illinois =

- Unincorporated community
- Location within Illinois Location within the United States
- Coordinates: 37°45′01″N 89°26′57″W
- Country: United States
- State: Illinois
- County: Jackson
- Elevation: 361 ft (110 m)
- Time zone: UTC-6 (Central (CST))
  - Summer (DST): UTC-5 (CDT)
- Area code: 618
- GNIS feature ID: 409513

Grimsby is an unincorporated community in Sand Ridge Township, Jackson County, Illinois, United States. Grimsby is located on County Route 6 and the Union Pacific Railroad 6.3 miles (10.1 km) west of Murphysboro.
