= Mount Carbon, Illinois =

- Unincorporated community
- Location within Illinois Location within the United States
- Coordinates: 37°45′07″N 89°19′16″W
- Country: United States
- State: Illinois
- County: Jackson
- Elevation: 482 ft (147 m)
- Time zone: UTC-6 (Central (CST))
  - Summer (DST): UTC-5 (CDT)
- Area code: 618
- GNIS feature ID: 413938

Mount Carbon is an unincorporated community in Murphysboro Township, Jackson County, Illinois, United States.
