= Dry Hill, Illinois =

- Unincorporated community
- Location within Illinois Location within the United States
- Country: United States
- State: Illinois
- County: Jackson
- Elevation: 725 ft (221 m)
- Time zone: UTC-6 (Central (CST))
  - Summer (DST): UTC-5 (CDT)
- Area code: 618
- GNIS feature ID: 422637

Dry Hill is an unincorporated community in Jackson County, in the U.S. state of Illinois.

== History ==
A post office opened at Dry Hill in 1871, and remained in operation until 1877. Some say the community was so named on account of its relatively high and dry elevation, while others believe the name may be derived from Samuel Dry, an early settler.
