= Ava, Illinois =

- City
- Location of Ava in Jackson County, Illinois
- Coordinates: 37°53′19″N 89°29′58″W
- Country: United States
- State: Illinois
- County: Jackson
- Township: Bradley

Area
  - Total: 1.07 sq mi (2.76 km^{2})
  - Land: 1.06 sq mi (2.74 km^{2})
  - Water: 0.0077 sq mi (0.02 km^{2})
- Elevation: 610 ft (190 m)

Population (2020)
  - Total: 553
  - Density: 523.1/sq mi (201.98/km^{2})
- Time zone: UTC-6 (CST)
  - Summer (DST): UTC-5 (CDT)
- ZIP code: 62907
- Area code: 618
- FIPS code: 17-03103
- GNIS feature ID: 2394039

Ava is a city in northwest Jackson County, Illinois, United States. The population was 553 at the 2020 census.

== Geography ==
Ava is located in northwestern Jackson County. Illinois Route 4 passes through the town as Knauer Street, leading northwest 15 miles (24 km) to Steeleville and east 10 miles (16 km) to its end at Illinois Route 13. Murphysboro, the county seat, is 14 miles (23 km) southeast of Ava.

According to the 2021 census gazetteer files, Ava has a total area of 1.07 square miles (2.77 km^{2}), of which 1.06 square miles (2.75 km^{2}) (or 99.16%) is land and 0.01 square miles (0.03 km^{2}) (or 0.84%) is water.

Historical population
Census	Pop.	Note	%±
1880	365		—
1890	807		121.1%
1900	984		21.9%
1910	780		−20.7%
1920	626		−19.7%
1930	615		−1.8%
1940	821		33.5%
1950	734		−10.6%
1960	665		−9.4%
1970	728		9.5%
1980	811		11.4%
1990	674		−16.9%
2000	662		−1.8%
2010	654		−1.2%
2020	553		−15.4%
U.S. Decennial Census

== Demographics ==
As of the 2020 census there were 553 people, 214 households, and 149 families residing in the city. The population density was 518.76 inhabitants per square mile (200.29/km^{2}). There were 296 housing units at an average density of 277.67 per square mile (107.21/km^{2}). The racial makeup of the city was 96.20% White, 0.00% African American, 1.08% Native American, 0.00% Asian, 0.36% Pacific Islander, 0.00% from other races, and 2.35% from two or more races. Hispanic or Latino of any race were 2.71% of the population.

There were 214 households, out of which 31.8% had children under the age of 18 living with them, 42.06% were married couples living together, 21.03% had a female householder with no husband present, and 30.37% were non-families. 25.70% of all households were made up of individuals, and 10.75% had someone living alone who was 65 years of age or older. The average household size was 3.07 and the average family size was 2.53.

The city's age distribution consisted of 28.8% under the age of 18, 6.5% from 18 to 24, 24.5% from 25 to 44, 23.3% from 45 to 64, and 16.8% who were 65 years of age or older. The median age was 35.2 years. For every 100 females, there were 83.4 males. For every 100 females age 18 and over, there were 87.8 males.

The median income for a household in the city was $47,262, and the median income for a family was $55,515. Males had a median income of $50,000 versus $24,375 for females. The per capita income for the city was $25,114. About 10.7% of families and 14.2% of the population were below the poverty line, including 23.7% of those under age 18 and 15.4% of those age 65 or over.

== Education ==
It is in the Trico Community Unit School District 176.

== Notable people ==
- Andy High, third baseman for various teams, brother of Charlie
- Charlie High, outfielder for the Philadelphia Athletics, brother of Andy
- Gale R. Williams, Illinois state representative

== See also ==
- List of cities in Illinois
