= Jackson County, Illinois =

County in Illinois, United States

- County
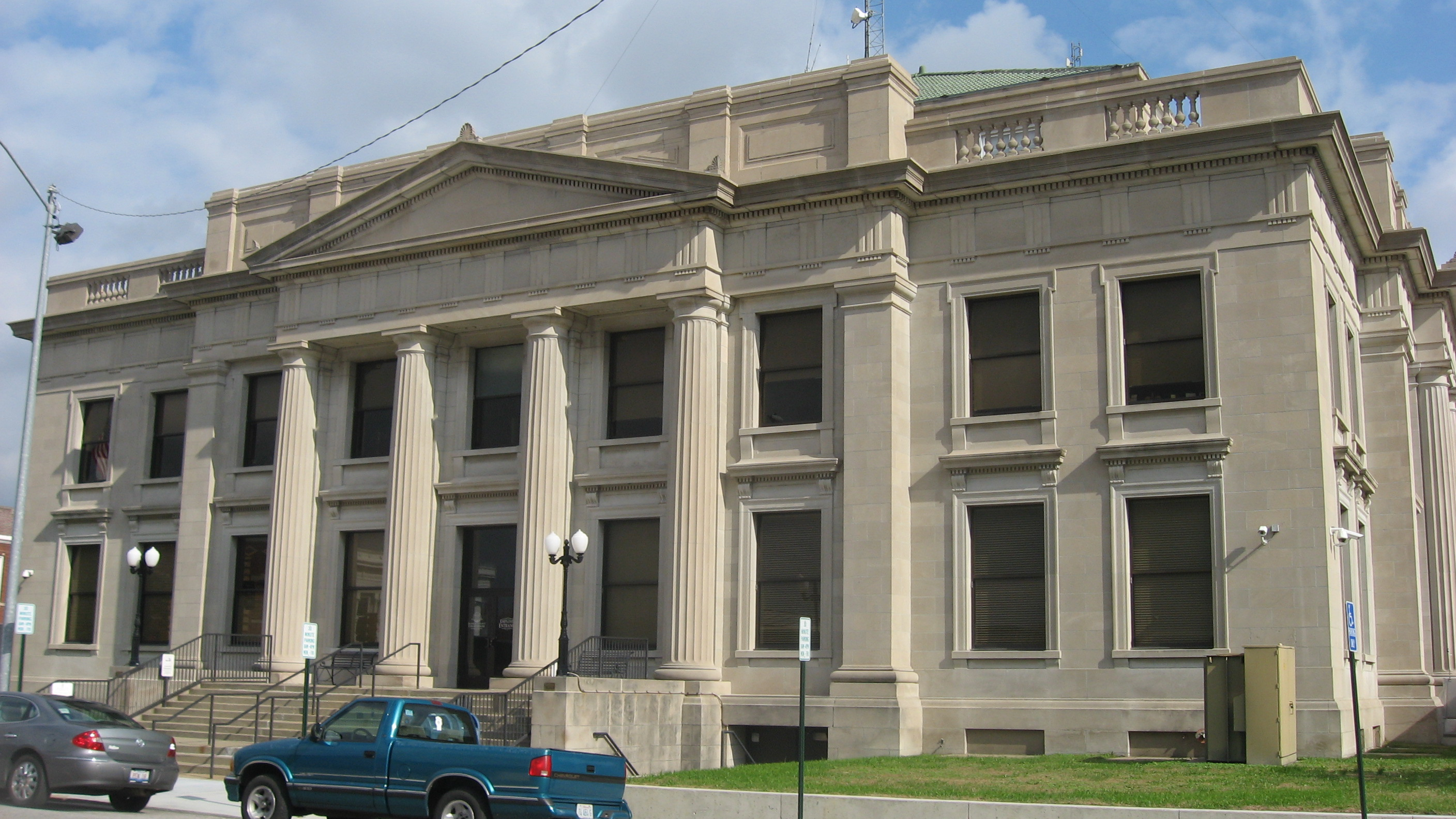
- Jackson County Courthouse in Murphysboro

- Location within the U.S. state of Illinois
- Coordinates: 37°47′N 89°23′W
- Country: United States
- State: Illinois
- Founded: January 10, 1816
- Named for: Andrew Jackson
- Seat: Murphysboro
- Largest city: Carbondale

Area
  - Total: 602 sq mi (1,560 km^{2})
  - Land: 584 sq mi (1,510 km^{2})
  - Water: 18 sq mi (47 km^{2}) 3.0%

Population (2020)
  - Total: 52,974
  - Estimate (2025): 52,501 ▼
  - Density: 90.7/sq mi (35.0/km^{2})
- Time zone: UTC−6 (Central)
  - Summer (DST): UTC−5 (CDT)
- Congressional district: 12th
- Website: www.jacksoncounty-il.gov

Jackson County is a county located in the U.S. state of Illinois with a population of 52,974 at the 2020 census, the county is located 98 miles southeast of St. Louis. Its county seat is Murphysboro, and its most populous city is Carbondale, home to the main campus of Southern Illinois University. The county was incorporated on January 10, 1816, and named for Andrew Jackson. The community of Brownsville served as the fledgling county's first seat. Jackson County is included in the Carbondale-Marion, IL Metropolitan Statistical Area. It is located in the southern portion of Illinois known locally as "Little Egypt".

== History ==
Human occupation of Jackson County began about 11,500 years ago. Extensive documentation of the area's indigenous peoples is ongoing. Exploration from the European explorers began with the Joliet-Marquette exploration along the Mississippi River. It was not until the 18th and 19th century when pioneer farmers began to settle in the area's inexpensive land along the Mississippi River and in the forested Shawnee hills with its one-hundred-foot trees.

As early as 1810 William Boone and his indentured servant Peter mined coal from the banks along Big Muddy River. This was Illinois' first coal mine. By 1813, Conrad Will, namesake of Will County, conducted a large salt extraction operation using slave labor on the banks of the Big Muddy River, south of today's Murphysboro. As this was in the "free" Northwest Territory, Will had to have a legal exemption to own slaves. Jackson County, Illinois' ninth county to be organized, was organized in 1816, having been carved out of Randolph County, Illinois on the north and Johnson County, Illinois on the South. It was named for Andrew Jackson, who had just defeated the British Army at the Battle of New Orleans. Brownsville, located near Will's salt works, was established as the county seat. When the courthouse burned in 1843, the county voted to move the county seat to a more central location. Murphysboro, located on land owned by Dr. John and Elizabeth (Jenkins) Logan, became the second county seat in September 1843. It was named after William C. Murphy, one of the three Commissioners appointed to select the site.

Civil War Major General John A. Logan, Dr. John and Elizabeth Logan's son, was born in what is now Murphysboro on February 9, 1826. During the Civil War he moved to Carbondale, about 10 miles (16 km) east of his birthplace. He moved to Chicago in 1871. During his residence in Carbondale, he took part in a Memorial Day observation at that city's Woodlawn Cemetery. In 1868, Logan, as Commander of the Grand Army of the Republic, issued General Order No. 11 which established Memorial Day as a national holiday.

On March 18, 1925, the great Tri-State Tornado ripped through Jackson County, leaving devastation in its path. The villages of Gorham and De Soto and the city of Murphysboro were hit especially hard.

The county courthouse is in downtown Murphysboro. The current reinforced concrete courthouse, completed in 1928, replaced earlier brick structures.

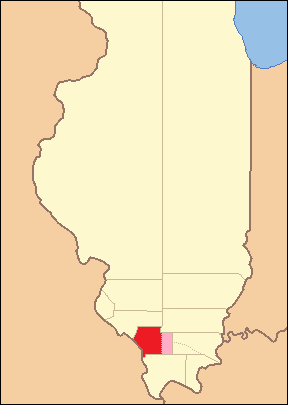
Jackson County (1816–1818), including unorganized territory (formerly part of Johnson County) temporarily attached to it

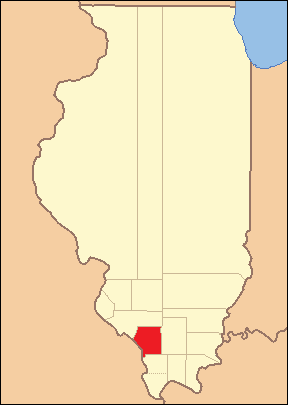
Jackson County (1818–1827)

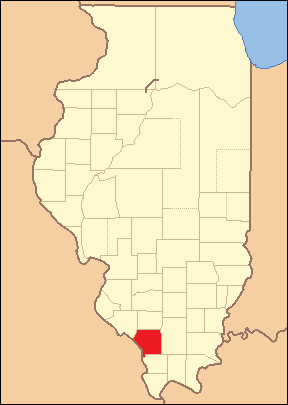
Jackson County (1827–present)

== Geography ==
According to the US Census Bureau, the county has a total area of 602 square miles (1,560 km^{2}), of which 584 square miles (1,510 km^{2}) is land and 18 square miles (47 km^{2}) (3.0%) is water. The average elevation is around 400 feet (120 m), except near the Mississippi River.

The first coal mine in Illinois was opened on the south bank of the Big Muddy River near the present-day Route 127 Bridge.

=== Climate and weather ===
Murphysboro, Illinois

Climate chart (precipitation, max. and min. temperature)
J	F	M	A	M	J	J	A	S	O	N	D
2.9 39 21	3 45 24	4.3 55 33	4.5 66 42	4.8 76 52	4.8 84 61	3.4 88 66	3.9 87 63	3.1 80 55	2.9 69 43	4.6 55 35	3.7 44 26
- █ Average max. and min. temperatures in °F
- █ Precipitation totals in inches
- Source: The Weather Channel
Metric conversion
J	F	M	A	M	J	J	A	S	O	N	D
74 4 −6	76 7 −4	108 13 1	113 19 6	121 24 11	121 29 16	85 31 19	100 31 17	80 27 13	74 21 6	117 13 2	94 7 −3
- █ Average max. and min. temperatures in °C
- █ Precipitation totals in mm

In recent years, average temperatures in the county seat of Murphysboro have ranged from a low of 21 °F (−6 °C) in January to a high of 88 °F (31 °C) in July, although a record low of −25 °F (−32 °C) was recorded in January 1977 and a record high of 113 °F (45 °C) was recorded in August 1930. Average monthly precipitation ranged from 2.91 inches (74 mm) in January to 4.78 inches (121 mm) in May.

=== Major highways ===
- U.S. Highway 51
- Illinois Route 3
- Illinois Route 4
- Illinois Route 13
- Illinois Route 127
- Illinois Route 149
- Illinois Route 151

=== Transit ===
==== Local ====
- JAX Mass Transit
  - Saluki Express
- Rides Mass Transit District
- Shawnee Mass Transit District
- South Central Transit

==== Intercity ====
- Amtrak at Carbondale station
- Greyhound Lines
- List of intercity bus stops in Illinois

=== Adjacent counties ===
- Perry County (north)
- Franklin County (northeast)
- Williamson County (east)
- Union County (south)
- Cape Girardeau County, Missouri (southwest)
- Perry County, Missouri (west)
- Randolph County (northwest)

=== Protected areas ===
- Crab Orchard National Wildlife Refuge (part)
- Shawnee National Forest (part)
- Giant City State Park

== Demographics ==
Historical population
Census	Pop.	Note	%±
1820	1,542		—
1830	1,828		18.5%
1840	3,566		95.1%
1850	5,862		64.4%
1860	9,589		63.6%
1870	19,634		104.8%
1880	22,505		14.6%
1890	27,809		23.6%
1900	33,871		21.8%
1910	35,143		3.8%
1920	37,091		5.5%
1930	35,680		−3.8%
1940	37,920		6.3%
1950	38,124		0.5%
1960	42,151		10.6%
1970	55,008		30.5%
1980	61,522		11.8%
1990	61,067		−0.7%
2000	59,612		−2.4%
2010	60,218		1.0%
2020	52,974		−12.0%
2025 (est.)	52,501	▼	−0.9%
US Decennial Census; 1790-1960 1900-1990; 1990-2000 2010-2013

2000 census age pyramid for Jackson County, skewed by Southern Illinois University

=== 2020 census ===
As of the 2020 census, the county had a population of 52,974. The median age was 34.9 years, 19.3% of residents were under the age of 18, and 17.2% of residents were 65 years of age or older. For every 100 females there were 98.9 males, and for every 100 females age 18 and over there were 97.9 males age 18 and over.

The racial makeup of the county was 72.1% White, 14.3% Black or African American, 0.4% American Indian and Alaska Native, 3.9% Asian, 0.1% Native Hawaiian and Pacific Islander, 2.7% from some other race, and 6.6% from two or more races. Hispanic or Latino residents of any race accounted for 5.4% of the population.

59.1% of residents lived in urban areas, while 40.9% lived in rural areas.

There were 23,193 households in the county, of which 23.0% had children under the age of 18 living in them. Of all households, 34.7% were married-couple households, 25.8% were households with a male householder and no spouse or partner present, and 32.0% were households with a female householder and no spouse or partner present. About 38.7% of all households were made up of individuals and 12.2% had someone living alone who was 65 years of age or older.

There were 27,743 housing units, of which 16.4% were vacant. Among occupied housing units, 52.1% were owner-occupied and 47.9% were renter-occupied. The homeowner vacancy rate was 3.6% and the rental vacancy rate was 17.5%.

=== Racial and ethnic composition ===
Jackson County, Illinois – Racial and ethnic composition Note: the US Census treats Hispanic/Latino as an ethnic category. This table excludes Latinos from the racial categories and assigns them to a separate category. Hispanics/Latinos may be of any race.
Race / Ethnicity (NH = Non-Hispanic)	Pop 1980	Pop 1990	Pop 2000	Pop 2010	Pop 2020	% 1980	% 1990	% 2000	% 2010	% 2020
White alone (NH)	53,434	51,409	47,445	45,746	37,513	86.85%	84.18%	79.59%	75.97%	70.81%
Black or African American alone (NH)	5,651	6,259	7,694	8,488	7,503	9.19%	10.25%	12.91%	14.10%	14.16%
Native American or Alaska Native alone (NH)	91	101	165	176	114	0.15%	0.17%	0.28%	0.29%	0.22%
Asian alone (NH)	704	2,164	1,799	1,890	2,048	1.14%	3.54%	3.02%	3.14%	3.87%
Native Hawaiian or Pacific Islander alone (NH)	x	x	32	28	24	x	x	0.05%	0.05%	0.05%
Other race alone (NH)	930	52	92	111	239	1.51%	0.09%	0.15%	0.18%	0.45%
Mixed race or Multiracial (NH)	x	x	942	1,376	2,696	x	x	1.58%	2.29%	5.09%
Hispanic or Latino (any race)	712	1,082	1,443	2,403	2,837	1.16%	1.77%	2.42%	3.99%	5.36%
Total	61,522	61,067	59,612	60,218	52,974	100.00%	100.00%	100.00%	100.00%	100.00%

=== 2010 census ===
As of the 2010 United States census, there were 60,218 people, 25,538 households, and 12,621 families residing in the county. The population density was 103.1 inhabitants per square mile (39.8/km^{2}). There were 28,578 housing units at an average density of 48.9 per square mile (18.9/km^{2}). The racial makeup of the county was 77.8% white, 14.3% black or African American, 3.2% Asian, 0.4% American Indian, 0.1% Pacific islander, 1.6% from other races, and 2.6% from two or more races. Those of Hispanic or Latino origin made up 4.0% of the population. In terms of ancestry, 26.0% were German, 14.5% were Irish, 10.6% were English, and 5.7% were American.

Of the 25,538 households, 23.0% had children under the age of 18 living with them, 35.5% were married couples living together, 10.2% had a female householder with no husband present, 50.6% were non-families, and 35.1% of all households were made up of individuals. The average household size was 2.20 and the average family size was 2.87. The median age was 29.1 years.

The median income for a household in the county was $32,169 and the median income for a family was $50,787. Males had a median income of $42,747 versus $31,244 for females. The per capita income for the county was $19,294. About 17.4% of families and 28.5% of the population were below the poverty line, including 32.1% of those under age 18 and 7.9% of those age 65 or over.

== Economy ==
Much of the county's economic situation is dependent upon Southern Illinois University Carbondale and the city of Carbondale. A rapidly developing city, it is part of the Metro Lakeland area consisting mainly of the major communities of Carbondale, Marion, Herrin, and Carterville. The outer regions of the Metro include Murphysboro, the rest of Jackson County, the rest of Williamson County, Perry County, and Saline County. Jackson County is also located near the Shawnee Hills Wine Trail.

== Communities ==
=== Cities ===
- Ava
- Carbondale (mostly)
- Grand Tower
- Murphysboro (seat)

=== Villages ===
- Campbell Hill
- De Soto
- Dowell
- Elkville
- Gorham
- Makanda
- Vergennes

=== Census-designated place ===
- Harrison

=== Unincorporated communities ===
- Boskydell
- Cora
- Crain
- Degognia
- Dry Hill
- Etherton
- Glenn
- Grimsby
- Hallidayboro
- Howardton
- Jacob
- Jones Ridge
- Mount Carbon
- Neunert
- Oraville
- Pomona
- Raddle
- Reeds Station
- Sand Ridge
- Sato
- West Point

=== Ghost town ===
- Brownsville

=== Townships ===
- Bradley
- Carbondale
- DeSoto
- Degognia
- Elk
- Fountain Bluff
- Grand Tower
- Kinkaid
- Levan
- Makanda
- Murphysboro
- Ora
- Pomona
- Sand Ridge
- Somerset
- Vergennes

== Politics ==
Jackson County has had a distinctive political history owing to the combination of its typically "Southern" Southern Illinois culture combined with the presence in recent times of a strong student voter population in Carbondale.

In its early years Jackson County was solidly Democratic; only one Republican presidential candidate won the county prior to 1892. In the following seven decades Jackson County turned solidly Republican, but Ronald Reagan was the last Republican to carry Jackson County in 1984.

United States presidential election results for Jackson County, Illinois
Year	Republican		Democratic		Third party(ies)	
Year	No.	%	No.	%	No.	%
1892	3,031	46.92%	2,858	44.24%	571	8.84%
1896	3,879	50.91%	3,631	47.65%	110	1.44%
1900	4,054	50.97%	3,723	46.81%	177	2.23%
1904	3,984	56.30%	2,350	33.21%	742	10.49%
1908	4,016	53.07%	3,149	41.61%	403	5.33%
1912	2,780	35.49%	3,323	42.42%	1,730	22.09%
1916	8,356	54.09%	6,780	43.89%	311	2.01%
1920	8,003	59.96%	4,575	34.28%	769	5.76%
1924	6,424	49.30%	4,707	36.12%	1,899	14.57%
1928	9,180	60.79%	5,836	38.64%	86	0.57%
1932	7,636	43.10%	9,730	54.93%	349	1.97%
1936	10,363	50.44%	9,971	48.53%	212	1.03%
1940	11,980	55.19%	9,600	44.22%	128	0.59%
1944	10,002	59.57%	6,735	40.11%	54	0.32%
1948	8,288	53.79%	6,939	45.04%	181	1.17%
1952	10,193	57.67%	7,457	42.19%	24	0.14%
1956	10,526	58.72%	7,391	41.23%	10	0.06%
1960	10,568	55.30%	8,527	44.62%	17	0.09%
1964	7,013	36.57%	12,165	63.43%	0	0.00%
1968	9,134	46.47%	8,856	45.05%	1,667	8.48%
1972	12,393	48.42%	13,146	51.36%	55	0.21%
1976	10,152	42.09%	12,940	53.64%	1,030	4.27%
1980	10,505	44.08%	10,291	43.19%	3,033	12.73%
1984	13,609	52.55%	12,105	46.74%	182	0.70%
1988	9,687	45.73%	11,334	53.50%	164	0.77%
1992	6,899	28.24%	13,373	54.73%	4,162	17.03%
1996	7,422	33.72%	12,214	55.49%	2,375	10.79%
2000	9,823	42.54%	11,773	50.99%	1,494	6.47%
2004	11,190	43.33%	14,300	55.37%	336	1.30%
2008	9,687	37.81%	15,248	59.52%	682	2.66%
2012	9,864	40.92%	13,319	55.26%	921	3.82%
2016	10,843	44.05%	11,634	47.26%	2,140	8.69%
2020	10,890	47.94%	11,181	49.22%	647	2.85%
2024	10,614	47.00%	11,394	50.46%	574	2.54%

== Education ==
K-12 school districts include:

- Cobden School Unit District 17
- Du Quoin Community Unit School District 300
- Elverado Community Unit School District 196
- Herrin Community Unit School District 4
- Murphysboro Community Unit School District 186
- Shawnee Community Unit School District 84
- Trico Community Unit School District 176

There is one secondary school district: Carbondale Community High School District 165.

Elementary districts include:

- Carbondale Elementary School District 95
- De Soto Consolidated School District 86
- Giant City Community Consolidated School District 130
- Unity Point Community Consolidated School District 140

== See also ==
- National Register of Historic Places listings in Jackson County, Illinois
