= Lake Murphysboro State Park =

State park in Jackson County, Illinois

- IUCN category III (natural monument or feature)
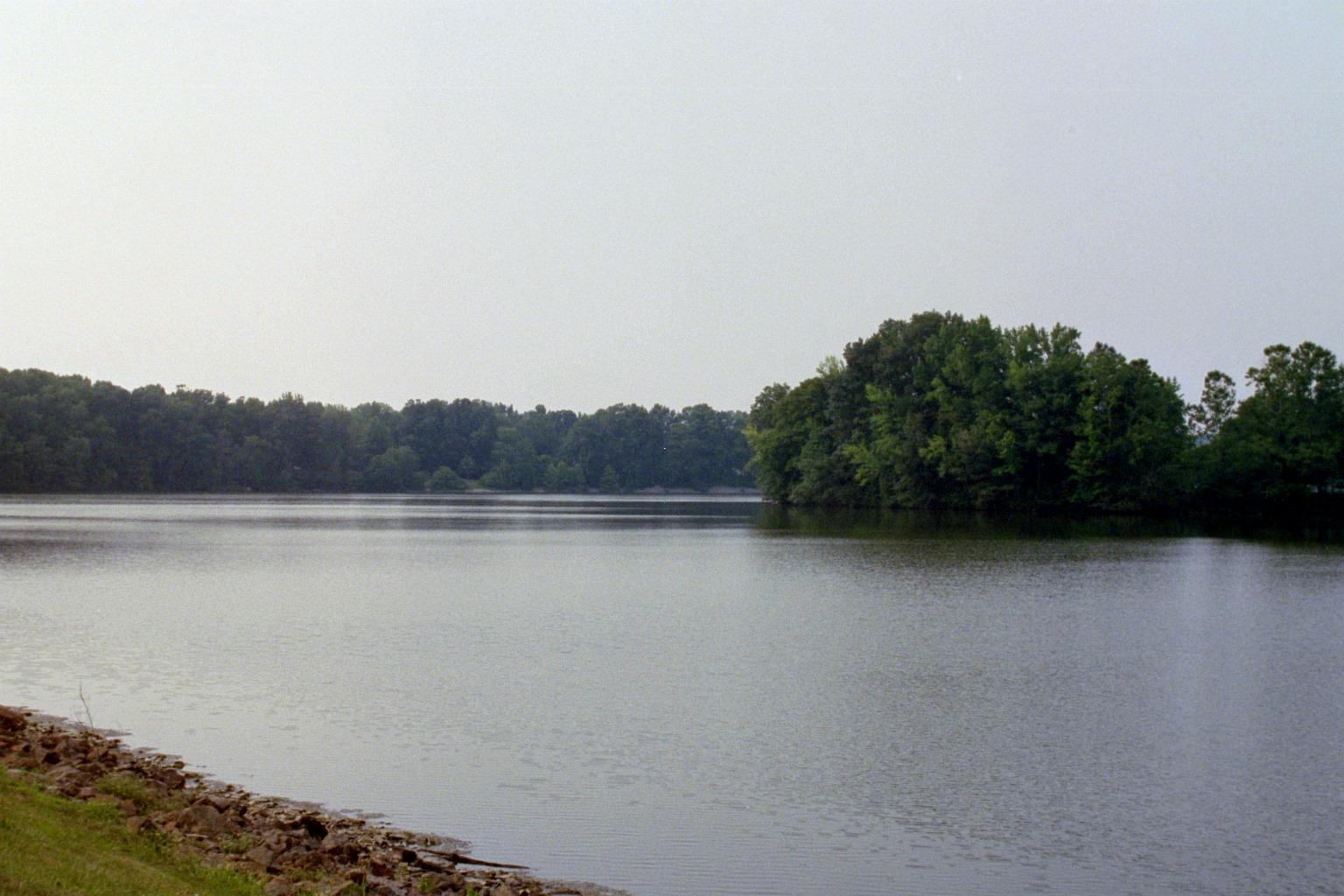

- Location within Illinois Location within the United States
- Location: Jackson County, Illinois, U.S.
- Nearest city: Murphysboro, Illinois
- Coordinates: 37°46′57″N 89°22′55″W
- Area: 1,022 acres (414 ha)
- Established: 1948
- Governing body: Illinois Department of Natural Resources

Lake Murphysboro State Park is an Illinois state park on 1,022 acres (414 ha) in Jackson County, Illinois, United States.

== In popular culture ==
The famous 2015 "it do go down" video was filmed in the lake, right before the dam drop to the Big Muddy River
