= Illinois Route 149 =

State highway in southern Illinois, US

Illinois Route 149
- IL 149 highlighted in red

Route information
- Maintained by IDOT
- Length: 45.92 mi (73.90 km)
- Existed: 1926–present

Major junctions
- West end: IL 3 in Gorham
- US 51 in DeSoto; I-57 in West Frankfort
- East end: IL 34 in Thompsonville

Location
- Country: United States
- State: Illinois
- Counties: Jackson, Williamson, Franklin

Highway system
- Illinois State Highway System; Interstate; US; State; Tollways; Scenic
← IL 148	→ US 150

Illinois Route 149 is an east–west state road in southern Illinois. It runs from Illinois Route 3 near Grimsby east to Illinois Route 34 in Thompsonville. This is a distance of 45.92 miles (73.90 km).

== Route description ==
Illinois 149 runs east–west through downtown Murphysboro and to the north of Carbondale. It also runs to the north of Herrin. West of Carbondale, Illinois 149 overlaps Illinois Routes 13 and 127. Through West Frankfort, Illinois 149 doubles as "Main Street."

== History ==
SBI Route 149 originally ran from Hurst to Thompsonville. On April 1, 1963, IL 149 was extended 21 miles (34 km) east over IL 144.

== Major intersections ==
County	Location	mi	km	Destinations	Notes
Jackson		0.0	0.0	IL 3 / Great River Road (National Route) / Lincoln Heritage Trail (Southern Branch) – Cairo, Chester	
Jackson	Murphysboro	8.1	13.0	IL 127 south (5th Street) – Jonesboro, Cairo	West end of IL 127 overlap
Jackson	Murphysboro	8.3	13.4	IL 13 east (Walnut Street) – Carbondale	West end of IL 13 overlap
Jackson	Murphysboro	9.2	14.8	IL 13 west (2nd Street) / IL 127 north – Pinckneyville	East end of IL 13 / IL 127 overlap
Jackson	De Soto	15.3	24.6	US 51 (Chestnut Street) – DuQuoin, Carbondale	
Franklin		25.9	41.7	IL 184 north (Main Street) – Mulkeytown	
Franklin	Zeigler	29.0	46.7	IL 148 – Christopher, Herrin	
Franklin	West Frankfort	35.5	57.1	I-57 – Mount Vernon, Cairo	Exit 65 (I-57)
Franklin	West Frankfort	36.2	58.3	IL 37 / Lincoln Heritage Trail (Southern Branch) (Logan Street) – Benton, Johnston City	
Franklin	Thompsonville	45.92	73.90	IL 34 (Shawneetown Road) – Benton, Harrisburg	
1.000 mi = 1.609 km; 1.000 km = 0.621 mi: Concurrency terminus
