= Tornado outbreak of March 17–18, 1925 =

1925 tornado outbreak in the U.S. states of Missouri, Illinois, and Indiana

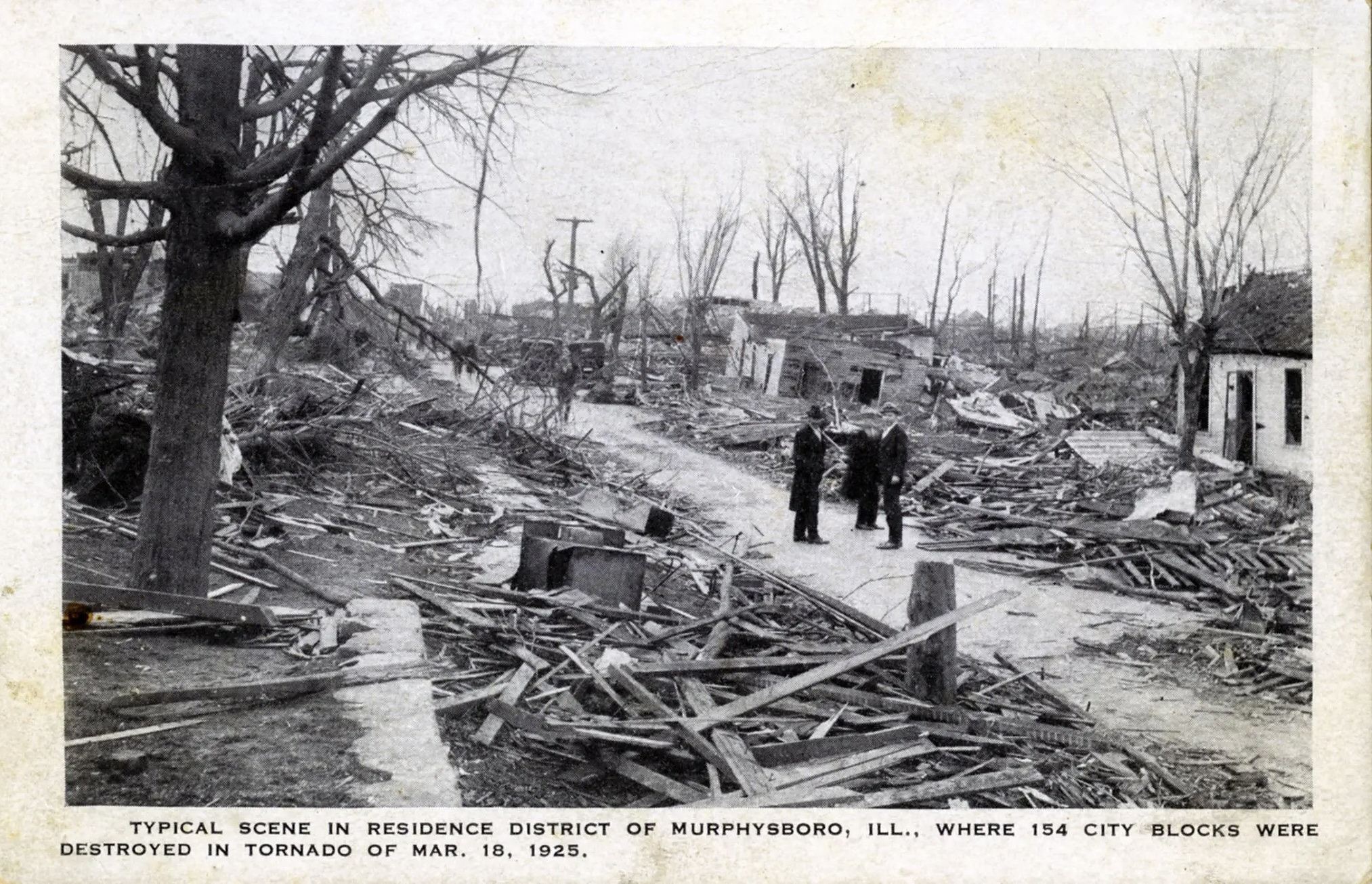
- A city block damaged by the Tri-State tornado in Murphysboro, Illinois

Meteorological history
- Formed: March 17, 1925
- Dissipated: March 19, 1925

Tornado outbreak
- Tornadoes: ≥12
- Max. rating: F5 tornado
- Duration: 7 hours
- Highest winds: >300 mph (480 km/h)

Overall effects
- Fatalities: 751 (800+ estimated)
- Injuries: > 2,298
- Damage: Over $17 million (1925 USD); at least $1.4 billion (1997 USD) $2.81 billion (2025 USD) (Note: All losses are in 1925 USD unless otherwise noted.)
- Areas affected: Midwestern and southeastern United States
- Part of the Tornadoes of 1925

From March 17–18, 1925, one of the deadliest tornado outbreaks in recorded history generated at least 12 significant tornadoes and spanned a large portion of the midwestern and southern United States. In all, at least 751 people died, including men, women, and children. 2,298 were injured, making the outbreak the deadliest tornado outbreak in U.S. history. The outbreak generated several destructive tornadoes in Missouri, Illinois, and Indiana on the same day, as well as significant tornadoes in Alabama and Kansas. In addition to confirmed tornadoes, there were undoubtedly others with lesser impacts, the occurrences of which have been lost to history.

The outbreak included the Tri-State Tornado, the deadliest disaster in Illinois, the deadliest tornado in U.S. history, and the second-deadliest registered in world history. The 219-mile-long (352 km) track left by the tornado, as it crossed from southeastern Missouri, through southern Illinois, and then into southwestern Indiana, is also the longest ever recorded. Modern meteorological re-analysis has suggested that the extremely long path length and lifespan reported in historical accounts are perhaps more plausibly attributed to multiple independent tornadoes belonging to a tornado family, rather than a single, continuous tornado. Although not officially rated by NOAA, the Tri-State Tornado is recognized by most experts (such as Tom Grazulis and Ted Fujita) as an F5 tornado, the maximum damage rating issued on the Fujita scale. (Note: An outbreak is generally defined as a group of at least six tornadoes (the number sometimes varies slightly according to local climatology) with no more than a six-hour gap between individual tornadoes. An outbreak sequence, prior to (after) the start of modern records in 1950, is defined as a period of no more than two (one) consecutive days without at least one significant (F2 or stronger) tornado.) (Note: The Fujita scale was devised under the aegis of scientist T. Theodore Fujita in the early 1970s. Prior to the advent of the scale in 1971, tornadoes in the United States were officially unrated. While the Fujita scale has been superseded by the Enhanced Fujita scale in the U.S. since February 1, 2007, Canada used the old scale until April 1, 2013; nations elsewhere, like the United Kingdom, apply other classifications such as the TORRO scale.) (Note: Historically, the number of tornadoes globally and in the United States was and is likely underrepresented: research by Grazulis on annual tornado activity suggests that, as of 2001, only 53% of yearly U.S. tornadoes were officially recorded. Documentation of tornadoes outside the United States was historically less exhaustive, owing to the lack of monitors in many nations and, in some cases, to internal political controls on public information. Most countries only recorded tornadoes that produced severe damage or loss of life. Significant low biases in U.S. tornado counts likely occurred through the early 1990s, when advanced NEXRAD was first installed and the National Weather Service began comprehensively verifying tornado occurrences.)

== Background ==
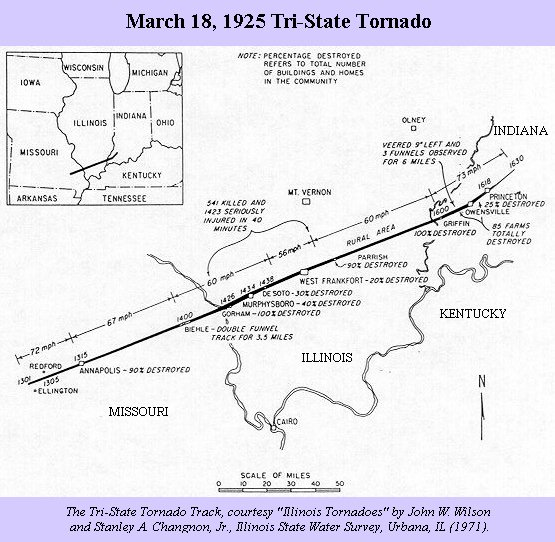
Track of the Tri-State tornado

During a six-year review study of the Tri-State tornado published in 2013, new surface and upper air data was obtained and meteorological reanalysis was utilized, adding significantly to knowledge of the synoptic and even mesoscale background of the event. The late winter to early spring of 1925 was warmer and drier than normal over much of the central United States. There apparently was persistent ridging in the western U.S. with a troughing pattern over the central U.S.

The extratropical cyclone that set the synoptic stage for the outbreak was centered over northwestern Montana at 7:00 a.m. CST (13:00 UTC) on March 17. Meanwhile, a diffuse area of surface low pressure was centered near Denver, Colorado, in association with a lee trough. Occluded fronts extended from Hudson Bay southwestward into the northern Plains states and into the lee trough. The synoptic cyclone moved south-southeastward across the mountain states to eastern Colorado. A warm front stretched along the Gulf Coast, separating warm, moist air from cool, showery weather with areas of fog that extended from Texas to the Carolinas. A well-mixed early-season continental tropical (cT) air mass existed over West Texas and northern New Mexico. To the east of this hot, dry air, buoyant maritime tropical (mT) air was advecting from the Gulf of Mexico. Simultaneously, a mid- to upper-level shortwave trough likely approached the northwest coast of the U.S. and moved rapidly through the persistent ridge then digging southeastward across the Great Basin and central Rocky Mountains and emerging in the Plains over Colorado. This initiated a "Colorado low" cyclogenesis.

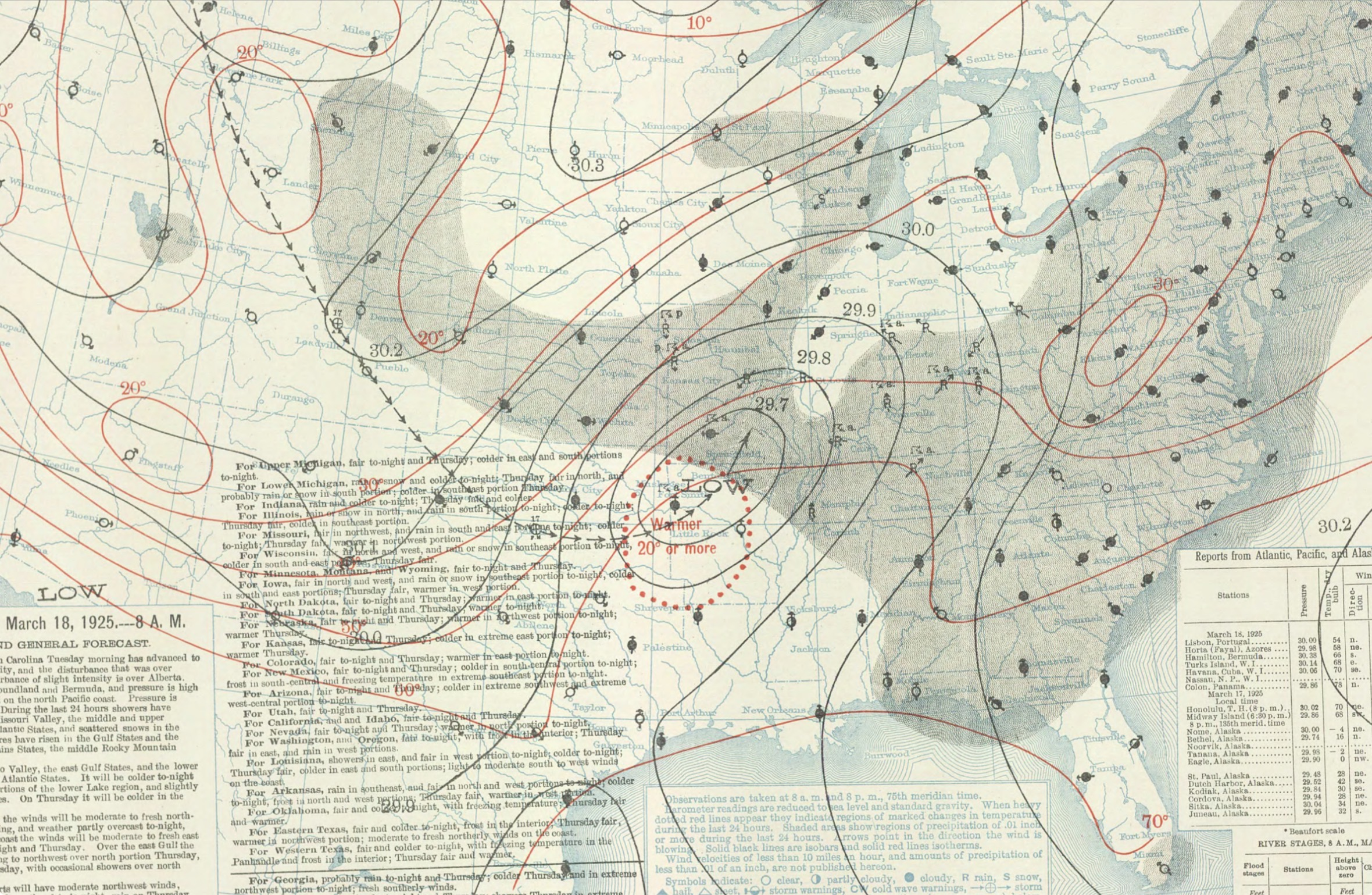
Surface weather analysis on March 18, showing the low-pressure area at the time of the tornado outbreak

At 7:00 a.m. CST on March 18, the surface low-pressure area, at approximately 1,003 hPa (29.6 inHg), moved to far northeastern Oklahoma while the warm front shot north into the circulation where the front then extended eastward. A maritime Polar (mP) cold front draped southwestward across eastern Texas with a dry line forming directly to the south of the low. The open shortwave, likely somewhat negatively tilted, was continuing to approach from the northwest and an apparent outflow boundary moved just to the south of the warm front over northeastern Arkansas and northwestern Tennessee. Several weak pressure troughs were traversing the cool sector over the north-central U.S.. Surface temperatures in the warm sector near the dry line and warm front ranged from 60–70 °F (16–21 °C), and the dew point was 55–65 °F (13–18 °C), with higher values farther south and increasing over time as the deepening low-pressure area continued to pull up air from the Gulf of Mexico. https://www.weather.gov/pah/1925Tornado_wi#:~:text=In This resulted in unstable air and lower cloud bases, or low LCL heights, which is favorable to tornadogenesis. From southeastern Kansas to Kentucky and Indiana, early morning showers and thunderstorms north of the low and warm front cooled and stabilized that air, retarding northward advancement of the front, and led to a sharp contrast in temperature from north to south. Such baroclinic zones are also associated with tornadic storms. Ahead of the surface dry line, which are uncommon as far east as the Mississippi River, an apparent "dry punch" of air aloft served to further increase instability. Concurrently, a capping inversion likely suppressed storms throughout the warm sector, leaving the Tri-State supercell undisturbed by nearby convection.

By 12:00 p.m. CST (18:00 UTC), the deepening surface low was centered over south-central Missouri, the shortwave axis was moving easterly and oriented over eastern Oklahoma, and the dry line was rapidly advancing eastward directly south of the low as the warm front, situated due east of the low, slowly shifted northward. Morning clouds cleared by midday across much of the Tri-State tornado's eventual path. A pronounced pressure trough extended northeast of the low and signaled its future track as a prefrontal trough formed southeast of the low ahead of the dry line. A bulge in the dry line may also have been forming slightly south of the low, and southerly to southeasterly surface winds were backing and increasing with time throughout the warm sector. The Tri-State supercell formed in a highly favorable area just ahead of the triple point where the cold front, warm front, and dry line met. The supercell initiated very near the surface low and moved east-northeastward, faster than the low, such that the storm gradually deviated east of the low's track. The supercell remained near this "sweet spot" for a prolonged period as it also traveled near the highly baroclinic warm front (likely just across the cool side of the boundary) for several hours.

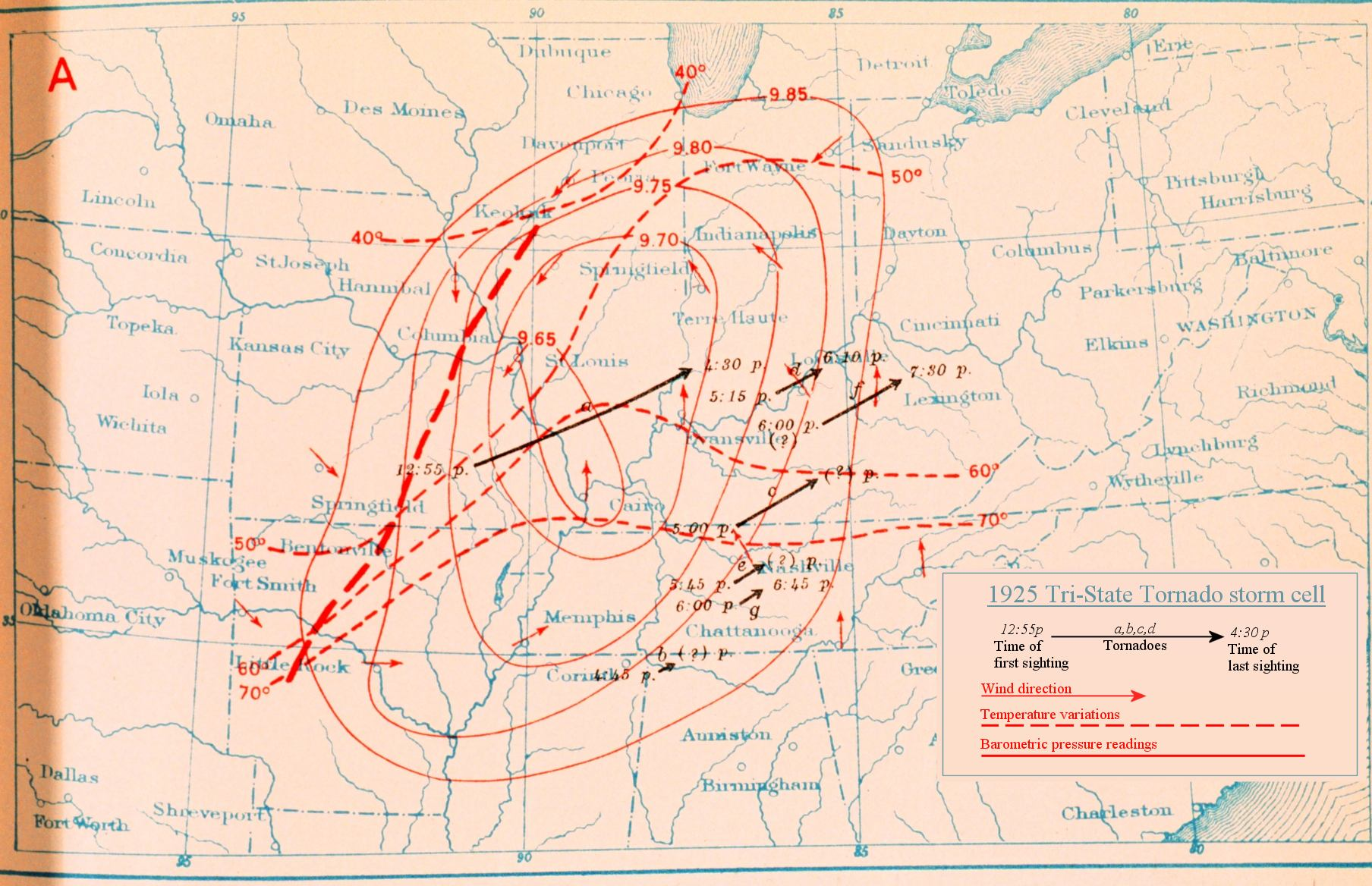
Tri-State tornado storm track and other tornadoes that day from Monthly Weather Review, April 1925. The information about the temperature, pressure, and other tornadoes may not be accurate

By 2:00 p.m. CST (20:00 UTC), the low was centered slightly south-southwest of St. Louis, Missouri, as the Tri-State supercell neared the Mississippi River. Other storms in the warm sector, removed from the Tri-State supercell, were initiating around 3:00 p.m. CST (21:00 UTC). Around 4:00 p.m. CST (22:00 UTC), the low's central pressure lowered to around 998 hPa (29.5 inHg), centered over south-central Illinois, as the supercell was moving into Indiana. This pressure is not particularly low compared to many other outbreak setups, but the pressure gradient was strong, which induced strong gradient winds and significant advection in the warm sector. A very strong low level jet was also in place just above the surface as winds veered with height, resulting in low-level curvature and long hodographs. Strong wind shear thus existed, with pronounced directional shear likely in the vicinity of the warm front, with winds at the 700 hPa height level west-southwesterly around 70 mph (110 km/h) and winds at the 500 hPa level about 90–110 mph (140–180 km/h). Theoretical hodographs returned estimated storm relative environmental helicity (SREH) values of 340 m^{2} s^{−2} in the vicinity of the Tri-State supercell track. Strong thunderstorms were now scattered throughout the warm sector and a line of severe thunderstorms was occurring near the dry line. The Tri-State supercell appeared to still be discrete and isolated, with a severe storm north of Cairo, Illinois, placed well to its south.

By 6:00 p.m. CST (00:00 UTC), the shortwave axis was over eastern Missouri and was lifting northeast. At 7:00 p.m. CST (01:00 UTC), the low was placed near Indianapolis, Indiana, with numerous thunderstorms east and south of the low and a squall line moving into the southeastern U.S. Cold air advection behind the strong cold front fed into the cyclone as snow and sleet fell from eastern Iowa to central Michigan. At 7:00 a.m. CST on March 19, the low was deepening and lifting rapidly northeastward into Canada.

== Confirmed tornadoes ==
These are estimated tornado ratings as tornado ratings in the United States were not official until 1950.

Confirmed tornadoes by Fujita rating
| FU | F0 | F1 | F2 | F3 | F4 | F5 | Total |
|---|---|---|---|---|---|---|---|
| ≥3 | ? | ? | 2 | 4 | 2 | 1 | ≥12 |

List of confirmed tornadoes in the Tri-State tornado outbreak (Note: All dates are based on the local time zone where the tornado touched down; however, all times are in Coordinated Universal Time and dates are split at midnight CST/CDT for consistency.) (Note: Prior to 1994, only the average widths of tornado paths were officially listed.)
| F# | Location | County / Parish | State | Time (UTC) | Path length | Max. width | Damage |
|---|---|---|---|---|---|---|---|
| F2 | Dearing | Montgomery | Kansas | 11:10–? | Unknown | Unknown | Unknown |
| F2 | This tornado wrecked a pair of barns and a filling station. Porches were torn loose from homes as well. | | | | | | |
| FU | Moore and Jackson Townships | Shannon | Missouri | 18:40–? | Unknown | Unknown | Unknown |
| FU | This tornado was likely a separate member of the Tri-State tornado family. | | | | | | |
| F5 | WNW of Ellington (MO) to Murphysboro (IL) to Oatsville (IN) | Reynolds (MO), Iron (MO), Madison (MO), Bollinger (MO), Perry (MO), Jackson (IL), Williamson (IL), Franklin (IL), Hamilton (IL), White (IL), Posey (IN), Gibson (IN), Pike (IN) | Missouri, Illinois, Indiana | 18:45–22:30 | 219 mi (352 km) | 2,650 yd (2,420 m) | $17,000,000 |
| F5 | 695 deaths – See article on this tornado – This is the deadliest and longest-tracked tornado in U.S. history. There were 588 fatalities in Illinois and 95 in Indiana, making this the deadliest tornado for both states. | | | | | | |
| F4 | Mauckport (IN) to S of Louisville (KY) | Harrison (IN), Jefferson (KY) | Indiana, Kentucky | 22:15–? | 18 mi (29 km) | 1,200 yd (1,100 m) | $150,000 |
| F4 | 4 deaths – A large, violent tornado impacted 27 farmsteads in Indiana, many of which were leveled; some entire farmsteads were obliterated, particularly near Laconia and Elizabeth, Indiana. The tornado leveled a two-block-wide swath next to the Ohio River, in what is now Pleasure Ridge Park. A multi-story brick home was obliterated in Lakeland. 60 people were injured. | | | | | | |
| F2 | Northwestern Littleville | Colbert | Alabama | 22:42–? | 12 mi (19 km) | 60 yd (55 m) | $15,000 |
| F2 | 1 death – This tornado destroyed a store, a filling station, and a pair of homes. 12 people were injured. | | | | | | |
| F4+ | Buck Lodge (TN) to Westmoreland (TN) to Beaumont (KY) | Sumner (TN), Macon (TN), Allen (KY), Barren (KY), Monroe (KY), Metcalfe (KY) | Tennessee, Kentucky | 23:00–? | 60 mi (97 km) | 400 yd (370 m) | >$300,000 |
| F4+ | 41 deaths – An exceptionally violent tornado family began north of Gallatin, Tennessee. Homes and churches were leveled in many communities, and several were swept away. At least 29 deaths occurred in Tennessee, eight of them in a single family, and 50 others were injured. This tornado may have reached F5 intensity at one or more points, and is considered one of the most powerful tornadoes in Middle Tennessee on record. Bodies were found dismembered hundreds of yards from homesites, and ground scouring occurred along the path. Despite crossing rugged terrain, the tornado remained as violent on hillsides as in valleys, leveling entire forests. In Kentucky, the tornado killed four people near Holland and eight more near Beaumont. In all, 95 injuries occurred along the entire path. | | | | | | |
| F3 | Eastern Louisville to Pewee Valley | Jefferson, Oldham | Kentucky | 23:00–? | 10 mi (16 km) | Unknown | Unknown |
| F3 | 3+ deaths – This tornado likely developed from the same storm as the Mauckport–Louisville F4. At least 12 homes were destroyed, three of which were multi-story, including a three-story brick home. Other structures and barns were unroofed or destroyed as well. 40 people were injured. The death toll may have exceeded three. | | | | | | |
| F3 | Western Marion County to Lexington | Marion, Washington, Mercer, Jessamine, Fayette, Bourbon | Kentucky | 23:30–? | 60 mi (97 km) | 300 yd (270 m) | Unknown |
| F3 | 2 deaths – A probable tornado family passed near Springfield. Many structures were destroyed in Washington County, including an entire all-black neighborhood in Jimtown. Rural farmhouses and barns were demolished as well, including at least one large, multi-story home. Damage may have reached F4-level intensity at one or more points along the path. 40 people were injured. | | | | | | |
| F3 | W of College Grove to Kirkland | Williamson, Rutherford | Tennessee | 23:45–? | 20 mi (32 km) | 200 yd (180 m) | $30,000 |
| F3 | 1 death – A significant tornado caused major damage to homes in Kirkland, a large one of which incurred F3-level damage. 30 barns and eight small homes were destroyed or damaged as well. At some spots all vegetation was reportedly swept away. Nine people were injured. | | | | | | |
| FU | Monroe Township to Vernon Township | Washington, Jackson | Indiana | 23:46–? | 20 mi (32 km) | Unknown | Unknown |
| FU | This large tornado was likely a continuation of the Tri-State tornado family. It caused significant damage to homes and a church across rural locales, including some homes that were flattened. Several people were injured. | | | | | | |
| F3 | Unionville to NE of Fosterville | Bedford, Rutherford | Tennessee | 00:10–? | 12 mi (19 km) | 300 yd (270 m) | Unknown |
| F3 | 4 deaths – At least 10 homes were destroyed, and 15 people were injured. | | | | | | |
| FU | S of Petersburg | Pike | Indiana | Unknown | Unknown | Unknown | Unknown |
| FU | This tornado was likely a separate member of the Tri-State tornado family. | | | | | | |

=== "Tri-State" (Missouri–Illinois–Indiana) ===
"Tri-State" (Missouri–Illinois–Indiana)
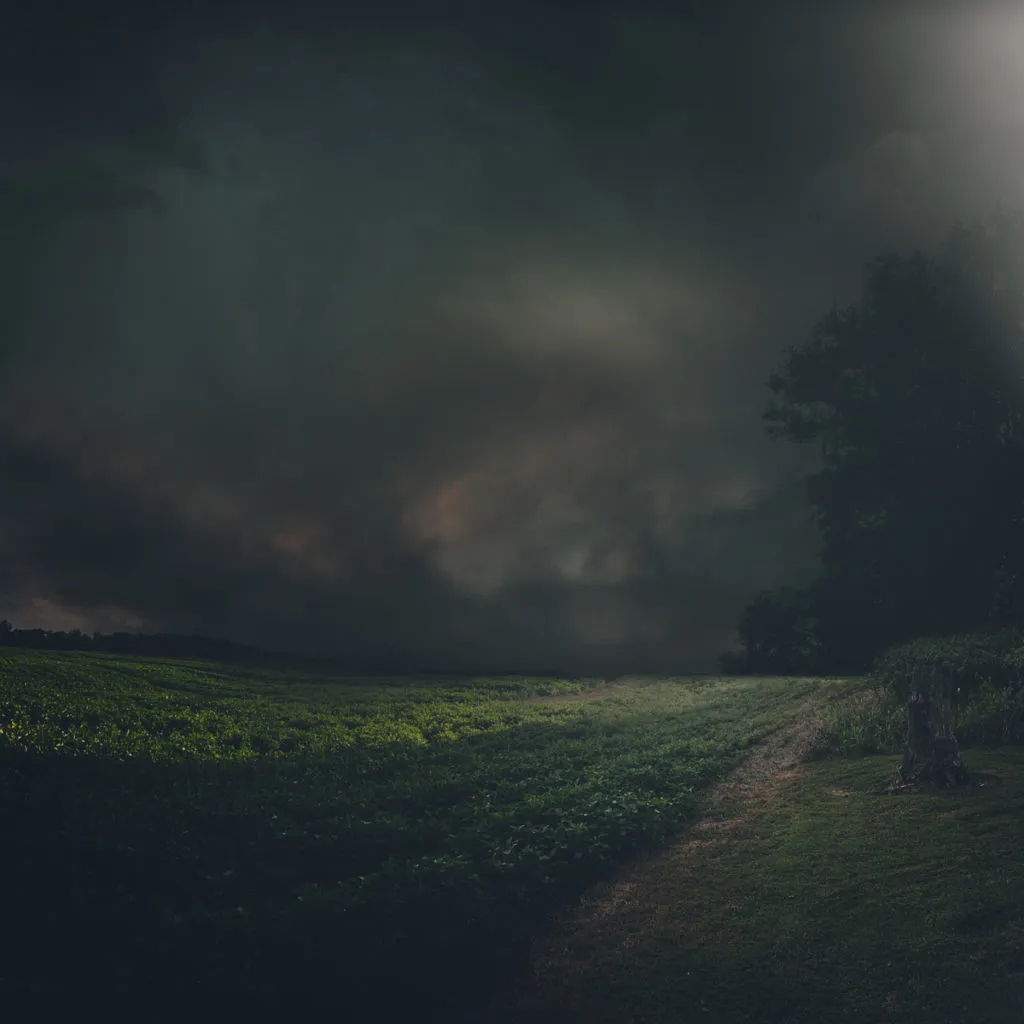
- An art reconstruction of the tornado approaching Newman School, Illinois.

Meteorological history
- Formed: March 18, 1925; 12:45 p.m. CST (UTC−06:00); Reynolds County, Missouri
- Dissipated: March 18, 1925; 4:30 p.m. CST (UTC−06:00); Pike County, Indiana
- Duration: 3 hours, 45 minutes

F5 tornado
- on the Fujita scale

Overall effects
- Casualties: 695 fatalities, 2027 injuries

This extremely long tracked, deadly, and catastrophic tornado touched down around 1.00 pm in Shannon County, Missouri, moving to the northeast. The tornado immediately began to produce heavy damage to structures before directly impacting Annapolis, destroying ninety percent of the town and killing two people. The tornado then moved through Bollinger County, where it would hit two schools and injure several children who were taking shelter. Deep ground scouring was observed as the tornado moved past Sedgewickville, and debris from the town was found almost 50 mi (80 km) away. It would hit several other small communities, including Brazeau and Frohna, before crossing state lines into Southern Illinois and directly impacting Gorham. Over half of the town's population was killed, and the town was devastated as the tornado moved by. To the northeast, it would hit the northern portions of Murphysboro, where over one hundred residents would die as the tornado barelled through the town at an estimated forward speed of 62 mph (100 km/h). (Note: This is not "average forward speed", but the speed the tornado moved at through the town.)

Further east, the tornado crossed into Franklin County, narrowly missing the towns of Royalton and Zeigler, devastating rural areas before heading towards the large mining town of West Frankfort. The tornado struck the northwest side of town, where in a manner similar to what was seen at Murphysboro, a number of densely populated neighborhoods, businesses and mining operations fell victim to the tornado. At the Peabody Mine 18 in Caldwell, a large 80-foot coal tipple weighing several hundred tons was blown over and rolled by the tornado. The tornado proceeded to devastate additional rural areas across Hamilton and White counties, between the two counties claiming 45 lives and injuring 140, 20 of whom later died, where it dissipated over three hours after touching down.

The tornado killed at least twenty farm owners in southeastern Illinois and southwestern Indiana, more than the combined total of the next four deadliest tornadoes in the history of the United States. The tornado killed 695 people, making it the deadliest tornado in American history, the majority of which occurred in Illinois. Despite not being officially rated, it is widely accepted to have been equivalent to an F5 on the Fujita scale, with winds up to 300 mph (480 km/h). There has long been uncertainty as to whether the originally recognized reports of a 219-mile (352 km) path over 3.5 hours represent a single continuous tornado or multiple independently tracking tornadoes belonging to a tornado family. Because of the scarcity of verifiable meteorological data from the time of the event and the apparent absence of any record of a tornado having approached this path length and duration in the years since, doubts have been raised about the plausibility of the conclusion that a single tornado was responsible for them. To date no definitive conclusion has been reached and a complete understanding of what occurred remains unachieved.

== Non-tornadic effects ==
Strong thunderstorms were reported in a broad area that also included parts of Oklahoma, Michigan, Pennsylvania, West Virginia, and Ontario. Numerous reports of hail and straight-line winds were reported, with up to 4.5-inch-diameter (11 cm) hail recorded (by comparison, a softball is 3.5–3.8 in (8.9–9.7 cm) in diameter). What began in the early afternoon as discrete supercell thunderstorms eventually consolidated into a potent squall line. By all accounts it was a widespread outbreak with severe thunderstorms occurring as far east as Ohio, as far southwest as Louisiana, and as far southeast as Georgia.

== See also ==
- List of tornadoes and tornado outbreaks
  - List of North American tornadoes and tornado outbreaks
- List of tornado-related deaths at schools
- List of F5 and EF5 tornadoes
- Tornado outbreak sequence of December 18–20, 1957 – Produced another violent tornado that paralleled the Tri-State tornado in Illinois.
- Daulatpur–Saturia tornado – Deadliest tornado worldwide in recorded history that struck Manikganj District in Bangladesh on April 26, 1989.
- Tornado outbreak of December 10–11, 2021 – Another deadly tornado outbreak that contained the "Quad-State supercell", which was initially believed to have dropped a single tornado that tracked over 4 states, but was later found to have not done so.
- Tornado outbreak of March 13–16, 2025 – A tornado outbreak which affected many of the same areas in March 2025, just a few days shy of Tri-State's 100th anniversary.

== Sources ==
- Akin, Wallace E. (2002). The Forgotten Storm: The Great Tri-state Tornado of 1925. Guilford, Connecticut: Lyons Press. ISBN 1-58574-607-X.
- Brooks, Harold E. (April 2004). "On the Relationship of Tornado Path Length and Width to Intensity". Weather and Forecasting. 19 (2): 310–19. Bibcode:2004WtFor..19..310B. doi:10.1175/1520-0434(2004)019<0310:OTROTP>2.0.CO;2.
- Cook, A. R.; Schaefer, J. T. (August 2008). "The Relation of El Niño–Southern Oscillation (ENSO) to Winter Tornado Outbreaks". Monthly Weather Review. 136 (8): 3121–3137. Bibcode:2008MWRv..136.3121C. doi:10.1175/2007MWR2171.1.
- Doswell III, Charles A.; Burgess, D. W. (1988). "On Some Issues of United States Tornado Climatology". Mon. Wea. Rev. 116 (2): 495–501. Bibcode:1988MWRv..116..495D. doi:10.1175/1520-0493(1988)116<0495:OSIOUS>2.0.CO;2.
- Duell, Rebecca S.; Van Den Broeke, M. S. (2016). "Climatology, Synoptic Conditions, and Misanalyses of Mississippi River Valley Drylines". Mon. Wea. Rev. 144 (3): 927–43. Bibcode:2016MWRv..144..927D. doi:10.1175/MWR-D-15-0108.1.
- Felknor, Peter S. (1992). The Tri-State Tornado: The Story of America's Greatest Tornado Disaster. Ames, IA: Iowa State University Press. ISBN 0-8138-0623-2.
- Flora, Snowden D. (1953). Tornadoes of the United States. Norman, OK: University of Oklahoma Press. ISBN 978-0806102627.
- Fujita, T. Theodore (1973). "Tornadoes Around the World". Weatherwise. 26 (2): 56–83. Bibcode:1973Weawi..26b..56F. doi:10.1080/00431672.1973.9931633.
- Grazulis, Thomas P. (May 1984). Violent Tornado Climatography, 1880–1982. OSTI (Technical report). NUREG. Washington, D.C.: Nuclear Regulatory Commission. OSTI 7099491. CR-3670.
  - — (November 1990). Significant Tornadoes 1880–1989. Vol. 2. St. Johnsbury, Vermont: The Tornado Project of Environmental Films. ISBN 1-879362-02-3.
  - — (July 1993). Significant Tornadoes 1680–1991: A Chronology and Analysis of Events. St. Johnsbury, Vermont: The Tornado Project of Environmental Films. ISBN 1-879362-03-1.
  - — (2001a). The Tornado: Nature's Ultimate Windstorm. Norman: University of Oklahoma Press. ISBN 978-0-8061-3538-0.
  - — (2001b). F5-F6 Tornadoes. St. Johnsbury, Vermont: The Tornado Project of Environmental Films.
- Johns, Bob (2012). The 1925 Tri-State Tornado's Devastation In Franklin County, Hamilton County, And White County, Illinois. Bloomington, IN: AuthorHouse. ISBN 978-1468560961.
  - —; Burgess, D. W.; Doswell III, C. A.; Gilmore, M. S.; et al. (2013). "The 1925 Tri-State Tornado Damage Path and Associated Storm System". e-Journal of Severe Storms Meteorology. 8 (2): 1–33. doi:10.55599/ejssm.v8i2.47.
- Maddox, Robert A.; Gilmore, M. S.; Doswell III, C. A.; Johns, R. H.; et al. (2013). "Meteorological Analyses of the Tri-State Tornado Event of March 1925". e-Journal of Severe Storms Meteorology. 8 (1): 1–27. doi:10.55599/ejssm.v8i1.46.
- Mason, Angela (2011). Death Rides the Sky: The Story of the 1925 Tri-State Tornado. Rockford, IL: Black Oak Media. ISBN 978-1-61876-001-2.
- Partlow, Geoff (2014). America's Deadliest Twister: The Tri-State Tornado of 1925. Carbondale, IL: Southern Illinois University Press. ISBN 9780809333462.

| Preceded by Lorain–Sandusky, OH (1924) | Costliest U.S. tornadoes on Record; March 18, 1925 | Succeeded by St. Louis, MO–East St. Louis, IL (1927) |
