= 1925 Tri-State tornado =

1925 tornado in Missouri, Illinois and Indiana, U.S.

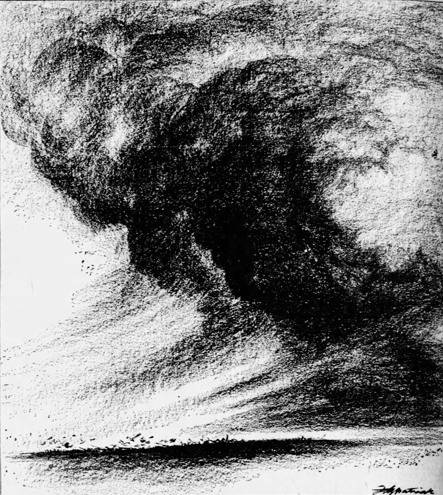
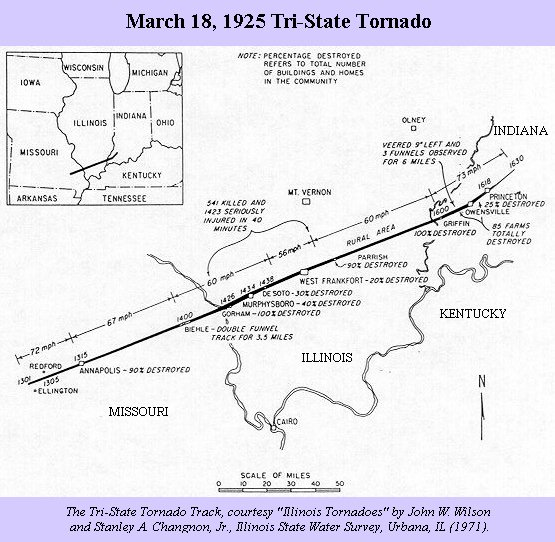
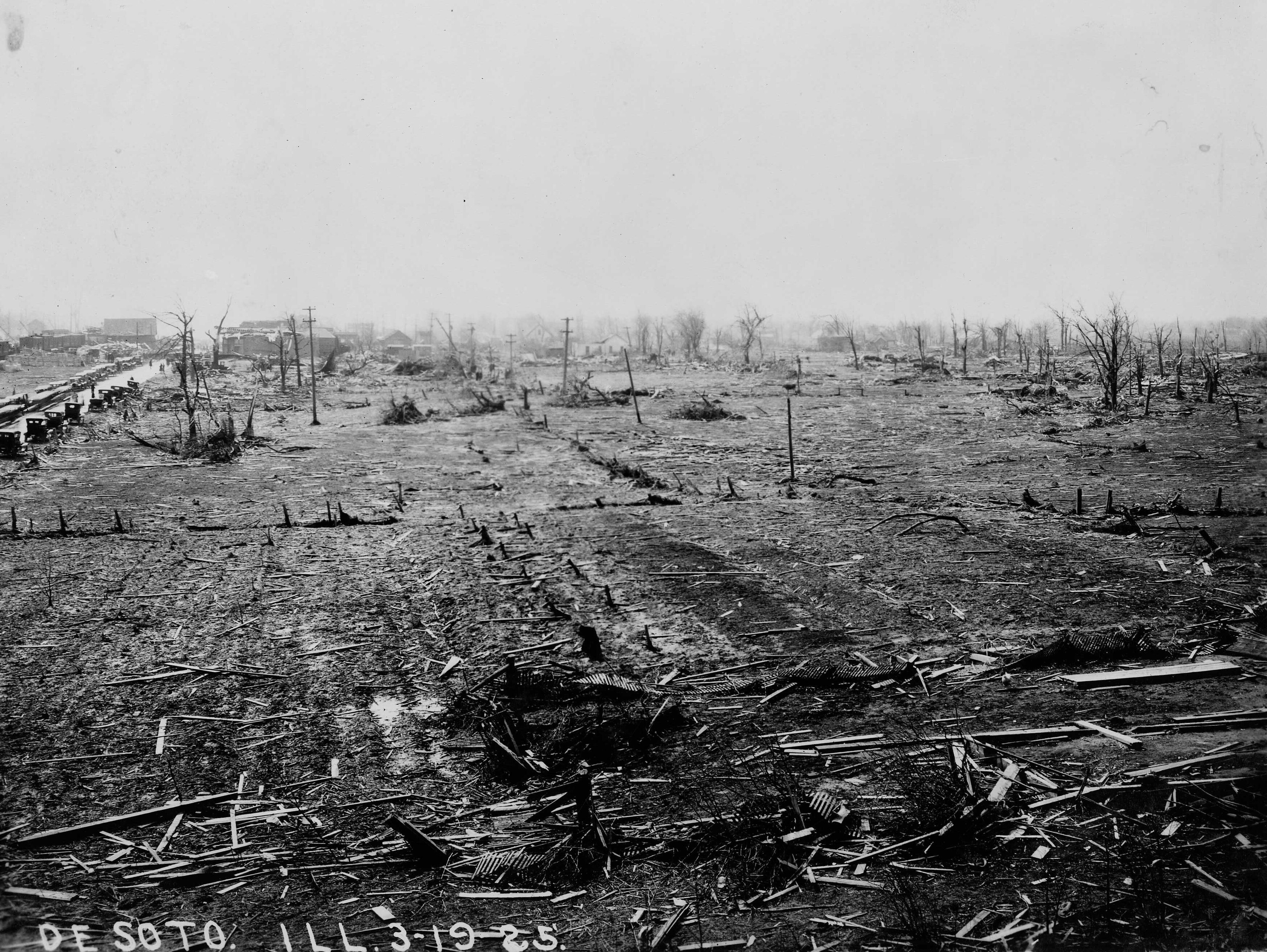
- Counterclockwise from top: Eyewitness drawing of the Tri State Tornado; Track of the Tri-State tornado; Extreme damage in De Soto, Illinois

Meteorological history
- Formed: March 18, 1925; 12:45 p.m. CST (UTC−06:00); Reynolds County, Missouri
- Dissipated: March 18, 1925; 4:30 p.m. CST (UTC−06:00); Pike County, Indiana
- Duration: 3 hours, 45 minutes

F5-equivalent tornado
- Max width: 2,650–3,540 yd (1.51–2.01 mi; 2.42–3.24 km)
- Path length: 219 miles (352 km) (disputed; see validity of track length)
- Highest winds: >300 mph (480 km/h)

Overall effects
- Fatalities: 695 (Note: (Root 1926, Changnon et al 1971, current accepted figure is 695). 689 (originally listed by the Weather Bureau). Actual number likely greater than either figure. The Weather Bureau page from Barron lists 742 dead.)
- Injuries: 2,027–2,756
- Damage: $16.55 million (1925 USD); $2.9 billion (2024 USD) (3rd-costliest in U.S. history)
- Areas affected: Southern Missouri, Illinois, Indiana
- Part of the Tornado outbreak of March 17–18, 1925 and Tornadoes of 1925

In the midday and afternoon hours of Wednesday, March 18, 1925, the deadliest tornado in United States history and second-deadliest worldwide moved through Eastern Missouri, Southern Illinois and Southern Indiana, killing 695 people and injuring 2,027 more in what is sometimes known as the Tri-State tornado. The tornado touched down as part of a larger severe weather outbreak that hit the United States on the same day, and produced catastrophic damage across numerous villages and towns in all three states. Despite not being officially rated, it is widely accepted to have been equivalent to an F5 on the Fujita scale.

The tornado touched down in Shannon County, Missouri, moving to the northeast. The tornado immediately began to produce heavy damage to structures before directly impacting Annapolis, destroying ninety percent of the town and killing two people. The tornado then moved through Bollinger County, where it hit two schools and injured several children who were taking shelter. Deep ground scouring was observed as the tornado moved past Sedgewickville, and debris from the town was found almost 50 mi (80 km) away. It hit several other small communities, including Brazeau and Frohna, before crossing state lines into Southern Illinois and directly impacting Gorham, in which over half of the town's population was killed. To the northeast, it would hit the northern portions of Murphysboro, where 234 residents would die as the tornado barreled through the town at an estimated forward speed of 62 mph (100 km/h). (Note: This is not "average forward speed", but the speed the tornado moved at through the town.)

Further east, the tornado crossed into Franklin County, narrowly missing the towns of Royalton and Zeigler but devastating rural areas before heading towards the large mining town of West Frankfort. The tornado struck the northwest side of town, where in a manner similar to what was seen at Murphysboro, a number of densely populated neighborhoods, businesses and mining operations fell victim to the tornado. At the Peabody Mine 18 in Caldwell, a large 80-foot coal tipple weighing several hundred tons was blown over and rolled by the tornado. The tornado proceeded to devastate additional rural areas across Hamilton and White counties, between the two counties claiming 45 lives and injuring 140, 20 of whom later died. The tornado then crossed the Wabash River into Gibson County, Indiana. The town of Griffin was completely destroyed and the large town of Princeton ravaged before the storm passed into Pike County, where it finally dissipated, over three hours after touching down.

The tornado killed at least twenty farm owners in southeastern Illinois and southwestern Indiana, more than the combined total of the next four deadliest tornadoes in the recorded history of the United States. The tornado killed a combined total of 695 people, the majority of which occurred in Illinois.

== Meteorological synopsis ==
The extratropical cyclone that set the synoptic stage for the outbreak was centered over northwestern Montana at 7:00 a.m. CST (13:00 UTC) on March 17. Meanwhile, a diffuse area of surface low pressure was centered near Denver, Colorado, in association with a lee trough. Occluded fronts extended from Hudson Bay southwestward into the northern Plains states and into the lee trough. The synoptic cyclone moved south-southeastward across the mountain states to eastern Colorado. A warm front stretched along the Gulf Coast, separating warm, moist air from cool, showery weather with areas of fog that extended from Texas to the Carolinas. A well-mixed early-season continental tropical (cT) air mass existed over West Texas and northern New Mexico. To the east, hot, dry, buoyant maritime tropical (mT) air was advecting from the Gulf of Mexico. Simultaneously, a mid- to upper-level shortwave trough likely approached the northwest coast of the U.S. and moved rapidly through the persistent ridge then digging southeastward across the Great Basin and central Rocky Mountains and emerging in the Plains over Colorado. This initiated a Colorado low cyclogenesis.

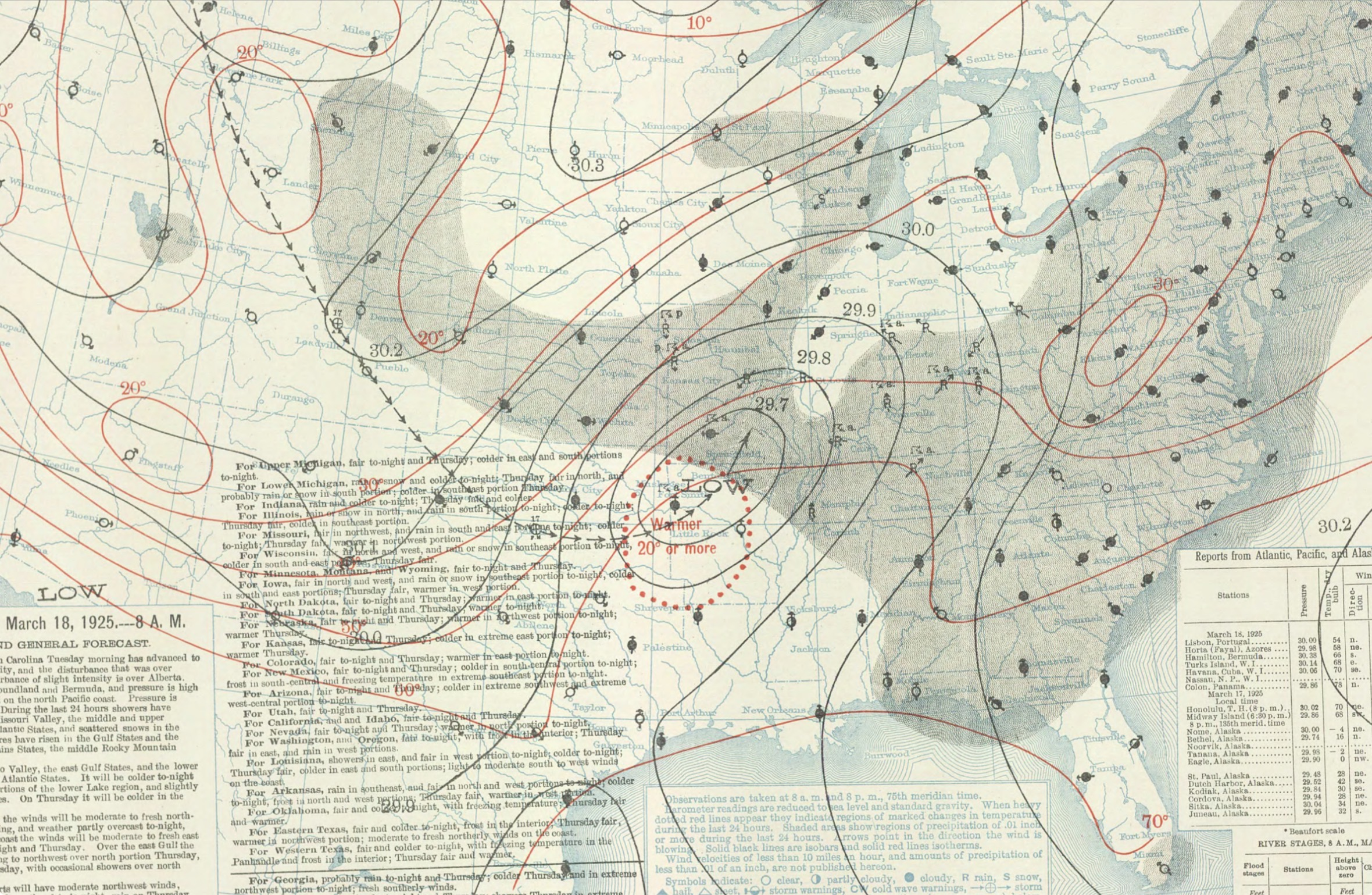
Surface weather map on March 18, showing the low-pressure area that would spawn the tornado

At 7:00 a.m. CST on March 18, the surface low-pressure area, at approximately 1,003 hPa (29.6 inHg), moved to far northeastern Oklahoma while the warm front shot north into the circulation where the front then extended eastward. A maritime Polar (mP) cold front draped southwestward across eastern Texas with a dry line forming directly to the south of the low. The open shortwave, likely somewhat negatively tilted, was continuing to approach from the northwest and an apparent outflow boundary moved just to the south of the warm front over northeastern Arkansas and northwestern Tennessee. Several weak pressure troughs were traversing the cool sector over the north-central U.S.. Surface temperatures in the warm sector near the dry line and warm front ranged from 60–70 °F (16–21 °C), and the dew point was 55–65 °F (13–18 °C), with higher values farther south and increasing over time as the deepening low-pressure area continued to pull up air from the Gulf of Mexico. This resulted in unstable air and lower cloud bases, or low LCL heights, which is favorable to tornadogenesis. From southeastern Kansas to Kentucky and Indiana, early morning showers and thunderstorms north of the low and warm front cooled and stabilized that air, retarding northward advancement of the front, and led to a sharp contrast in temperature from north to south. Such baroclinic zones are also associated with tornadic storms. Ahead of the surface dry line, which are uncommon as far east as the Mississippi River, an apparent "dry punch" of air aloft served to further increase instability. Concurrently, a capping inversion likely suppressed storms throughout the warm sector, leaving the Tri-State supercell undisturbed by nearby convection.

By 12:00 p.m. CST (18:00 UTC), the deepening surface low was centered over south-central Missouri, the shortwave axis was moving easterly and oriented over eastern Oklahoma, and the dry line was rapidly advancing eastward directly south of the low as the warm front, situated due east of the low, slowly shifted northward. Morning clouds cleared by midday across much of the Tri-State tornado's eventual path. A pronounced pressure trough extended northeast of the low and signaled its future track as a prefrontal trough formed southeast of the low ahead of the dry line. A bulge in the dry line may also have been forming slightly south of the low, and southerly to southeasterly surface winds were backing and increasing with time throughout the warm sector. The tri-state supercell formed in a highly favorable area just ahead of the triple point where the cold front, warm front, and dry line met. The supercell initiated very near the surface low and moved east-northeastward, faster than the low, such that the storm gradually deviated east of the low's track.

By 2:00 p.m. CST (20:00 UTC), the low was centered slightly south-southwest of St. Louis, Missouri, as the tri-state supercell neared the Mississippi River. Other storms in the warm sector, removed from the supercell, were initiating around 3:00 p.m. CST (21:00 UTC). Around 4:00 p.m. CST (22:00 UTC), the low's central pressure lowered to around 998 hPa (29.5 inHg), centered over south-central Illinois, as the supercell was moving into Indiana. This pressure is not particularly low compared to many other outbreak setups, but the pressure gradient was strong, which induced strong gradient winds and significant advection in the warm sector. A very strong low level jet was also in place just above the surface as winds veered with height, resulting in low-level curvature and long hodographs. Strong wind shear thus existed, with pronounced directional shear likely in the vicinity of the warm front, with winds at the 700 hPa height level west-southwesterly around 70 mph (110 km/h) and winds at the 500 hPa level about 90–110 mph (140–180 km/h). Theoretical hodographs returned estimated storm relative environmental helicity (SREH) values of 340 m^{2} s^{−2} in the vicinity of the tri-state supercell track. Strong thunderstorms were now scattered throughout the warm sector and a line of severe thunderstorms was occurring near the dry line. The supercell appeared to still be discrete and isolated, with a severe storm north of Cairo, Illinois, placed well to its south.

== Tornado summary ==
=== Shannon County, Missouri ===
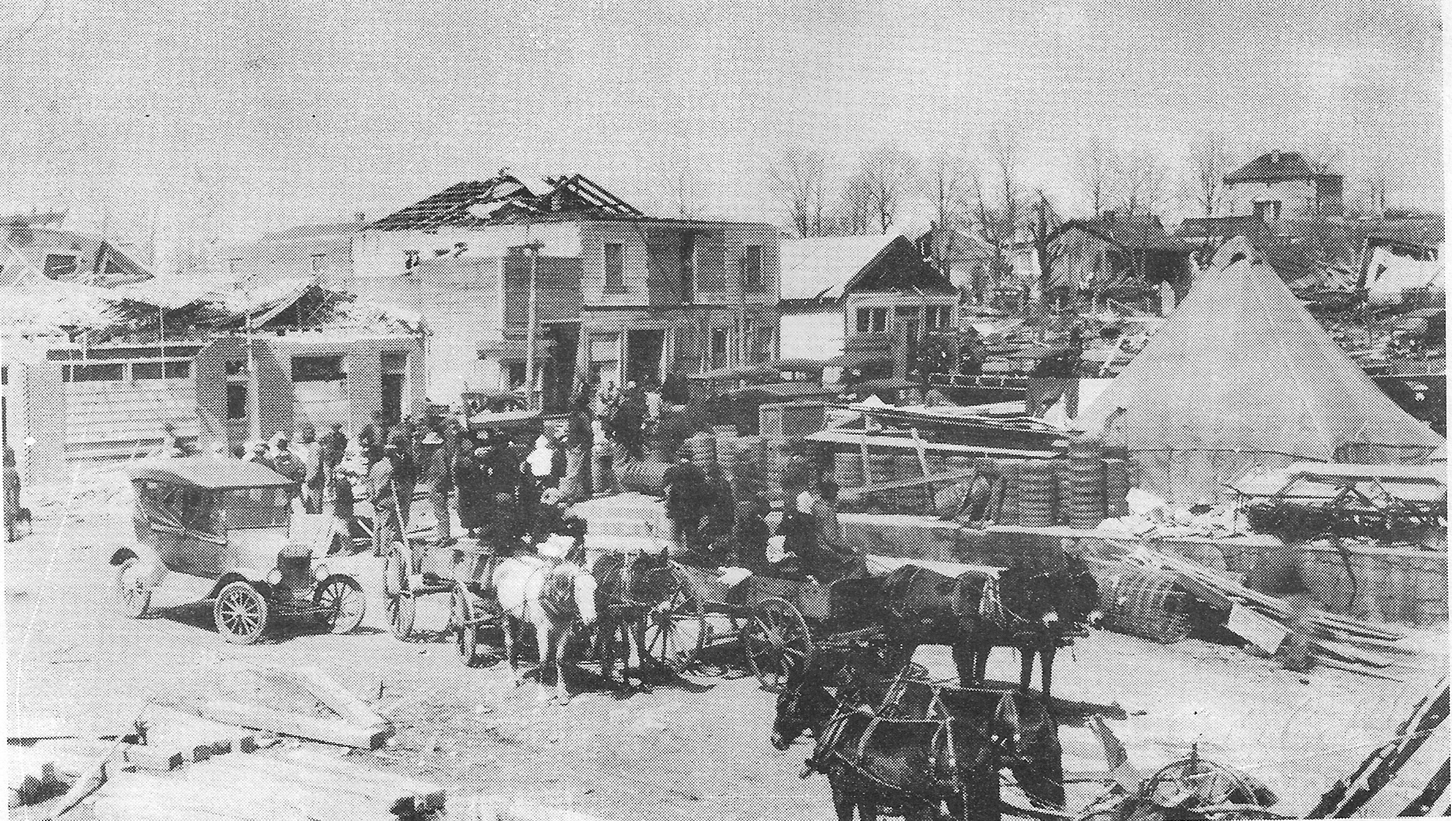
Damage in Annapolis

The tornado was first sighted as a highly visible and relatively small condensation funnel in the rugged forested hills of Moore Township, Shannon County, Missouri, at around 12:40 p.m. CST. The funnel was spotted by Helen Thompson as it moved north toward Ellington around five minutes later. The Scott Farm suffered damage in this area, and the tornado was sighted by at least one farmer as trees in the area were destroyed. Farmer Sam Flowers was the first fatality of the tornado, being killed around 1:00 p.m. CST (19:01 UTC) when he was struck by a falling tree.

Destruction in Annapolis after the tornado

The tornado continued to be spotted as it moved south of the Redford area, and timber damage was reported in the Upper Low Hollow. Shortly before crossing into Iron County, a man cutting timber saw the tornado near the Black River. After entering Iron County, the tornado continued moving northeast, where a roar was audible as it moved near the Joseph Brown Farm. Three minutes later, the tornado directly impacted the mining town of Annapolis. On the northern side was the Annapolis School, where the tornado shattered windows and damaged doors. Downtown Annapolis was severely damaged; however, most of the business buildings and homes north of 2nd Street were not demolished. Closer to the railroad, there was complete destruction, and several freight cars were blown away off the tracks. At least 100 people were injured in downtown Annapolis and four were killed before the tornado moved on. An estimated 90% of the town was damaged.

=== Madison and Bollinger County, Missouri ===
One minute after moving over Annapolis, it hit the small mining village of Leadanna. Some 21 homes were completely swept away, and several dozen more were damaged or destroyed. The mining plant was seriously damaged, the crusher mill and power house were completely destroyed, and the offices and other structures at the plant, including the tipple tower were severely damaged, although the smoke stack was left intact. Up to 50 people were injured in town when the tornado struck a mine, and three were killed, with inflicted damage costs totaling an estimated $200,000 (1925 USD). The tornado then began causing a lot of damage over rural woodland, with large swaths of trees flattened north of the Collins School. It then crossed into the sparsely populated areas of Madison County south of Fredericktown, where the tornado steadily began to grow larger. Damage was inflicted to the Thomas Mills Farm north of Jewett, before the tornado moved south of the Cherokee Pass. In this area it damaged a home to the point where it was "torn from its foundation" and "tore down" several outbuildings on properties. A home on the Prichard Farm property was completely demolished, and a log house located east of the Castor River was destroyed, with several people suffering minor injuries. On the border of Madison County and Bollinger County, a property was "wrecked". After crossing into Bollinger County the tornado did significant damage to trees and rural farmhouses. On the Reva Henson Farm, the tornado sent a board flying through a hickory tree; everything on the property was destroyed. In this area, the tornado began producing ground scouring, with soil being torn up.

The nearby C.M. Fadler Farm was also completely destroyed, and portions of the J.H. Johnson Farm were destroyed, with the top of his home being blown off and his timber suffering greatly with "greater portions stripped off". At 1:57 p.m., the Conrad School was directly hit by the tornado, with its concrete foundation being snapped and 18 children being injured. One child died the next day. Several others may have died later. The tornado caused pieces of tin to be entwined in tree branches on the Herman Bangert Farm; the pieces of tin remained there for at least 70 years after the tornado. As the tornado neared Lixville, a church and farm buildings were destroyed. A well-built house, possibly constructed with concrete, was partly destroyed by the tornado. On the property a piece of straw became lodged in solid concrete. To the north, the tornado began scouring the ground a second time from a farmhouse to the Garner School. The school itself was completely swept away by the tornado, with only a concrete foundation remaining. One person was killed and 29 others were injured at this location. Four more people were injured at a farmhouse to the northeast; the foundation was all that remained. On the Louis Clements Farm, significant ground scouring occurred, and one person was killed. Deep ground scouring was observed near the town of Sedgewickville as well, and the tornado carried sheets of iron as far as 50 mi (80 km) away. At around 2:00 p.m. the tornado crossed into Perry County, almost immediately injuring people and impaling livestock on snapped trees. One minute later a home was completely destroyed, with one death and another injury occurring.

=== Perry County, Missouri ===
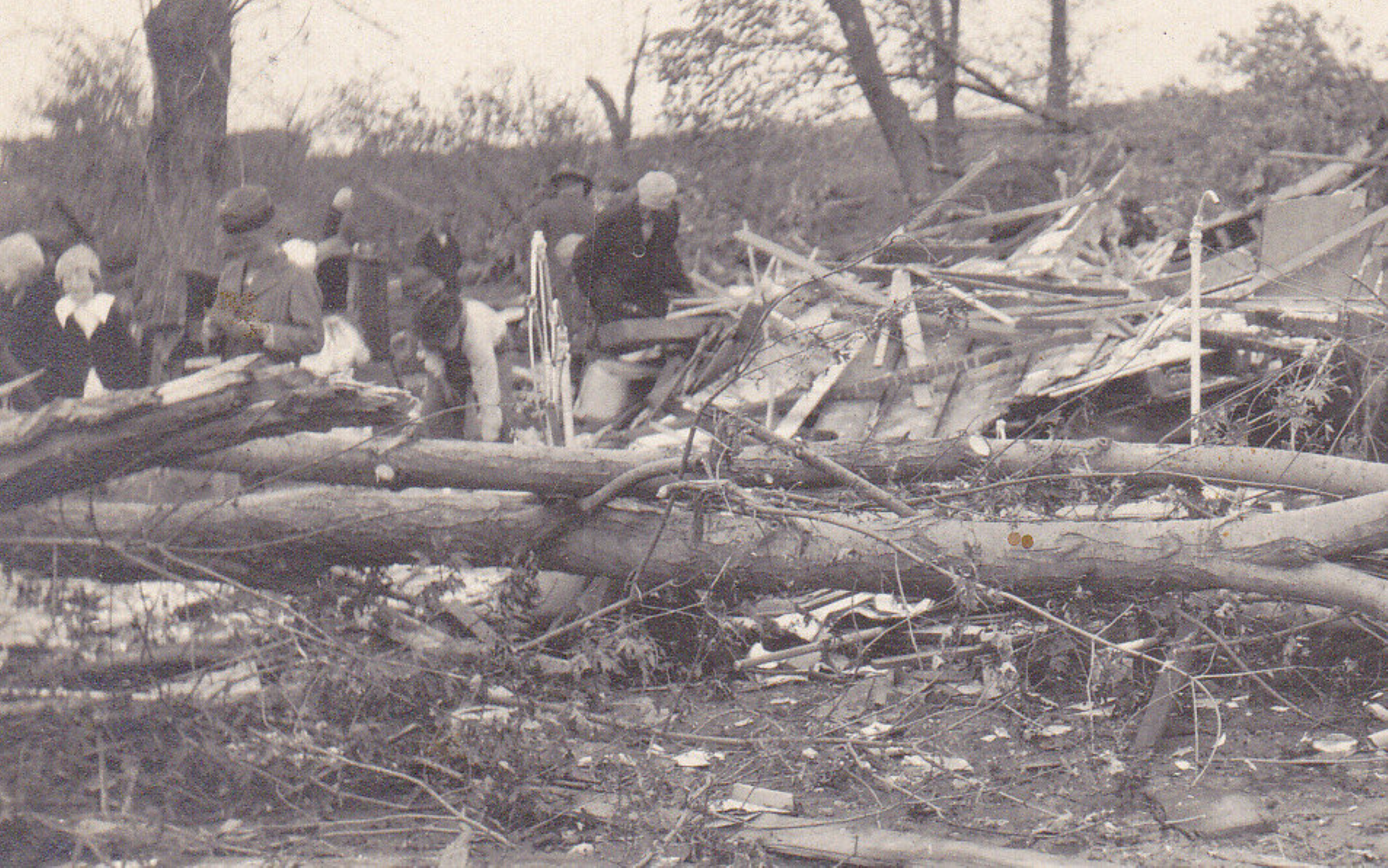
Debris from a home near Biehle; a resident was killed under the tree

The tornado reportedly developed a double funnel as it struck the town of Biehle, destroying many homes in and around the town and killing a farmer. In a 2013 publication, eyewitness testimonies obtained by researchers Charles Doswell III and Donald Burgess disputed the claim that a multiple-vortex structure was visible. The St. Mathus Catholic Church was damaged, with one minor injury occurring at the property. The nearby school was not badly damaged. Less than two miles west of Biehle, the community of Schumer Springs was severely affected. The local hotel was reported completely destroyed along with several neighbouring homes. A large wooded area over the ridge on Schumer Springs was also reportedly "swept clean" as the tornado "cleaved a path several hundred yards wide over the wooded hilltop, uprooting beeches, elms, and maples, and snapping the trunks of 14 inch and 20 inch oaks like twigs." At the farm of Andrew Braun between Schumer Springs and Biehle, the home and barn were blown away with the debris "thrown very far". A gang-disc plow was also reportedly "twisted almost beyond recognition", and "long lines of lathe and split-rail fences were shattered and thrown, in tangled heaps." The forests north of this farm were also reported to be "a mass of devastation" and several farm animals were thrown hundreds of yards, some were impaled or wrapped around debarked tree stubs. Ground scouring was also reported in the area.

To the east near Apple Creek, the large home and barn of Joseph Blechle was destroyed and the debris was thrown 70 yards into the creek. Blechle was killed and his wife was severely injured. A young boy delivering mail who sheltered in their barn was injured. About half a mile north of central Biehle, the farm of Judge Henry Biehle was severely affected; the home was heavily damaged and two barns were destroyed. The John Gerringer Farm, located just to the east, was swept away; there was "no sign buildings had ever been there". Interestingly, a baby from the Gerringer Farm was found almost 1,200 yards to the northeast on the nearby Pingel farm, remarkably uninjured. A short distance east of present-day Interstate 55, a farm was destroyed, with debris from the property being thrown long distances. On the Joseph Buchheit Farm, a house and two barns were destroyed and farm machinery was thrown with "nothing left". Four people were injured by the tornado, including one seriously. Properties continued to be destroyed in rural Perry County, including numerous farms near the community of Brazeau. One farmer in the area was seriously injured and died four days later. Numerous other homes and farms were completely leveled near Frohna as well, where one woman was killed and another died from her injuries ten days later. Altogether, at least 12 people died and at least 200 others were injured in Missouri.

=== Jackson, Williamson, and Franklin County, Illinois ===
Destruction in Gorham after the tornado

The tornado then crossed the Mississippi River into southern Illinois, debarking trees and deeply scouring the ground in rural areas. The home of Martin Meisner was destroyed, and the John Rothjen Farm was also heavily damaged. A building was swept away at the Arthur Hines property as the tornado continued tracking towards the town of Gorham. At 2:30 p.m. CST (20:30 UTC), the town suffered a direct hit. All the store fronts, 60 of the 80 houses, the only church in town, and the top story of the school were destroyed with the remaining 20 houses being damaged. The post office and railroad depot were the only buildings on the main street not completely destroyed. Eighteen railroad cars were also demolished and a locomotive was destroyed. Railroad tracks were also reportedly ripped from the ground. More than half the town's population was injured or killed; 30 were killed in the immediate storm and 170 were injured, six of whom later died.

View of the damage in Murphysboro

Continuing to the northeast at an average speed of 62 mph (100 km/h) (and up to 73 mph (117 km/h)), the tornado cut a swath almost 1 mi (1.6 km) wide through the city of Murphysboro, a thriving coal shipping center and railroad town of 10,000. The tornado leveled all but the extreme southeastern side of town, where many densely populated working-class neighborhoods saw some of the storm's most horrific effects. Entire rows of homes were leveled and swept away in some areas. Trees were debarked, and vehicles were hurled several blocks. Many other structures were also damaged or destroyed throughout the town, including the M&O railroad shops, office, and roundhouse, where 35 people were killed, mostly in fires after the tornado.

Ruins of the Longfellow School in Murphysboro. The storm hit the school at about 2:30 PM local time.

Schools in the area were devastated as well, with 17 students killed at the Longfellow School and nine others killed at the Logan School. Three seniors were also killed in the original High School building when the top story blew away. After the tornado passed, large fires ignited and swept through the rubble, burning many of the trapped survivors alive. With the water mains destroyed, dynamite was used to try to stop the fires, but only caused more destruction. In all, 188 people died in the immediate storm at Murphysboro, including at least 20 who were never identified. The official number of injured was 623, while some other sources claim it could have been higher. Of those injured, 46 more later died, bringing the storm's death toll at Murphysboro to 234, to date being the highest exacted by a tornado of any single city in the United States.

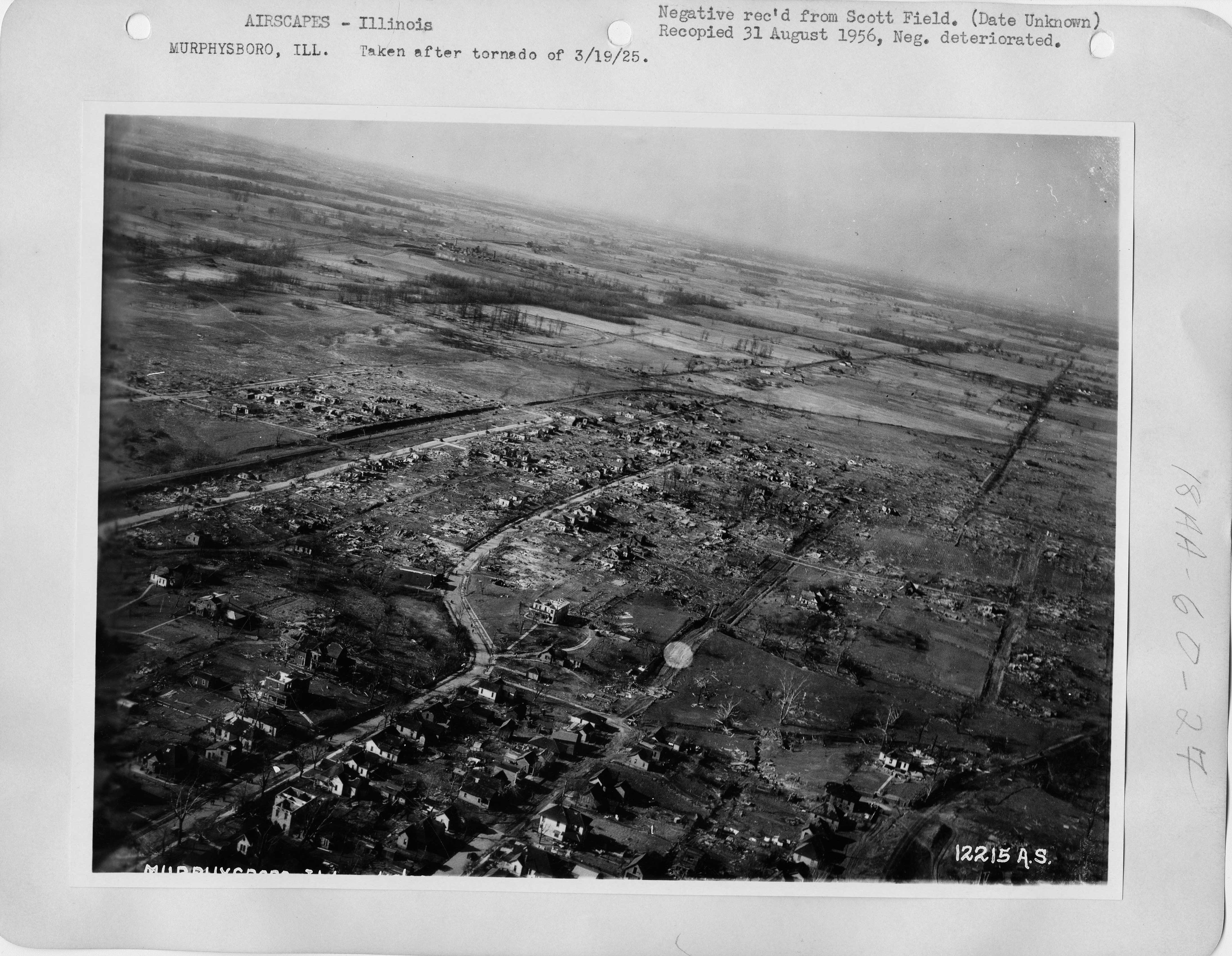
Aerial view of damage in Murphysboro

The tornado then devastated the rural farming area northeast of Murphysboro inflicting substantial losses to property and other farm objects. A large railroad bridge was blown away over the Big Muddy, and entire portions of forest were flattened. The tornado then struck the farming town of De Soto, which on a scale paralleling Gorham was virtually obliterated. In the immediate storm, 56 were killed and another 105 were injured, five of whom later died, as many homes were swept away. Thirty-three of the deaths were students that were killed in the partial collapse of the De Soto School, the worst tornadic death toll at a single school in U.S. history. Also killed at De Soto was Jackson County Deputy Sheriff George Boland. While on patrol when the storm struck, the tornado lifted him from the ground and he disappeared into the funnel. His body was never found. In a wooded area in northern De Soto, the tornado produced extreme ground scouring and tree damage, with a photo from the national archives showing a scene with some tree trunks just a couple feet tall.

After exiting De Soto, the tornado continued to devastate farms in rural Jackson County, demolishing several homes, barns, outbuildings and other farm implements. Another large iron bridge over the Big Muddy River connecting De Soto and Hurst was severely damaged and blown six feet off its foundation, and vast swaths of trees along the river were blown down in all directions. Three people were killed at the Beeson Farm in this area. The tornado then clipped the northwest corner of Williamson County, narrowly missing the town of Hurst and striking the small village of Bush. Several homes on the North Camp were leveled, and pieces of wood were speared into the town's water tower. Heavy railroad axles were reportedly lifted and scattered across the railyard, and the Missouri Pacific Roundhouse was partly demolished, along with accompanying railroad shops, injuring two workers. The tornado killed 10 people in Bush and the surrounding area, and injured another 37, four of whom later died. Further east, the tornado crossed into Franklin County, narrowly missing the towns of Royalton and Zeigler, devastating rural areas. A large iron bridge across the Big Muddy River on the Royalton-Colp Road was blown off of its pillars into the river, and a nearby swinging bridge was blown away. Several homes near the Royalton Water Plant in an area known as the "Hub Town" were unroofed.

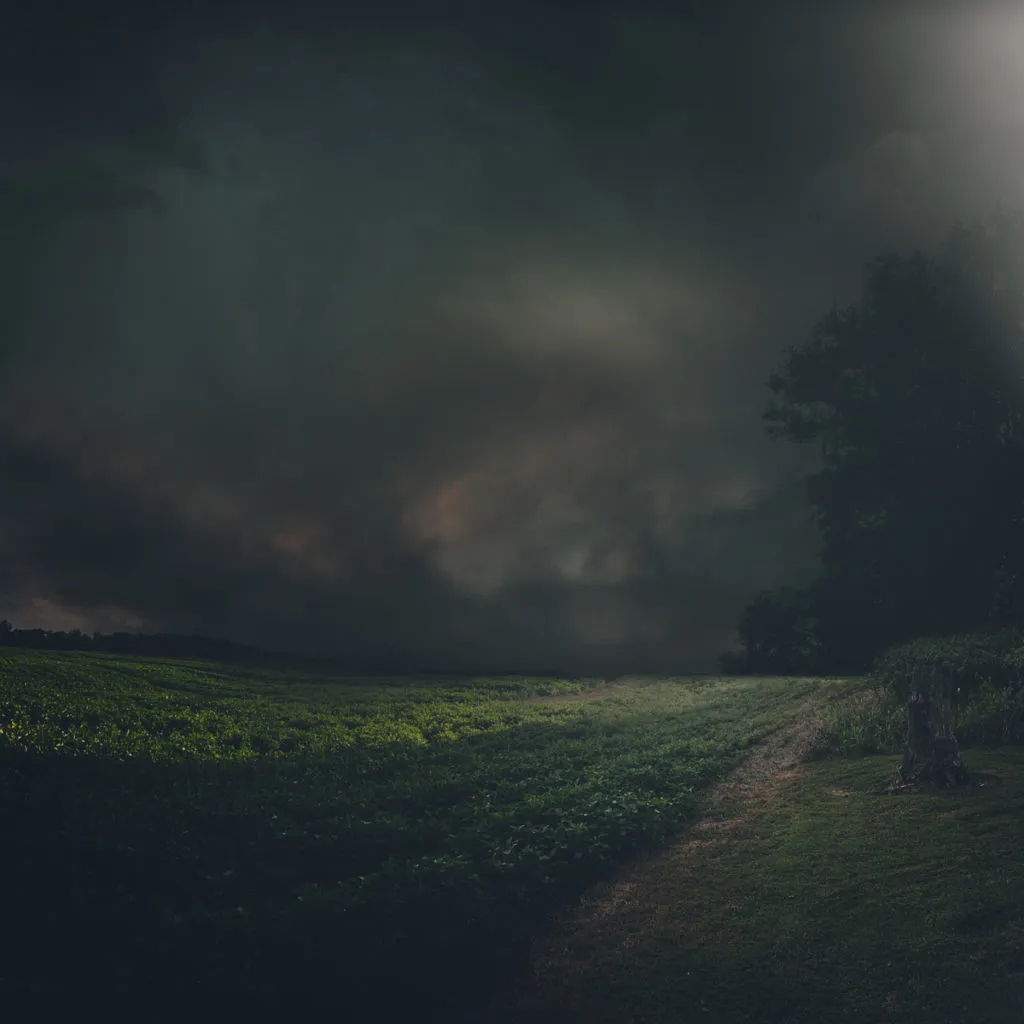
An artist's reconstruction of the Tri-State tornado as it was approaching Newman School in Illinois, several miles northwest of Carmi

Further to the southeast, the farm of John Chapman was completely leveled and his wife was killed. Further east, both of the two homes belonging to George Vancil were swept away and he was killed. To the south, the home of Charles Baker was blown off its foundation and to the north, the Sanders home was damaged. The tornado continued to traverse rural Franklin County, crossing the Big Muddy several times in an area where few people lived. However, severe destruction occurred to the woods along the river in an area that was known as "cyclone timber". The Zeigler Mine 2 area and pump station were slightly damaged in this area as well. The trees on Charles Clark's place were blown down in all directions. Further east, a large steel bridge 150 feet long on the Illinois Central Railroad was shifted many feet off its foundation. Exiting the Big Muddy River, the tornado entered the small rural community of Plumfield. Three people were killed when the Plumfield School was completely blown away, along with the neighbouring White Church, killing 26 people—20 of whom perished immediately and another five in the days to come. The last victim, Gervia Burgess, died the following year.

The tornado then began heading towards the large mining town of West Frankfort. The tornado struck the northwest side of town, where in a manner similar to what was seen at Murphysboro, a number of densely populated neighborhoods, businesses and mining operations fell victim to the tornado. The newly constructed New Orient Mine #2 quoted as being the "largest coal mine in the world" at the time, was heavily damaged. The mine's surface structures were severely damaged, and some buildings were destroyed including the mine's water tower. Extreme damage continued east of town, as a railroad trestle was torn from its supports, and 300 ft (91 m) of railroad track was ripped from the ground and blown away. The immediate storm claimed 81 lives at West Frankfort, while injuring a further 410, 21 of whom later died, bringing the death toll for the town to 102.

Several small mining villages in the area were obliterated, resulting in numerous fatalities. At Caldwell, a mining village northeast of West Frankfort, 43 people died in the storm, later to be joined by two more of the injured. The heaviest loss to befall a single family was exacted on that of Caldwell storekeeper Isaac 'Ike' Karnes, who lost 11 members immediately and two additional members later. Karnes' wife, a married daughter and her husband, a daughter-in-law and seven grandchildren, ages ranging from newborn to seven years, died in the tornado. In Caldwell, the local Peabody Mine #18 was completely destroyed by the tornado and the tipple tower was pulled from the ground by its concrete foundation.

Further to the northeast, the tornado then completely destroyed the small town of Parrish, killing 28 people and injuring 60, five of whom later died, bringing the death toll at Parrish to 33. The destruction of the town was so complete that many residents and businesses moved on, and the town was never rebuilt. The storm continued to devastate more rural areas in the eastern side of the county, claiming another six lives. In all, the storm claimed 192 lives in Franklin County: 159 in the immediate impact and another 33 among the injured in the following weeks.

=== Hamilton and White County, Illinois ===
The tornado proceeded to devastate additional rural areas across Hamilton and White counties, between the two counties claiming 45 lives and injuring 140, 20 of whom later died. As the tornado charged across Hamilton County south of McLeansboro, the tornado reached its greatest width at over 1.5 miles (2.4 km) and close to 2 miles wide. Dozens of farms, homes, schools and churches were swept away, 28 people were killed, and nine more were mortally wounded. In White County the tornado passed just two miles north of Carmi, missing the towns of Enfield and Crossville by just a few hundred yards. Another 18 were killed and 11 of those later died as a result of their injuries.

=== Posey, Gibson, and Pike County, Indiana ===
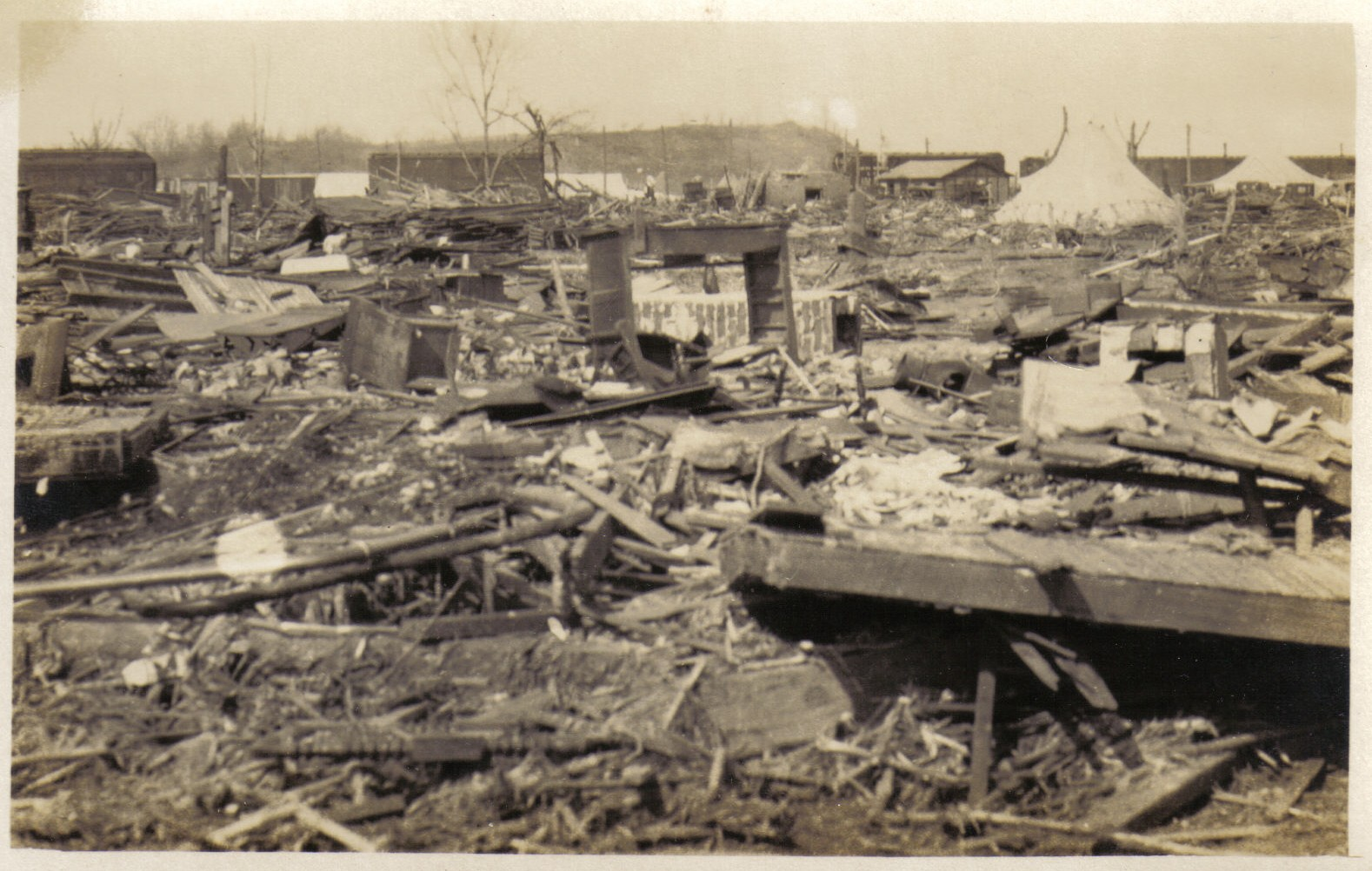
Ruins of the town of Griffin, Indiana, where 44 people were killed

Crossing the Wabash River just north of New Harmony, the tornado then entered Indiana. Grazing the northernmost edge of Posey County, the tornado struck and completely demolished the town of Griffin, where not a single structure was left untouched by the storm, and many were completely swept away; 41 people were killed at Griffin and in the surrounding areas, another 202 were injured, with five later dying, bringing the death toll at Griffin to 46.

After exiting Griffin, the tornado made a slight turn towards the northeast as it crossed into Gibson County, devastating rural areas and clipping the northwest corner of Owensville, resulting in nine fatalities. The tornado then roared into the large factory town of Princeton, destroying much of the southern side of the town, killing 38 people and injuring 152, six of whom later died. Large sections of neighborhoods in Princeton were leveled, and a Heinz factory was badly damaged. The tornado traveled more than 10 mi (16 km) to the northeast, crossing into Pike County before finally dissipating at about 4:30 p.m. CST, near Oatsville. In Indiana, at least 95 (and probably more) perished.

== Aftermath ==
=== Fatalities ===
Front Page of the Anderson Daily Bulletin covering the aftermath of the tornado

The tornado was the deadliest in United States history, with 695 people being killed. In the immediate aftermath, hospitals from St. Louis to Evansville were inundated with the injured and dying, as the storm injured more than 2,000 people, 105 of whom later died from their injuries. In Missouri, relief trains carried the most seriously injured north to St. Louis, while the remainder were sent to hospitals at Perryville and Cape Girardeau. At Gorham, where half the town's population was injured, the Missouri Pacific Railroad shuttled most of the injured north to East St. Louis, and the remainder south to Cairo.

The town hospital in Murphysboro, where several hundred were injured, was ill-equipped to deal with the casualties, prompting hundreds to be shipped out to other towns by train once the lines were cleared. The most seriously injured were sent by train to Barnes Hospital in St. Louis. For most of the injured, dying and destitute from Murphysboro, the college town of Carbondale, some seven miles to the southeast, provided a safe haven. However, at De Soto, chaos ensued as the affected were scattered in three different directions; six miles south to Carbondale, five miles east to Hurst, or for many, fourteen miles north to Du Quoin. For the tornado victims at Parrish, relief came from Thompsonville three miles to the southeast, where a team of railroad workers with the Illinois Central Railroad led by a heroic physician from Iowa, pulled a train directly into the demolished village. The train was loaded beyond capacity with the dead, injured and dying before proceeding to the northwest to the hospital at Benton.

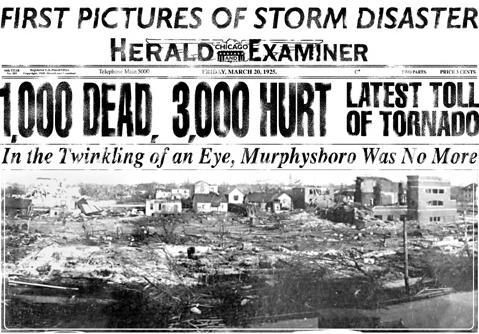
Newspaper coverage of the tornado from the Chicago Herald and Examiner

The storm claimed its final victim on January 3, 1926, when Gervais Burgess, a 46-year-old coal miner from West Frankfort, died from injuries sustained in the tornado. In addition to the dead and injured, thousands were left without shelter or food. Fires erupted, growing to conflagrations in some places, exacerbating the damage. Looting and theft, notably of the property of the dead, was reported. Recovery was generally slow, with the event leaving a lasting blow to the region.

In the end, a total of 695 were confirmed dead: 12 in Missouri, 95 in Indiana and 588 in Illinois. Three states, 14 counties, and more than 19 communities, four of which were effectively effaced (several of these and other rural areas never recovered), were in the path of the tornado, which had lasted a record duration of three and a half hours. Approximately 15,000 homes were destroyed by the tornado. Total damage was estimated at $16.5 million in 1925 dollars; adjusted for increases in population/wealth and inflation, the toll is approximately $2.9 billion (2024 USD), surpassed only by two extremely destructive tornadoes, each of which was posthumously rated F4, both in the City of St. Louis, in 1896 and 1927.

Exactly 57 schools across three states were damaged or destroyed, in which 90 people (mostly students) were killed. More schools were destroyed and more students killed (as well as the single school record of 33 deaths in De Soto, Illinois) than in any other tornadic event in U.S. history. Deaths occurred at many rural schools. Counting those returning home from schools and those that died in schools, the toll was 72 students. Approximately one-third of the tornado's victims were children.

=== Legacy ===
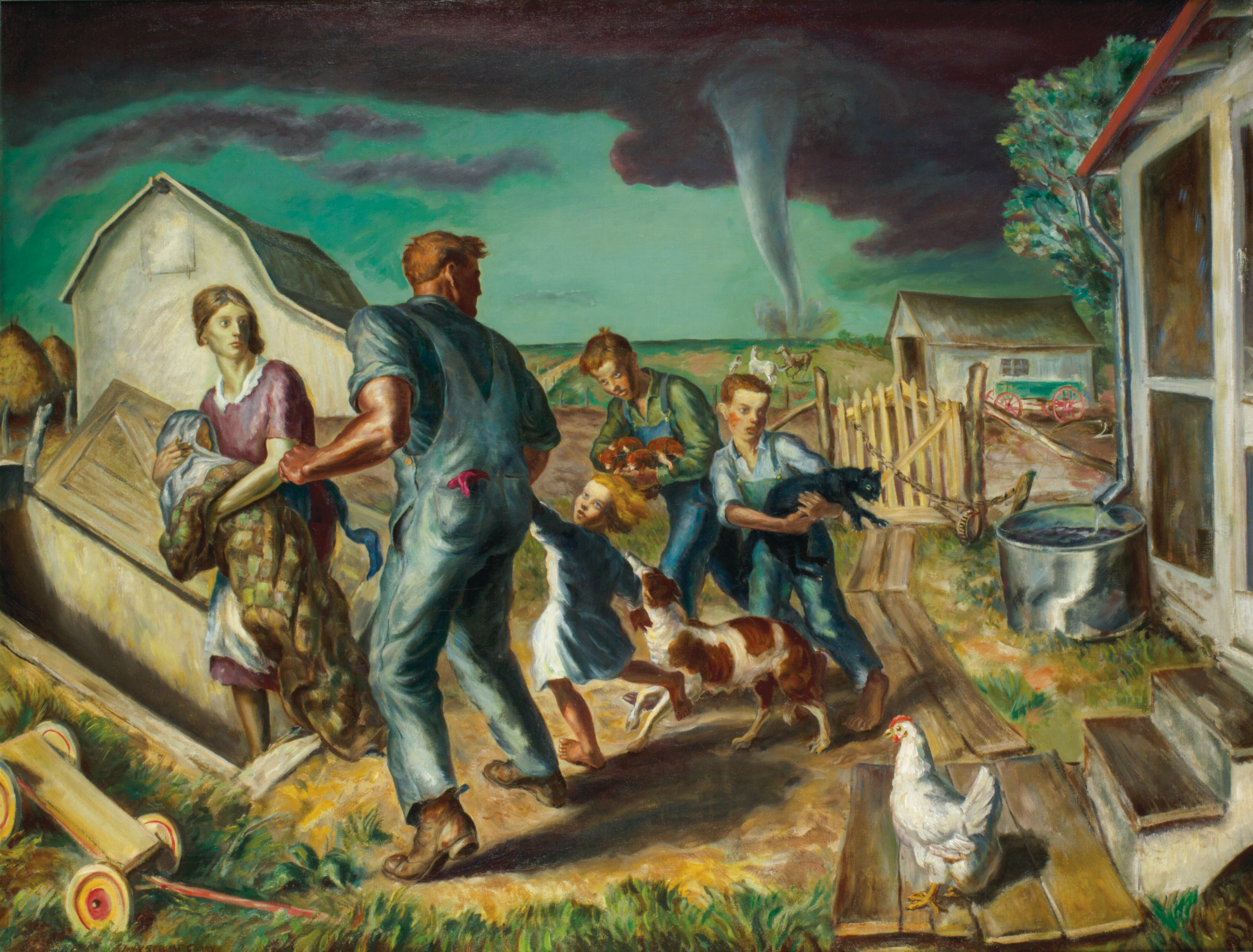
Tornado over Kansas (John Steuart Curry, 1929)

The devastating tornado was cited by Peter J. Thuesen as a marked shift in the relation between tornadoes and divine entities in his book Tornado God: American Religion and Violent Weather. Prior to this, tornadoes were often described as the Wrath of God, however, following this tornado, multiple area ministers stated that the tornado was not divine punishment, with one minister from Illinois stating "It was not God who hurt Murphysboro's babies".

WGBH-TV, a PBS affiliate in Boston, Massachusetts, asserts that John Steuart Curry's painting Tornado over Kansas visually referenced the Tri-State tornado.

== Modern research and theories ==
=== Appearances and behavior ===
According to the National Weather Service, no photographs or film reels of the tornado were taken or are known to exist. The tornado was frequently described by witnesses as an "amorphous rolling fog" or "boiling clouds on the ground", and fooled normally weather-wise farm owners who did not sense the danger until the storm was upon them. This was compounded by the fact that the weather beforehand was very unusual for such a violent tornado: snow flurries were reported the night before, Carbondale, IL (near Murphysboro) had a high of only 69 °F (21 °C) the day of, it was cloudy and rainy all morning, and then the tornado hit in the early afternoon at around 2:30 p.m., all the exact opposites of what would be expected. The condensation funnel was also reportedly sometimes wrapped in copious dust and debris, which likely obscured it and made it less recognizable. The parent supercell apparently transitioned to a high-precipitation (HP) variety by the time it struck West Frankfort, meaning that the tornado was not readily visible as it approached, as it was often shrouded in heavy rain and hail.

The tornado was often accompanied by extreme downburst winds throughout the entirety of its course; the accompanying downburst periodically increased the width of the damage path from the overall average of 0.75 mi (1.21 km), varying from 1 to 3 mi (1.6 to 4.8 km) wide at times.

=== Validity of track length ===
There has long been uncertainty as to whether the originally recognized reports of a 219-mile (352 km) path over 3.5 hours represent a single continuous tornado or multiple independently tracking tornadoes belonging to a tornado family. Because of the scarcity of verifiable meteorological data from the time of the event and the apparent absence of any record of a tornado having neared this path length and duration in the years since, doubts have been raised about the plausibility of the conclusion that a single tornado was responsible for them. To date no definitive conclusion has been reached and a complete understanding of what occurred remains unachieved.

Modern meteorological theory regarding tornado and supercell morphology and dynamics suggests that a single tornado lasting for such a duration is highly improbable. Several other historical accounts of very long track (VLT) tornadoes have subsequently been determined to be the product of tornado families (notably the Charleston-Mattoon, Illinois tornado family of May 1917 and the Woodward, Oklahoma tornado family of April 1947). In more recent years, some VLT tornadoes and supercells have indeed occurred, with 12 tornadoes exceeding 100-mile (160 km) path lengths from 1980 to 2012, and 60 since 1950. Yet the high-end estimates of the Tri-State Tornado's path length are still far longer than the nearest verified VLT tornado. No single factor accounts for the exceptional path length and duration, though the fast forward motion of the tornado, which averaged 59 mph (95 km/h), may have translated to more distance covered.

In 2001, tornado expert Tom Grazulis wrote that the first 60 miles (97 km) of the track was probably the result of two or more tornadoes, and that a 157-mile (253 km) segment of the overall path length was seemingly continuous. Exhaustive research published in 2013 found no definitive resolution, but did locate additional tornado sightings and damage 15 mi (24 km) west of the previously known beginning of the tornado and 1 mi (1.6 km) east of the previously known ending, extending the total path length by 16 miles (26 km) to 235 mi (378 km) long. The scientists concluded it is likely that at least some of the track, both at the beginning and ending, was indeed caused by separate tornadoes. They also located a 20 mi (32 km) path (apparently created within a period of about 20 minutes) from a large tornado which was likely spawned from the same supercell and was about 65 mi (105 km) east-northeast of the aforementioned path ending. This brings the known length of the Tri-State Tornado family to around 320 mi (510 km) over nearly 5.5 hours.

The 2013 study concluded with moderate confidence that the 174 mi (280 km) segment from central Madison County, Missouri to Pike County, Indiana, was the result of one continuous tornado, and high confidence that the 151 mi (243 km) segment from central Bollinger County, Missouri to western Pike County, Indiana, was the result of a single continuous tornado. The first value would hold the record for the longest recorded tornado track, but the latter would be second behind the 165-mile (266 km) track of the Western Kentucky tornado, another extremely long-tracked violent tornado which occurred on December 10, 2021. However, the 151-to-174-mile-long (243 to 280 km) figures for the path are considered most likely to be continuous solely because observations were sufficiently dense, whereas the 219-mile-long (352 km) figure from westernmost Reynolds County, Missouri, to westernmost Pike County, Indiana, contained several gaps in which eyewitnesses and reports of damage were lacking, owing primarily to sparse patterns of human settlement, but this may well have been continuous because the alignment of reports showed a consistent heading, suggestive of a single tornado rather than a family.

== See also ==
- List of notable media in the field of meteorology
- 2021 Monette-Samburg tornado, an EF4 tornado that moved across three states in 2021
- List of F5, EF5, and IF5 tornadoes
- List of Illinois tornadoes

== Notes and footnotes ==
=== Sources ===
- Akin, Wallace E. (2002). The Forgotten Storm: The Great Tri-state Tornado of 1925. Guilford, Connecticut: Lyons Press. ISBN 1-58574-607-X.
- Partlow, Geoff (2014). America's Deadliest Twister: The Tri-State Tornado of 1925. Carbondale, IL: Southern Illinois University Press. ISBN 9780809333462.
- Maddox, Robert A.; Gilmore, M. S.; Doswell III, C. A.; Johns, R. H.; et al. (2013). "Meteorological Analyses of the Tri-State Tornado Event of March 1925". e-Journal of Severe Storms Meteorology. 8 (1): 1–27. doi:10.55599/ejssm.v8i1.46.
- Doswell III, Charles A.; Burgess, D. W. (1988). "On Some Issues of United States Tornado Climatology". Mon. Wea. Rev. 116 (2): 495–501. Bibcode:1988MWRv..116..495D. doi:10.1175/1520-0493(1988)116<0495:OSIOUS>2.0.CO;2.
- Johns, Bob (2012). The 1925 Tri-State Tornado's Devastation In Franklin County, Hamilton County, And White County, Illinois. Bloomington, IN: AuthorHouse. ISBN 978-1468560961.
  - —; Burgess, D. W.; Doswell III, C. A.; Gilmore, M. S.; et al. (2013). "The 1925 Tri-State Tornado Damage Path and Associated Storm System". e-Journal of Severe Storms Meteorology. 8 (2): 1–33. doi:10.55599/ejssm.v8i2.47.
- Mason, Angela (2011). Death Rides the Sky: The Story of the 1925 Tri-State Tornado. Rockford, IL: Black Oak Media. ISBN 978-1-61876-001-2.
- Grazulis, Thomas P. (May 1984). Violent Tornado Climatography, 1880–1982. OSTI (Technical report). NUREG. Washington, D.C.: Nuclear Regulatory Commission. OSTI 7099491. CR-3670.
  - — (July 1993). Significant Tornadoes 1680–1991: A Chronology and Analysis of Events. St. Johnsbury, Vermont: The Tornado Project of Environmental Films. ISBN 1-879362-03-1.
  - — (2001a). The Tornado: Nature's Ultimate Windstorm. Norman: University of Oklahoma Press. ISBN 978-0-8061-3538-0.

==== Further reading ====
- Flora, Snowden D. (1953). Tornadoes of the United States. Norman, OK: University of Oklahoma Press.
- Felknor, Peter S. (1992). The Tri-State Tornado: The Story of America's Greatest Tornado Disaster. Ames, IA: Iowa State University Press. ISBN 0-8138-0623-2.

Preceded by None	Costliest U.S. tornadoes on Record; Tri-State (1925)	Succeeded by Tuscaloosa, AL (2011)
