= Moore Township, Shannon County, Missouri =

Inactive township in the American state of Missouri

Coordinates: 37.3447°N 91.2497°W

Moore Township is an inactive township in Shannon County, in the U.S. state of Missouri.

Moore Township was erected in 1842, and named after Robert E. Moore, an early settler. The infamous Tri-State Tornado (which was possibly a tornado family) was first sighted in the area and would cause over 700 fatalities across Missouri, Illinois, and Indiana.
