= Oatsville, Indiana =

Unincorporated community in Indiana, United States

- Unincorporated community
- Location within Indiana Location within the United States
- Coordinates: 38°24′25″N 87°24′27″W
- Country: United States
- State: Indiana
- County: Gibson, Pike
- Township: Washington, Logan
- Elevation: 443 ft (135 m)
- Time zone: UTC-5 (Eastern (EST))
  - Summer (DST): UTC-4 (EDT)
- ZIP code: 47567
- Area code: 812
- GNIS feature ID: 440490

Oatsville is an unincorporated community in Gibson and Pike counties, in the U.S. state of Indiana.

== History ==
A post office was established at Oatsville in 1876, and remained in operation until it was discontinued in 1903.

The city is where the infamous Tri-state Tornado finally dissipated at about 4:30pm local time after tracking through Missouri, Illinois and Indiana. The tornado is thought to have been an F5, and was likely at F0-F1 intensity as it dissipated.
