= Tornadoes of 1925 =

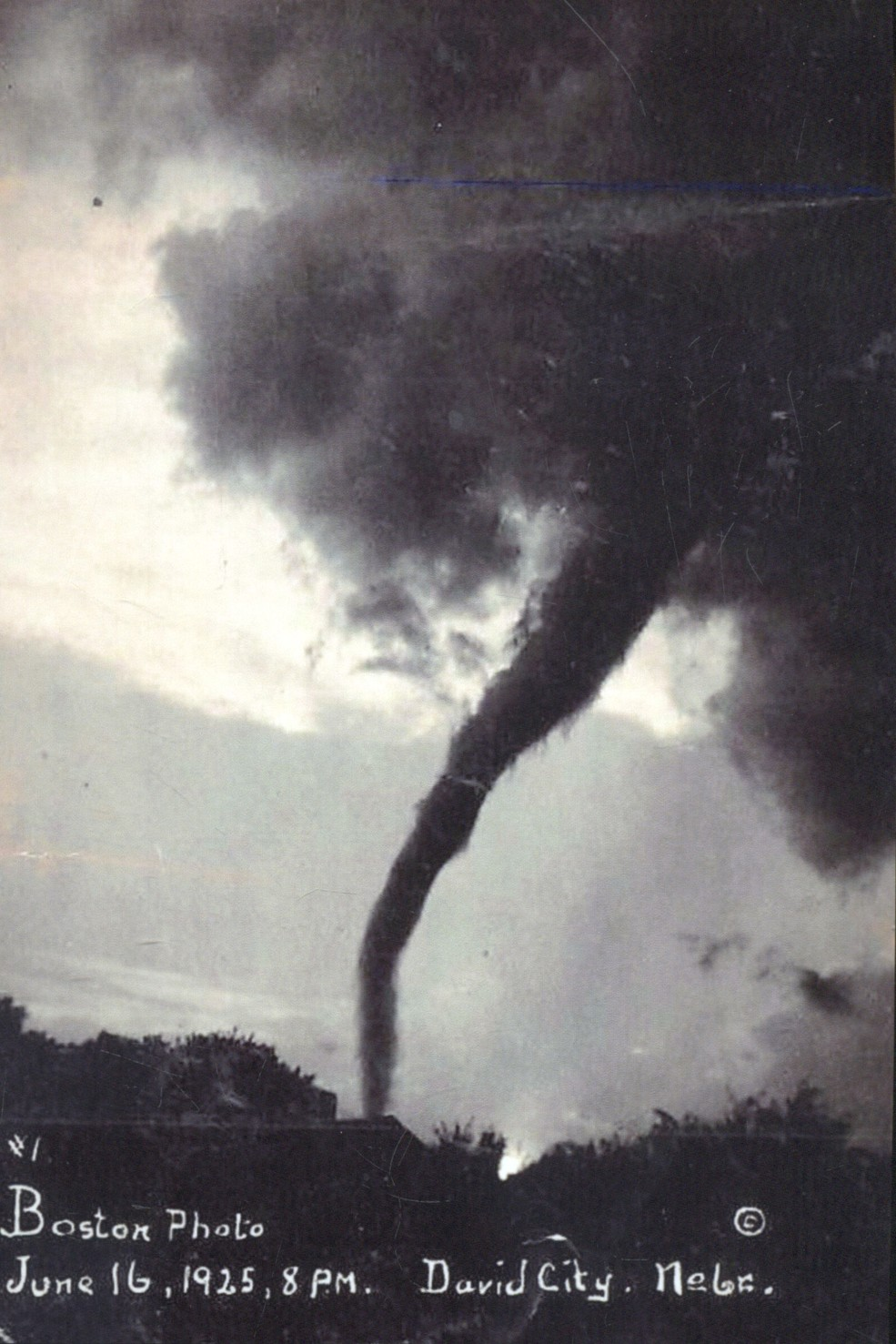
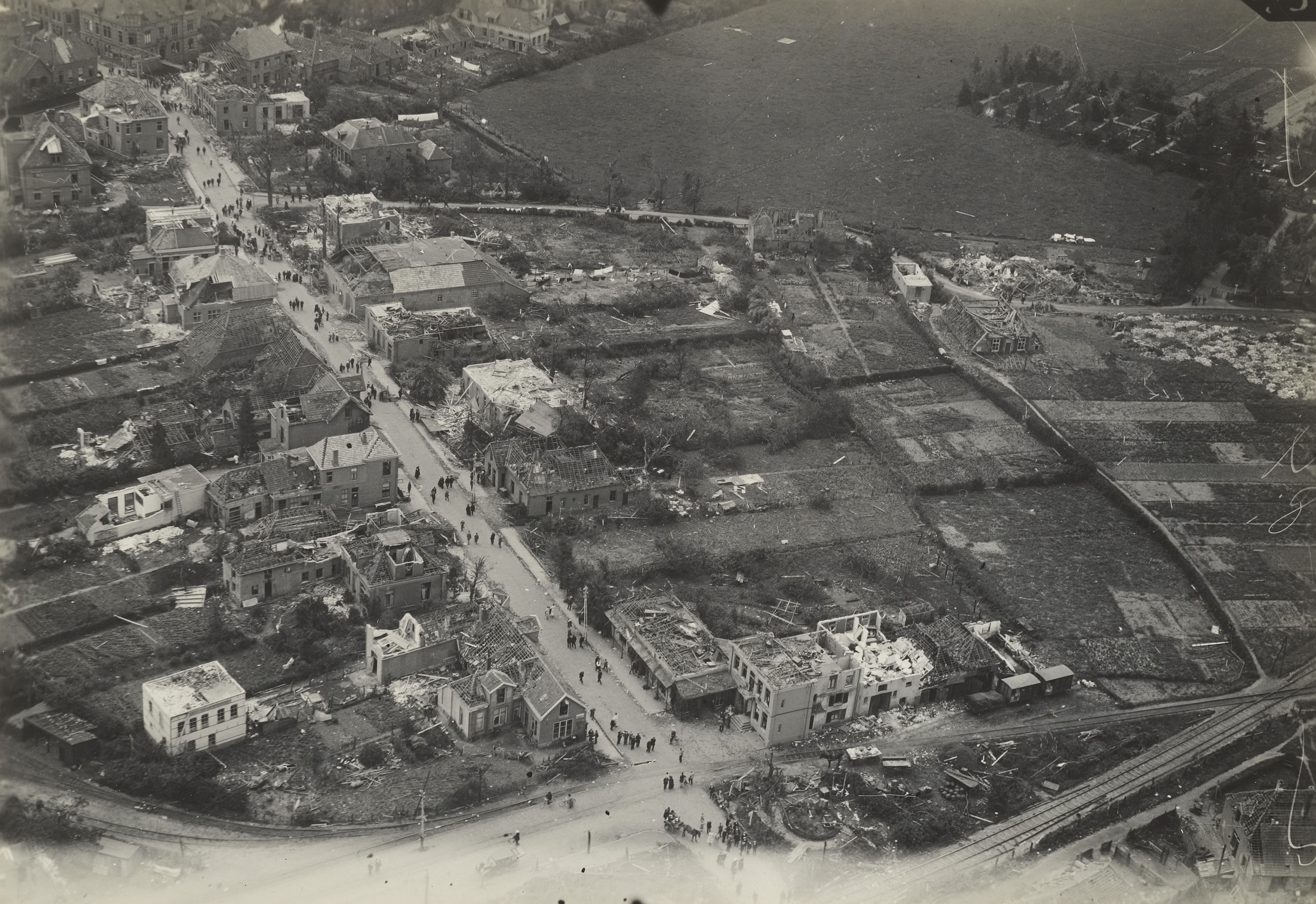
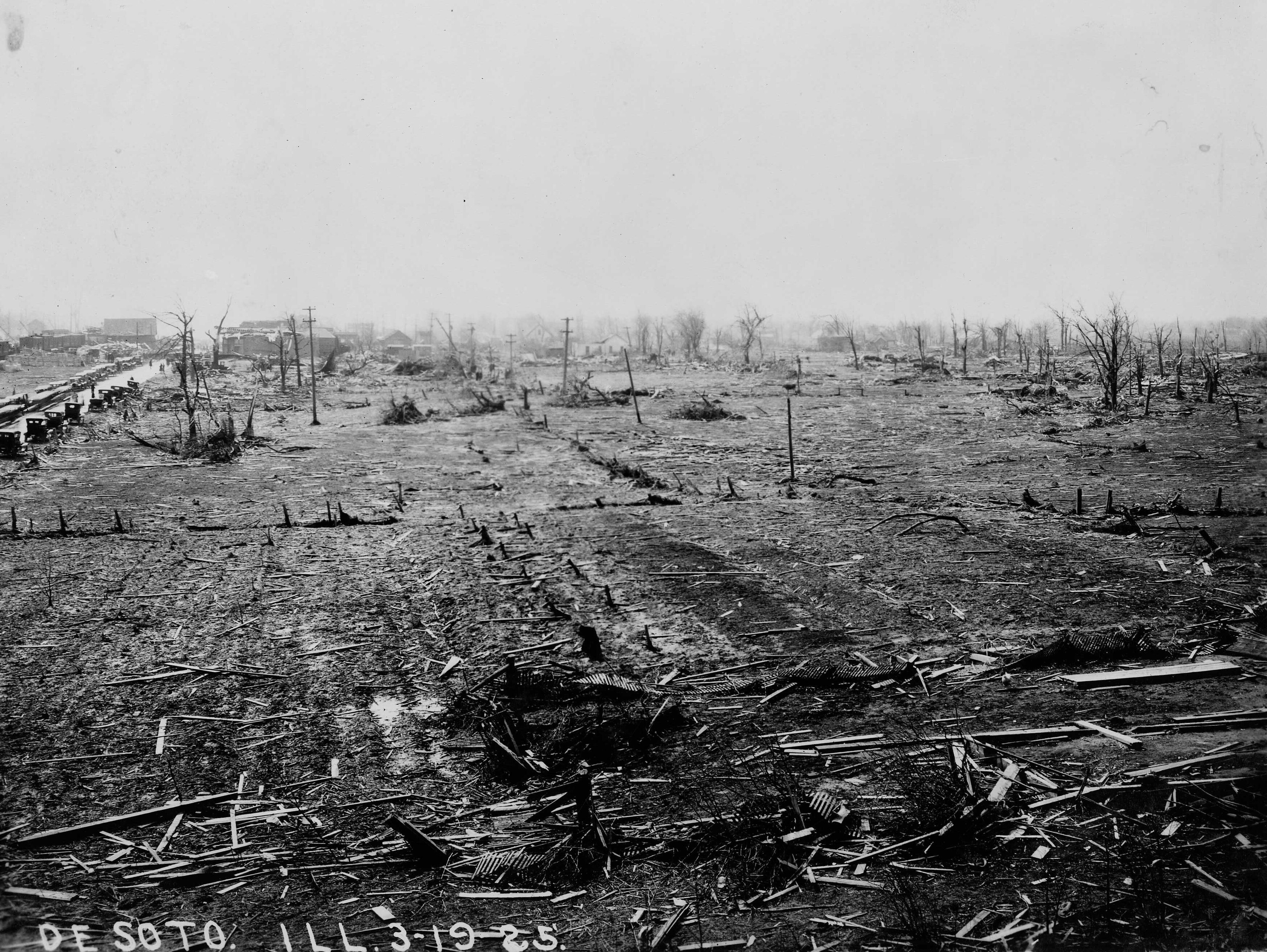
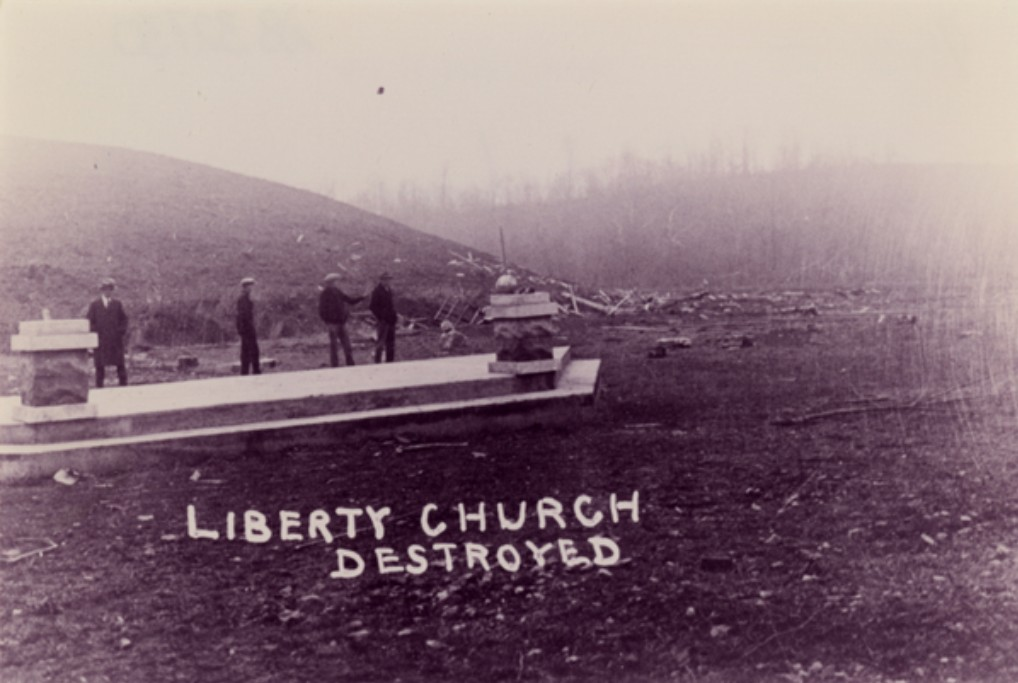
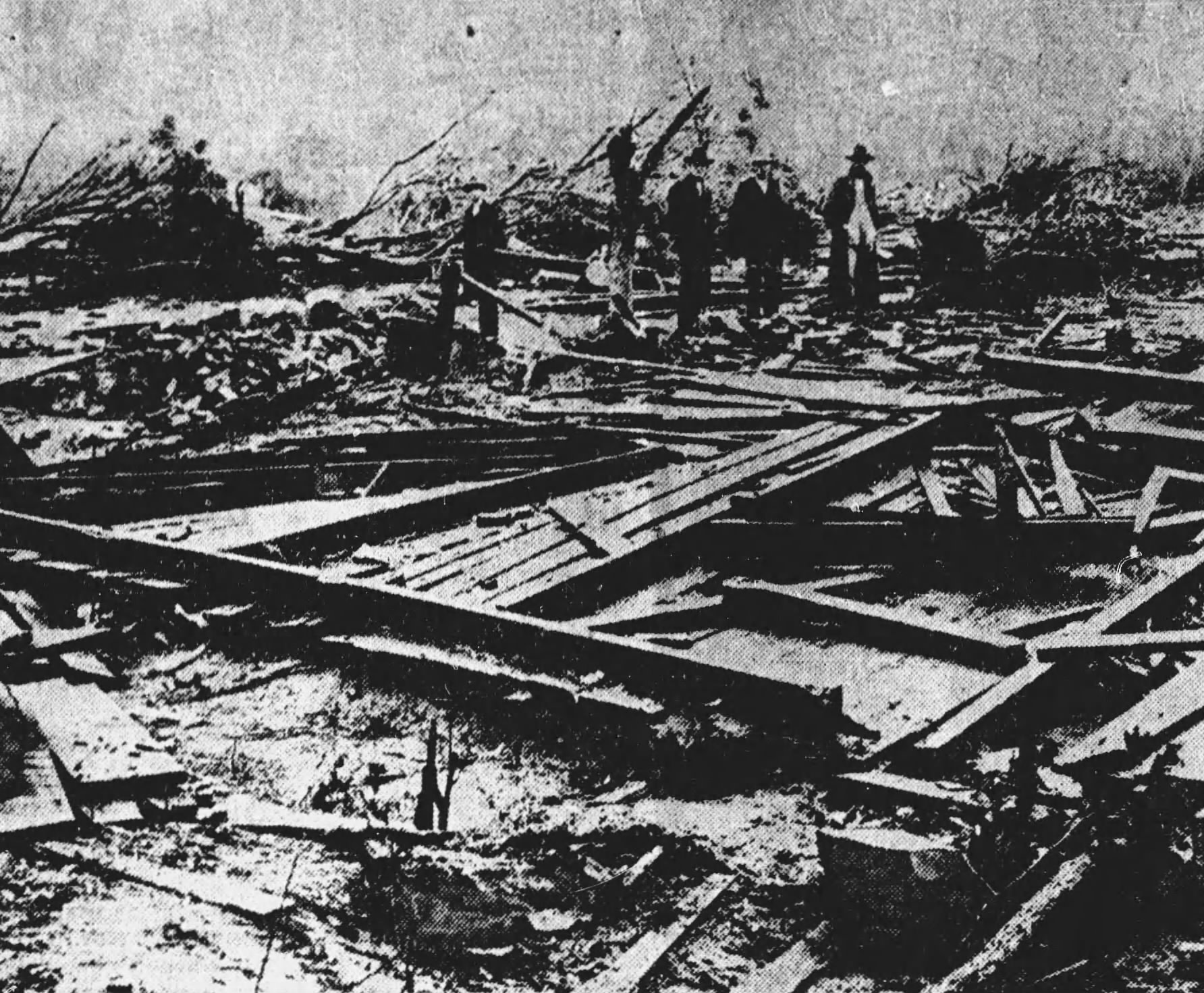
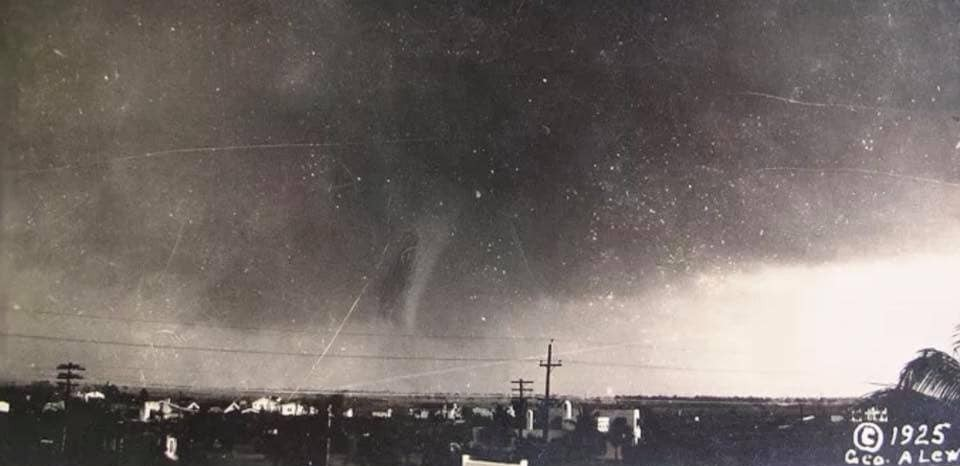
- Clockwise from top: A thin F2 tornado near David City, Nebraska on June 16; Extreme damage in Desoto, Illinois following a violent F5 tornado on March 18; The ruins of a two-story home near Troy, Alabama following an F4 tornado on October 24; An F3 tornado shortly after formation in Miami, Florida on April 5; The ruins of a church near Gallatin, Tennessee following a violent F4+ tornado on March 18; An aerial photo of Borculo after an IF4 tornado on August 10.
- Timespan: January 6 — December 13
- Maximum rated tornado: F5 tornado: Missouri, Illinois and Indiana on March 18
- Tornadoes in U.S.: 100
- Fatalities (U.S.): >805
- Fatalities (worldwide): >806

This page documents notable tornadoes and tornado outbreaks worldwide in 1925. Strong and destructive tornadoes form most frequently in the United States, Argentina, Southern Brazil, the Bengal region and China, but can occur almost anywhere under the right conditions. Tornadoes also develop occasionally in southern Canada during summer in the Northern Hemisphere and somewhat regularly at other times of the year across Europe, South Africa, Japan, Australia and New Zealand. Tornadic events are often accompanied by other forms of severe weather, including thunderstorms, strong winds and hail.

1925 was the deadliest year for tornadoes in recorded history for North America, with over 800 fatalities being recorded. 695 deaths were from a single, long-tracked tornado that moved through Missouri, Illinois and Indiana.

== January ==
=== January 10 ===
An F2 tornado destroyed several barns in Coffee County, Alabama, injuring three people. Another F2 tornado moved through the same area four hours later, destroying a home in Elba. A third F2 tornado damaged two homes in Pike County.

== February ==
=== February 8 ===
An F2 tornado destroyed a home and cotton mill in Mulberry, Arkansas.

=== February 21–22 ===
A tornado inflicted F2-rated damage to homes in the Pooleville, Oklahoma area; damage costs totaled an estimated $60,000 (1925 USD). Another F3 tornado killed one person in Loco, Oklahoma, while an F2 tornado deroofed several homes in Okmulgee County. Early on February 22, an F2 tornado injured one person and destroyed a multi-story home near Bearden, Arkansas.

== March ==
=== March 10 ===
On the afternoon of March 10, an F2 tornado moved through Edgar County, Illinois and Vigo County, Indiana, injuring three people. The tornado damaged several farmsteads and dissipated over the Saint Mary-of-the-Woods College campus.

=== March 13 ===
An F2-rated tornado damaged four homes near Bernice, Louisiana.

=== March 17–18 ===
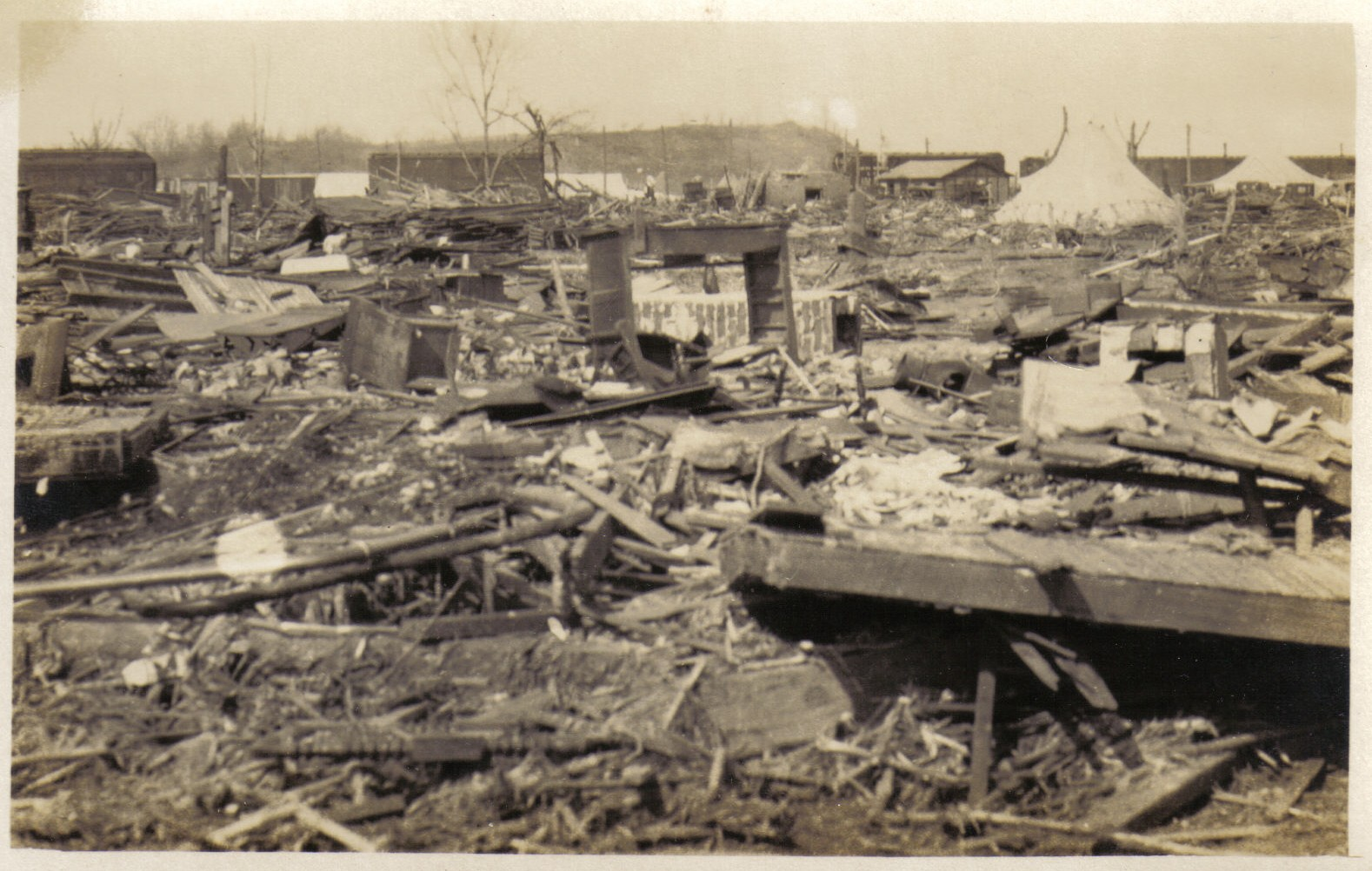
Destruction from the Tri-State tornado in Griffin, Indiana

On March 18, one of the deadliest tornado outbreaks in recorded history generated at least 12 significant tornadoes and spanned a large portion of the midwestern and southern United States. The outbreak was one of the deadliest tornado outbreak in U.S. history. The outbreak generated several destructive tornadoes in Missouri, Illinois, and Indiana on the same day, as well as significant tornadoes in Alabama and Kansas.

The outbreak included the "tri-state" tornado, the deadliest tornado in United States history and the second-deadliest registered in world history. The 219-mile-long (352 km) track left by the tornado, as it crossed from southeastern Missouri, through southern Illinois, and then into southwestern Indiana, is also the longest ever recorded. Modern meteorological re-analysis has suggested that the extremely long path length and lifespan reported in historical accounts are perhaps more plausibly attributed to multiple independent tornadoes belonging to a tornado family, rather than a single, continuous tornado. Although not officially rated by the National Oceanic and Atmospheric Administration, the tri-state Tornado is recognized by most experts, such as Tom Grazulis and Ted Fujita, as an F5 tornado, the maximum damage rating that a tornado can attain on the Fujita scale.

== April ==
=== April 5 ===
In the midday hours of April 5, an F3-rated tornado moved through Miami-Dade County, Florida, killing five people in the Miami metropolitan area.

=== April 8 ===
An F2 tornado injured 75 people in Lincoln and Creek counties in Oklahoma. Another F2 tornado tornado destroyed three homes south of Thackerville, Oklahoma; damage from the tornado totaled an estimated $10,000 (1925 USD).

=== April 10 ===
On April 10, an F2 tornado destroyed two barns north of Chilton, Wisconsin.

=== April 13 ===
An F2-rated tornado moved through the southeastern portions of Kokomo, Indiana, injuring one person.

=== April 19 ===
Two F2-rated tornadoes touched down in Pennsylvania, the first moving through Westmoreland County and the second tracking across Mifflin County. Both tornadoes damaged structures but no casualties were recorded.

=== April 21 ===
An F2-rated tornado killed a child and damaged a large barn near Cresco, Iowa.

=== April 23 ===
April 23 saw a few tornadoes in the Kansas, Missouri and South Dakota. An F2 tornado damaged several homes near Dunlap, Kansas, while another F2-rated tornado uprooted trees and toppled chimneys in Atchison County, Kansas before crossing the Missouri River. A final F2 tornado in Lincoln County, South Dakota killed several livestock and destroyed two barns.

=== April 26 ===
An F3 tornado killed two people and swept away small houses in Madill, Oklahoma.

=== April 28 ===
Three people were killed and 40 more were injured by a cone tornado east of Kyle, Texas that produced F2-rated damage.

== May ==
=== May 16 ===
An F3-rated tornado moved from Attica, Ohio to Oberlin, Ohio, destroying several barns and injuring ten people. Damages from the tornado totaled an estimated $100,000 (1925 USD).

=== May 24 ===
On the afternoon of May 24, an F2 tornado destroyed structures near Valley Bend, West Virginia, killing three (Note: The three deaths may have been from a downburst.) people.

== June ==
=== June 1–6 ===
The start of June saw an active tornadic period across the Great Plains region. On June 1, an F3 tornado impacted and destroyed five farms near Galva, Kansas. An F2 tornado south of Marlette, Michigan killed several cattle and destroyed two farmsteads. The final tornado on June 1, rated high-end F2, damaged tipples southeast of Pittsburg, Kansas. June 2 was particularly active, with 11 tornadoes touching down. The first injured two people and produced F2-rated damage in Ionia County, Michigan. Another F2 tornado near Clarkson, Nebraska damaged four farms. A violent F4 tornado killed three people in Madison County, Nebraska, while an F3 tornado north of Douglas, Nebraska inflicted $200,000 (1925 USD) in damage to several farms and barns. An F2 tornado in Glenwood, Iowa injured four people and an F4 tornado produced extensive structural damage near Smithland, Iowa. In Riley County, Kansas, an F2 tornado destroyed several barns. A high-end F3 tornado damaged twenty farms northeast of Red Oak, Iowa, and a high-end F2 tornado heavily damaged a home near Emmetsburg, Iowa. An F4 tornado killed three people along a 14-mile (23 km) path through areas near Adair, Iowa. The final confirmed tornado on June 2 destroyed 11 farms at F2 intensity in Clark County, Wisconsin.

June 3 saw a small but violent outbreak of tornadoes in Wisconsin and Iowa. The first confirmed tornado on June 3, rated F2, killed two people near Florence, Wisconsin; the tornado set aloft and tossed an entire school building into a house. Twin F4 tornadoes injured thirty people and killed one in Pottawattamie and Harrison counties in Iowa. Tornado expert Thomas P. Grazulis described the tornadoes as "enormous" and stated that they were possibly of F5 intensity. An F2 tornado tracked through the northwestern portions of Tennant, Iowa, damaging several buildings. An F3 tornado injured one person near Dana, Iowa while the final tornado on June 3 produced F2-rated damage over the same area. On June 5, two tornadoes touched down; the first produced low-end F2 damage to homes in the southern portions of Fargo, North Dakota. The second tornado, likely a tornado family, tracked 90 miles (140 km) from Presho to Miller, South Dakota. The tornado produced F2 damage to several barns.

Two tornadoes, both rated F3, touched down on June 6 in Colorado. The first passed through areas in Washington County and the second injured six people in Wray.

=== June 11–16 ===
June 11 through June 16 saw another active period of severe weather. On June 11, several tornadoes touched down in Iowa and Minnesota; the first injured 18 people and produced F3-rated damage to homes in Alexander, Iowa. Another F2 tornado damaged homes near Chapin, Iowa, while an F2 tornado injured eight people northwest of Greene, Iowa. A tornado produced F2-rated damage south of Marble Rock, Iowa, while a tornado damaged a barn in the Conger, Minnesota area. The final tornado on June 11 destroyed three barns at F2 intensity in Worth County, Iowa. On June 14, an F1 tornado killed a child in Pueblo, Colorado and another F3 tornado struck a farmsteads and uprooted trees in Hancock County, Illinois. On June 15, an F2 tornado destroyed barns near Clay Center, Kansas, while another tornado produced F2-rated damage at a maximum width of 1 mile (1.6 km). The tornado, which tracked across Ottawa County, Kansas, caused damage that would later total an estimated $100,000 (1925 USD). On June 16, three tornadoes, all rated F2, touched down in Nebraska. The first destroyed several barns in the Blue Hill area, and the second impacted five farmsteads south of Central City. The third and final tornado swept away a school near Prague.

=== June 18 ===
An F2 tornado described as a "large black pillar" killed five cattle and damaged a farm in Barnes County, North Dakota.

=== June 28 ===
A tornado produced F2-rated damage to small houses in Fremont County, Iowa. Damage from the tornado totaled $10,000 (1925 USD).

== July ==
=== July 7 ===
An F2-rated tornado in Cottle County, Texas destroyed two structures; damage would later total $5,000 (1925 USD).

=== July 18 ===
A small F2 tornado in Ellis County, Texas destroyed one house, injuring five people.

=== July 24 ===
A tornado produced F2-rated damage on the western side of Tampa, Florida, destroying two homes and tossing pieces of furniture hundreds of yards.

=== July 29–30 ===
On July 29, an F1-rated tornado damaged stores and killed one person in Iola, Kansas. July 30 saw an F2 tornado that injured five people in Navarro County, Texas. The tornado, which "scattered" a home, was accompanied by damaging downburst winds.

== August ==
=== August 10–12 (Europe) ===
Several strong tornadoes touched down across North-Central Europe, particularly the Netherlands and Germany. At least 10 tornadoes touched down, particularly on August 10. In the Netherlands, the village of Langenboom and nearby villages were devastated, killing six people. Tens of farms being reduced to rubble and the town's church was almost completely collapsed. In Heumen, an IF3 tornado collapsed two houses. Most notably, in Borculo, a violent F4 tornado destroyed parts of the town, seriously damaging the church and sweeping houses away, killing four. An F3 tornado killed another person near Uetersen, Germany. One tornado touched down in the United Kingdom the next day, and an F2 tornado touched down in Czechoslovakia (modern-day Czechia) the following day. Overall, at least 15 people were injured and 11 were killed—10 in the Netherlands and one in Germany.

=== August 16 ===
An F2-rated tornado destroyed a church southwest of Audubon, Minnesota.

=== August 20 ===
A tornado produced F2-rated damage to small homes in Carter County, Oklahoma; two people were injured when the tornado dropped debris into a storm cellar.

=== August 22 ===
An F1-rated tornado killed two people and injured nine others in Harris County, Texas.

=== August 25 (Italy) ===
A very likely tornado damaged or destroyed many buildings in Gorizia, killing a small girl and injuring four others.

=== August 29 ===
Numerous small homes were destroyed and two people were killed south of Electra, Texas, when a F2-rated tornado moved through the area.

== September ==
=== September 11 ===
On September 11, two unrelated F2-rated tornadoes touched down in DuPage County, Illinois and Washtenaw County, Michigan. Around 25 homes were destroyed in total by the two tornadoes.

== October ==
=== October 14 ===
An F2-rated tornado killed five people in East Baton Rouge Parish, Louisiana. All five fatalities occurred in one small home that was directly impacted by the tornado.

=== October 16 ===
On October 16, a series of tornadoes and downbursts moved from 6 mi (9.7 km) west of Bowling Green, Kentucky. The strongest received an F3 rating, with homes being wrecked west of Bowling Green and in Davenport on Barren River Pike. A car was blown off the road, hitting a fence and into a field. In Richardsville, additional damage occurred. In Edmonson County, barns and a hotel suffered severe damage. Canmer and Woodsonville were the hardest hit areas. The tornado led to one death and 44 others being injured.

=== October 24–25 ===
On October 24, an F2-rated tornado injured three people northeast of Covington, Tennessee. The next day, a powerful F4 tornado touched down in Crenshaw, Pike, Bullock, and Barbour Counties in Alabama, destroying dozens of homes in rural communities. 18 people were killed and 60 were injured in the tornado.

== November ==
=== November 7 ===
An F2 tornado impacted eight farms in Wilson County, Tennessee, destroying at least six barns.

=== November 26 ===
On November 26, two confirmed tornadoes touched down. The first, which produced F3-rated damage, injured one person in Wilson County, Tennessee. The second produced intense F3-rated damage and injured six people in Wilson County, Tennessee.

== December ==
=== December 4 ===
December 4 saw four tornadoes move through areas in the East South Central United States. The first, rated F2, skirted along the southern edge of Marshall, Arkansas, where a railroad depot was destroyed. Another F2 tornado tracked through Yazoo City, Mississippi, killing two people and injuring 25 others. An EF4 tornado in April 2010 took a similar path through Yazoo City, where ten people were killed. The third tornado produced extensive F2-rated damage in rural Marshall, Lyon and Caldwell counties in Kentucky, injuring five people. The fourth tornado on December 4 and final to be confirmed in 1925 touched down in nearby Calloway County, Kentucky before moving into Marshall County, inflicting F3-rated damage to a home and killing two people near Hardin, Kentucky.
