= National Register of Historic Places listings in Jackson County, Illinois =

Location of Jackson County in Illinois

This is a list of the National Register of Historic Places listings in Jackson County, Illinois.

This is intended to be a complete list of the properties and districts on the National Register of Historic Places in Jackson County, Illinois, United States. Latitude and longitude coordinates are provided for many National Register properties and districts; these locations may be seen together in a map.

There are 20 properties and districts listed on the National Register in the county. Another property was once listed but has been removed.

This National Park Service list is complete through NPS recent listings posted July 31, 2026.

== Current listings ==
	Name on the Register	Image	Date listed	Location	City or town	Description
1	Camp Pomona		May 26, 2026 (#100013044)	Address Restricted	Pomona	
2	Cleiman Mound and Village Site	Cleiman Mound and Village Site	October 18, 1977 (#77000487)	Northeast of the junction of Big Lake and Thomas Town Rds. 37°47′12″N 89°32′05″W	Gorham	
3	R. Buckminster Fuller and Anne Hewlett Dome Home	R. Buckminster Fuller and Anne Hewlett Dome Home	February 9, 2006 (#06000012)	407 S. Forest Ave. 37°43′23″N 89°13′31″W	Carbondale	
4	Giant City Stone Fort Site	Giant City Stone Fort Site	August 9, 2002 (#02000848)	Stone Fort Rd. 37°37′24″N 89°11′50″W	Makanda	
5	Grand Tower Mining, Manufacturing and Transportation Company Site	Grand Tower Mining, Manufacturing and Transportation Company Site	April 13, 1979 (#79000839)	Devil's Backbone Park; 37°38′06″N 89°30′30″W	Grand Tower	
6	Grange Hall	Grange Hall	May 4, 1990 (#90000722)	Illinois Routes 13/127 south of Beaucoup Creek; 37°49′10″N 89°19′19″W	Murphysboro	
7	Robert W. Hamilton House	Robert W. Hamilton House	March 5, 1982 (#82002540)	203 S. 13th St. 37°45′47″N 89°20′13″W	Murphysboro	
8	Cornelius Hennessy Building	Cornelius Hennessy Building	November 8, 2000 (#00001331)	1023 Chestnut St. 37°45′48″N 89°20′07″W	Murphysboro	
9	William H. Hull House	William H. Hull House	February 1, 2006 (#05001602)	1517 Walnut St. 37°45′51″N 89°20′25″W	Murphysboro	
10	Illinois Central Railroad Passenger Depot	Illinois Central Railroad Passenger Depot	May 9, 2002 (#02000457)	111 S. Illinois Ave. 37°43′36″N 89°12′59″W	Carbondale	
11	Jackson County Courthouse	Jackson County Courthouse	December 29, 2015 (#15000931)	1001 Walnut St. 37°45′51″N 89°20′06″W	Murphysboro	
12	Liberty Theater	Liberty Theater	June 13, 2012 (#12000322)	1333 Walnut St. 37°45′51″N 89°20′16″W	Murphysboro	
13	Mobile and Ohio Railroad Depot	Mobile and Ohio Railroad Depot	November 13, 1984 (#84000317)	1701 Walnut St. 37°45′51″N 89°20′31″W	Murphysboro	
14	Murphysboro Downtown Historic District	Murphysboro Downtown Historic District	December 20, 2022 (#100008487)	Roughly bounded by 9th, 15th, Locust, and Chestnut Sts. 37°45′51″N 89°20′09″W	Murphysboro	
15	Murphysboro Elks Lodge	Murphysboro Elks Lodge	November 15, 2005 (#05001255)	1329 Walnut St. 37°45′51″N 89°20′15″W	Murphysboro	
16	Murphysboro Masonic Lodge No. 498 A.F & A.M	Murphysboro Masonic Lodge No. 498 A.F & A.M	August 13, 2024 (#100010700)	1115 Chestnut St. 37°45′49″N 89°20′09″W	Murphysboro	
17	Reef House	Reef House	November 14, 1985 (#85002839)	411 S. Poplar St. 37°43′23″N 89°13′17″W	Carbondale	
18	Riverside Park Bandshell	Riverside Park Bandshell	June 6, 2012 (#12000323)	22nd and Commercial Sts. 37°45′22″N 89°21′25″W	Murphysboro	
19	West Walnut Street Historic District	West Walnut Street Historic District	May 2, 1975 (#75000664)	Roughly bounded by W. Elm, S. Poplar, W. Main, and S. Forest Sts. 37°43′32″N 89°13′28″W	Carbondale	
20	Woodlawn Cemetery	Woodlawn Cemetery	December 19, 1985 (#85003219)	405 E. Main St. 37°43′38″N 89°12′39″W	Carbondale	

== Former listing ==
	Name on the Register	Image	Date listed	Date removed	Location	City or town	Description
1	Dr. Frank M. Agnew House		September 13, 1978 (#78001152)	September 15, 1987	Southeast of Makanda on Illinois Route 12	Makanda	Destroyed by fire, August, 1987.

== See also ==
- List of National Historic Landmarks in Illinois
- National Register of Historic Places listings in Illinois
