= Hull House (disambiguation) =

Hull House was a historic settlement house in Chicago, Illinois, US.

Hull House may also refer to:

- William H. Hull House, Murphysboro, Illinois
- Warren Hull House, Lancaster, New York
- James Heyward Hull House, Shelby, North Carolina
- Jasper G. Hull House, a National Register of Historic Places listing in Hancock County, Ohio
- Patrick Hull House, Oneida, Ohio
- Hull House (Victoria, Texas), a National Register of Historic Places listing in Victoria County, Texas

== See also ==
- Hull Cabin Historic District, Grand Canyon South Rim, Arizona
- Hull-Hawkins House, Live Oak, Florida
- Hull-Wolcott House, Maumee, Ohio
- Hull Place, a National Register of Historic Places listing in Licking County, Ohio
- Cordell Hull Birthplace Cabin, in Cordell Hull Birthplace State Park, Byrdstown, Tennessee
