= Walnut Street Historic District =

Walnut Street Historic District may refer to:

in the United States

(by state)

- Walnut Street Historic District (Florence, Alabama), listed on the National Register of Historic Places (NRHP) in Lauderdale County, Alabama
- Walnut Street Historic District (Rogers, Arkansas), listed on the NRHP in Benton County, Arkansas
- South Walnut Street Historic District (Greensboro, Georgia), listed on the NRHP in Greene County, Georgia
- West Walnut Street Historic District, Carbondale, Illinois, listed on the NRHP in Jackson County, Illinois
- South Walnut Street Historic District (Edinburgh, Indiana), listed on the NRHP in Johnson County, Indiana
- Walnut Street Historic District (Muncie, Indiana), listed on the NRHP in Delaware County, Indiana
- Walnut Street Historic District (North Vernon, Indiana), listed on the NRHP in Jennings County, Indiana
- Walnut Street Historic District (Waterloo, Iowa), listed on the NRHP in Black Hawk County, Iowa
- Walnut Street Historic District (Springfield, Kentucky), listed on the NRHP in Washington County, Kentucky
- Walnut Street Historic District (Chaska, Minnesota), listed on the NRHP in Carver County, Minnesota
- Walnut Street Historic District (Augusta, Missouri), listed on the NRHP in St. Charles County, Missouri
- Walnut Street Warehouse and Commercial Historic District, Kansas City, Missouri, listed on the NRHP in Jackson County, Missouri
- Walnut Street Historic District (Springfield, Missouri), listed on the NRHP in Greene County, Missouri
- Walnut Street Commercial Historic District, Springfield, Missouri, listed on the NRHP in Greene County, Missouri
- West Walnut Street Commercial Historic District, Springfield, Missouri, listed on the NRHP in Greene County, Missouri
- Walnut Street Historic District (Oneonta, New York), listed on the NRHP in Otsego County, New York
