= Mobile and Ohio Railroad Depot =

Mobile and Ohio Railroad Depot may refer to:

- Mobile and Ohio Railroad Depot (Murphysboro, Illinois), listed on the National Register of Historic Places in Jackson County, Illinois
- Mobile and Ohio Railroad Depot (Aberdeen, Mississippi), listed on the National Register of Historic Places in Monroe County, Mississippi
