= Bruce Richmond =

Bruce Richmond may refer to:

- Bruce Lyttelton Richmond (1871–1964), British editor and journalist
- L. Bruce Richmond (1920–2008), American politician in the Illinois House of Representatives
