= Murphysboro Elks Lodge =

- U.S. National Register of Historic Places
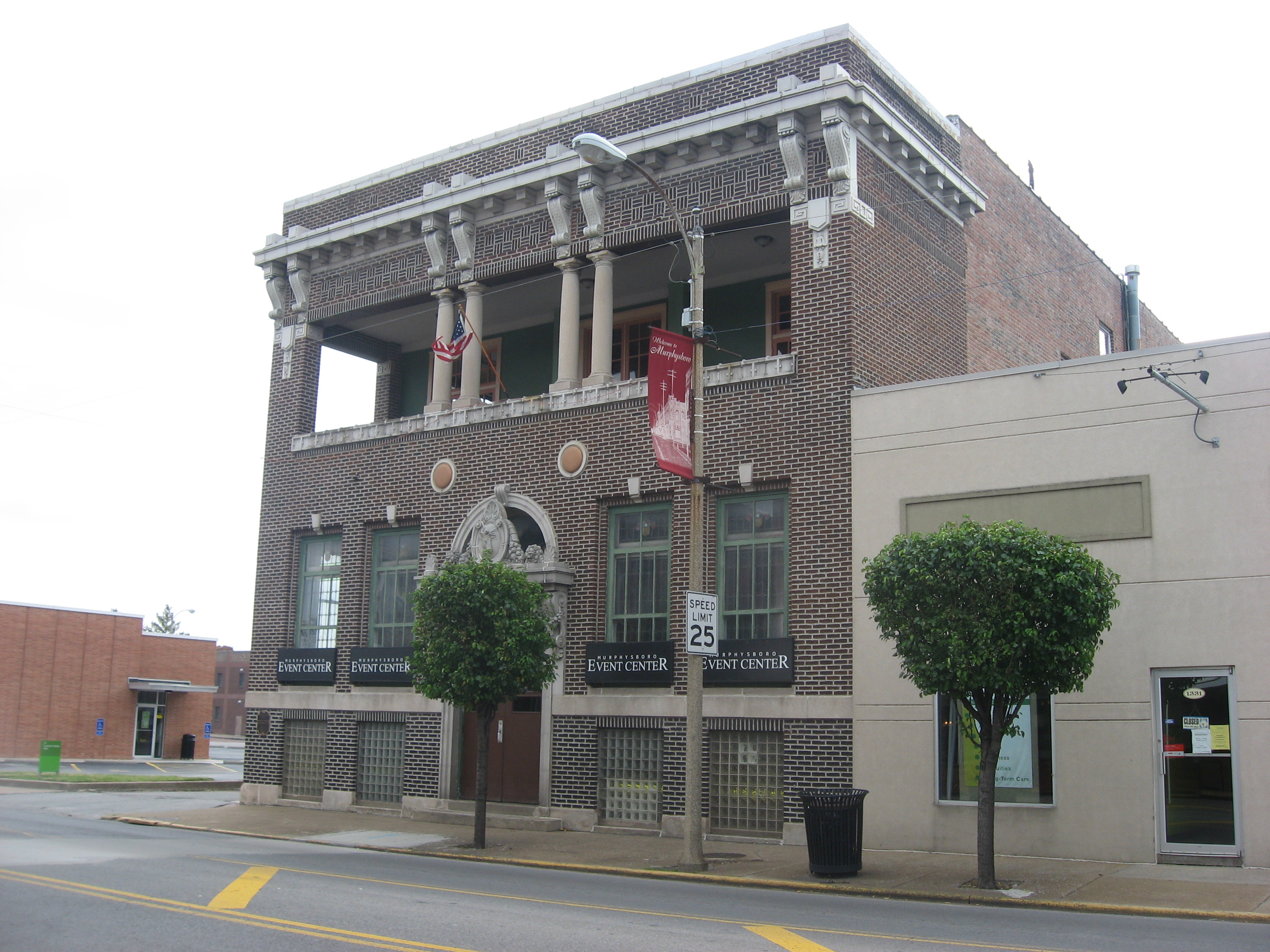
- Front and western side

- Location within Illinois Location within the United States
- Location: 1329 Walnut St., Murphysboro, Illinois
- Coordinates: 37°45′58″N 89°20′15″W
- Area: less than one acre
- Built: 1916
- Architect: Rudolph Zerse Gill
- Architectural style: Classical Revival
- NRHP reference No.: 05001255
- Added to NRHP: November 15, 2005

Murphysboro Elks Lodge, also known as Murphysboro Event Center, is a historic meeting hall and former Elks lodge in Murphysboro, Illinois. The lodge was built in 1916 for Murphysboro Elks Lodge No. 572, which was chartered in 1900. Architect Rudolph Zerse Gill designed the building in the Classical Revival style. The red brick building features a limestone foundation and terra cotta decorations. The front entrance is topped by an oval containing an elk head and decorated with fruit garlands. The second story features a porch supported by classical columns. A dentillated and bracketed entablature encircles the front half of the building above the porch.

The building was listed on the National Register of Historic Places in 2005.
