= R. G. Crisenberry =

American educator, newspaper editor, and politician

Robert Guy Crisenberry (September 29, 1882 – May 23, 1965) was an American educator, newspaper editor, businessman, and politician.

== Biography ==
Crisenberry was born in Henry County, Tennessee. He moved to Illinois in 1892. Crisenberry graduate from Creal Springs High School in Creal Springs, Illinois, and from Valparaiso University. He was a high school principal and teacher. He also the editor and publisher of the Williamson County News newspaper in Johnston City, Illinois. Crisenberry served as chief deputy sheriff from 1926 to 1930 for Jackson County, Illinois, and as United States District Court bailiff in East St. Louis, Illinois. He worked as a salesman and sales promotion engineer from 1917 to 1925. Crisenberry and his wife lived in Murphysboro, Illinois. Crisenberry serve in the Illinois House of Representatives from 1933 to 1937 and was a Republican. He then served in the Illinois Senate from 1937 until 1961. Crisenberry died at St. John's Hospital in Springfield, Illinois, from injuries he suffered in a fall at the Illinois State Capitol.
