= Mount Zion Lodge Masonic Temple =

- U.S. National Register of Historic Places
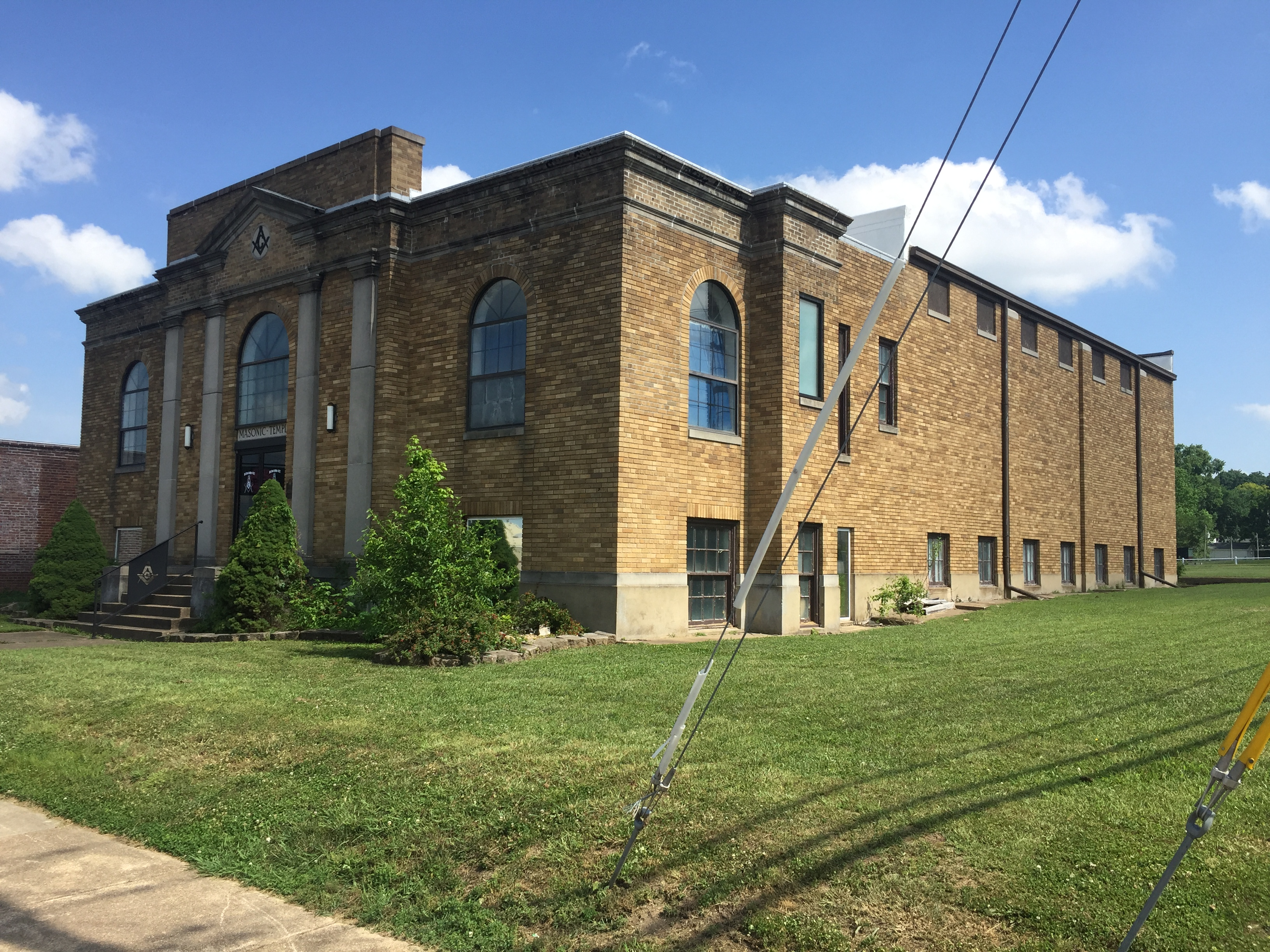
- Building in 2022

- Location within Missouri Location within the United States
- Location: 304 E. Main St., West Plains, Missouri.
- Coordinates: 36°43′41″N 91°51′1″W
- Built: 1933
- Architect: Rudolph Zerse Gill
- Architectural style: Classical Revival
- NRHP reference No.: 11000188
- Added to NRHP: April 15, 2011

Mount Zion Lodge Masonic Temple is a historic Masonic lodge building located at 304 E. Main St. in West Plains, Howell County, Missouri. It was designed by architect Rudolph Zerse Gill and built in 1933. The one-story building on a raised basement is an "austere" Classical Revival building with a projecting temple front with Tuscan order pilasters. It measures approximately 50 feet by 80 feet.

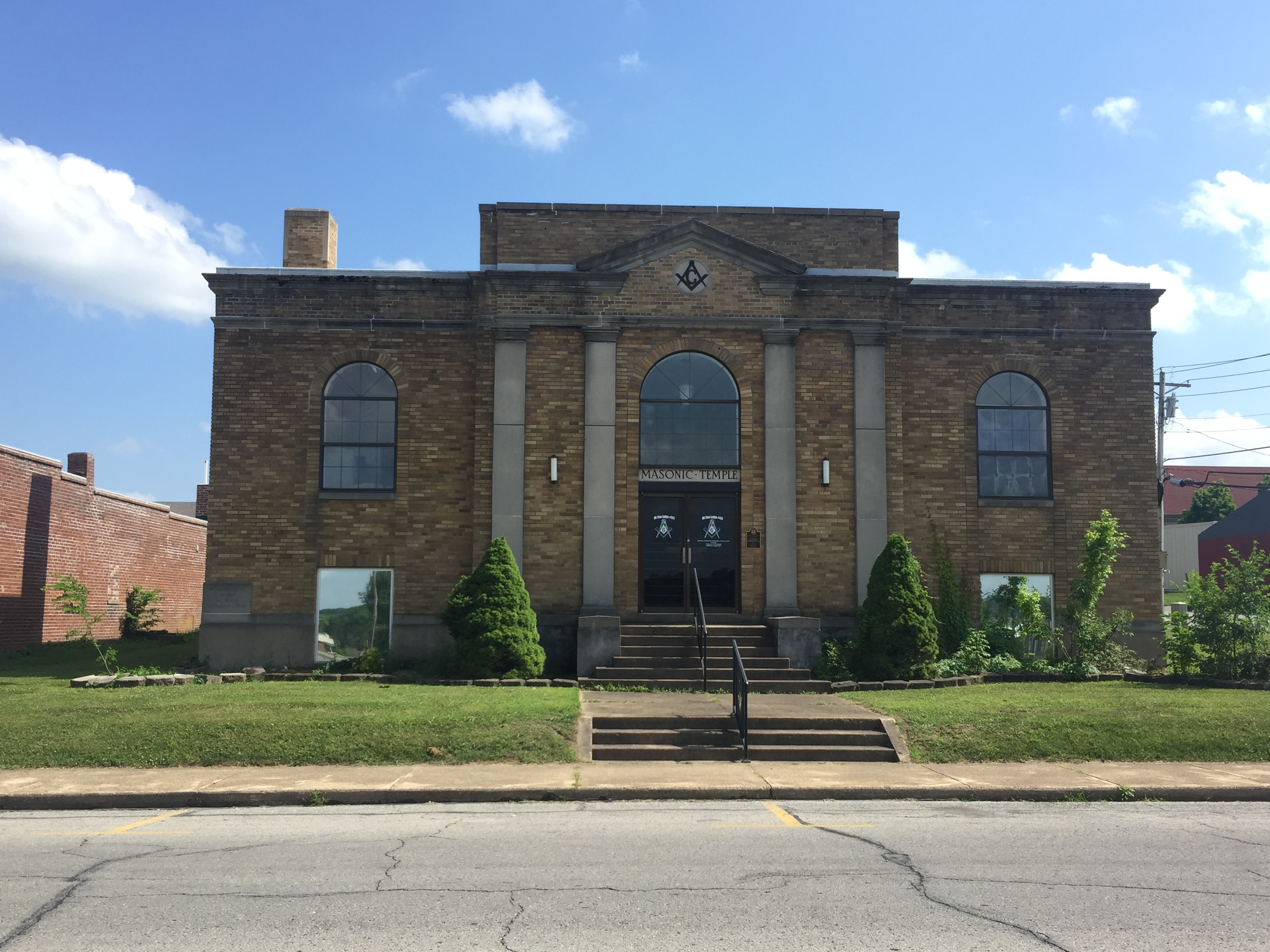
Front view, in 2022

It was listed on the National Register of Historic Places in 2011.

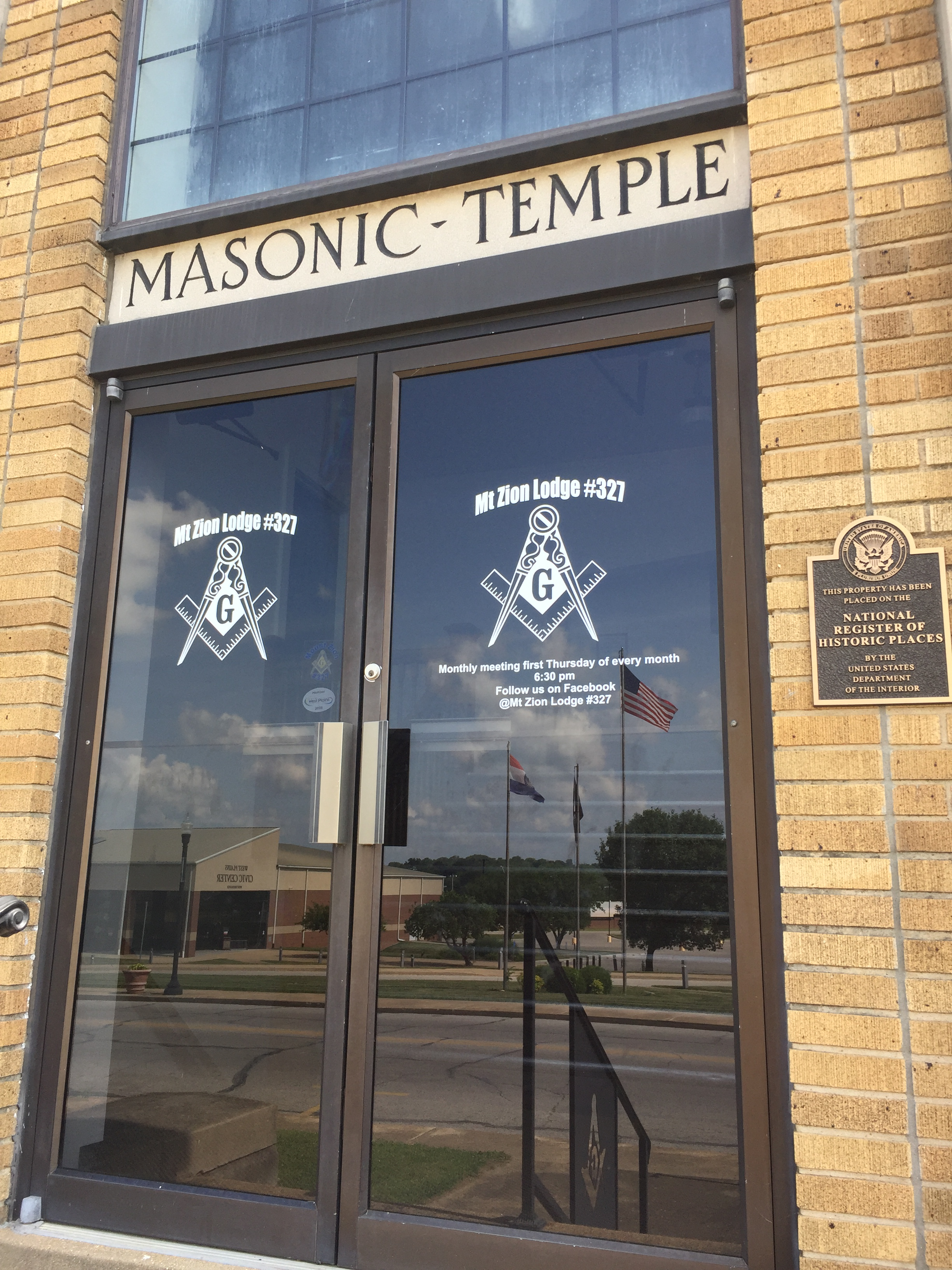
Mount Zion Lodge Masonic Temple front door
