= General John A. Logan Museum =

Museum for Civil War General John A Logan

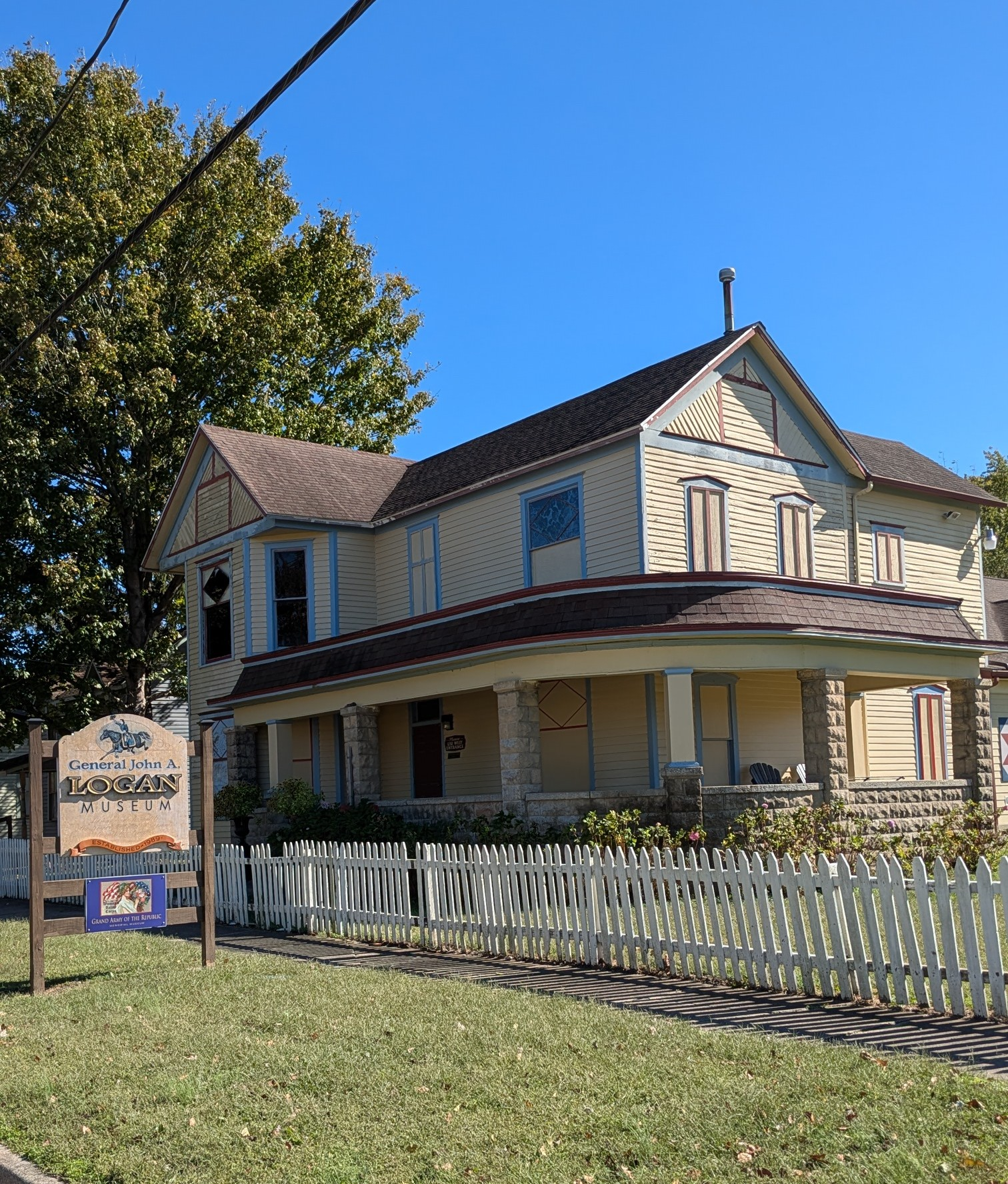
- Front entrance of the General John A. Logan Museum

- Location in Illinois
- Established: 1989
- Location: 1613 Edith St. Murphysboro, Illinois, United States
- Coordinates: 37.76227°N 89.34126°W
- Type: History museum
- Director: Laura Varner
- Website: loganmuseum.org

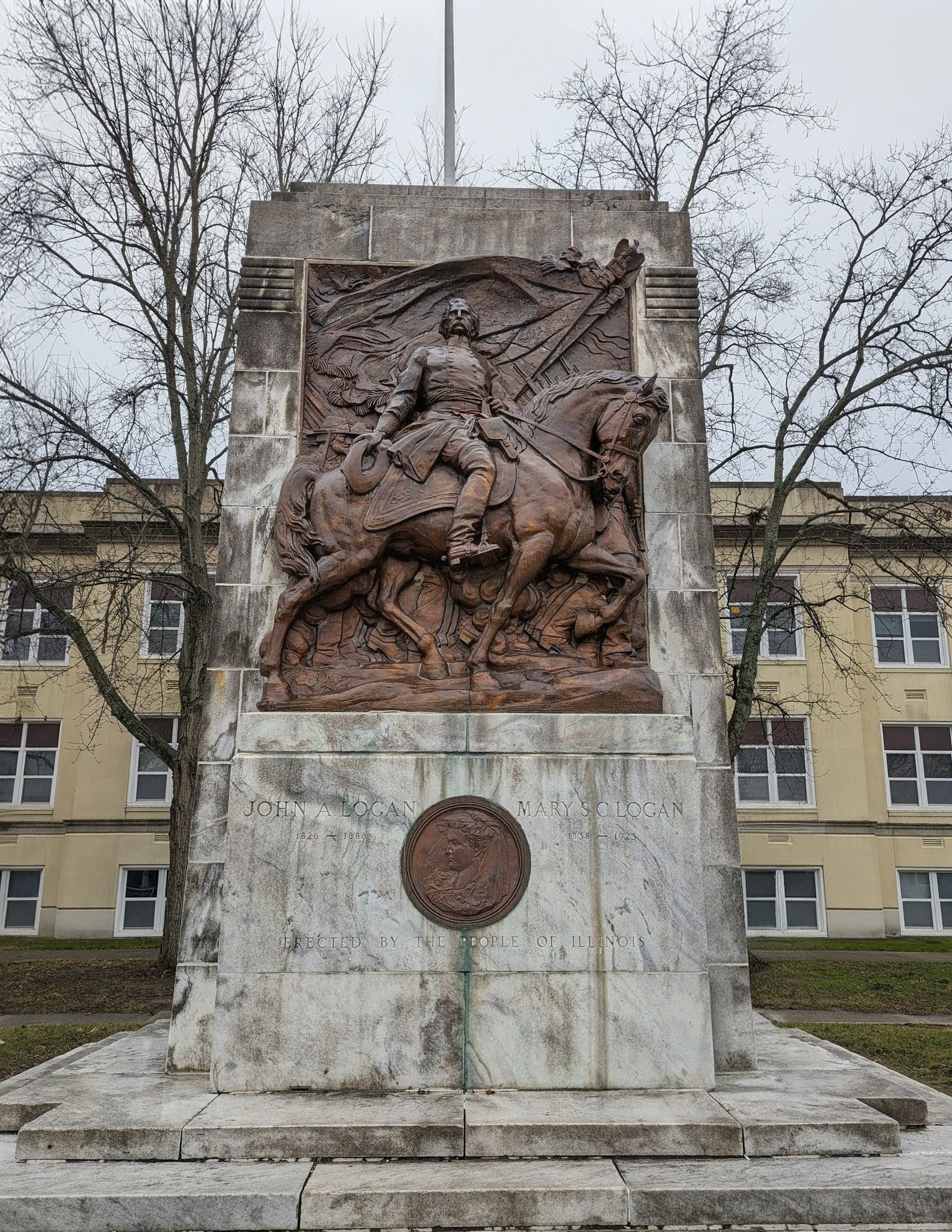
Gen. John A Logan statue at the nearby Murphysboro Middle School.

The General John A. Logan Museum located in Murphysboro, Illinois, is dedicated to the life and legacy of Union Civil War general and Memorial Day founder John A. Logan. Established in 1989 on or near the site of Logan's birthplace, the museum serves as a resource for local history, the Civil War, and 19th-century American politics.

The museum's collections and educational programs have been the subject of academic research; one study detailed its effective utilization of exhibits as a classroom tool for local students. The institution is also recognized by historical publications for its mission to guide visitors through Logan's significant career.

The museum was founded by Mike Jones, a Southern Illinois historian and Civil War enthusiast, to preserve Logan's legacy and to provide educational programs about the General. Jones served as the initial director until his passing in 2023.The museum's founding history was discussed by host Dean Klinkenberg. The current director and curator is Laura Varner.

Located in the historic Christopher C. Bullar House, adjacent to Logan's birthplace site, the museum began as a one-room exhibit.

In 2023, the National Woman's Relief Corps (WRC) historic collection, which was previously held in the Grand Army of the Republic (G.A.R.) Museum in Springfield, Illinois, was moved to the General John A. Logan Museum as a museum within a museum. This collection includes relics of the Civil War, highlighting the membership and work done by the Grand Army of the Republic and their auxiliary, the WRC.

An exhibit traces Logan's timeline from his boyhood in Murphysboro, through his Civil War service commanding the Army of the Tennessee, and later to his role as a U.S. Congressman. In 1868, as Commander-in-Chief of the Grand Army of the Republic, Logan issued General Order No. 11, establishing May 30 as Decoration Day — the precursor to Memorial Day.

The museum has been featured in regional tourism guides and historical media for its educational outreach and interpretive programming. The museum hosts numerous community programs, including a historical program on the history of slavery in Illinois.

== Selected collections and exhibits ==
The museum houses several historically significant items:

- Appomattox Drum: A Civil War-era drum believed to have been played during the surrender ceremony at Appomattox Court House in April 1865.
- Civil War Battle Flag: A regimental flag carried through major battles, part of the museum's WRC collection.
- SS General Lyon outdoor marker and labyrinth: A marker and memorial labyrinth commemorating the loss of the SS General Lyon and approximately 500 Union soldiers returning to Southern Illinois at the end of the Civil War. The labyrinth features a brick inscribed with each soldier's name, rank, unit, and home county.

== Structures and grounds ==
In addition to the Bullar House, the museum site includes the Sheley House, Hughes House, Dalton House, and the archaeological site of Logan's birthplace. The preserved home of Samuel H. Dalton, a formerly enslaved man who enlisted in the U.S. Navy in 1863, is also located on the site
