= Riverside Park Bandshell =

- U.S. National Register of Historic Places
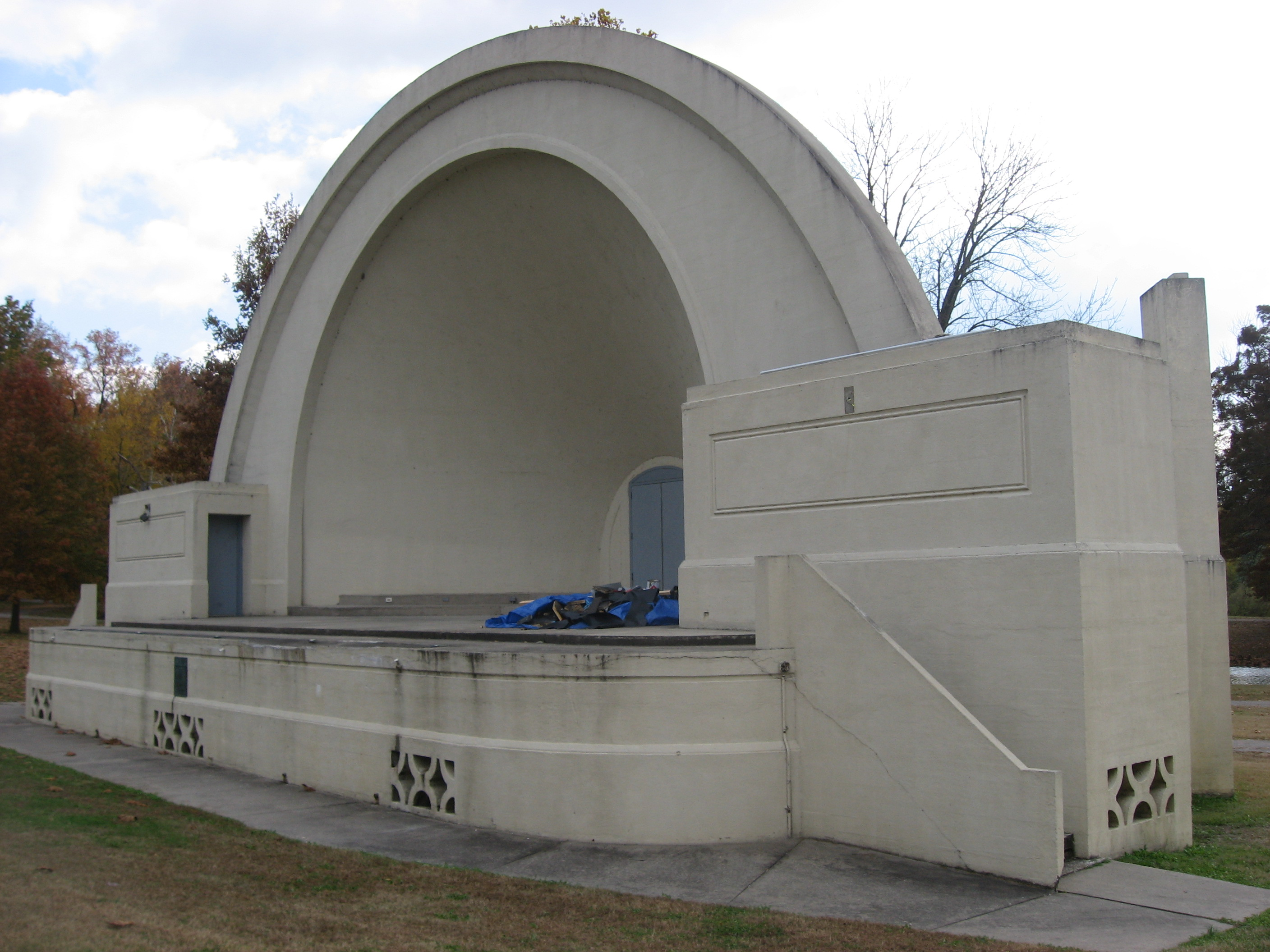

- Location within Illinois Location within the United States
- Location: 22nd and Commercial Sts., Murphysboro, Illinois
- Coordinates: 37°45′22″N 89°21′25″W
- Built: 1938–1939; 87 years ago
- Architect: Rudolph Zerses Gill
- NRHP reference No.: 12000323
- Added to NRHP: June 6, 2012

The Riverside Park Bandshell is a bandshell located in Riverside Park in Murphysboro, Illinois. The concrete bandshell was built in 1938–39 by the Works Progress Administration and the Murphysboro Park District. Riverside Park was opened in 1907; it was originally known as Buster Brown Park, as it was initially owned by the Brown Shoe Company. The park began hosting Murphysboro's annual 4th of July celebration in 1927, and the bandshell became part of the day's events as soon as it opened. The bandshell's inaugural concert occurred on July 4, 1939, and received an audience of 45,000; since then, the bandshell has hosted the opening concert for the celebrations each year. The bandshell has also hosted annual music festivals highlighting jazz, blues, and bluegrass musicians and provides a stage for other community events in the park.

The bandshell was added to the National Register of Historic Places on June 6, 2012.

It was designed by architect Rudolph Zerses Gill.
