= James Wolcott (pioneer) =

19th century Ohio entrepreneur

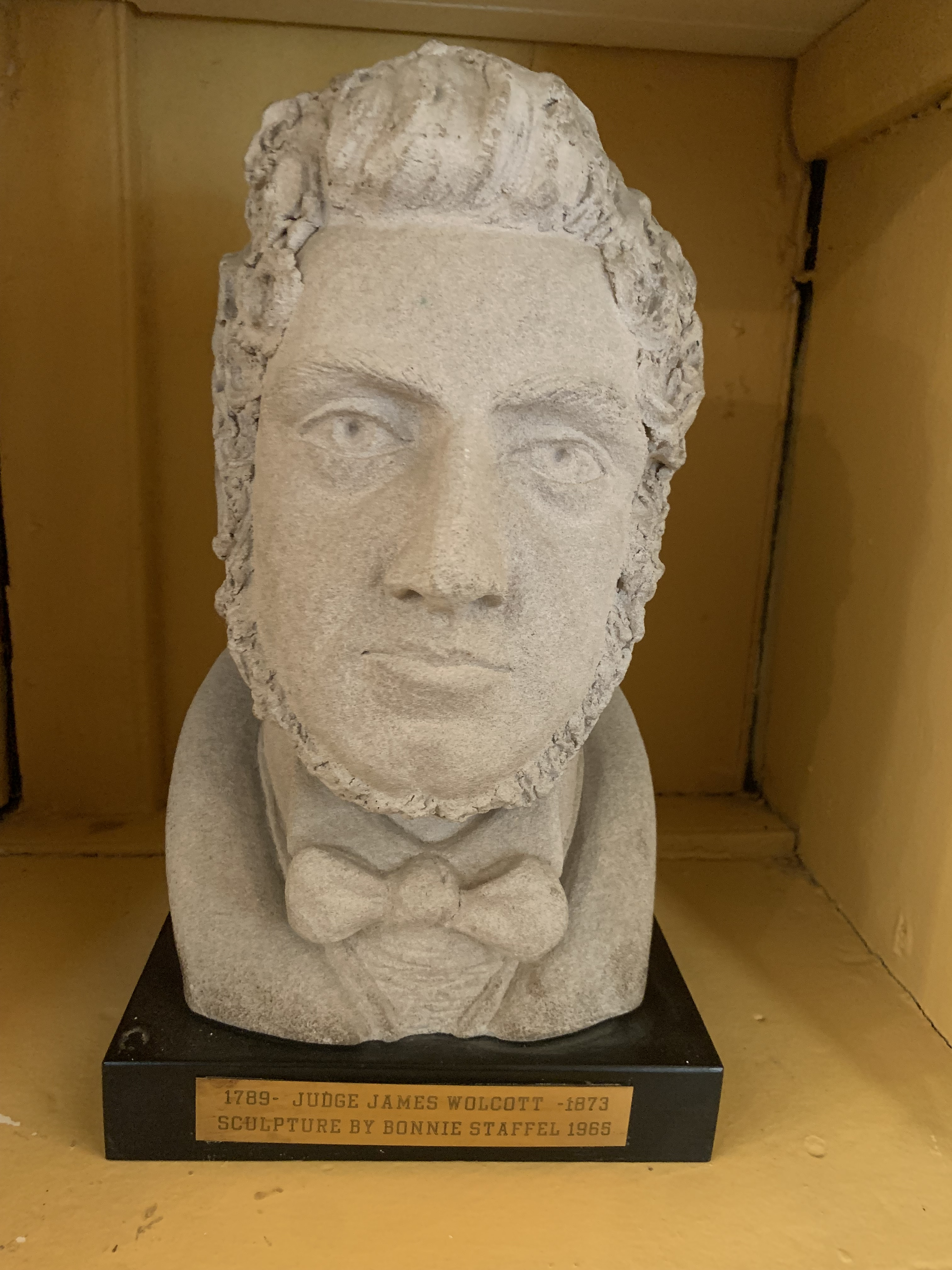
James Wolcott

James Wolcott (3 November 1789 – 5 January 1873) was an entrepreneur and civic leader of Maumee, Ohio. He played a role in the development of Maumee through his business and public service. He built the now Wolcott House Museum in Maumee, Ohio.

Wolcott, one of thirteen children born to Guy and Abigail Wolcott, was born in Torrington, Litchfield County, Connecticut, United States.

At a young age, Wolcott began working in woolen mills in search of fortune. He worked with his Uncle to construct and operate a woolen mill and later with Joseph H. Hughes of Delaware, Ohio. Wolcott continued his westward expansion into St. Louis, Missouri, in 1820. A year later, he married Mary Wells, daughter of William Wells and Sweet Breeze, thus granddaughter of Miami Chief Little Turtle.

The young couple settled in Willshire, where Wolcott established another mill. In 1823, he built a Willshire home for Mary and their two sons. However, in search of prosperity, Wolcott brought his family to Fort Wayne, Indiana and eventually to the shores of the Maumee River, settling in Maumee, Ohio, in 1826. Wolcott believed that the canals of Ohio would be a good venture with their new apparatus in the Maumee River Valley. The Ohio and Erie Canal had good prospects at the time. The family traveled by boat to Maumee and lived in a hotel until Wolcott purchased four river tracts and began work on the "Mansion on the River." The mansion is still standing today.

Wolcott invested heavily in river shipping via the Maumee River, transporting goods and passengers between Maumee, Detroit, Sandusky, and Buffalo. The heyday of his enterprise reigned from 1835 to 1850. He owned two ships; in 1840, he launched the General Harrison and the James Wolcott in 1843. Before that, he served as acting agent for shipping lines and profited from the Forwarding and Commissioning business, which helped other frontier families acquire goods. He built a water-powered mill below the house on the Maumee River.

In 1838, James Wolcott was elected the first president of the Maumee Council. He was elected associate judge of the Lucas County Common Pleas court. His shipping business expanded during the 1830s and 1840s and helped launch Wolcott further into the local political scene. In 1843, he served as mayor of Maumee. Wolcott was one of the individuals who helped assign Maumee as the county seat, as they believed in its long-term prosperity with river trade. Wolcott's effort helped construct a courthouse and county buildings within Maumee. In 1837, Wolcott donated a lot to St. Paul's Episcopal Church in Maumee, where his family worshiped and eventually willed the mansion after the death of Rilla Hull in 1957, final member of the family to reside in the Wolcott House.

James Wolcott's political career expanded into his aid in founding the Lucas County Whig Party. Wolcott greatly supported Henry Clay, a whig, and named his fourth-born son after him. Serving as chairman of the Lucas County Whig party and traveling as a delegate to the state convention supporting Clay, Wolcott was disappointed when his wife's father's war comrade, William Henry Harrison, was chosen for the presidential nomination instead.

In 1843, at 43, Mary Wells Wolcott died in February. James Wolcott married Caroline B. Davis in November of the following year. Mary Ann Wolcott, the daughter of James and Mary, took the lead of the household in the interim after her mother's death and after the divorce of James and Caroline.

By about 1850, the decline of canal traffic and the rise of railroads reduced the profitability of his shipping ventures. Following the decline of his shipping business, Wolcott turned to farming, raising chickens, hogs, and cattle while cultivating corn, wheat, flax, peaches, and apples. The sharp turn from canals to railroads left Wolcott with little but his estate and family.

James Wolcott died on 5 January 1873.

== Legacy ==
The Wolcott Heritage Center is located in Maumee, Ohio. Today, it offers tours interpreting the history of the Wolcott family and other historic buildings on the property.

The family home passed through four generations. Namely through the women of the family until the death of Rilla Hull in 1957. The house was entitled to St. Paul's Episcopal Church and ownership was later transferred to the city of Maumee. In 1970, the house was nominated to the National Register of Historic Places
