= Cornelius Hennessy Building =

- Hennessy, Cornelius, Building
- U.S. National Register of Historic Places
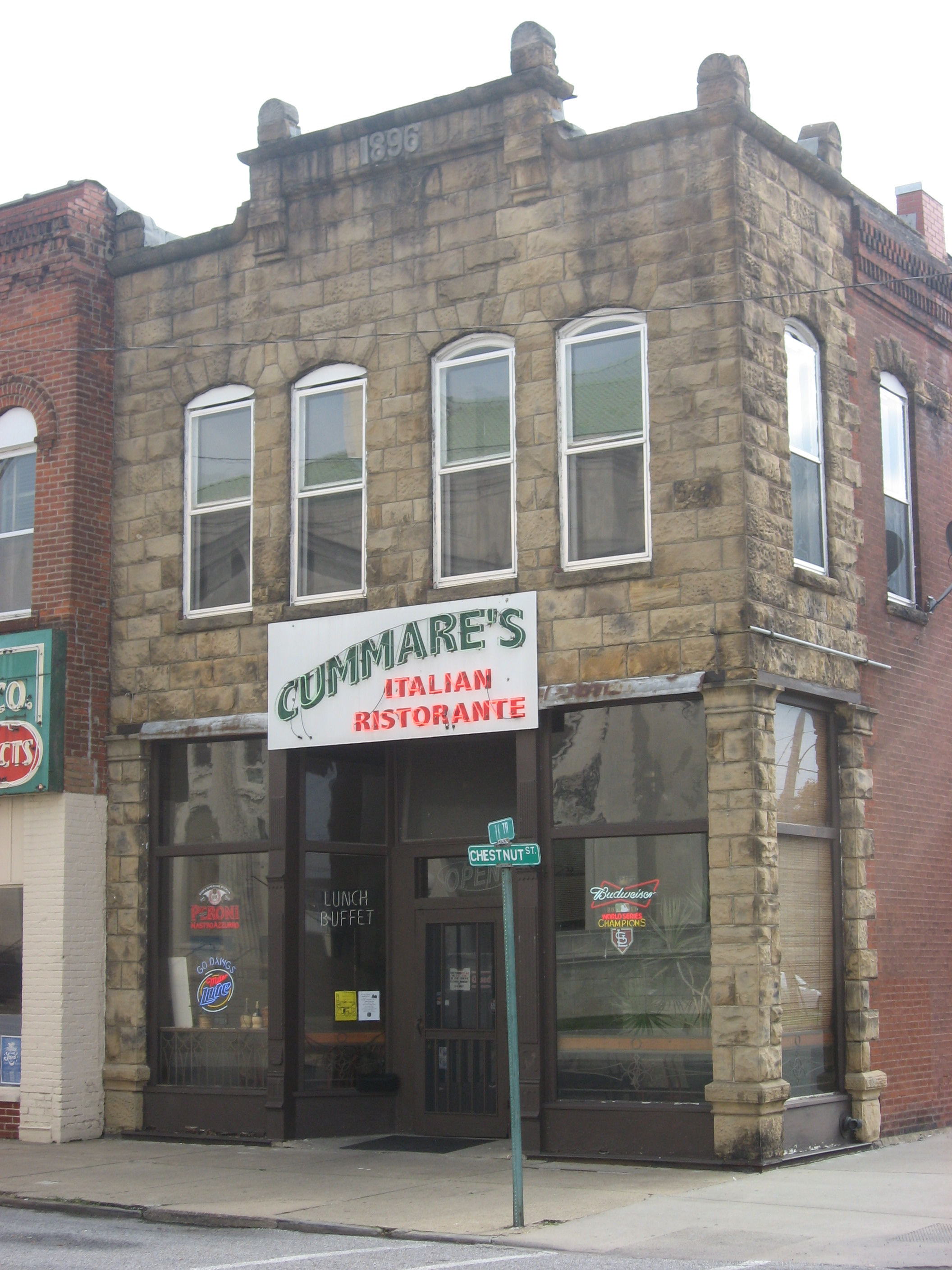

- Location within Illinois Location within the United States
- Location: 1023 Chestnut St., Murphysboro, Illinois
- Coordinates: 37°45′48″N 89°20′7″W
- Area: less than one acre
- Built: 1896
- Architectural style: Romanesque
- NRHP reference No.: 00001331
- Added to NRHP: November 8, 2000

The Cornelius Hennessy Building is a historic commercial building located at 1023 Chestnut St. in Murphysboro, Illinois. The building was constructed in 1896 for merchant Cornelius Hennessy, who operated a grocery store in the building. The two-story Richardsonian Romanesque building uses rough cut, locally quarried sandstone for its front facade; the remainder of the building was built with brick. A square parapet wall tops the building; the wall features four pinnacles and "1896" engraved in the middle. The first floor of the building has a cast iron storefront made by the local J. W. Lewis Foundry and Machine Shop.

The building was added to the National Register of Historic Places on November 8, 2000.
