= Warren Hull House =

Historic house in New York, United States

- U.S. National Register of Historic Places
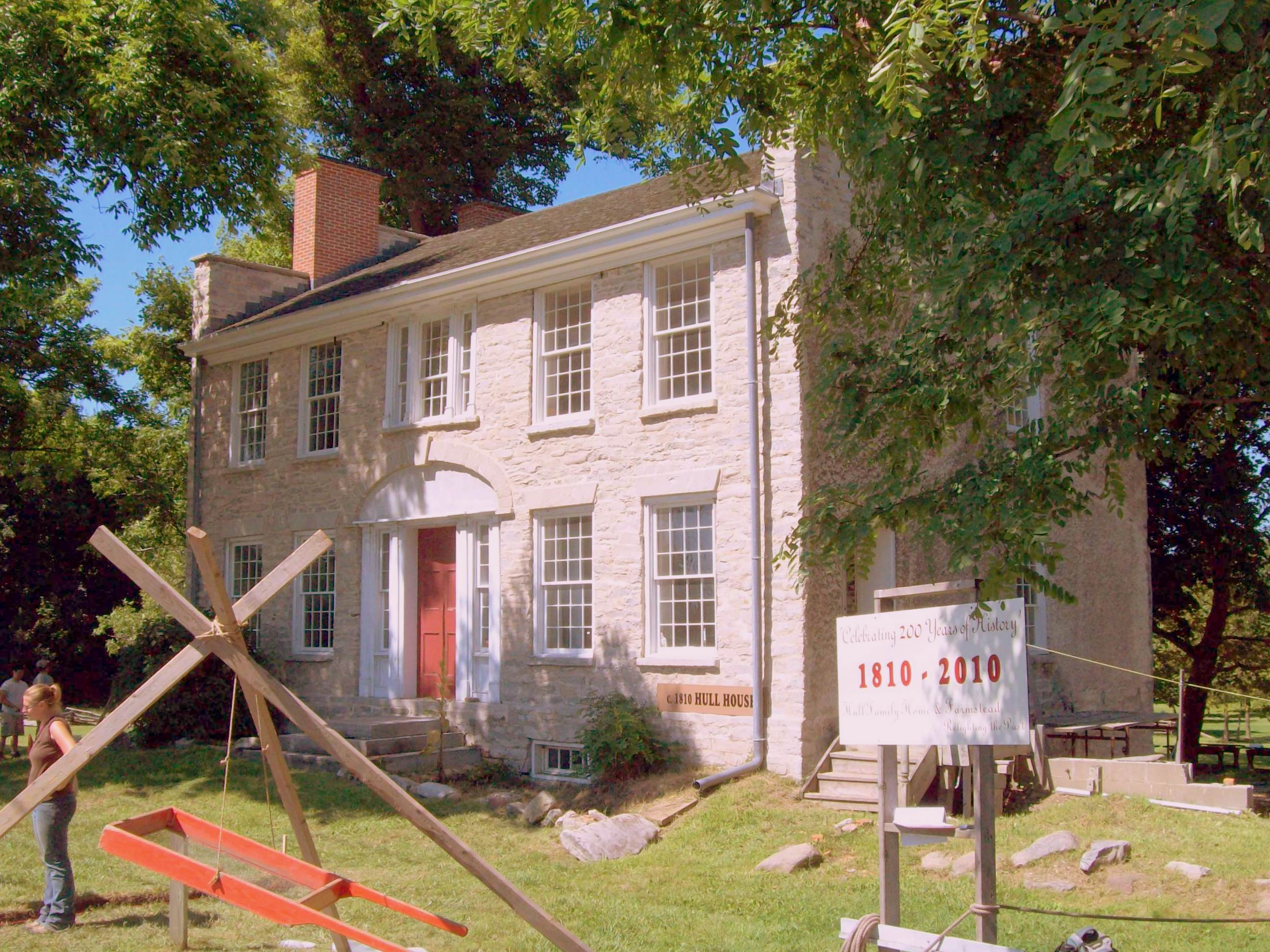
- Warren Hull House, August 2010

- Location within New York Location within the United States
- Location: 5976 Genesee St., Lancaster, New York
- Coordinates: 42°56′44″N 78°37′23″W
- Built: 1810
- Architectural style: Late Victorian, Federal
- NRHP reference No.: 92000456
- Added to NRHP: May 11, 1992

Warren Hull House is a historic home located at Lancaster in Erie County, New York. It was built about 1810 by Warren Hull, one of Erie County's earliest pioneers. It is in the Federal style and includes the family burial plot in the rear of the property. It is the oldest stone house in western New York and is currently owned by the Hull Family home association.

It was listed on the National Register of Historic Places in 1992.

The Hull House has scheduled Open House days during the spring, summer, and fall. An appointment can be made at the website, hullfamilyhome.org, for a group tour.

== History ==
Over 200 years ago, Warren and Polly Hull traveled west from Killingworth, Connecticut through New York State. They settled, temporarily, in four different counties in New York State until eventually deciding to settle and build their permanent home on what is now known as Genesee Street. That road terminated in the east at what was then known as the Batavia Road. The land for their home and farm was purchased from the Holland Land Company and was then in the Town of Clarence, and what is now in the Town of Lancaster, which was established in 1831.

The Home was built around 1810 and was one of a few stone homes in the area as a majority were made of wood. One example in the Gipple Cabin which is one of the oldest wooden cabins in the area and is currently on the property after being moved in 2013. The property went through many owners and was only owned by the Hull family until the mid to late 1800s. It went through many owners most notably the Wolfs and the Petersons. During the 1950s while owned by Frank Wolf, much of the property was lost due to the construction of the New York Thruway which cut the property in half. However, much of the property had been sold off in the past as well. Beginning in the late 1900s, the property began its major deterioration due to frequent yard sales and use of the property as a sort of junk yard by Mr. Peterson.

When the Hull Family Home Foundation began its work in 1992, the property was full of junk and much of the house and barn was deteriorating. However, due to their hard work, the home began to return and now can be visited as a historical site. In the future, the foundation plans on rebuilding the property into an early 19th-century farmstead with outhouses, etc.

== The Hull Family ==
Warren Hull (1762–1838) married Polly Gillett (1765–1834) in 1783 in Killingworth, Connecticut. Prior to his marriage, Warren served in the Revolutionary War with his father, Peter. Before settling in Western New York, Warren and Polly lived in Otsego County, Madison County, Ontario County, and Livingston County. Their family grew as they moved westward; when they purchased their property from the Holland Land Company in 1804, they already had ten children.

It is difficult to imagine how this family survived in this virtual wilderness in 1804. Warren and Polly appear to have been intelligent and well-educated, and they were obviously able to take advantage of whatever resources were available to them. They worked their farm and were able to take grain and wood to nearby mills. It is safe to assume that Polly taught her children until the nearest schoolhouse was built on the corner of Gunnville Road.

After the death of Warren and Polly, their daughter Polly Hull Lewis lived in the family home; she had six children and had been widowed in 1830. Rebecca married a man named William Tyler, who bought land adjoining the Hull property. James married Betsy Crosby, and they settled in Fredonia/Chautauqua area with their five children where he was a newspaper publisher. Anna Hull Tyler had one child and was widowed; and Maria Hull married Ezra Sheldon, whose family owned land east of the Hull property. Edmund Hull married Eliza Garrett, had six children, and was a lawyer who represented Erie County as a legislator in Albany. Justus Hull, a brick maker, married Harriet Bivens, had seven children and lived in Buffalo.

Sophia married Eber Howe, a printer/publisher; they moved to Ohio where they demonstrated their commitment to the abolitionist movement. Miranda Hull married her sister Vilera's widower, William Conley, after Vilera's death in 1835; she raised her own son and Vilera's two children on property across the road from the Hull house. Vilera is buried in the family cemetery with her parents. Minerva Hull died at age 26, unmarried and childless, while Aurilla married twice and had seven children in all. Aurilla, with her second husband, Robert Wheelock, purchased the Hull house from her sister, Polly, in 1849. Several Wheelock family members are buried in the Hull Family Cemetery. Most of the Hull children lived and died in the Lancaster area. However, their offspring were part of the westward movement, and many of them settled in Ohio, Indiana, Illinois, and Wisconsin.

- Polly: 1786–1863
- Rebecca: 1788–1871
- James: 1789–1867
- Anna: 1791–1851
- Maria: 1793–?
- Edmund: 1795–1852
- Justus: 1797–1863
- Sophia: 1799–1866
- Miranda: 1802–?
- Minerva: 1804–1830
- Aurilla: 1805–1898
- Vilera: 1808–1835
