= Reef House =

Historic house in Illinois, United States

- U.S. National Register of Historic Places
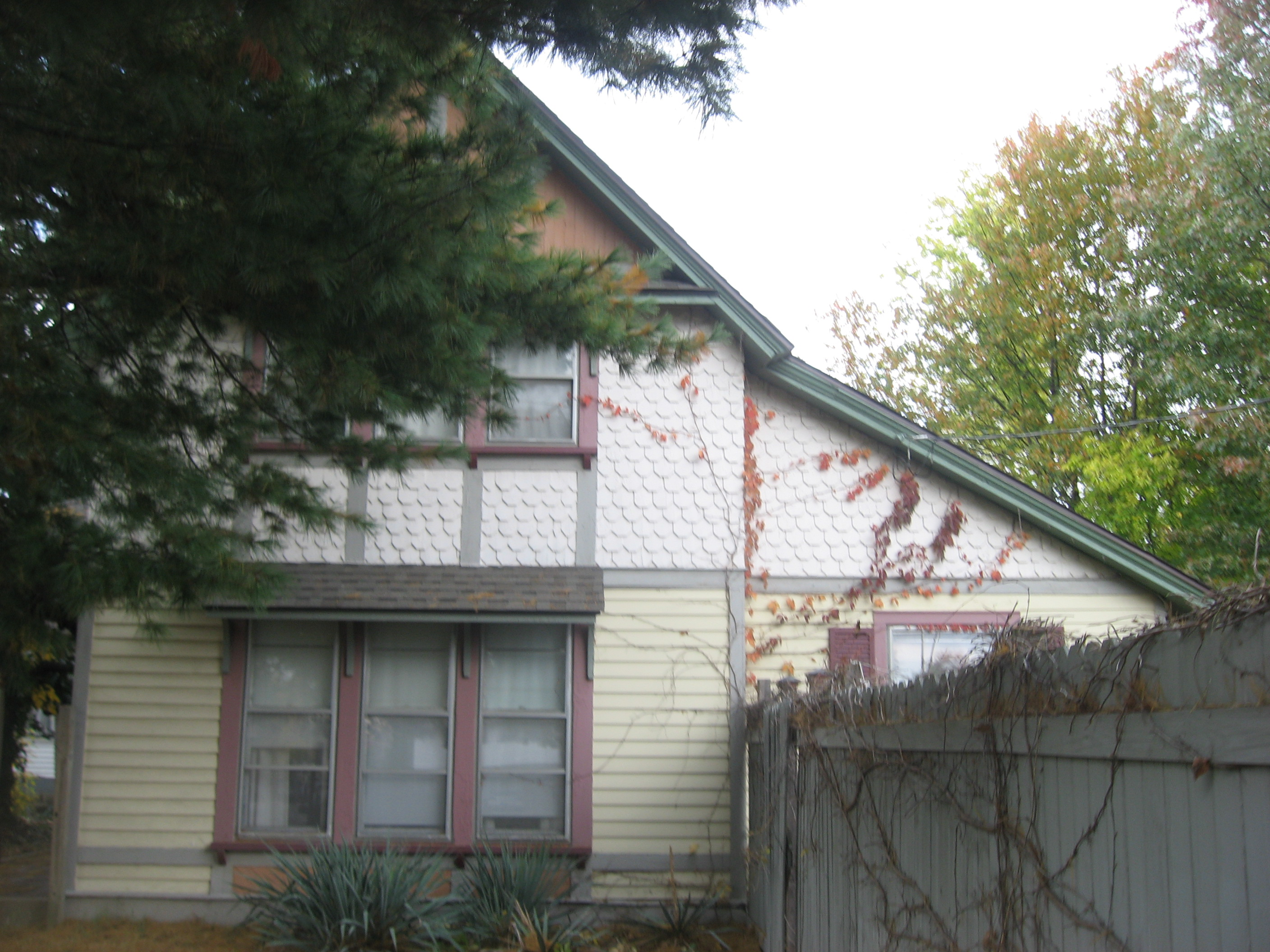
- The south side of the house

- Location within Illinois Location within the United States
- Location: 411 S. Poplar St., Carbondale, Illinois
- Coordinates: 37°43′23″N 89°13′17″W
- Area: less than one acre
- Built: c. 1892
- Architectural style: Queen Anne
- NRHP reference No.: 85002839
- Added to NRHP: November 14, 1985

The Reef House is a historic house located at 411 S. Poplar St. in Carbondale, Illinois. William A. Reef built the house for his family circa 1892. The Queen Anne-style cottage may have been designed by local carpenter A. M. Etherton, though records of its designer do not exist. The house features fishscale shingle siding on its second floor and clapboard siding on its first; the clapboard siding is adorned with stickwork. A gable on the south side of the house features half-timbering at its top. The house's front porch features turned posts, a typical Queen Anne feature. The house is one of the only Queen Anne homes in Carbondale which largely retains its original condition.

The house was added to the National Register of Historic Places on November 14, 1985.
