= L. Bruce Richmond =

American businessman and politician

Member of the Illinois House of Representatives
- In office 1975–1993

Personal details
- Born: October 17, 1920 Johnston City, Illinois, U.S.
- Died: April 13, 2008 (aged 87) Murphysboro, Illinois, U.S.
- Party: Democratic
- Education: Southern Illinois University
- Occupation: Politician, businessman

Military service
- Allegiance: United States
- Branch/service: United States Navy
- Battles/wars: World War II

L. Bruce Richmond (October 17, 1920 – April 13, 2008) was an American businessman and politician.

Richmond was born in Johnston City, Illinois. He served in the United States Navy during World War II. Richmond studied at Southern Illinois University. He lived in Murphysboro, Illinois, and he was the owner of the Aircraft Sign Service in Murphysboro, Illinois. Richmond served on the Murphysboro City Council and as mayor of Murpheysboro. Richmond served in the Illinois House of Representatives from 1975 until 1993 and was a Democrat. Richmond died at his home in Murphysboro, Illinois.
