= Rudolph Zerses Gill =

American architect and builder (1866–1951)

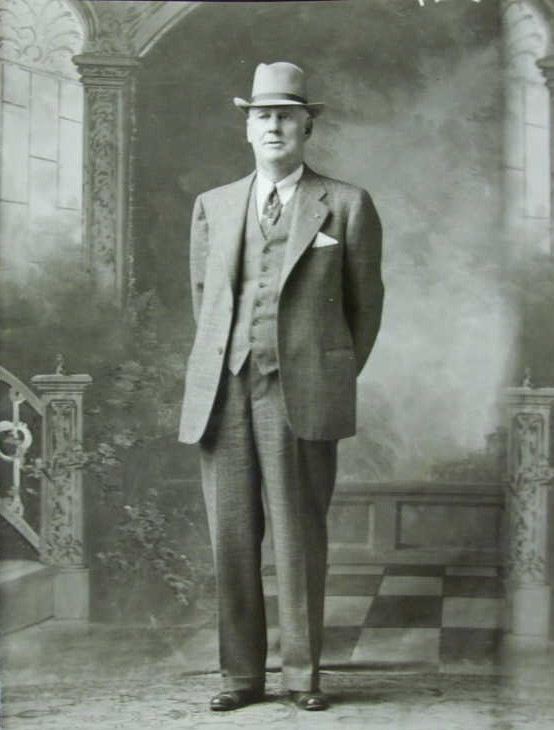
- Born: 1866
- Died: 1951 (aged 84–85)
- Other names: Ruolph Zerse Gill; RZ Gill; Doll Gill; Pop Gill
- Occupation: Architect

Rudolph Zerses Gill (or Ruolph Zerse Gill, RZ Gill and Doll Gill; 1866–1951) was an American architect and builder of the classical revival style that has designed several municipal buildings, club halls, and private residences in Illinois, Missouri, Kentucky and Tennessee. A few have been nominated to the National Register of Historic Places (NRHP).

R.Z. Gill graduated with a degree in architecture from the University of Illinois in 1887.

Works include:

- the Lindley House (1895), Urbana, Illinois
- the Franklin County Jail (1905–06), Benton, Illinois,
- the Murphysboro Elks Lodge (1916), Murphysboro, Illinois, NRHP-listed
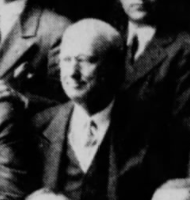
- the Barth and Walker Building (1916), Murphysboro, Illinois,
- the West Frankfort Elks Lodge (1923) West Frankfort, IL
- the VanCloostere Building (1925), Murphysboro, Illinois,
- the Mount Zion Lodge Masonic Temple (1933), West Plains, Missouri, NRHP-listed
- the Riverside Park Bandshell (1939), Murphysboro, Illinois, NRHP-listed.

Murphysboro Masonic Lodge # 498 Gill designed the Lodge and was also a member. Source: Carbondale Free Press Nov 6, 1919
