= Hull–Wolcott House =

Historic house in Ohio, United States

- U.S. National Register of Historic Places
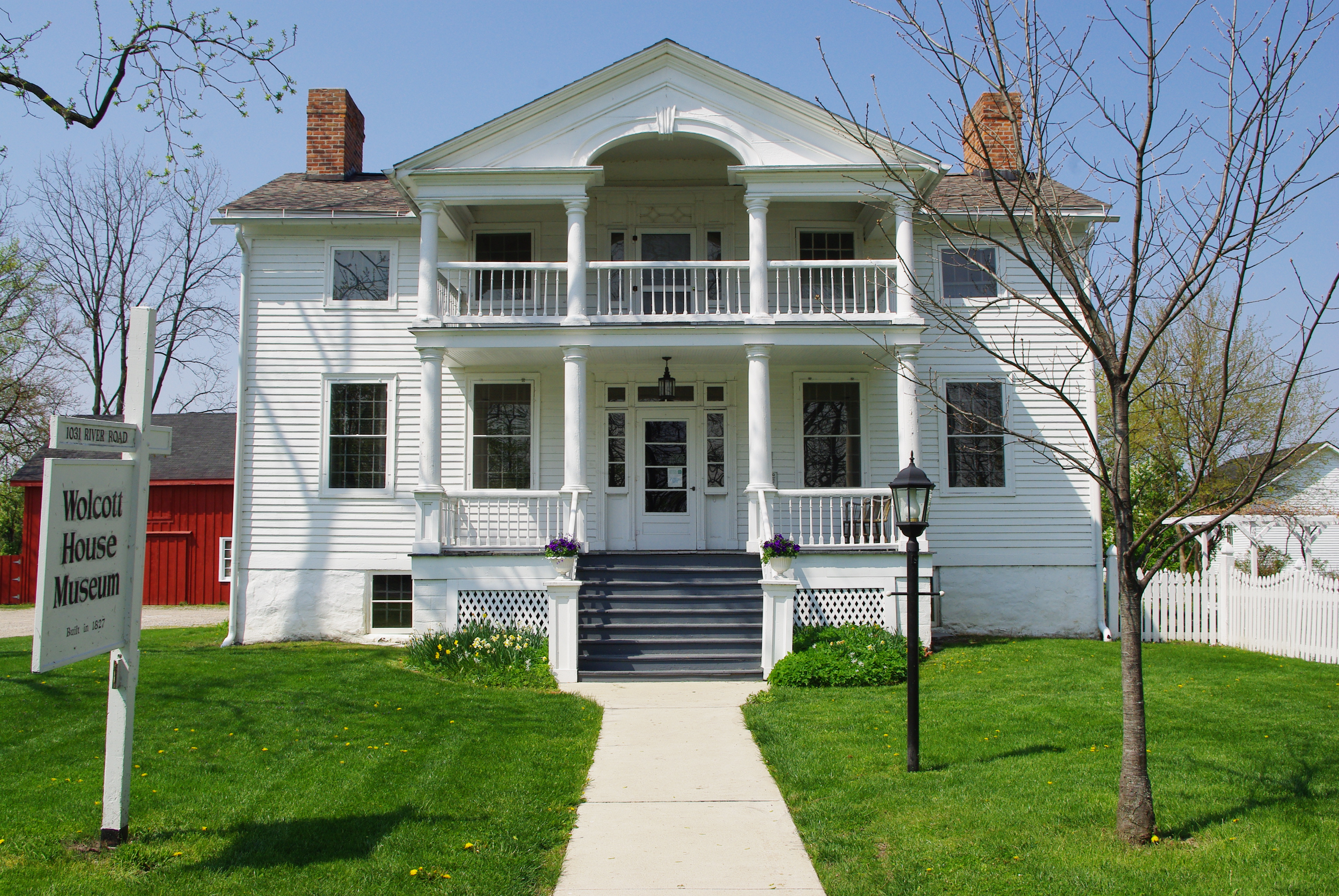
- Front of the house

- Location within Ohio Location within the United States
- Interactive map showing the location of Hull-Wolcott House
- Location: 1031 River Road; Maumee, Ohio
- Coordinates: 41°34′20″N 83°38′21″W
- Area: 1 acre (0.40 ha)
- Built: 1827
- Architect: James A. Wolcott
- Architectural style: Federal
- NRHP reference No.: 70000506
- Added to NRHP: January 26, 1970

The Hull–Wolcott House is a historic building in Maumee, Ohio.

Named for James Wolcott, a businessman in the late 1820s to the mid-1840s, only the Wolcott House is original to the site. Built by James Wolcott and his wife, Mary Wells, the Wolcott House began as a log house and evolved into a 14-room Federal-style mansion between 1827 and 1836. The house is a blend of federal and classic architecture.

In 1826, James Wolcott and his Mary moved to Maumee. They purchased 300 acres for $1.25 an acre in 1827 and began construction of their home. Wolcott built wharves and warehouses on the Maumee River and constructed two steamships to transport his merchandise. .

James and Mary Wolcott had five sons and a daughter. The house passed through three generations to Wolcott's great-granddaughter, Rilla Hull, who was the last of the Wolcott line to reside in the "Mansion on the Maumee". Upon her death in 1957, Hull bequeathed her home for public use and benefit. St. Paul's Episcopal Church transferred the landmark to the City of Maumee for use as a historical museum.

Home Ownership: James and Mary Wolcott – b.1789 to d.1873, Mary Ann Wolcott Gilbert – b.1827 to d.1891, Fredrica Gilbert Hull – b.1850 to d.1934, and Rilla E. Hull – b.1880 to d.1957.

== Wolcott House Museum Complex ==
Today, the Hull–Wolcott House is part of the Wolcott House Museum Complex, which is run by the Maumee Valley Historical Society. The complex consists of the following structures:

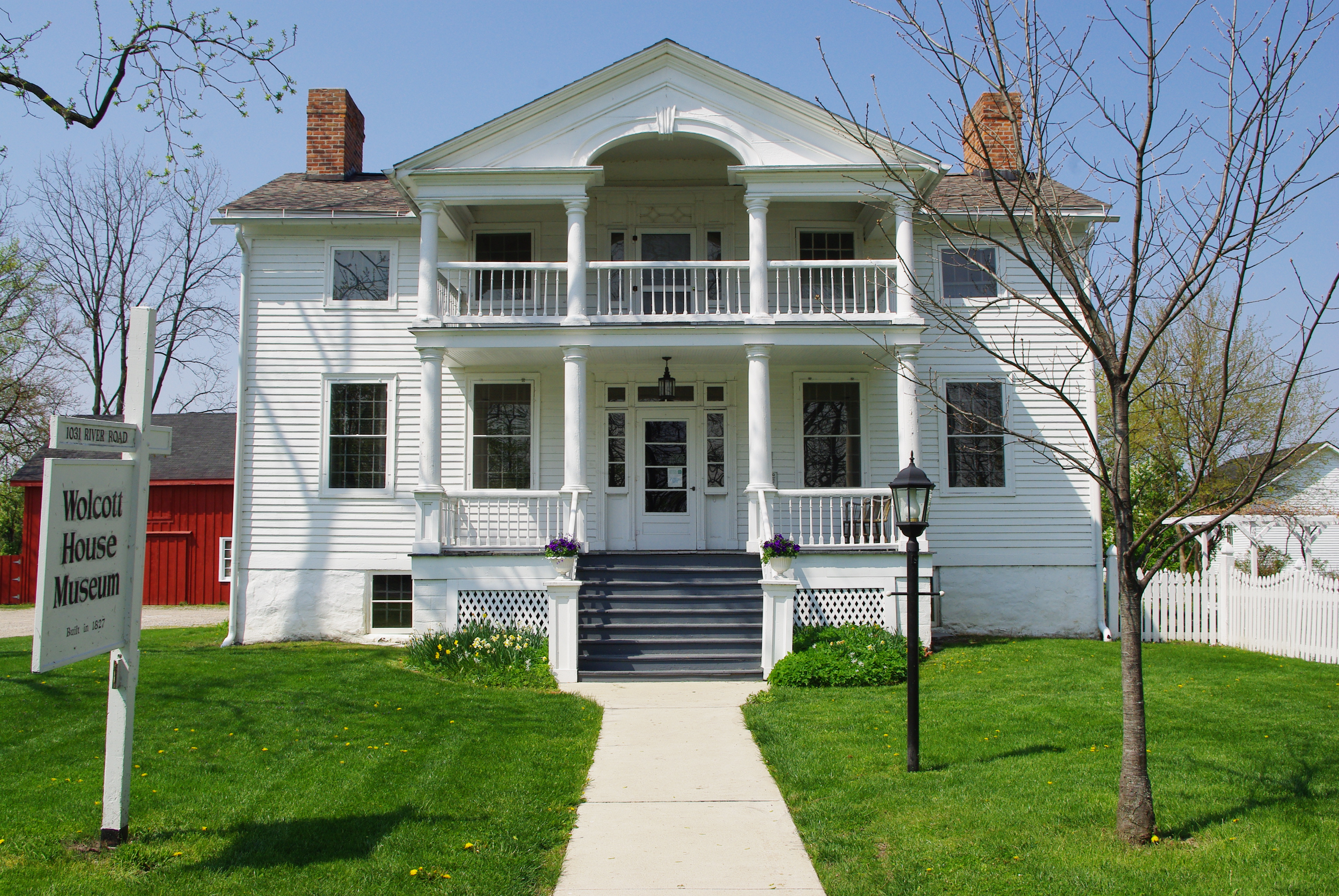
The Hull–Wolcott House

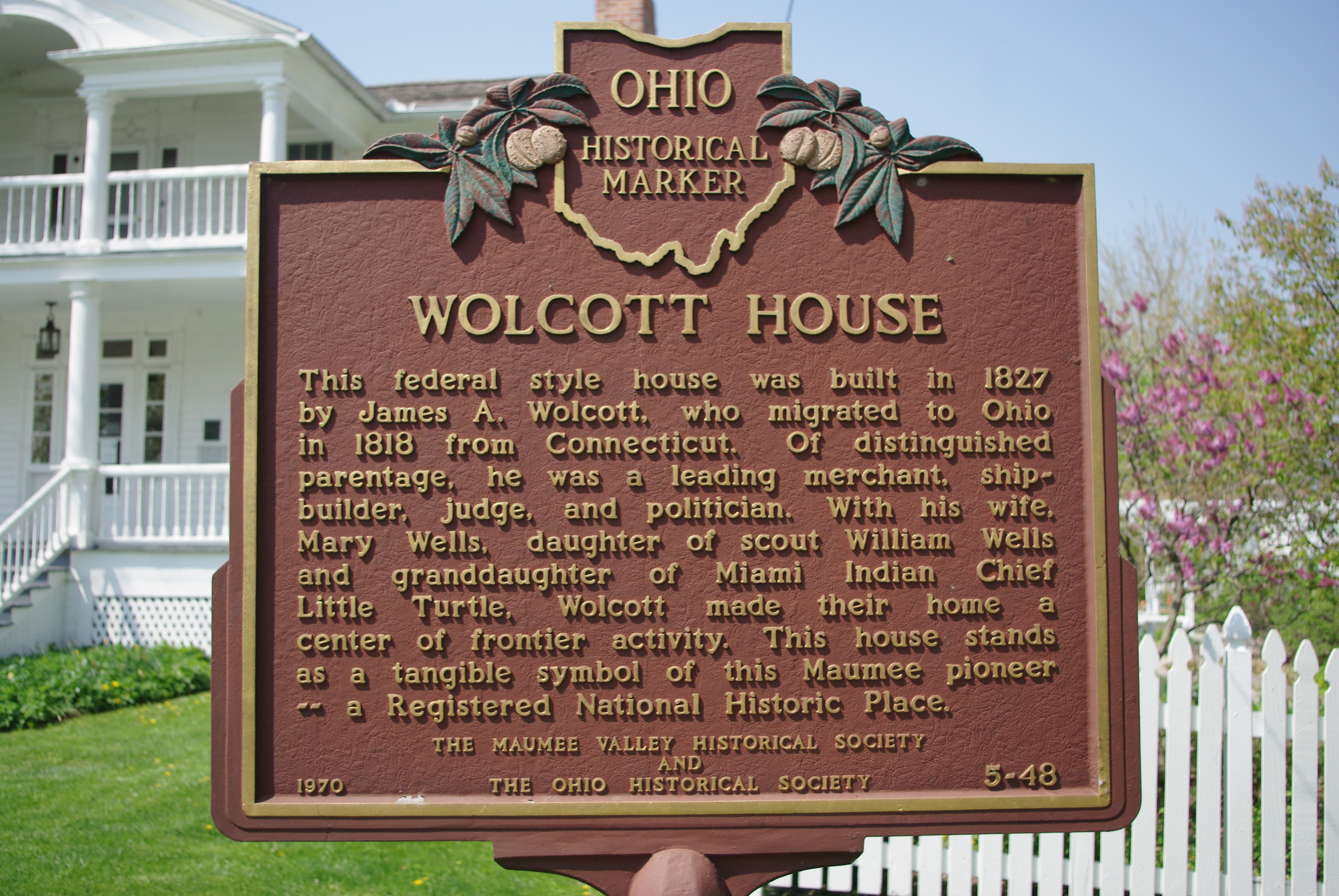
Description of the site

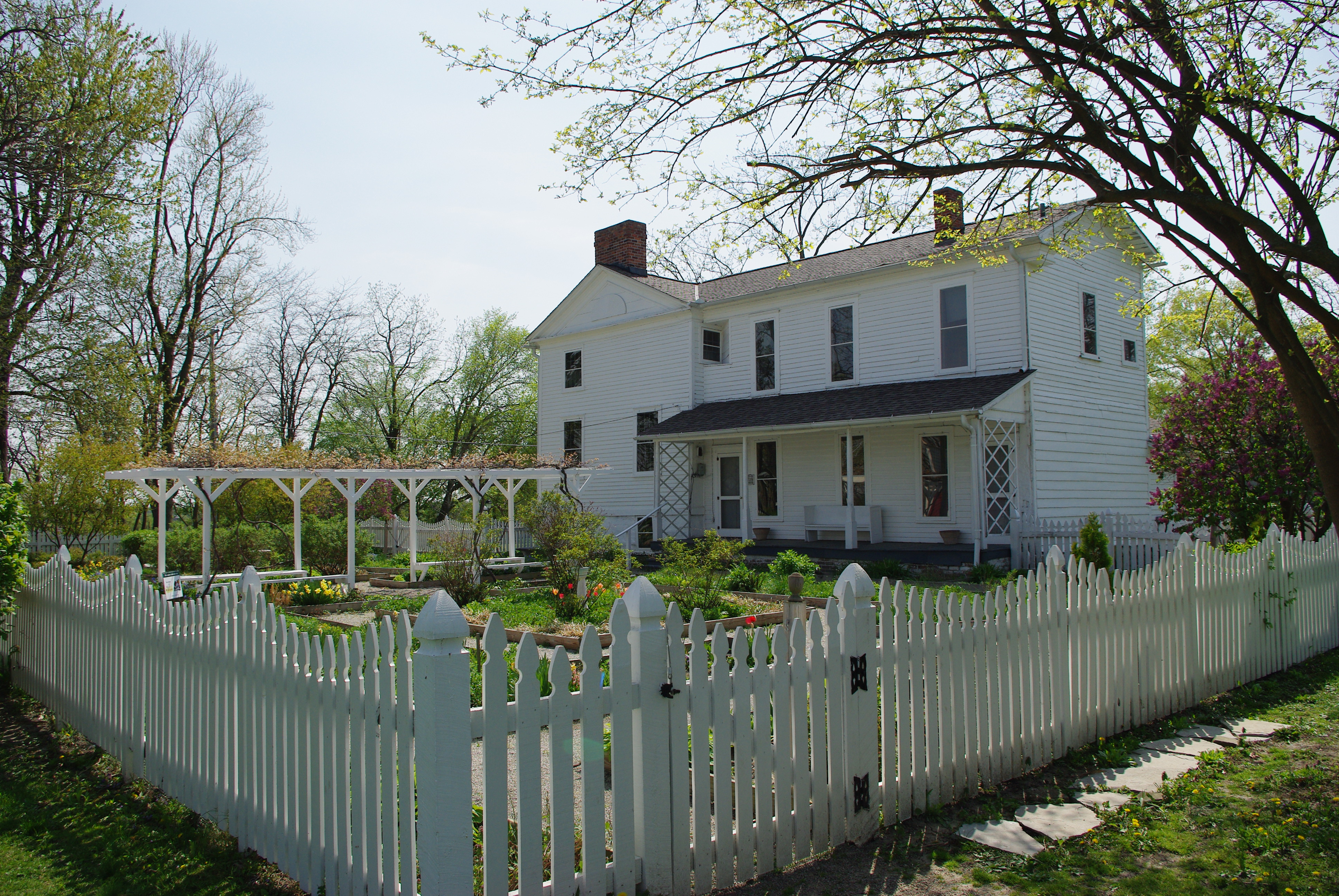
Looking across the garden at the Hull–Wolcott House

- The Wolcott House, c. 1835*
- The Log House, c. 1850
- The Gilbert-Flanigan House, c. 1841
- The Box Schoolhouse, c. 1850
- The Clover Leaf Depot, c. 1888
- The Monclova Country Church, c. 1901

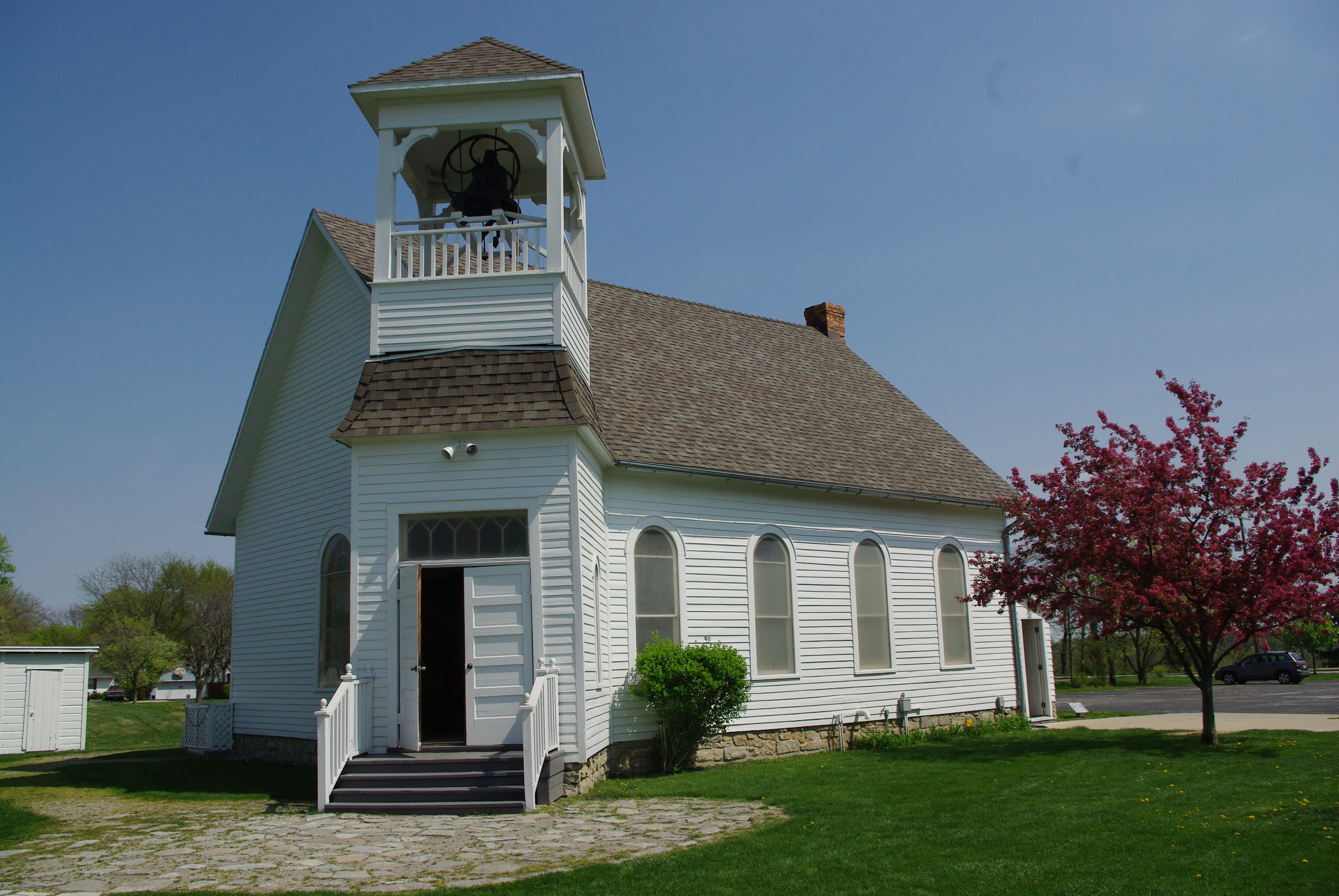
The Monclova Country Church
