= Murphysboro station =

- Mobile and Ohio Railroad Depot
- U.S. National Register of Historic Places
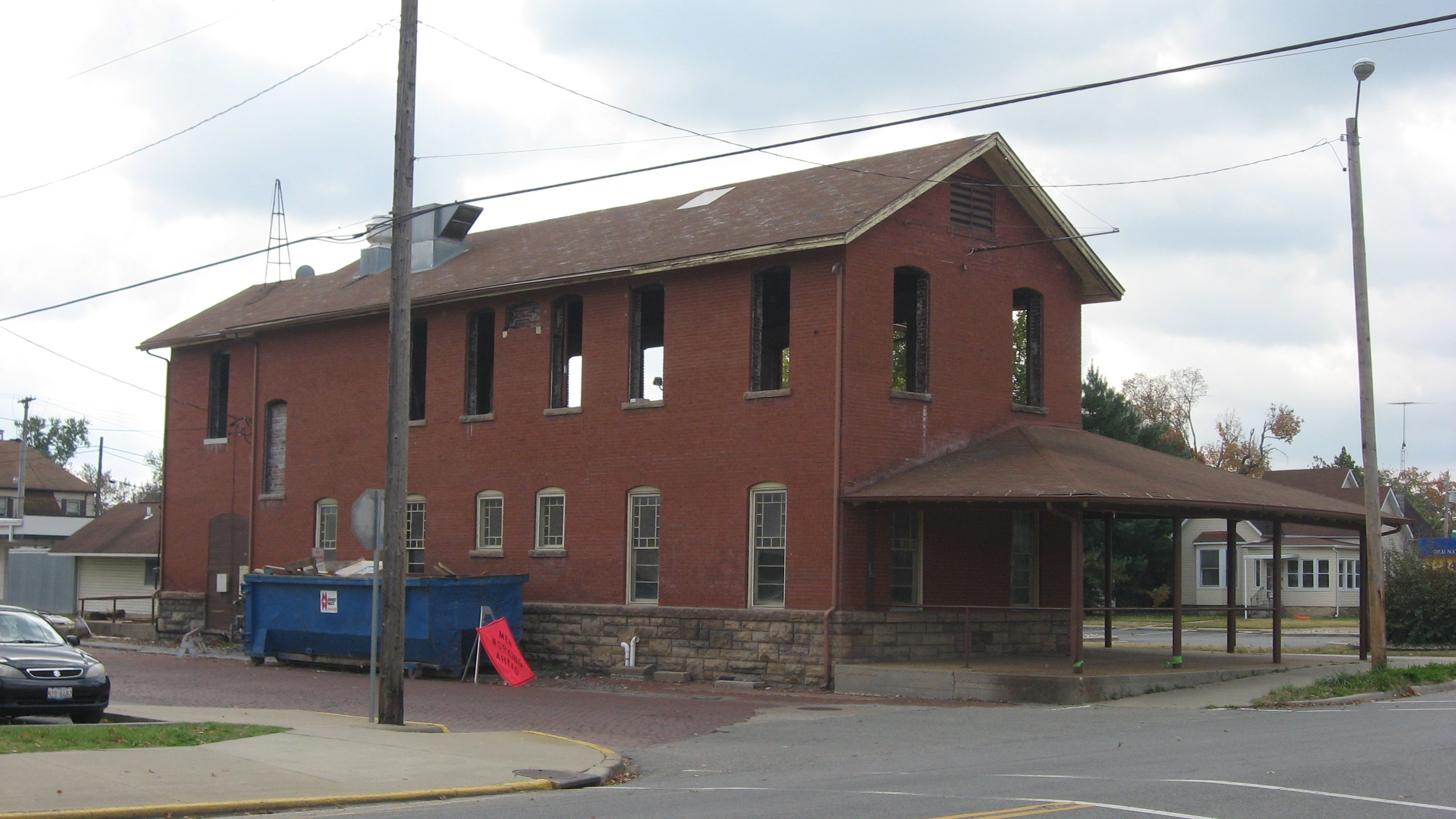

- Location within Illinois Location within the United States
- Location: 1701 Walnut St., Murphysboro, Illinois
- Coordinates: 37°45′51″N 89°20′31″W
- Area: 0.2 acres (0.081 ha)
- Built: 1888
- Architect: Frew, Philip N.
- NRHP reference No.: 84000317
- Added to NRHP: November 13, 1984

The Mobile and Ohio Railroad Depot is the former Mobile and Ohio Railroad station serving Murphysboro, Illinois. Built in 1888, the station was the largest on the Mobile and Ohio line between St. Louis, Missouri and Cairo, Illinois. The station was probably designed by Philip N. Frew, a railroad employee who designed several other prominent buildings in Murphysboro. The railroad provided a benefit to Murphysboro's economy in several ways. The city's business and entertainment district developed around the station, which brought passengers and workers to the city. The railroad also exported the produce and fruit grown by Murphysboro's agriculture industry. In addition, the repair shops adjacent to the station employed over 500 workers. The Tri-State Tornado destroyed the shops and roundhouse at Murphysboro, but the depot survived the storm.

The depot closed in 1977, by which time the railway had become part of the Illinois Central system. It was added to the National Register of Historic Places in 1984.

Preceding station	Gulf, Mobile and Ohio Railroad	Following station
Etherton toward Mobile	Main Line	Oraville toward St. Louis
