= William H. Hull House =

Historic house in Illinois, United States

- U.S. National Register of Historic Places
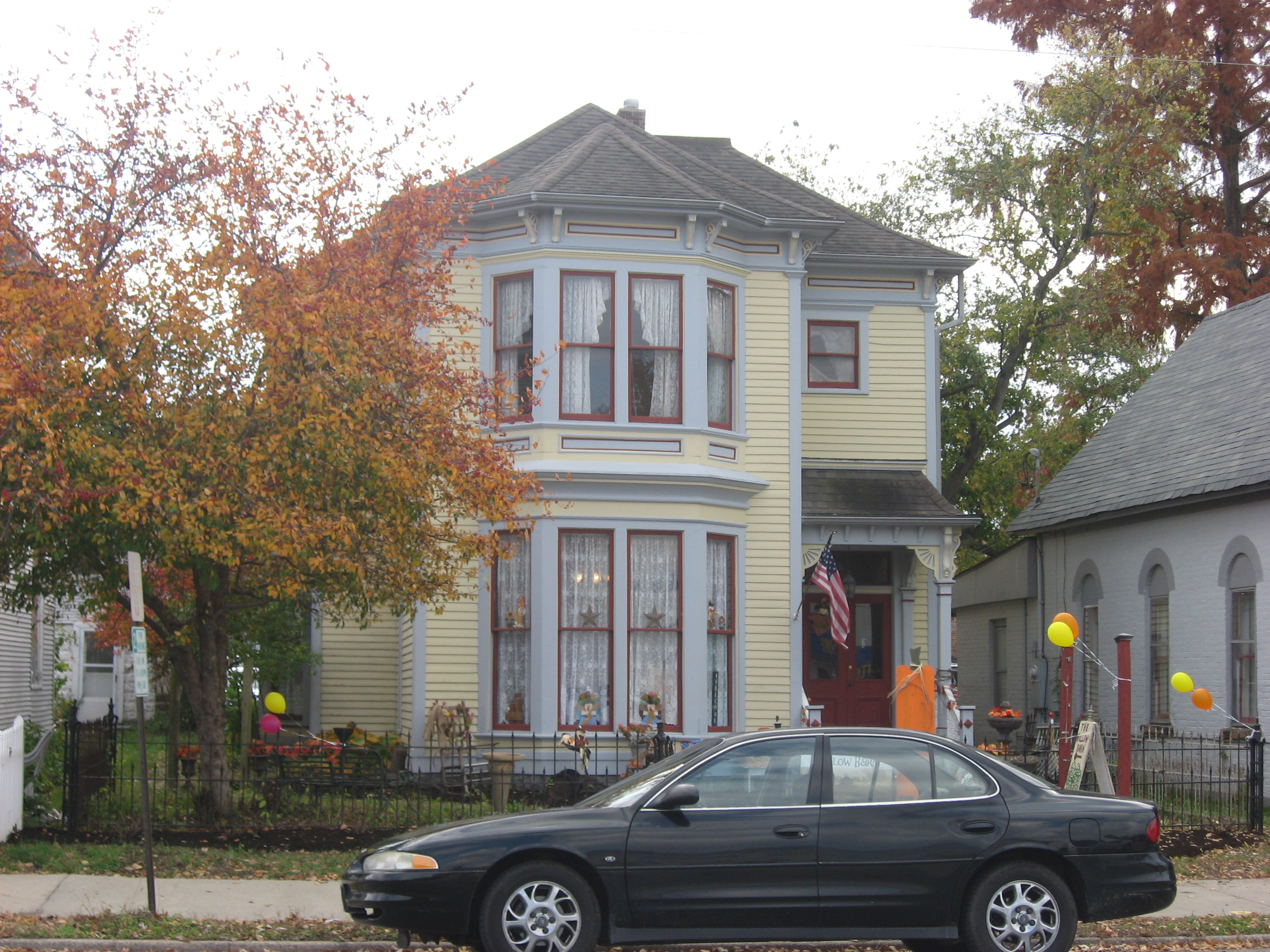

- Location within Illinois Location within the United States
- Location: 1517 Walnut St., Murphysboro, Illinois
- Coordinates: 37°45′51″N 89°20′25″W
- Area: less than one acre
- Built: 1887
- Architectural style: Italianate
- NRHP reference No.: 05001602
- Added to NRHP: February 1, 2006

The William H. Hull House is a historic house located at 1517 Walnut St. in Murphysboro, Illinois. The house was built in 1887 for William H. Hull, a significant local businessman and politician. The house is designed in an asymmetrical Italianate pattern. The front facade of the house features a three-sided projecting bay topped by a half-hipped roof. The main entrance is located to the side of the bay in a porch supported by chamfered columns with decorative brackets. The cornice of the house features a patterned molding divided by ornamental brackets. The house's roof has a cross-hipped design with flared eaves.

The house was added to the National Register of Historic Places on February 1, 2006.
