= Jackson County Courthouse (Illinois) =

Local government building in the United States

- U.S. National Register of Historic Places
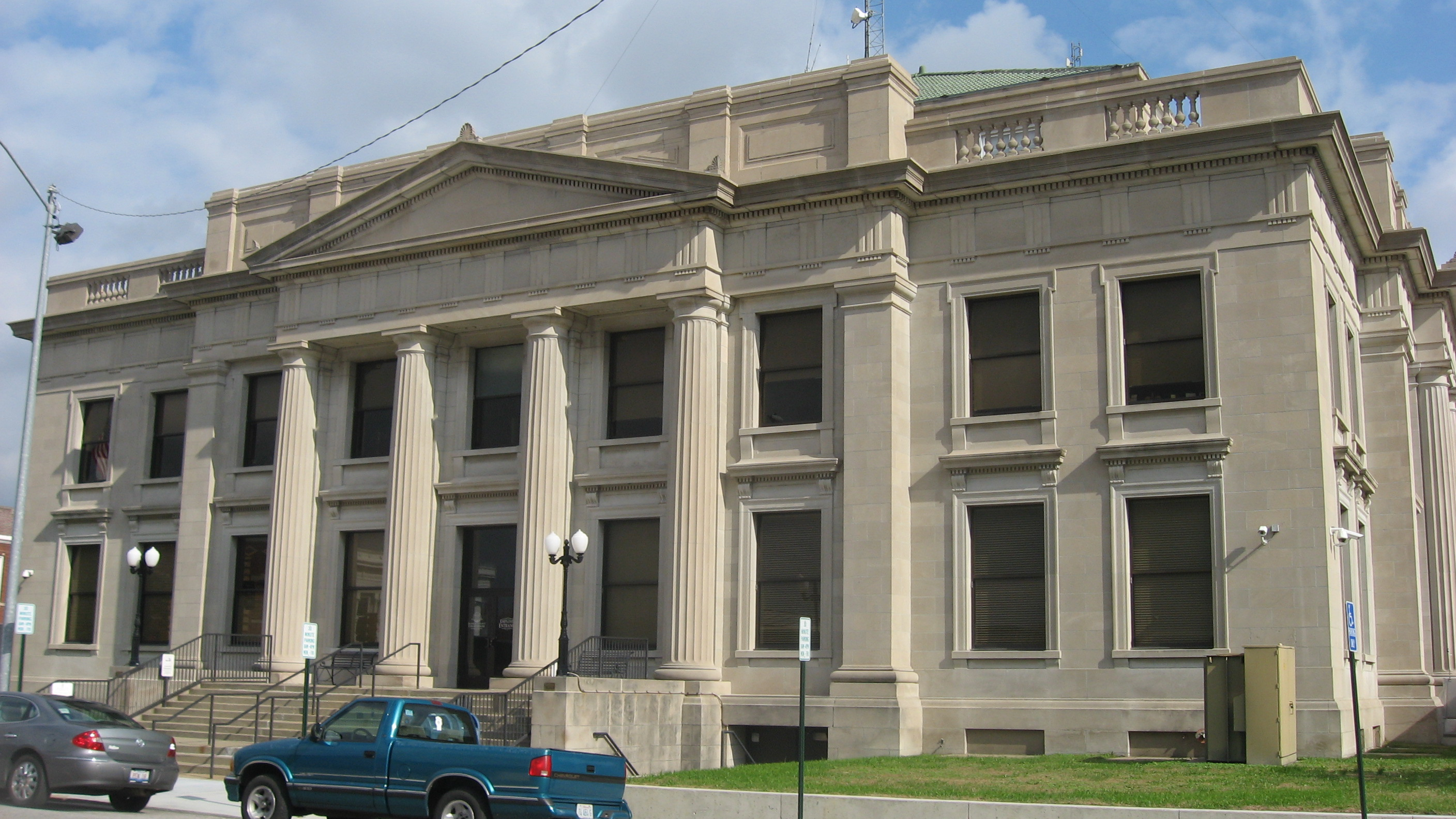

- Location within Illinois Location within the United States
- Interactive map showing the location of Jackson County Courthouse
- Location: 1001 Walnut St. Murphysboro, Illinois
- Coordinates: 37°45′51″N 89°20′06″W
- Built: 1927
- Architect: Nelson Strong Spencer
- Architectural style: Classical Revival, Beaux-Arts
- NRHP reference No.: 15000931
- Added to NRHP: December 29, 2015

The Jackson County Courthouse, located at 1001 Walnut St. in Murphysboro, is the county courthouse serving Jackson County, Illinois. Built in 1927, the courthouse was the fourth built by the county and the third in Murphysboro. Architect Nelson Strong Spencer designed the courthouse in a mix of the Classical Revival and Beaux-Arts styles. The front entrance features a pediment and entablature supported by four columns, all designed according to the Doric order. A parapet and a terrace with balustrades along the sides, both among the building's prominent Beaux-Arts elements, line the roof. In addition to its government functions, the courthouse has hosted large community events and serves as the focal point of downtown Murphysboro.

The courthouse was added to the National Register of Historic Places on December 29, 2015.
