= West Walnut Street Historic District =

Historic district in Illinois, United States

- U.S. National Register of Historic Places
- U.S. Historic district
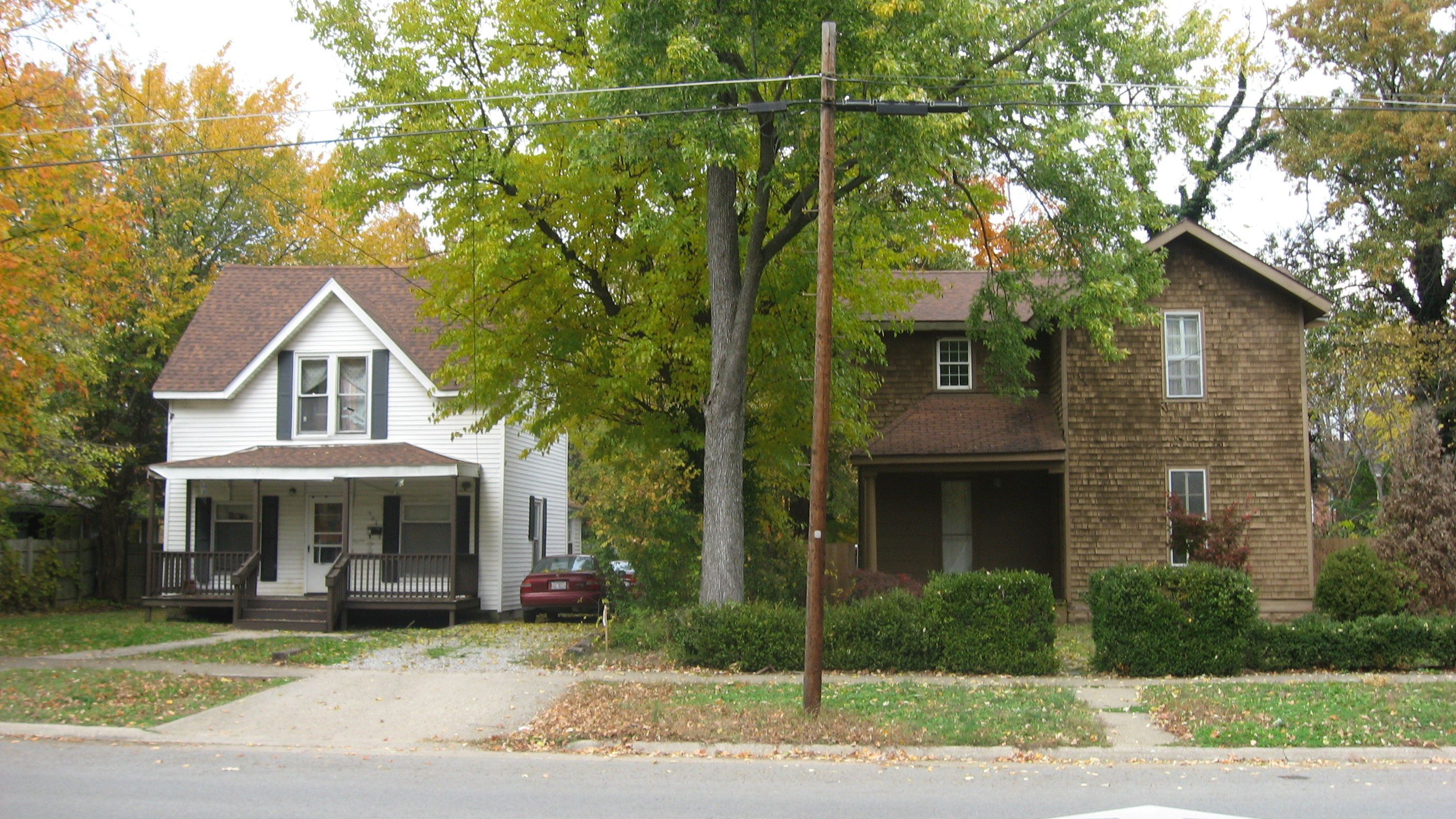
- The northern side of the 500 block of West Walnut

- Location within Illinois Location within the United States
- Location: Roughly bounded by W. Elm, S. Poplar, W. Main, and S. Forest Sts., Carbondale, Illinois
- Coordinates: 37°43′32″N 89°13′28″W
- Area: 18 acres (7.3 ha)
- Architectural style: Colonial Revival, Italianate, Queen Anne
- NRHP reference No.: 75000664
- Added to NRHP: May 2, 1975

The West Walnut Street Historic District is a residential historic district centered on part of West Walnut Street in Carbondale, Illinois. The district includes 54 houses; 48 of these are considered contributing buildings due to being built prior to 1929. During this time period, the Walnut Street area was regarded as the most desirable part of Carbondale. Several popular architectural styles of the period are represented in the district, including Italianate, Queen Anne, and Colonial Revival. The oldest home in the district, which was built in 1859, is a plain frame building. The 1868–69 Italianate house at 505 West Walnut was the home of Robert Allyn, the first president of Southern Illinois University; Allyn, who bought the house in 1879, added the house's mansard roof, the only one in Carbondale.

The district was added to the National Register of Historic Places on May 2, 1975.
