= Murphysboro, Illinois =

- City
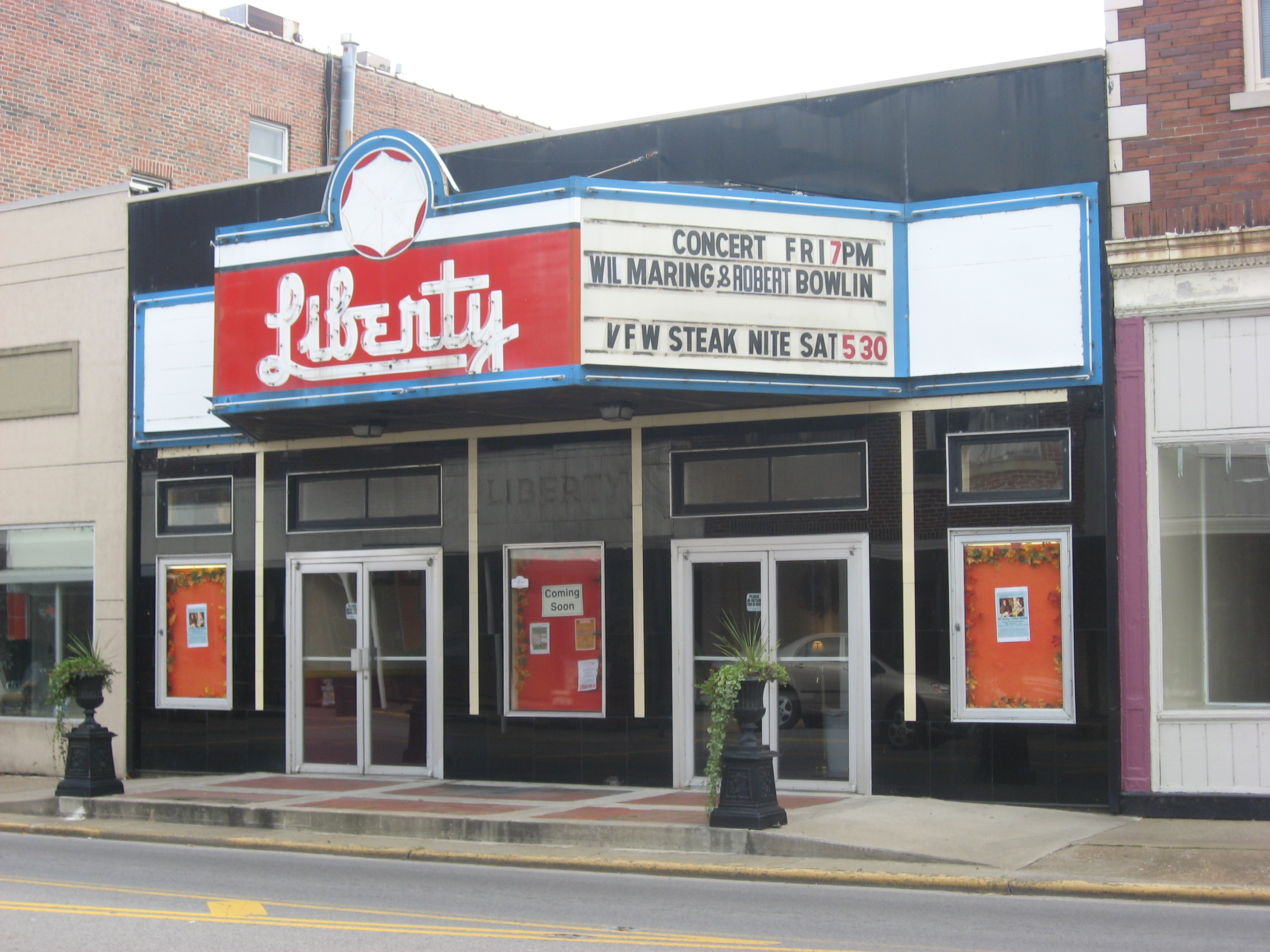
- Liberty Theater, 2013

- Flag Seal
- Motto: "Ripe with possibilities"
- Interactive map of Murphysboro, Illinois
- Location within Illinois Location within the United States
- Coordinates: 37°45′30″N 89°20′22″W
- Country: United States
- State: Illinois
- County: Jackson
- Townships: Murphysboro, Somerset
- Founded: 1843

Area
  - Total: 5.33 sq mi (13.81 km^{2})
  - Land: 5.25 sq mi (13.59 km^{2})
  - Water: 0.085 sq mi (0.22 km^{2})
- Elevation: 410 ft (120 m)

Population (2020)
  - Total: 7,093
  - Density: 1,351.6/sq mi (521.86/km^{2})
- Time zone: UTC-6 (CST)
  - Summer (DST): UTC-5 (CDT)
- ZIP code: 62966
- Area code: 618
- FIPS code: 17-51453
- GNIS feature ID: 2395141
- Website: murphysboro.com

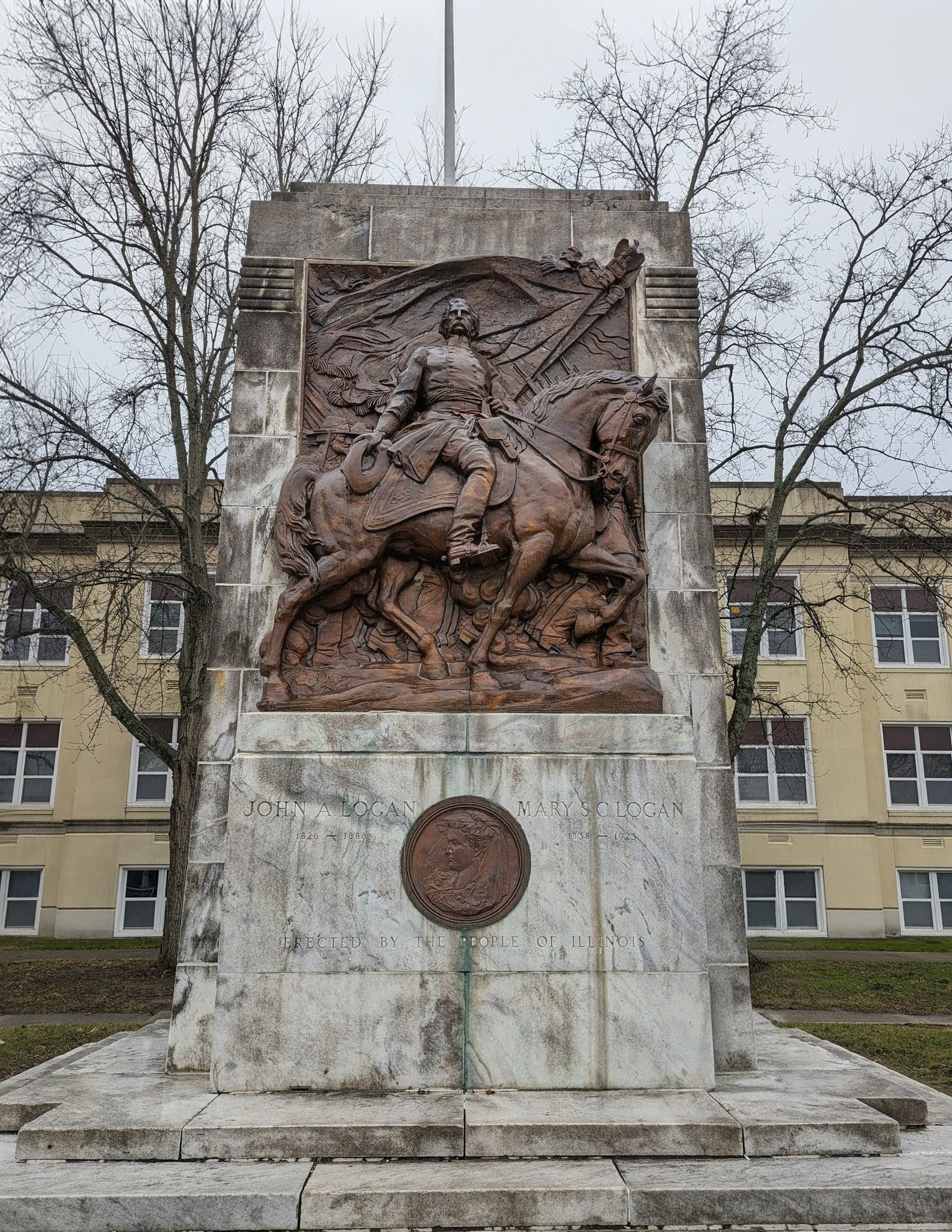
Gen. John A Logan Statue at the Murphysboro Middle School

Murphysboro is a city in and the county seat of Jackson County, Illinois, United States. The population was 7,093 at the 2020 census. The city is part of the Metro Lakeland area.

== History ==
Established in September 1843, Murphysboro is the second county seat of Jackson County. The town's creation is tied to the disastrous fire which destroyed the courthouse in the first county seat, Brownsville. The fire proved to be the catalyst to move the county seat to a more central location. The name was decided for the new town when William C. Murphy's name was drawn from a hat containing the names of the three commissioners who chose the new location, a 20-acre (81,000 m^{2}) tract of land donated by Dr. John Logan and Elizabeth Logan.

The son of the site's donors, Major General John A. Logan, later became a volunteer general in the Civil War. General Logan is also remembered for a distinguished political career, serving as Illinois' US senator from 1871 to 1877 and 1880–1886, as well as for running for vice president in 1884. At the time of his death he was considered a presidential hopeful. Logan's greatest legacy, however, is his creation of Memorial Day as a national holiday.

The economy of Murphysboro was based on coal for many of its growing years. It was also important in industry and transportation.

On March 18, 1925, at around 2:30 pm, 234 people were killed when the Tri-State tornado hit Murphysboro. This number exceeds the death toll of any single community in a tornado event in U.S. history. Murphysboro was essentially destroyed. Another F4 affected the area on December 18, 1957, causing intense damage to the southeast portion of the town.

The city was heavily affected by the May 2009 Southern Midwest derecho, which destroyed houses, brought down power lines, and left the town without electricity for a week. One man was killed by a falling tree limb.

In 2017, the total solar eclipse of August 21, 2017 had its point of longest duration (2 minutes, 41.7 seconds) near Murphysboro, at a point about 8 kilometers to the southeast (89.4030 degrees west longitude, 37.69335 degrees north latitude) in Giant City State Park.

=== Revitalization efforts ===
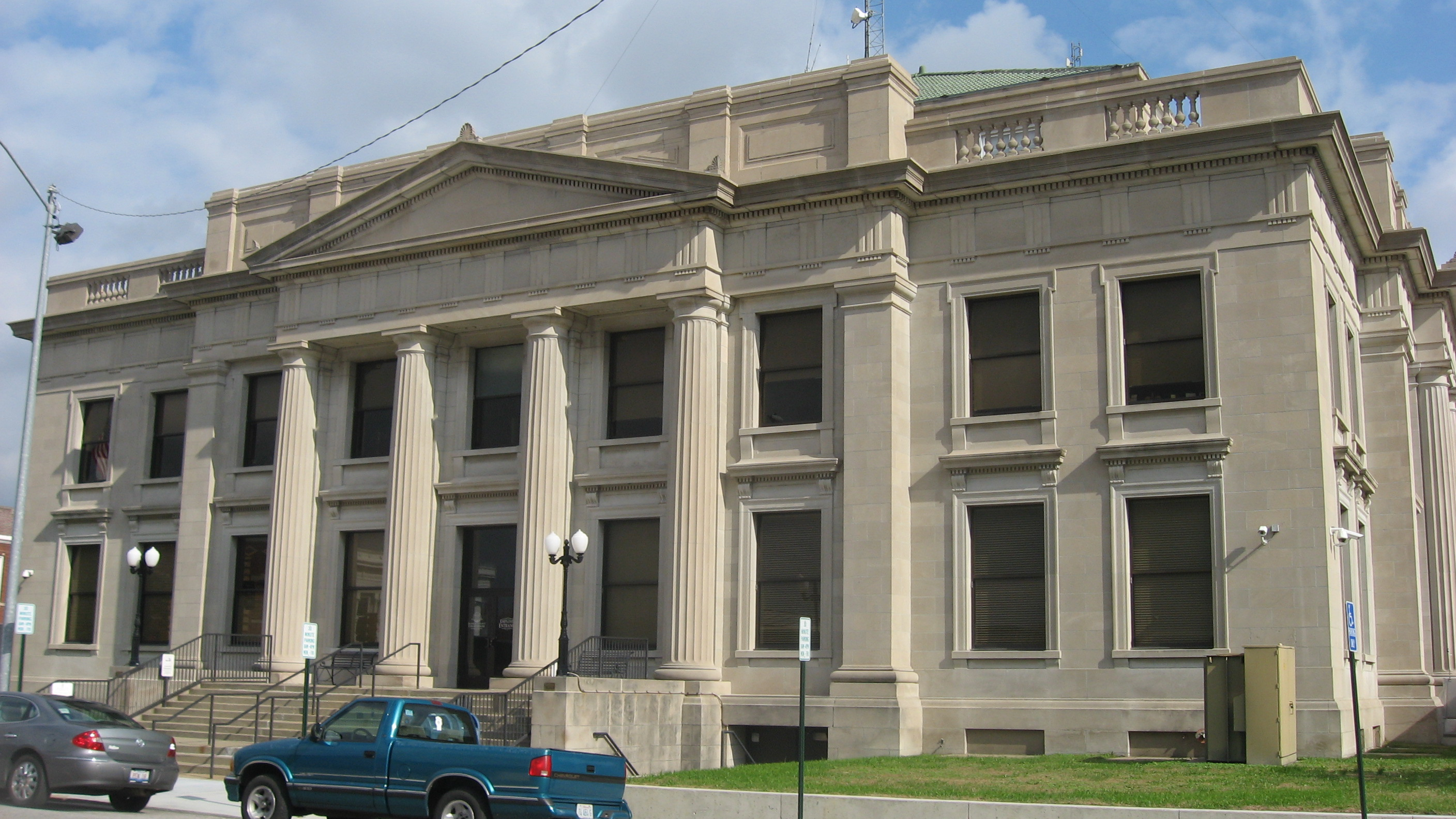
Jackson County Courthouse, November 2013

In recent years, business and tourism organizations have been at the front of renewing interest in the town as a center of historical and cultural tourism.

Murphysboro's General John A. Logan Museum, the Murphysboro Tourism Bureau, the Chamber of Commerce, and Friends of Murphysboro have been working together to restore interest in the maintenance of architectural treasures such as the band shell in Riverside Park, an example of the type of large-scale project of the Works Progress Administration; the Robert W. Hamilton House, a nearly intact example of 19th-century Carpenter Gothic architecture; and the Liberty Theater, once a $1-movie house now converted into a center for regional film festivals, nostalgia nights, and concerts.

The Logan Museum Neighborhood has been the site of a project designed to convert some of the neighborhood's homes into exhibit and gallery spaces. The neighborhood currently consists of the Shayley House, the Hughes House, the Horsfield Printshop, and the Bular House. The Bular House contains the museum's main offices and exhibit spaces. The Shayley House is the headquarters of the Murphysboro Tourism Commission and host to an exhibit detailing the town's history. The Hughes House is dedicated gallery space available to local artists. The Horsfield Printshop is the only building of the four not open to the general public. It houses a seamstress shop that produces replica clothing for local schools and the General John A. Logan Museum.

== Geography ==
According to the 2021 census gazetteer files, Murphysboro has a total area of 5.33 square miles (13.80 km^{2}), of which 5.25 square miles (13.60 km^{2}) (or 98.41%) is land and 0.09 square miles (0.23 km^{2}) (or 1.59%) is water. The city is located 5 miles (8.0 km) southeast of Kinkaid Lake. Although Murphysboro is only 10 miles east of the Mississippi River, the nearest access point to the river is in Grand Tower, a roughly 30 minute drive southwest.

As part of the humid subtropical climate (Köppen climate classification Cfa), a small number of cold hardy palm trees are able to grow in Murphysboro which can live year-round, and may be found sparingly around the municipality.

== Demographics ==
Historical population
Census	Pop.	Note	%±
1880	2,196		—
1890	3,880		76.7%
1900	6,463		66.6%
1910	7,485		15.8%
1920	10,703		43.0%
1930	8,182		−23.6%
1940	8,976		9.7%
1950	9,241		3.0%
1960	8,673		−6.1%
1970	10,013		15.5%
1980	9,866		−1.5%
1990	9,176		−7.0%
2000	8,840		−3.7%
2010	7,978		−9.8%
2020	7,093		−11.1%
U.S. Decennial Census

=== 2020 census ===
As of the 2020 census, Murphysboro had a population of 7,093. The population density was 1,330.02 inhabitants per square mile (513.52/km^{2}). The average housing unit density was 701.86 per square mile (270.99/km^{2}).

The median age was 38.3 years. 23.7% of residents were under the age of 18 and 18.8% of residents were 65 years of age or older. For every 100 females there were 97.6 males, and for every 100 females age 18 and over there were 94.2 males age 18 and over.

95.6% of residents lived in urban areas, while 4.4% lived in rural areas.

There were 3,110 households in Murphysboro, of which 26.9% had children under the age of 18 living in them. Of all households, 31.1% were married-couple households, 23.3% were households with a male householder and no spouse or partner present, and 38.6% were households with a female householder and no spouse or partner present. There were 1,918 families residing in the city. About 40.0% of all households were made up of individuals and 17.0% had someone living alone who was 65 years of age or older.

There were 3,743 housing units, of which 16.9% were vacant. The homeowner vacancy rate was 6.9% and the rental vacancy rate was 14.2%.

Racial composition as of the 2020 census
Race	Number	Percent
White	5,132	72.4%
Black or African American	1,200	16.9%
American Indian and Alaska Native	9	0.1%
Asian	38	0.5%
Native Hawaiian and Other Pacific Islander	4	0.1%
Some other race	226	3.2%
Two or more races	484	6.8%
Hispanic or Latino (of any race)	345	4.9%

=== Income and poverty ===
The median income for a household in the city was $37,929, and the median income for a family was $42,461. Males had a median income of $26,934 versus $26,110 for females. The per capita income for the city was $22,664. About 17.8% of families and 18.9% of the population were below the poverty line, including 33.1% of those under age 18 and 10.0% of those age 65 or over.

== Education ==
It is in the Murphysboro Community Unit School District 186.

== Festivals ==
Murphysboro is home of the Apple Festival, always the second weekend after Labor Day. The city hosts the Big Muddy Brewfest every October. It draws 100+ breweries and 2000+ visitors each fall.

The Oak Street Art Fair is held in the Logan historic arts neighborhood of Murphysboro each April. The Big Muddy Monster festival occurs in June with attractions around the city. The festival first started in June 2023.

== Transportation ==
JAX Mass Transit provides deviated fixed-route bus service between Murphysboro and Carbondale.

== Notable people ==
- Mike Bost (born 1960), U.S. representative for Illinois
- R. G. Crisenberry (1882–1965), Illinois state legislator, educator, and businessman
- Gary M. Geiger (1937–1996), major league baseball player
- Theo Germaine (born 1992), actor; childhood resident of Murphysboro
- Joseph B. Gill (1862–1942), lieutenant governor of Illinois, 1893–1897
- Rudolph Zerses Gill (1866–1951), architect of public and municipal buildings
- Otis F. Glenn (1879–1959), attorney and politician
- Jeff Keener (born 1959), major league baseball player
- John A. Logan (1826–1886), politician and soldier
- Robert H. Mohlenbrock (1931-2024) botanist and co-founder of Illinois Native Plant Society
- Laurence Millard Nolan, a.k.a. Big Twist (1937–1990), Noted Blues singer
- Don Ohl (1936-2024), professional basketball player
- Gilbert H. Poor (1866- ?), newspaper publisher and politician
- L. Bruce Richmond, politician and businessman
- Flynn Robinson (1941–2013), NBA basketball player with several teams
- Cyrus Thomas (1825–1910), attorney, entomologist and professor of natural history
- Willard W. Waller (1899–1945), sociologist
