= Shawnee Mass Transit District =

Provider of mass transportation in Southern Illinois

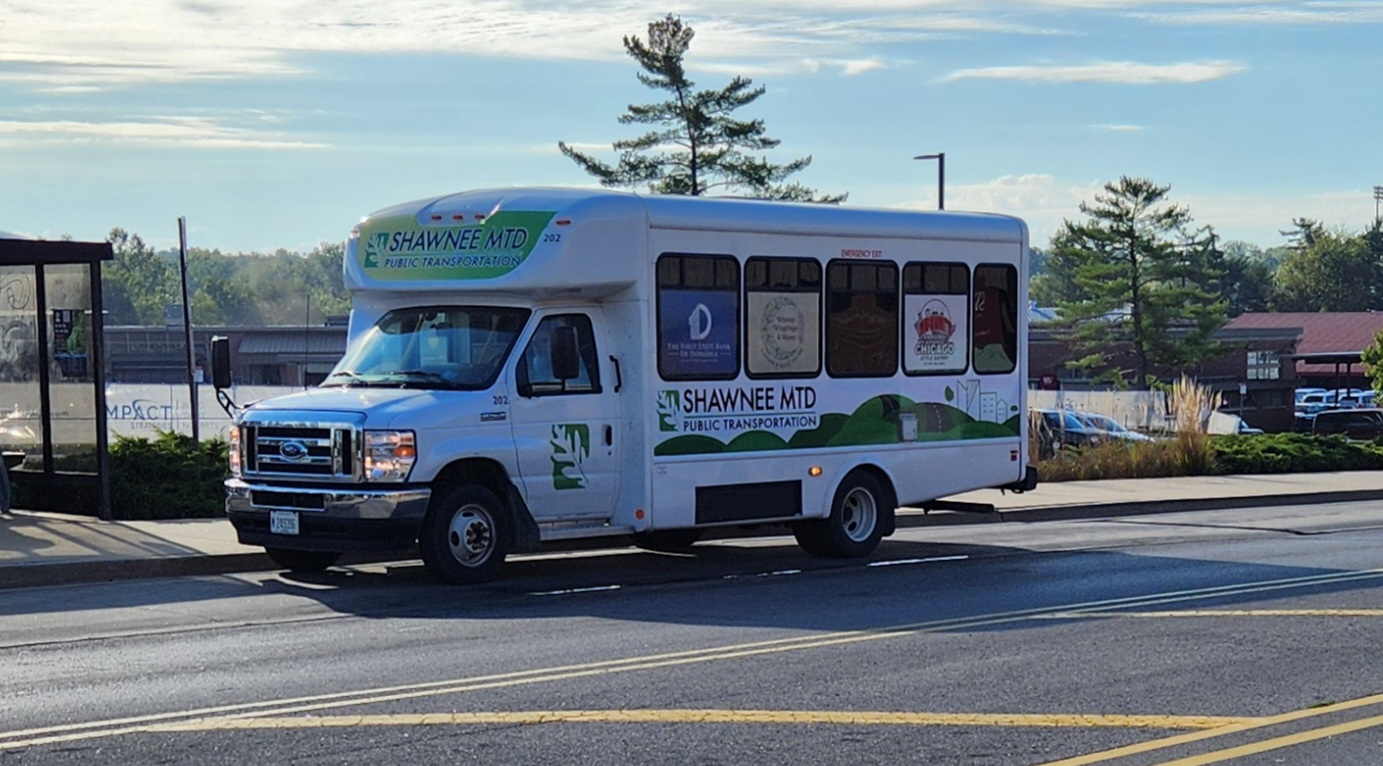
- A Shawnee MTD bus in October 2025
- Formerly: Southern Most Area Rural Transit (2003-2013)
- Founded: January 30, 2001
- Commenced operation: 2003
- Headquarters: 100 Smart Drive, Vienna, IL 62995
- Locale: Anna, Cairo, and Metropolis, Illinois
- Service area: Southwest Illinois; Alexander, Johnson, Massac, Pulaski, Union Counties
- Service type: Bus service, paratransit
- Routes: 5
- Fleet: 78 vehicles
- Annual ridership: 113,788 (2023)
- Website: Shawnee MTD

Shawnee Mass Transit District (often shortened to Shawnee MTD) is a provider of mass transportation in Southern Illinois, primarily serving Anna, Cario, and Metropolis. Fixed-route and inter-city transit services are provided in these communities, while additional demand-response service is available through their 5 county service area which include Alexander County, Johnson County, Massac County, Pulaski County, and Union County. As of 2023, the system provided 113,788 rides with around 33,029 revenue hours and a fleet of 78 vehicles.

== History ==
Shawnee MTD was originally created on January 30, 2001 after a five-county resolution passed which saw the creation of a new public transportation service for Alexander, Johnson, Massac, Pulaski, and Union Counties. The agency officially began operation in 2003 under the name Southern Most Area Rural Transit (SMART) with depots in Anna and Metropolis as well as administrative offices being housed at the Ullin Fire Department. The agency would eventually move their offices to Shawnee Community College as well as their Karnak maintenance facility and operate there from 2005 to 2009. Eventually, they moved all their administrative to Vienna in 2009. in 2013, the agency would drop the Southern Most Area Rural Transit name and rebrand to Shawnee Mass Transit District. In 2014, Shawnee MTD began construction on new administrative offices that would be completed by July 2015. In March of 2020, ground was broken for two new depots in Metropolis (completed in April of 2021) and Mounds (completed in June 2021). In 2022, Shawnee MTD would break ground for a new depot in Anna (completed in January 2024) and demolish the Karnak depot for replacement(completed in February 2024).

== Service ==
Shawnee MTD offers five different service routes. These include three fixed routes. These include the Anna-Jonesboro Fixed Route, the Metropolis Fixed Route, and the Mounds-Cairo-Mound City(Tri-Town Service) Fixed Route. Shawnee MTD also provides two inter-city routes from Cairo that will either take riders to Cape Girardeau or Carbondale. Local and inter-city request services operate throughout the five-county region. Regular fares for fixed-route services start at $1.00.

=== Fixed-Routes ===
Route	Termini			Availability	Source
Route	Start		End	Availability	Source
Anna-Jonesboro Fixed Route	from Kroger in Anna	↔	to Walmart in Anna	Monday-Friday (7:00AM-2:00PM)	
Metropolis Fixed Route	from Dollar General (10th Street)	↔	to Metropolis Drugs	Monday-Friday (7:00AM-2:00PM)	
Tri-Town Service	from Mounds	↔	to Mound City	Monday-Friday (8:00AM-4:00PM)	

=== Inter-city Routes ===
Route	Termini			Course	Availability	Source
Route	Start		End	Course	Availability	Source
Cairo to Cape	from Cairo	↔	to Cape Girardeau	Cairo; Mound City; Mounds; Tamms; Olive Branch; Cape Girardeau	Monday-Friday (7:00AM-4:00PM)	
Cairo to Carbondale	from Cairo	↔	to Carbondale	Cairo; Mound City; Mounds; Ullin; Anna; Carbondale	Monday-Friday (7:00AM-4:00PM)	

== Fixed Route Ridership ==
The ridership statistics shown here are of the deviated fixed route services operated by Shawnee MTD from 2014 to 2023.

== See also ==
- List of bus transit systems in the United States
- JAX Mass Transit
- Rides Mass Transit District
