= Regina Polk =

American labor leader (1950–1983)

Regina V. Polk
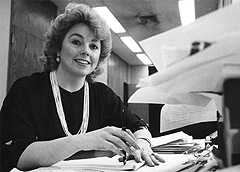
- Born: February 14, 1950
- Died: October 11, 1983 (aged 33)
- Education: Mills College, University of Chicago
- Known for: Labor and women's rights activism

Regina Victoria Polk (February 14, 1950 – October 11, 1983) (Note: The date of her death was incorrectly stated as October 12, 1983 by Hesser and Breving. The actual date was October 11, 1983. See Air Illinois commuter flight) was an American labor leader and an activist for women workers in Chicago during the 1970s and 1980s. She was first an organizer and then a business agent for Local 743, the largest local in the International Brotherhood of Teamsters at that time. Throughout her career, she campaigned to organize and then represent clerical workers in predominantly female workplaces.

== Early life and education ==
Regina Victoria Polk (Gina) was born February 14, 1950, in Casa Grande, Arizona. She was brought up by her father, Henry, a poor farmer, and her mother, Helen. Regina lived in Arizona until 1966 when the family moved to Paradise, California. She graduated from Paradise High School in 1968. Gina went on to attended Mills College, at that time, an all-women's college, where many of her classmates were wealthy young women. Polk was active politically in the civil rights and anti-war movements of the late 1960's. She graduated in 1972 with a degree in Sociology. After working for a year in California, she moved to Chicago, Illinois to attend graduate school in Industrial Relations at the University of Chicago. There, she met her future husband, Thomas Heagy, a fellow graduate student.

== Career ==
In 1974, at the age of 25, Polk began to work part-time as a hostess at the Red Star Inn.Appalled at the workplace conditions and the way employees were mistreated, she approached Local 734 of the Teamsters to ask them for help. She began a unionization campaign at the restaurant and was promptly fired. With the union's assistance, Polk successfully secured an unfair labor practice from the restaurant, but rather than returning to work, she joined the Teamsters as an organizer. She focused on white-collar workers and, in the succeeding years, led the organization of the clerical workers at Blue Cross/Blue Shield of Illinois, the University of Chicago, and Governors State University. Polk then became the business agent for the employees at the two universities. During her time at the Teamsters, she actively promoted the role of women, focusing on organizing companies whose employees were predominately women, and also the promotion of women within union ranks.

== Death and legacy ==
In 1982, when Aldens, a major catalog company, closed their doors, over two thousand union members of Local 743 lost their jobs. Polk was put in charge of developing programs that would help them be retrained and re-enter the workforce. On October 11, 1983, she died in the crash of an Air Illinois commuter flight, on her way to a meeting on job programs for former Alden's employees. At the time of her death, she was one of the highest-ranking officials of the Teamsters Union.

After her death, her friends and colleagues established the Regina V. Polk Scholarship Fund for Labor Leadership in her honor, which currently supports the Regina V Polk Labor Leadership Conference presented by the University of Illinois Urbana-Champaign and programs for educating high school students about labor relations and labor history DePaul University in Chicago.

== Personal life ==
Polk was married to Thomas C Heagy.

== Bibliography ==
- Breving, Bob (2007), "Regina Polk Champions of Workers' Rights", Changing Society: The Lives of Worker Heroes Who Made a Difference, Chicago: Charles H. Keer Publishing Company, pp. 63–77.
- Hesser, Terry (2008), I am a Teamster, Chicago: Lake Claremont Press.
- Lee, Chart (October 29, 1979). "Clerical Union OKs Contract by 10-1 Margin". The University of Chicago Maroon. Chicago, Illinois. p. 1.
- Preston, Caroline (March 8, 2018), "Teaching Class Solidarity", The Nation.
- Strong, James (December 14, 1976). "Teamsters win at Blue Cross". Chicago Tribune. Chicago, Illinois. p. 45.
- Twarog, Emily E. LB. (2016), "The Polk School: Intersections of Women's Leadership Education and the Public Sphere", in Deslippe, Dennis; Fure-Slocum, Eric; Mckerley, John W. (eds.), Civic Labors: Scholar Activism and Working-Class Studies, Urbana: University of Illinois Press, OCLC 946905564.
- Twarog, Emily E. LB. "The Polk School - Women's Leadership Development and Labor Extension". LABORonline. The Labor and Working Class History Association.
- Warren, James (July 24, 1983). "Jobless battle bureaucratic blizzard". Chicago Sun-Times. Chicago, Illinois. p. 6.
- Warren, James (January 28, 1985). "Teamsters Local helps idled Aldens workers". Chicago Tribune. Chicago, Illinois. p. 1, Section 2.
- Warren, James; Gratteau, Hanke (October 31, 1983). "Promising Union Career Ended in Fatal Crash". Chicago Sun-Times. Chicago, Illinois. p. 21.
- Worthen, Helena (2019), "Regina V. Polk Women's Labor Leadership Conference: Whole Body, Whole-life Struggle", in Hanson, Cindy; Paavo, Adriane; Sisters in Labour Education (eds.), Cracking Labour's Glass Ceiling: Transforming Lives through Women's Union Education, Black Point, NS, Canada: Fernwood Publishing.
