= Saluki Express =

Provider of mass transportation in Carbondale, Illinois

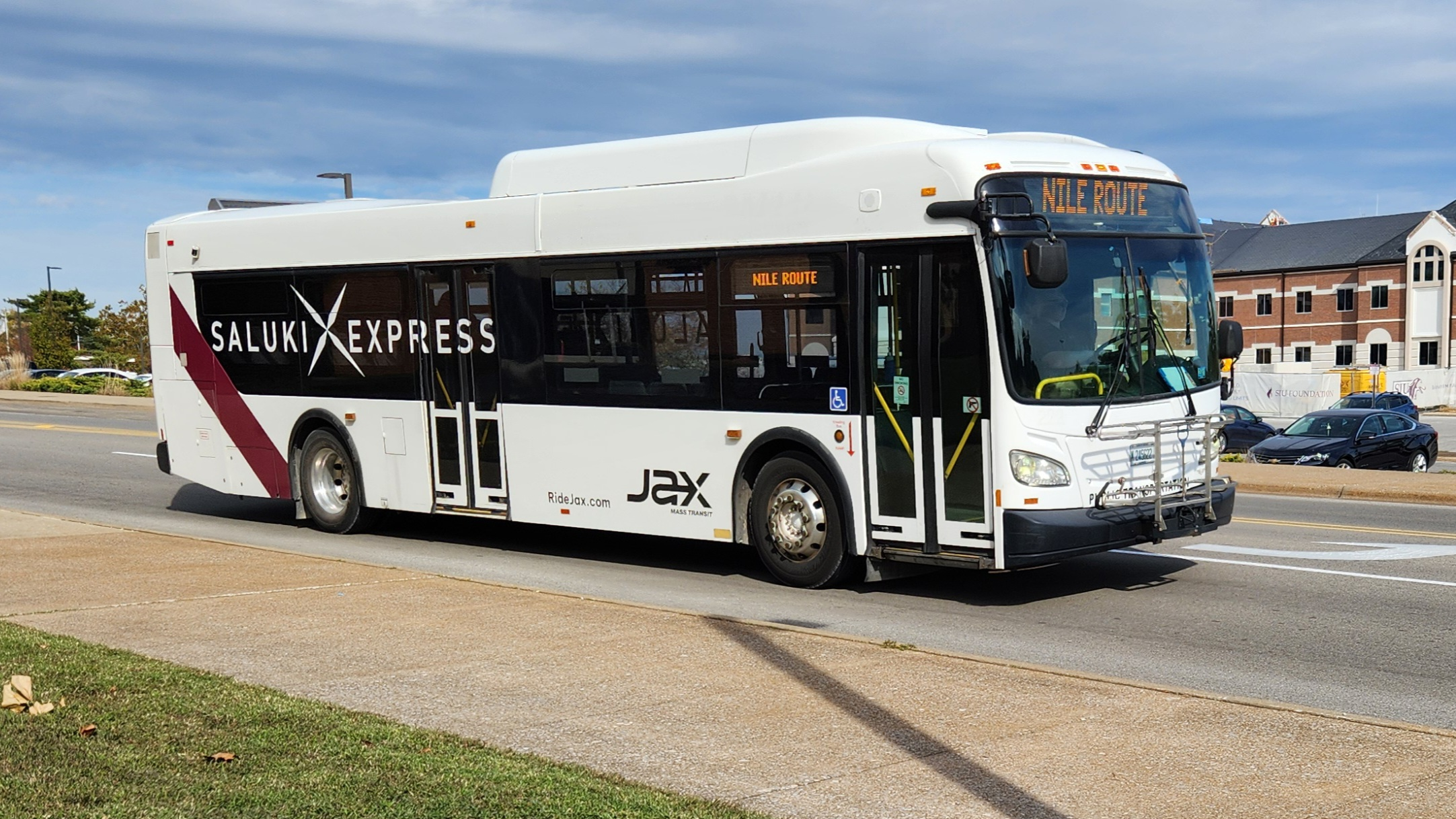
- A Saluki Express bus seen on the campus of SIU
- Founded: August 1995
- Headquarters: Southern Illinois University Carbondale
- Locale: Carbondale, Illinois and SIU
- Service area: Carbondale
- Service type: Bus service, paratransit
- Routes: 4
- Annual ridership: estimated around 100,000 (2024)
- Operator: JAX Mass Transit (2024-present); Rides Mass Transit District (2019-2024); Beck Bus Transportation (1995-2019)
- Website: Saluki Express

Saluki Express is a provider of mass transportation in Carbondale, Illinois. It was created as a way to provide transportation services to the students and staff of Southern Illinois University Carbondale at no cost. Fixed-route transit services are provided to the university and residents of Carbondale. The transportation itself is provided via contraction to local transit providers with JAX Mass Transit serving as the latest provider. Their ridership is lumped with the rest of the transportation data of JAX. They claimed over 200,000 rides in 2024, the year they took over Saluki Express operations, which nearly doubled their ridership number from 2023.

== History ==
=== The Beck Era ===
Saluki Express began providing service at the beginning of the 1995 fall semester. The project was overseen by the Saluki Mass Transit Advisory Board. The university contracted Beck Bus Transportation to provide the actual bus services. The Carbondale City Council also provided additional funding. The first year of operation was considered a success. In 2004, they announced a record-setting ridership of 326,403. In 2005, the university announced they would be increasing police patrol on Saluki Express busses. There was no official reasoning for the decision apart from it a public affair opportunity for campus police. In 2010, a Saluki Express bus was involved in an accident where it crashed into the side of a movie theater. There were often issues of routes being adjusted to eliminated to fit with SIU's locations. This was notable in 2012 when Saluki Express eliminated their route to Carterville after the relocation of their rebuilt Transportation Education Center to outside of Southern Illinois Airport. Saluki Express has also had to deal with constant threats of budget and service cuts as well as route eliminations.

=== The Rides Era ===
In 2018, it was decided that Rides Mass Transit District would be contracted to operate Saluki Express beginning in June of that year. This opened the campus up to the use of RMTD's services and there was word of a potential app in development for students. 2019 saw many changes which included enhancing safety measures as well as more route changes and a new QR freature for easier boarding. They would improve on the QR method by allowing for over the phone fare payments via app for non-SIU riders. However, bad news came for Saluki Express and Rides Mass Transit District after a revision based on the 2020 Census when the United States Census Bureau and Federal Transit Administration rewrote the qualifications for urbanized zones which saw the dissolving of the Carbondale Urbanized Zone and separation of Carbondale from Marion and the rest of Williamson County. This resulted in a loss of $2 million in funding. This also meant that RMTD as well as Jackson County Mass Transit District would need to streamline any services to make up for the loss. This would ultimately result in the decision of RMTD surrendering their Saluki Express responsibilities to JCMTD.

=== The JAX Era ===
Jackson County Mass Transit District would begin operation of the Saluki Express at the start of the fall 2024 semester. This new joint venture saw the rebranding of Saluki Express routes and continuation of night services. Rides Mass Transit District would still serve SIU as a stop on their Marion-Carbondale Intercity Route. The new Saluki Express era of JCMTD also saw them rebrand into JAX Mass Transit. Another improvement would be made with the development of an app that allowed Saluki Express riders to see route information including schedules, stop times, and buses in real time.

== Service ==
Saluki Express has free access to four of the five primary fixed routes provided by JAX. This includes the Saluki, Nile, Sahara, and Pyramid Route. Any other routes provided by JAX including the Big Muddy Route from Carbondale to Murphysboro, seasonal routes like the Southern Illinois Access Route (SOAR), and any rural routes will need to be paid for by SIU students and staff. Other services provided include the Saluki Night Shuttle which provides after hours on-demand transportation from 7:00P.M. to 12:00A.M. everyday for SIU students.

=== Routes ===
DISCLAIMER: All routes are subject to temporary or permanent modification at the discretion of JAX and may be inaccurately represented on their maps or the following Wikipedia route tables.

Route	Termini			Course	Interval	Availability
Route	Start		End	Course	Interval	Availability
Saluki	from SIU Student Center	↔	to Engineering Crosswalk	SIU Student Center (East Side); Neely Hall; Logan and Park (East Side); The Pointe; Aspen Court; Brookside Apartments; Georgetown Apartments; University Village; Student Health Center; Mill and Lincoln; College and Illinois; College Street Apartments (North Side); Poplar and Mill (West Side); Northwest Annex at WHAM; Communications Building; Thompson Point and Lincoln (South Side); Engineering Crosswalk (South Side)	30 minutes	Monday-Friday (6:30AM–7:26PM)
Nile	from Evergreen Terrace	↔	to SIU Equine Center	Evergreen Terrace (Entrance); Evergreen Terrace (Exit); Westwood Apartments; The Reserve; Southern Illinois Research Park; SIU Student Center (West Side); Engineering Crosswalk (North Side); Thompson Point and Lincoln (North Side); Life Science; Law School; McLaffery Annex (West Side); SIU Equine Center	30 minutes	Monday-Friday (7:00AM–7:12PM)
Sahara	from Saluki Apartments	↔	to Wall Street at Walgreens	Saluki Apartments; Wall and Park; Wall and East Campus Drive; Wall and Pleasant Hill Road; Westwood Apartments; The Reserve; Evergreen Terrace (Entrance); Evergreen Terrace (Exit); McLaffery Annex (East Side); Thompson Point and Lincoln (South Side); Engineering Crosswalk (South Side); SIU Student Center (East Side); Charlotte West Stadium; Grand Avenue Mall; Aspen Court; Brookside Apartments; Superblock; Lewis Lane and Walnut; Walnut at Sports Blast; Carbondale Community High School; Kroger; Walmart; Dollar Tree; Harbor Freight; Wall Street at Walgreens	1 hour	Monday-Sunday (7:05AM–7:24PM)
Pyramid	from SIU Student Center	↔	to Engineering Crosswalk	SIU Student Center (East Side); Charlotte West Stadium; Student Health Center; Mill and Lincoln; Illinois and Freeman; SIMMS; Sycamore and Michaels; Five Rings Armory; Sycamore and Glenview; S.I. Motorsports; Transportation Education Center/S.I. Airport; Murdale Shopping Center; Old West Main Apartments; Schnucks; Poplar and Cherry; Poplar and Mill; Carbondale Towers; Communications Building; Thompson Point and Lincoln (South Side); Engineering Crosswalk (South Side)	1 hour	Monday-Sunday (7:32AM–7:24PM)

== See also ==
- List of bus transit systems in the United States
- JAX Mass Transit
- Rides Mass Transit District
