= Air Illinois =

Regional airline of the United States

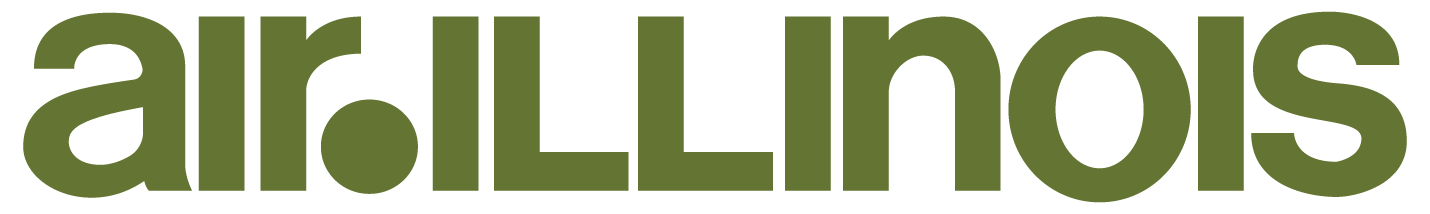
IATA	ICAO	Call sign
UX	AIL	ILLINOIS
- Founded: 1970; 56 years ago
- Ceased operations: 1983; 43 years ago (Grounded, filed for bankruptcy in 1984)
- Hubs: Abraham Lincoln Capital Airport; Southern Illinois Airport; St. Louis International Airport
- Headquarters: Carbondale, Illinois

Air Illinois (IATA: UX) was a regional airline based in Carbondale, Illinois.

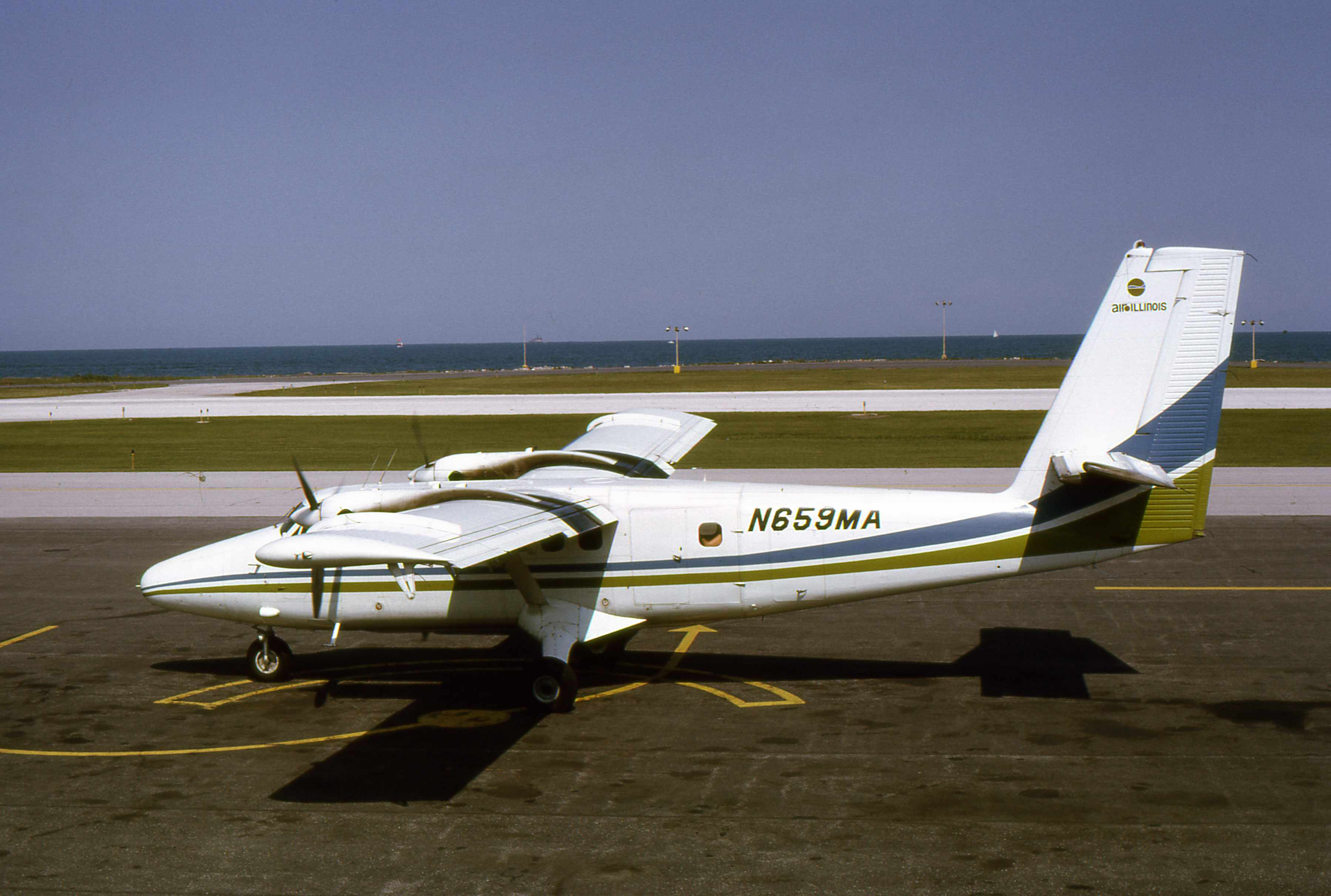
An Air Illinois DHC-6 Twin Otter at Meigs Field. This aircraft would have later crashed as Downeast Airlines Flight 46 in 1973

== History ==
Founded in 1970 in Carbondale, Illinois, Air Illinois primarily operated small twin turboprop aircraft such as the de Havilland Canada DHC-6 Twin Otter. By 1978, the company acquired two 44-seat Hawker Siddeley HS 748 turboprops (tail registrations N748LL and N749LL), which were mostly used to connect Springfield, Illinois, with Chicago's Meigs Field. The HS 748 was the largest aircraft to use the lakefront airport on a regular basis. By far the company's most utilized aircraft was the Twin Otter, an eighteen-passenger aircraft noted for short field take-offs and landings (STOL) that was truly the company's workhorse. The company's two letter identifier was UX although the Official Airline Guide (OAG) states that Air Illinois also used the QX code for its stand-alone intrastate airline operation in Illinois between Chicago Meigs Field and the state capital in Springfield.

In December 1977, Air Illinois purchased the small Handley Page Jetstream fleet of South Central Air Transport (SCAT). SCAT was based in Natchez, Mississippi and was incorporated by Andrew Peabody in 1971 to replace Southern Airways' Martin 4-0-4 flights between Natchez, Jackson and New Orleans. By 1976 SCAT flew between New Orleans and Jackson, Mississippi, New Orleans and Gulfport-Biloxi as well as on a route from New Orleans to Birmingham, Alabama with stops in Fort Walton Beach, Florida, Panama City, Florida, Montgomery, Alabama, and Mobile, Alabama. SCAT flew three of the 18 passenger Handley Page HP.137 MK1 Jetstream and two of the Frakes Pratt & Whitney PT-6 modified HP.137's (tail registrations N11DN and N7RJ). The airline tried to become a replacement carrier for Southern, but faced challenges trying to compete with Southern's DC-9s in the New Orleans market. SCAT ended airline service during the summer of 1977.

In July 1982 the company leased two British Aircraft Corp. British Aircraft Corporation BAC One-Eleven (tail registrations N1542 and N1547) 74-passenger, twin jet aircraft from USAir, which were utilized mainly on scheduled routes from Springfield, Illinois, St. Louis, Missouri, Evansville, Indiana, and Waterloo and Cedar Rapids, Iowa to Chicago O'Hare. In addition, the company entered into agreements with the federal government and an Atlantic City-based casino to operate charter flights.

The company was grounded after a fatal crash in October 1983, and filed for bankruptcy in April 1984, never to return.

== Accidents and incidents ==
In October 1983, Air Illinois Flight 710 flying between Chicago, Illinois and Carbondale, Illinois via Springfield, Illinois crashed in poor weather near Pinckneyville, Illinois. Three crew members and seven passengers lost their lives.

Several weeks after the accident, with initial findings from the National Transportation Safety Board investigation of the deadly incident, the Federal Aviation Administration grounded the company, ordering it to update operations to meet minimal safety standards. The NTSB determined the cause to be pilot error after the plane's generators failed 90 seconds after takeoff from Springfield, with the crew electing to "push on" to Carbondale, crashing in a pasture when the plane lost all electrical power.

Over the final quarter of 1983, the privately-held company had lost US$1 million (equivalent to $3.2 million in 2025), and by January 1984 had arranged a tentative sale to commuter airline Air Midwest. Measures were taken to bring the safety standards up to federal requirements. Most company employees were placed on furlough and after an extensive rewrite of the company's operations manual the FAA granted an operating certificate for FAR part 121 flight operations which was composed of jet service utilizing their pair of BAC One-Eleven aircraft. In February 1984, Air Midwest dropped its plans to acquire Air Illinois. The operating certificate for the most lucrative part of their original operation, served by its fleet of turboprop aircraft, was under FAR part 135 rules, which did not meet approval FAA until March 1984. These events, along with substantially lower passenger loads, led Air Illinois' owner to cease operations in April 1984 and file for Chapter 11 bankruptcy.

== Cities served ==
Air Illinois served the following destinations during its existence; however, not all of these destinations were served at the same time. Those destinations noted in bold received BAC One-Eleven jet service.

- Alton, Illinois
- Bloomington, Indiana
- Burlington, Iowa
- Cape Girardeau, Missouri
- Carbondale, Illinois - airline headquarters
- **Cedar Rapids, Iowa**
- Centralia, Illinois
- Champaign-Urbana, Illinois
- Chicago, Illinois - Meigs Field (CGX) and **O'Hare Airport** (ORD)
- Columbia, Missouri
- Columbus, Nebraska
- Decatur, Illinois
- **Evansville, Indiana**
- Jacksonville, Illinois
- Jefferson City, Missouri
- Jonesboro, Arkansas
- Lake of the Ozarks, Missouri
- Lincoln, Nebraska
- Memphis, Tennessee
- Mount Vernon, Illinois
- Nashville, Tennessee
- Natchez, Mississippi
- Paducah, Kentucky
- Peoria, Illinois
- Quincy, Illinois
- **Springfield, Illinois**
- **St. Louis, Missouri**
- Waterloo, Iowa

== Fleet ==
Air Illinois was unique in the fact that during most of its existence it did not operate any aircraft that had been manufactured in the U.S. The majority of its aircraft were built either in the United Kingdom or Canada. The exceptions were two leased Beechcraft 99A aircraft in 1980, N949K & N1924T

- 2 – Beechcraft 99A Airliner
- 4 – British Aircraft Corporation BAC One-Eleven (only jet aircraft type operated by the airline)
- 6 – de Havilland Canada DHC-6 Twin Otter, one former Air Illinois Twin Otter crashed
- 7 – Handley Page HP.137 Jetstream
- 2 – Hawker Siddeley HS 748

== See also ==
- List of defunct airlines of the United States
