= JAX Mass Transit =

Provider of mass transportation in Jackson County, Illinois

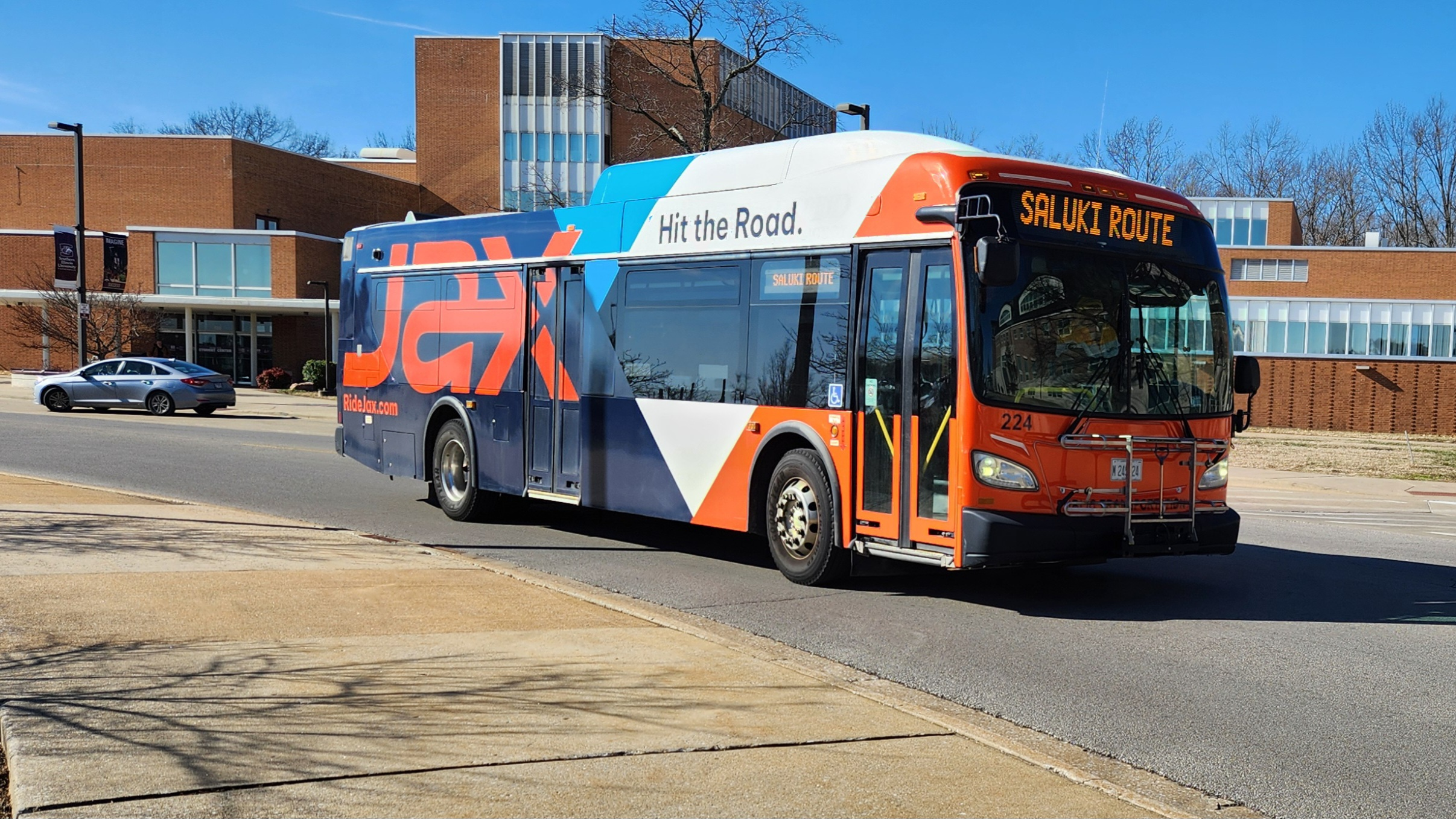
- A JAX bus seen on January 2026
- Formerly: Jackson County Mass Transit District (2002-2024)
- Founded: 1992
- Commenced operation: 2002
- Headquarters: 975 Charles Rd
- Service area: Jackson County, Illinois
- Service type: Bus service, paratransit
- Routes: 5
- Hubs: Southern Illinois Multimodal Station
- Fleet: 26 buses 3 paratransit vans
- Annual ridership: 110,175 (2023)
- Website: ridejax.com

JAX Mass Transit is a provider of mass transportation in Carbondale, Illinois with five routes serving the region. They also operate Saluki Express, which provides transportation to the students and staff of Southern Illinois University Carbondale. As of 2023, the system provided 110,175 rides over 23,615 annual vehicle revenue hours with the JAX themselves claiming 26 buses of varying size as well as 3 paratransit vans. The service provided by JAX in Carbondale is complemented by Rides Mass Transit District, South Central Illinois Mass Transit District, and Shawnee Mass Transit District.

== History ==
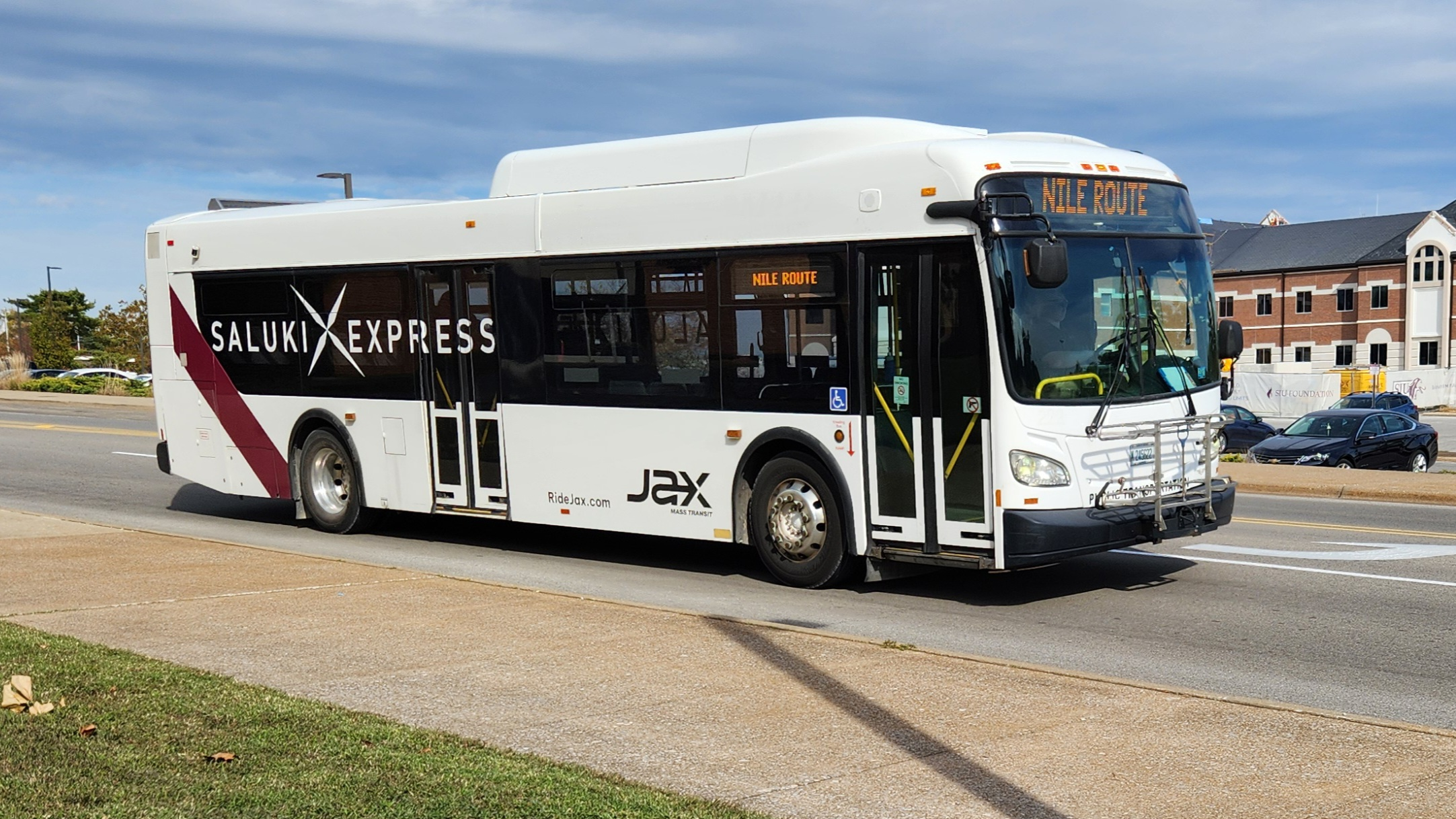
A JAX bus featuring Saluki Express branding

Public transit in Jackson County began with horsecars in 1905, with the Murphysboro Street Railway Co. In 1908, the horsecars were replaced with streetcars, which in turn were replaced by buses in 1927. In 1992, the Jackson County Board founded what would become the Jackson County Mass Transit District for the sake of providing public transportation across the county. In 2002, JCMTD had finally began its first rides. In 2019, the agency began planning on a new operations and maintenance facility in Carbondale. As part of a Rebuild Illinois grant, the agency received funding for the new facility in 2023, along with funding to build an operations and administrative office in Murphysboro. In 2024, JCMTD took over operations of the Saluki Express service in Carbondale previously operated by the Rides Mass Transit District. This also saw the creation of 4 new fixed-routes based on the old Saluki Express Routes. In October of the same year, the agency announced it would be changing its name from Jackson County Mass Transit District to JAX Mass Transit. In November, they introduced a new app to assist passengers with fixed route schedules and bus tracking as well as the Big Muddy Route which provides Carbondale access to Murphysboro.

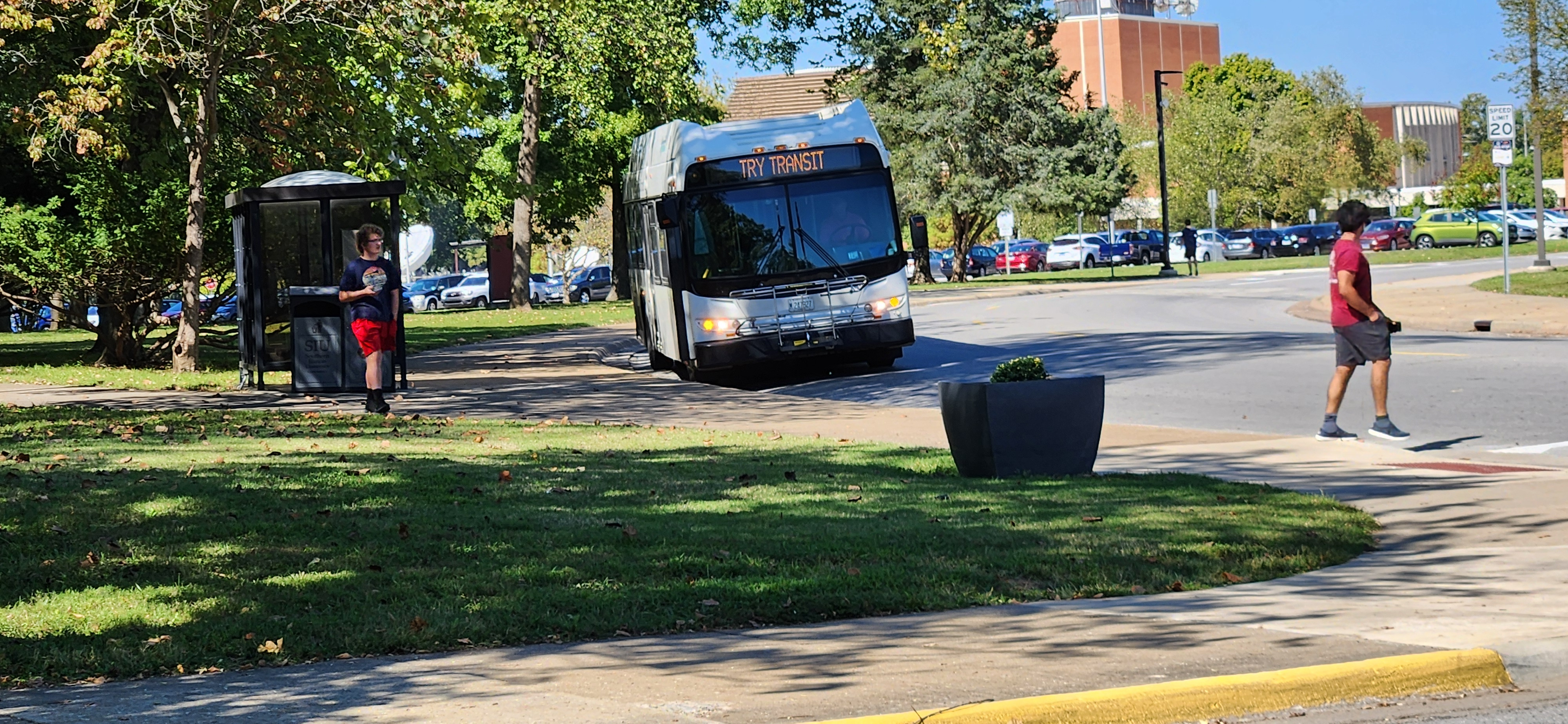
A typical JAX bus stop on the campus of Southern Illinois University Carbondale

== Service ==
JAX operates five deviated fixed-route bus services, four of which are Saluki Express routes. Three of these routes operate within Carbondale, while two operate between Carbondale and Murphysboro. Riders can board a bus at multiple locations in Carbondale, five locations in Murphysboro, or schedule a ride from a different location. JAX also provides a seasonal service called the Southern Illinois Access Route (SOAR) which operates from June to September. SOAR serves as a scenic route that takes riders to some of the more nature-oriented parts of Jackson County. Riders can be picked up at Evergreen Terrace, the SIU Recreation Center, or the Southern Illinois Multimodal Stations (SIMMS). SOAR features stops at the Touch of Nature Outdoor Education Center, Giant City State Park, the Makanda Boardwalk, and Cedar Lake.

Other services provided by JAX includes various microtransit services such as the Saluki Night Shuttle which provides after hours on-demand transportation from 7:00P.M. to 12:00A.M. everyday. JAX also provides paratransit services for Carbondale everyday 7:00A.M to 7:30P.M. and Murphysboro weekdays 7:00A.M. to 5:00P.M. for any eligible riders. The paratransit service mirrors the regular fixed routes provided by JAX. JAX also has rural routes to help provide inter-city access to people outside of Carbondale and Murphysboro. Stops for rural routes can be found in Ava, Campbell Hill, Dowell, De Soto, Elkville, Grand Tower, Gorham, Makanda, and Vergennes.

Hours of regular operation for the system are Monday through Friday from 7:00 A.M. to 7:30P.M. and Weekends from 7:00 A.M. to 7:30 P.M. depending on the route. Regular fares are $2.00.

=== Fixed Routes ===
DISCLAIMER: All routes are subject to temporary or permanent modification at the discretion of JAX and may be inaccurately represented on their maps or the following Wikipedia route tables.

Route	Termini			Course	Interval	Availability
Route	Start		End	Course	Interval	Availability
Saluki	from SIU Student Center	↔	to Engineering Crosswalk	SIU Student Center (East Side); Neely Hall; Logan and Park (East Side); The Pointe; Aspen Court; Brookside Apartments; Georgetown Apartments; University Village; Student Health Center; Mill and Lincoln; College and Illinois; College Street Apartments (North Side); Poplar and Mill (West Side); Northwest Annex at WHAM; Communications Building; Thompson Point and Lincoln (South Side); Engineering Crosswalk (South Side)	30 minutes	Monday-Friday (6:30AM-7:26PM)
Nile	from Evergreen Terrace	↔	to SIU Equine Center	Evergreen Terrace (Entrance); Evergreen Terrace (Exit); Westwood Apartments; The Reserve; Southern Illinois Research Park; SIU Student Center (West Side); Engineering Crosswalk (North Side); Thompson Point and Lincoln (North Side); Life Science; Law School; McLaffery Annex (West Side); SIU Equine Center	30 minutes	Monday-Friday (7:00AM-7:12PM)
Sahara	from Saluki Apartments	↔	to Wall Street at Walgreens	Saluki Apartments; Wall and Park; Wall and East Campus Drive; Wall and Pleasant Hill Road; Westwood Apartments; The Reserve; Evergreen Terrace (Entrance); Evergreen Terrace (Exit); McLaffery Annex (East Side); Thompson Point and Lincoln (South Side); Engineering Crosswalk (South Side); SIU Student Center (East Side); Charlotte West Stadium; Grand Avenue Mall; Aspen Court; Brookside Apartments; Superblock; Lewis Lane and Walnut; Walnut at Sports Blast; Carbondale Community High School; Kroger; Walmart; Dollar Tree; Harbor Freight; Wall Street at Walgreens	1 hour	Monday-Sunday (7:00AM-7:24PM)
Pyramid	from SIU Student Center	↔	to Engineering Crosswalk	SIU Student Center (East Side); Charlotte West Stadium; Student Health Center; Mill and Lincoln; Illinois and Freeman; SIMMS; Sycamore and Michaels; Five Rings Armory; Sycamore and Glenview; S.I. Motorsports; Transportation Education Center/S.I. Airport; Murdale Shopping Center; Old West Main Apartments; Schnucks; Poplar and Cherry; Poplar and Mill; Carbondale Towers; Communications Building; Thompson Point and Lincoln (South Side); Engineering Crosswalk (South Side)	1 hour	Monday-Sunday (7:30AM-7:24PM)
Big Muddy	from SIMMS	↔	to Shawnee Health Services	Student Center (East Side); SIMMS; Emma Hayes Community Center; Student Center (West Side); Saluki Gymnastics; Jackson County Health Department; Jackson County Courthouse	1 hour	Monday-Friday (8:00AM-5:00PM)

=== Rural Routes ===
Route	Termini			Course
Route	Start		End	Course
Monday	from Penny's Perks	↔	to SIMMS	Penny's Perks (9:45AM); Elkville Christian Church (10:10AM); De Soto City Parking (10:30AM); SIMMS (11:00AM / 3:30PM); De Soto City Parking (4:00PM); Elkville Christian Church (4:15PM); Penny's Perks (4:30PM)
Tuesday	from Campbell Hill Community Center	↔	to Murphysboro Food Pantry	Campbell Hill Community Center (9:50AM); Gabby's on Main (10:15AM); Murphysboro Food pantry (11:00AM / 3:20PM); Gabby's on Main (4:00PM); Campbell Hill Community Center (4:15PM)
Wednesday	from Vergennes Village Office Parking	↔	to Murphysboro Food Pantry	Vergennes Village Office Parking (9:45AM); Murphysboro Food pantry (10:20AM / 3:20PM); Vergennes Village Office Parking (4:00PM)
Thursday	from Makanda Downtown	↔	to SIU Student Center	Makanda Downtown (9:45AM); Dollar General (South 51) (10:15AM); SIU Student Center (East Side) (10:25AM / 3:45PM); Dollar General (South 51) (4:00PM); Makanda Downtown (4:30PM)
Friday	from Grand Tower Townsend Civic Center	↔	to Murphysboro Food Pantry	Grand Tower Townsend Civic Center (9:45AM); Gorham Post Office (10:00AM); Murphysboro Food pantry (10:30AM / 3:20PM); Gorham Post Office (3:50PM); Grand Tower Townsend Civic Center (4:15PM)

=== Seasonal Routes ===
Route	Termini			Course	Length	Availability	Term
Route	Start		End	Course	Length	Availability	Term
SOAR Departure	from Evergreen Terrace	↔	to Cedar Lake Boat Ramp	Evergreen Terrace (Entrance); SIU Student Recreation Center; SIMMS; Touch of Nature; Post Oak Trail Head (ADA); Devil's Standtable Trail Head Shelter; Triliam Trail Head Shelter; Makanda Boardwalk; Cedar Lake Beach; Cedar Lake Boat Ramp	1 hour and 30 minutes	Saturday (10:00AM-11:30AM)	June through September
SOAR Return	from Cedar Lake Boat Ramp	↔	to Evergreen Terrace	Cedar Lake Boat Ramp; Cedar Lake Beach; Makanda Boardwalk; Triliam Trail Head Shelter; Devil's Standtable Trail Head Shelter; Post Oak Trail Head (ADA); Touch of Nature; SIMMS; SIU Student Recreation Center; Evergreen Terrace (Entrance)	1 hour and 30 minutes	Saturday (3:00PM-4:30PM)	June through September

== Fixed route ridership ==
The ridership statistics shown here are of the deviated fixed route services operated by JAX from 2013 to 2023.

== See also ==
- List of bus transit systems in the United States
- Rides Mass Transit District
- Shawnee Mass Transit District
- South Central Illinois Mass Transit District
