= Air Illinois Flight 710 =

1983 aviation accident in Illinois

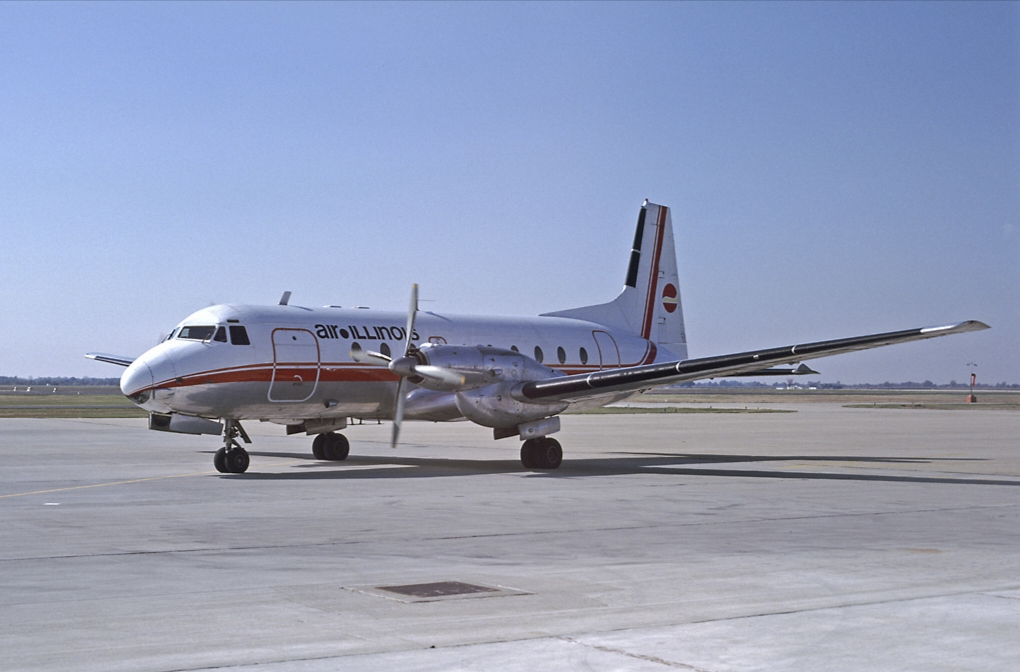
- N748LL, the aircraft involved in the accident, pictured in 1982

Accident
- Date: October 11, 1983
- Summary: Electrical failure aggravated by pilot error
- Site: Near Pinckneyville, Illinois; 38°9′N 89°19′W

Aircraft
- Aircraft type: Hawker Siddeley HS 748
- Operator: Air Illinois
- Call sign: ILLINOIS 710
- Registration: N748LL
- Flight origin: Meigs Field, Chicago
- Stopover: Springfield Airport
- Destination: Southern Illinois Airport
- Occupants: 10
- Passengers: 7
- Crew: 3
- Fatalities: 10
- Survivors: 0

Air Illinois Flight 710 was a scheduled passenger flight from Chicago to Carbondale, Illinois, United States. On the night of October 11, 1983, the Hawker Siddeley HS 748 operating the Air Illinois flight crashed near Pinckneyville, Illinois, due to the flightcrew's mismanagement of electrical generator and distribution problems, noting the captain's habit of violating safety regulations in order to arrive on time. All 10 passengers and crew were killed in the accident. The airline was grounded until it proved it could meet minimal FAA safety standards, returning to service in steps from December 1983 to March 1984; in April 1984, Air Illinois folded, declaring bankruptcy.

== Accident sequence ==
The flight flew from Chicago to Springfield, Illinois uneventfully, but when it touched down at Springfield Airport, the flight had been delayed by 45 minutes. At 20:20 local time, the aircraft took off from Springfield. Roughly 1.5 minutes after takeoff, the crew reported a "slight electrical problem" and would keep air traffic control "advised". The NTSB concluded that the first officer then mistakenly pushed the right generator (which was fully functioning) isolate button, instead of the left generator (the problem generator) isolate button, without bothering to check the gauges and warning lights to confirm which generator was the problem; this was attributed, and confirmed on the CVR by the first officer's statement to the captain, to the right generator on that aircraft having had a recent history of maintenance issues. Twelve minutes after takeoff, the first officer reported to the captain that the left generator was "totally dead" and that, while he had corrected his error of isolating the right generator, he now found that it was producing voltage but wouldn't stay online. Roughly 20 minutes after takeoff, the crew shut off excess lights in the cabin, but did not further reduce the electrical load on the aircraft's battery. Ultimately the battery was depleted, resulting in the failure of the aircraft's flight instruments, and communication and navigation radios. At 20:52, the captain decided to descend to 2,400 feet, from there the aircraft slowly descended into a hilly pasture area and banked right as the co-pilot used a flashlight to determine the location of the plane. The crew may have attempted a forced landing before the aircraft crashed, or a disoriented pilot mistook strip lighting at a mine for approach lights at Carbondale Airport. All ten on board perished.

The aircraft was heard by John Fisher and his wife Arilla circling over their property a couple of times. Arilla Fisher said that it had been raining pretty hard at the time of impact. She also said "The aircraft circled two times. It made a lot more noise the second time. I ran to the back porch. I saw one flash and heard a lot of noise. [John and I] could smell gas and fuel." The flash was reported to have been a brief flash fire from the spewing fuel and no explosion had taken place. The various victims were strewn across a quarter mile radius of the crash site. The largest recoverable section of the aircraft was the baggage compartment and the landing gear wheel section.

== Investigation ==
Accident investigators determined the probable cause to be:

The captain's decision to continue the flight toward the more distant destination airport after the loss of d.c. electrical power from both aircraft generators instead of returning to the nearby departure airport. The captain's decision was adversely affected by self-imposed psychological factors which led him to assess inadequately the aircraft's battery endurance after the loss of generator power and the magnitude of the risks involved in continuing to the destination airport. Contributing to the accident was the airline management's failure to provide and the FAA's failure to assure an adequate company recurrent flight crew training program which contributed to the captain's inability to assess properly the battery endurance of the aircraft before making the decision to continue, and led to the inability of the captain and the first officer to cope promptly and correctly with the aircraft's electrical malfunction.

The investigation revealed the captain, considered an "average pilot", was a "one-man operation" and did not welcome input from the co-pilot and was in a hurry to return to Carbondale after being on duty all day. The report said the captain had a habit of violating safety regulations in order to arrive on time, even disabling safety devices in order to overspeed the aircraft.

One of the three NTSB investigators, Patricia A. Goldman, filed a concurring statement of the captain's initial bad decision, but dissented in that the report placed too little blame on the fundamental decision-making error by the captain – when the electrical problem presented just 90 seconds after takeoff from Springfield – to continue to Carbondale as the sole probable cause, with the other items being contributing factors:

While the accident report correctly identifies training and surveillance, I believe that inclusion of these items in the probable cause statement obscures and detracts from the basic reason the accident occurred and the attendant safety lesson. The pilot should never have continued the flight to the destination airport, but should have returned to the nearby airport on realizing that electrical d.c. power had been lost."

== Cockpit voice recording ==
Cockpit voice recording transcript

CAP: Captain (Lester R. Smith, aged 32),[5] FO: First Officer (Frank S. Tudor, aged 28),[5] DEP: Springfield Departure control, KCC: Kansas City Control, ATT: Cabin Attendant

TIME: 20:23:54

FO: Well, the left one is totally dead, the right one is putting out voltage but I can't get a load on it.

CAP: Well, okay, Frank.

FO: What are we going to do?

CAP: Ah, let's concentrate on the inside here...

FO: I got the switch on.

CAP: What did you do, anything?

FO: Naw, reset the RCCBs, (Note: Reverse current circuit breakers) I tried to select each side, isolate the side.

CAP: Yeah.

FO: Zero voltage and amps on the left side. The right one is putting out 27.5 but I can't get it on the line.

CAP: Okay.

DEP: Illinois 710, contact Kansas City Center on 124.3.

FO: 24.3, good night.

DEP: Good night.

FO: Ah, battery power is going down pretty fast... Kansas City, Illinois 710, 3,000.

KCC: Illinois 710, Kansas City Center, roger.

TIME: 20:26:21

FO: Ah, ya got, ah 22 volts. There's the right one.

CAP: Okay. Ah, turn the load shedding on so they can read back there, and turn of the lights, main lights.

FO: Turn off the wing lights, is that what you said? I didn't hear you.

CAP: Naw, I said I turned the load shedding switch back on so...

FO: Oh.

CAP: She can use the reading lights only back there.

FO: Okay. Still working Kansas City here.

CAP: Alright, I'll talk to this man here. Kansas City, Illinois 710.

KCC: Illinois 710, go ahead.

CAP: Ah, we are kind of having an unusual request here, ah, we would like to go to 2,000 feet and if we have to go to VFR (Note: Visual flight rules) that's fine, but, ah, like to, ah, like you to keep your eye on us if you can.

KCC: Illinois 710, I can't clear you down to 2,000, I don't think I could keep you on radar even if I have to, if you went down that far.

CAP:All right, fine, thank you... How are our bats there?

FO: Ah, ah, 22.5.

CAP: Okay, beacons off.

FO: Okay.

CAP: Nav lights are off. Are you using these lights here?

FO: I'll get that one down.

CAP: Both generator failures, here, see...

FO: I'm going to try something here, I'm going to isolate both sides and see what happens.

[Sound of switches]

FO: Want me to go to emergency so you can get some - get your Grimes lights? (Note: Shorthand for the external lighting system, taken from the Grimes Manufacturing Company, an American manufacturer of aircraft lighting systems)

CAP: No, I want it back the way it was. If it does reset. You see, you're shuttin' off all the electricity to the back end that way, lighting and everything.

FO: Yeah.

CAP: All right.

FO: You want me to leave it the way it is then?

CAP: Yeah, yeah that will be good. Keep an eye on these boost pumps, though.

FO: Okay.

TIME: 20:30:52

FO: Are you going to try to do it separately?

CAP: No I-just leave it the way they are, Frank. They'll be fine.

FO: Roger that. Carbondale is 2,000, two, light rain and fog.

CAP: Okay.

FO: Winds are 150 at 10.

CAP: Okay, got it.

FO: Do you want me to kill any pitot heat or anything??

CAP: I would leave the pitot heat on, it will be all right.

FO: All right.

CAP: Unless you see that thing really depletin', which I don't believe it is. Is it really bad, really rapidly?

FO: No, not too bad. Those inverters take a lot of power.

CAP: Yeah.

FO: All I've got on here is the transponder and one nav, that's all I've got on.

CAP: Okay, swell. DME, (Note: Distance measuring equipment) we don't need that.

FO: Radar's off, we've only got one fan on.

CAP: Okay.
CAP: Are you going to be able to operate all right now with what you have back there?

ATT: (unintelligible) ...people want to know...

CAP: They want to? We have a little bit of an electrical problem here, but we are going to continue to Carbondale. We had to shut off all excess lights.

ATT: I've only got the reading lights, the front light by the bathroom and the baggage light, and the entrance light.

CAP: Okay.

ATT: And one light by the john. What time do we get there? Is that rain?

CAP: What time did we lift off?

FO: There about on the hour.

ATT: Okay.

CAP: Do you want to use the DME?

FO: All right.

CAP: Oh, on that checklist, other than those RCCB's then, did, ah, has been reviewed then, okay?

FO: Well, lets see here, ah, RCCB's port and starboard, says trip those... that's about it you know, just switch both of those of and try to reset.

CAP: Okay.

FO: Which I've already done.

TIME: 20:36:03

FO: This has just not been our day, Les.

CAP: No. That's six of one, half a dozen of another. How are we doing on them volts now?

FO: Still pretty good, 20, 21.5.

CAP: All right, ah...

FO: (unintelligible)...should be last to Carbondale.

CAP: I want to use this [radar] here briefly. As a matter of fact, could you, ah, tune...

FO: Take a while to warm up.

CAP: Tune that in for us there, ah, there was some old guys who were complaining over there around Kubik, I think we're below it all together here.
CAP: Kansas City, Illinois 710.

KCC: Illinois 710, contact Kansas City Center at 127.7.

CAP: Okay. Well.

FO: It's going to take a few minutes to warm up, I think.

CAP: Okay.

FO: I got it.

CAP: Need a, would like him to give us a vector, I mean, if he got us okay, we want a vector direct to the marker.

FO: Okay. Kansas City, Illinois 710, 3,000.

KCC: Illinois 710, Kansas City Center, roger, maintain 3,000, altimeter at Scott 29.83.

FO: 29.83, ah, if you are able, vectors direct Cabbi.

KCC: Illinois 710, Kansas City Center, roger, present heading looks good.

FO: Okay. When we lost, ah, started losing the left one I reached up and hit the right RCCB, trying to isolate the right side, 'cause I assumed the problem was the right side, but they both still went off.

CAP: Well, also, too, when you were doing that you could see that I was losing my lighting here.

FO: Yeah.

CAP: And I was losing lighting in the cabin and it was going pitch dark back there. Don't want to scare the hell out of the people.

FO: Yeah, that's for sure.

CAP: Hey, it's working now, that looks like Carlyle there, either that or it's a hell of a shadow.

FO:Yeah, that's it - we're right on course, unbelievable.

CAP: Better stay away from them shadows, Frank... I suspect the circuit breaker tripped, right in the belly.

FO: Yeah, I was thinking the same thing, somethin' popped.

CAP: Whatever you do, don't, if you would, don't say anything to dispatch... don't say a fucking thing to them.

FO: Roger that.

CAP: Not nothing.

FO: You can plan on that, that's for sure. The less you tell them about anything the better off you are.

CAP: That's right.

TIME: 20:42:15

CAP: Can I get the ILS (Note: Instrument landing system) to Carbondale, please?

FO: Roger that.

CAP: Still doing okay up there, Frank?

FO: Yeah, it's at, ah, 20 volts.

CAP: Turn this thing off now.

FO: Okay.

KCC: Illinois 710, five degrees to the right until receiving Cabbi.

FO: Roger, five right to Cabbi. Well, get the boost pumps [going now]...The localiser should at least be doing something, getting anything at all over there?

CAP: Ah, I got the needle but, ah, little bit away too far away to see the flag.

FO: Want me to tune into Cabbi real quick?

CAP: Sure.

FO: To get a bearing on it.

CAP: It's not going to use that much power.

FO: Here we go.

CAP: Is that lightning off to your right side?

FO: Say again?

CAP: Most of that lightning is off to your right side, is it not?

FO: Yeah, it's on number two.

CAP: All right.

KCC: Air Illinois 710, contact Kansas City Center on frequency 125.3.

FO: 25.3 roger, Air Illinois 710.

KCC: Good night.

TIME:20:50:37

FO: I don't know if we've got enough juice to get out of this.

CAP: How come?... Squawk your radio failure.

KCC: Illinois 710, I've lost radar contact.

CAP: Know your radio failure code?

KCC: 710, Kansas City.

CAP: Frank, remember your radio failure...

FO: Yeah, I got it.

CAP: Squawk...

FO: Yeah.

KCC: Illinois 710, Kansas City, do you read?

CAP: Watch my altitude, I'm going to go down to 2,400?

FO: Okay.

CAP: Have you got a flashlight?

FO: Yeah.

CAP: Here we go. Do you want to shine it up here?

FO: What do you need?

CAP: Be ready for it.

FO: What do you need?

CAP: Just have it in your hand, if you will.

FO: Oh. Ah, we're losing everything, down to 13 volts.

CAP: Okay. Watch my altitude, Frank.

FO: Okay...2,400.

CAP: Do you have any instruments?

FO: Say again?

CAP: Do you have any instruments, do you have a horizon?

[The CVR ceases to operate here after the electrical failures spread to the voice recorder]

== Aftermath ==
Initial findings during the NTSB investigation led the Federal Aviation Administration to ground the airline, ordering it to update operations to meet minimal safety standards. Most company employees were placed on furlough and after an extensive rewrite of the company's operations manual, the FAA granted an operating certificate for flight operations for just its jet airplanes, a pair of BAC One-Eleven aircraft, which returned to service in December 1983. The larger fleet of turboprop aircraft did not qualify for an operating certificate until March 1984, by which time the privately owned company had lost over US$1 million (equivalent to $3.2 million in 2025) and a tentative sale to commuter airline Air Midwest had fallen through. Air Illinois folded in April 1984 and filed for Chapter 11 bankruptcy.

== In popular culture ==
The events of Air Illinois Flight 710 were featured in the 2022 episode "Pitch Black", of the Canadian-made, internationally distributed documentary series Mayday.
