= Southern Illinois Airport =

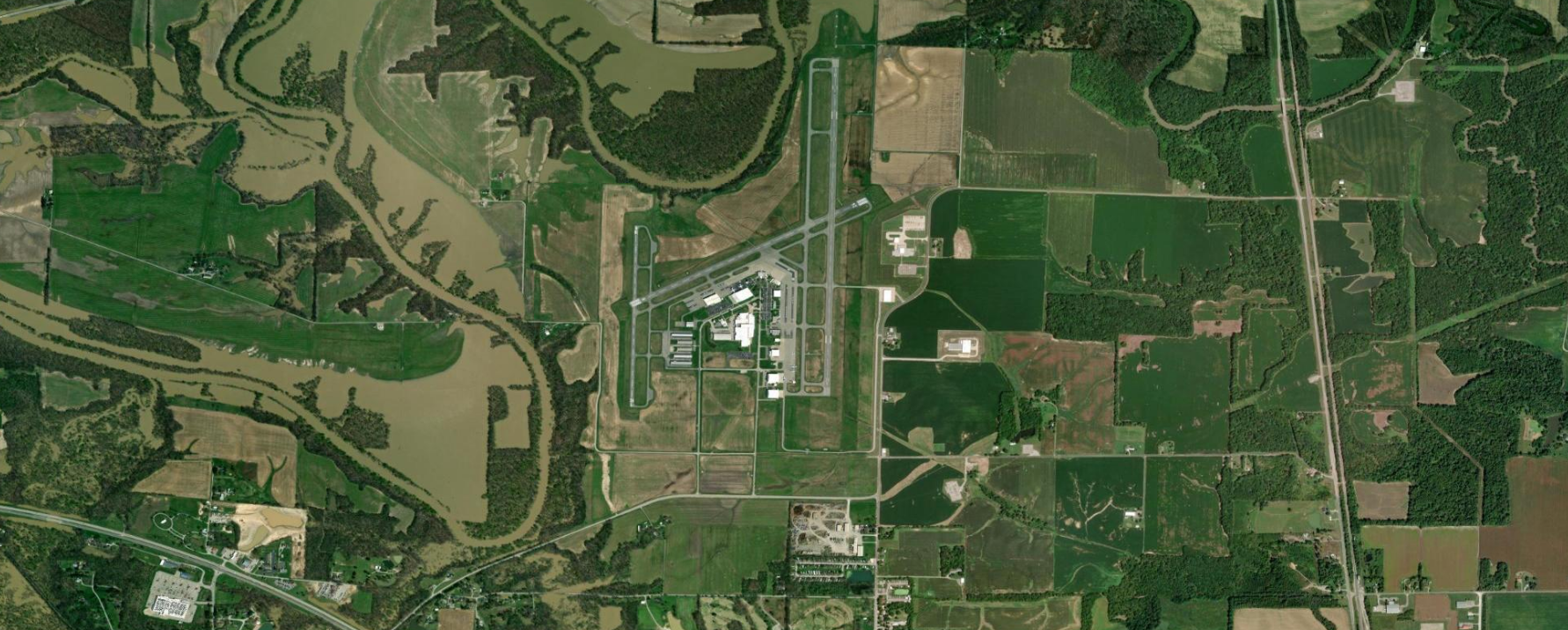
- IATA: MDH; ICAO: KMDH; FAA LID: MDH

Summary
- Airport type: Public
- Owner/Operator: Southern Illinois Airport Authority
- Serves: Carbondale / Murphysboro, Illinois
- Location: Jackson County, Illinois
- Opened: September 1950
- Elevation AMSL: 411 ft (125 m)
- Coordinates: 37°46′41″N 089°15′07″W
- Website: www.SIAirport.com

Map
- Location of airport in Illinois MDH (the United States)

Runways
Direction	Length		Surface
Direction	ft	m	Surface
6/24	4,163	1,269	Asphalt
18L/36R	6,506	1,983	Asphalt
18R/36L	3,498	1,066	Asphalt

Statistics
- Aircraft operations (2024): 117,697
- Based aircraft (2024): 84
- Source: Federal Aviation Administration, Illinois Department of Transportation

Southern Illinois Airport (IATA: MDH, ICAO: KMDH, FAA LID: MDH) is a public airport in DeSoto Township, Jackson County, Illinois, United States. It is located 3 nautical miles (5.6 km) northwest of the central business district of Carbondale and east of Murphysboro. This airport is included in the Federal Aviation Agency's (FAA) National Plan of Integrated Airport Systems for 2025–2029, which categorized it as a regional general aviation facility.

The airport opened in 1950 and was originally known as Murdale Airport.

The airport is owned and operated by Southern Illinois Airport Authority, a local governmental entity created under state law. A five-member board sets policy for the airport authority, and daily administration of the airport is carried out by an airport manager and staff. The board members are appointed by the mayors of Carbondale and Murphysboro and the chairman of the Jackson County Board and serve for five years on a staggered basis.

== Facilities and aircraft ==
Southern Illinois Airport covers an area of 1,200 acres (490 ha) at an elevation of 411 feet (125 m) above mean sea level. Three lighted, hard surface runways provide all-weather capability. A precision instrument approach is available on the airport's primary runway.

Runway	Dimensions	Surface	Status
6/24	4,163 x 100 feet (1,269 x 30 m)	Asphalt	In-use
18L/36R	6,506 x 100 feet (1,983 x 30 m)	Asphalt	In-use
18R/36L	3,498 x 60 feet (1,066 x 18 m)	Asphalt	In-use

For the 12-month period ending February 29, 2024, the airport had 117,697 aircraft operations, an average of 322 per day: 72% general aviation, 28% air taxi, less than 1% military and less than 1% commercial. In August 2024, there were 84 aircraft based at this airport: 70 single-engine, 7 multi-engine, 6 jet and 1 helicopter.

The airport has a Fixed-Base Operator (FBO) offering fuel and ground handling as well as hangars and parking. Flight training and aircraft maintenance and modifications are offered, as are pilot supplies, a courtesy car, and a restaurant.

The airport is capable of accommodating a variety of aircraft up to and including the Boeing 757. Sufficient aircraft ramps and tie-down spaces exist for a large and varied number of aircraft. Hangar space is available for based and transient aircraft up to and including the Gulfstream V.

Southern Illinois Airport is also the home operating base for Southern Illinois University's aviation flight and aviation technologies programs. A $63.3 million Transportation Education Center opened in fall 2012 on the south side of the airport. This edifice houses the Aviation Flight, Aviation Management, and Automotive Technologies programs under one roof. The TEC also houses flight and air traffic control simulator labs, classroom space, and vehicle storage/maintenance labs for automotive students. Nearby, an aviation test cell facility provides space for Aviation Technologies students to test piston- and turbine-powered aircraft engines.

An air traffic control tower operates daily from 7 am to 9 pm, and an ASOS weather facility operates on a 24-hour basis.

== Economic impact ==
Southern Illinois Airport makes a substantial contribution to the local economy.

Based upon a study commissioned by the Illinois Aeronautics Division, the airport contributes more than $13.8 million in direct and indirect benefits to the region on an annual basis. Today the airport employs more than 175 full and part-time employees with an annual payroll exceeding $3.3 million. Yearly expenditures in the local area by the airport and seven businesses located here are more than $2.5 million. The authors used a conservative multiplier of 1.7 to result in a total annual impact exceeding $13.8 million.

== Accidents and incidents ==
- On October 11, 1983, Air Illinois Flight 710 crashed while en route to Southern Illinois Airport. The plane was attempting to fly through a thunderstorm when it impacted the top of a ridge. The seven passengers and three crew on board were killed.
- On August 21, 2001, a Hoskins Quickie Q-200 was damaged during landing at Southern Illinois Airport. The airplane veered off the right side of the runway, and the left landing gear broke. A post accident investigation revealed the fiberglass tail-wheel spring had fractured just forward of the tailwheel swivel assembly, making lateral ground control impossible. The pilot and passenger on board were uninjured.
- On February 12, 2022, a Cessna 172 crashed while attempting to land at the Southern Illinois Airport. The plane impacted power lines on final short of the runway, impacting terrain soon after. The sole pilot on board, a student at Southern Illinois University, was taken to the hospital to be treated for non-life-threatening injuries.

== Ground transportation ==
Public transit service to the airport is provided by the Saluki Express, operated by Rides Mass Transit District.

== Gallery ==
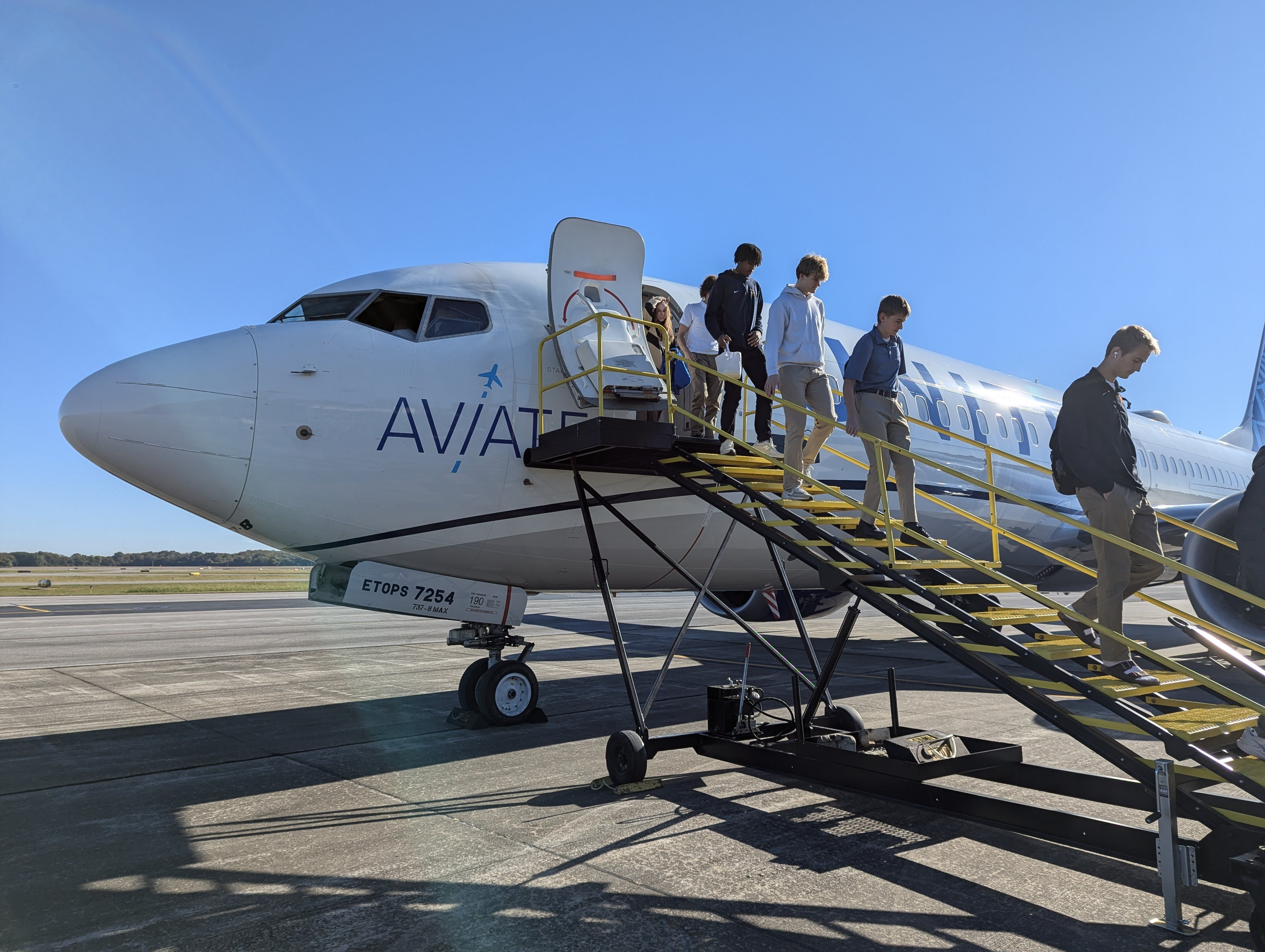
Students disembarking for SIU's 2024 United Career Day

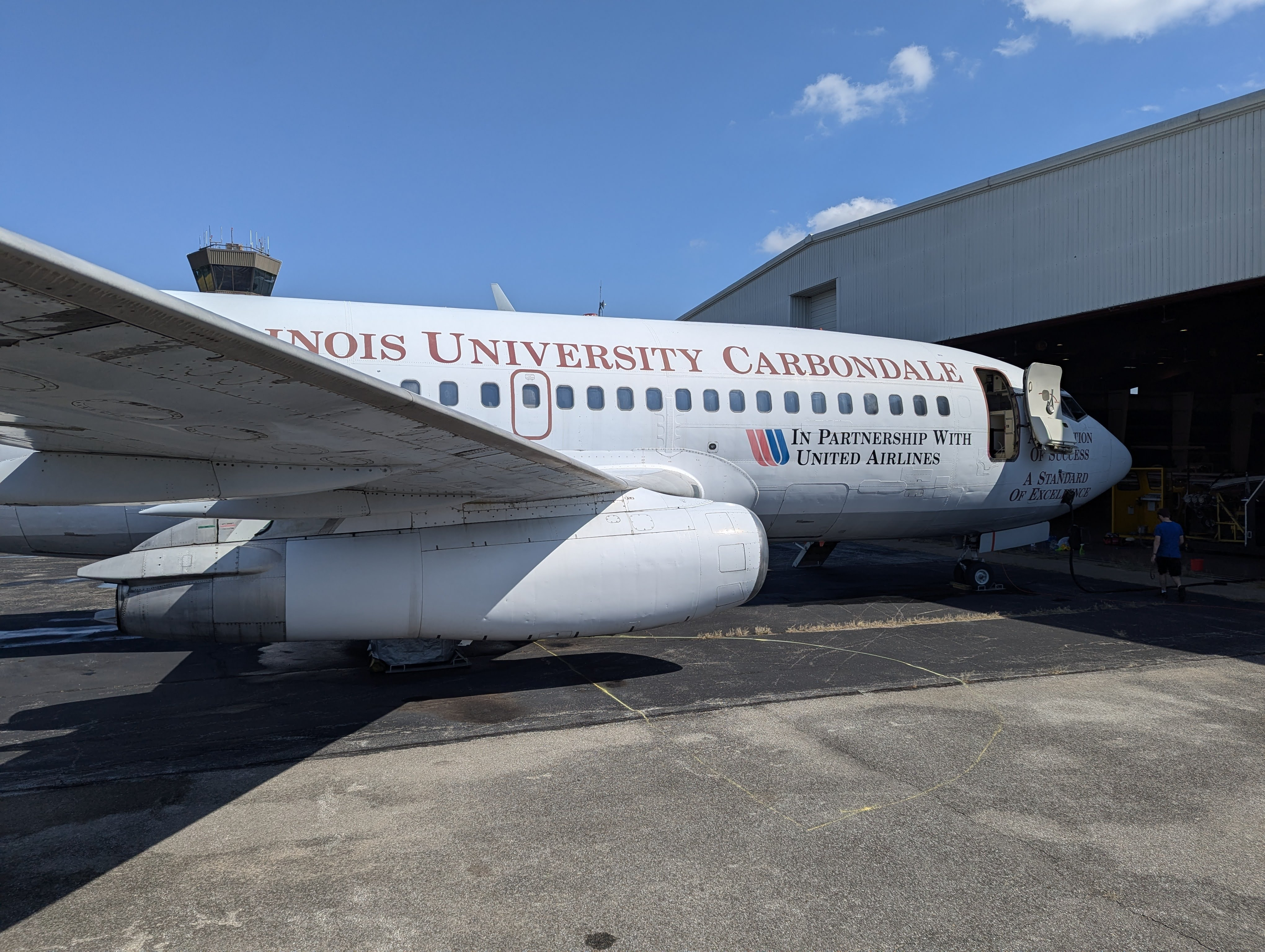
SIU's ex-United 737-200 pictured in front of the Aviation Technologies Hangar

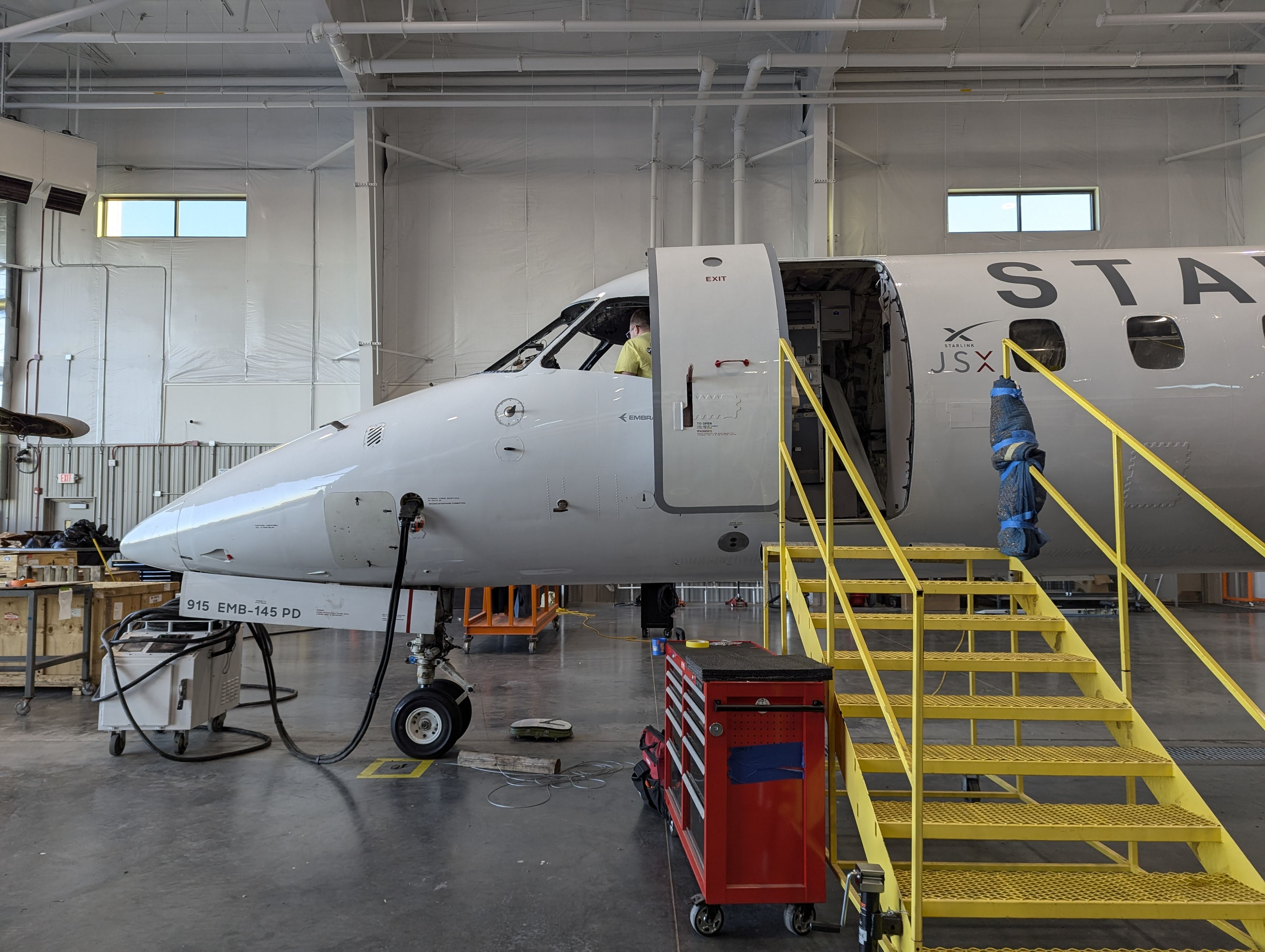
JSX ERJ-145 undergoing maintenance at Crucial MRO

== See also ==
- Carbondale station
- List of airports in Illinois
