= Rides Mass Transit District =

Provider of mass transportation in Southern Illinois

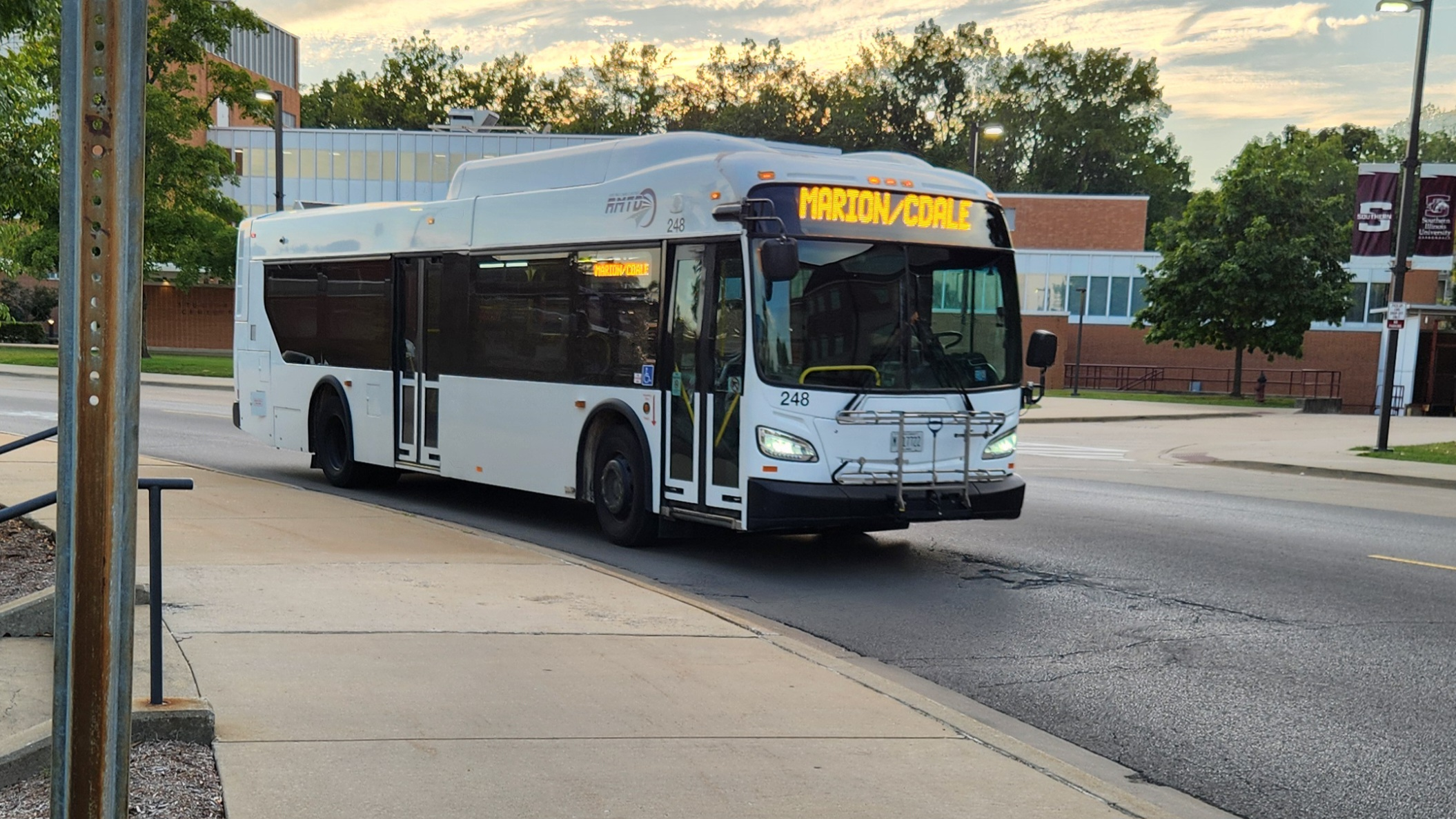
- A RMTD bus used for the Marion-Carbondale Route in October 2025
- Founded: 1977
- Headquarters: 1304 Frank Leberman Drive, Harrisburg, IL 62946
- Locale: Carbondale, Harrisburg, and Marion, Illinois
- Service area: Southeast Illinois; Clark, Crawford, Cumberland, Edgar, Edwards, Gallatin, Hamilton, Hardin, Jasper, Lawrence, Pope, Richland, Saline, Wabash, Wayne, White, and Williamson counties
- Service type: Bus service, paratransit
- Routes: 12
- Stations: Bill Jung Transfer Center
- Fleet: 137 buses
- Annual ridership: 1,119,285 (2019)
- Website: Rides Mass Transit District

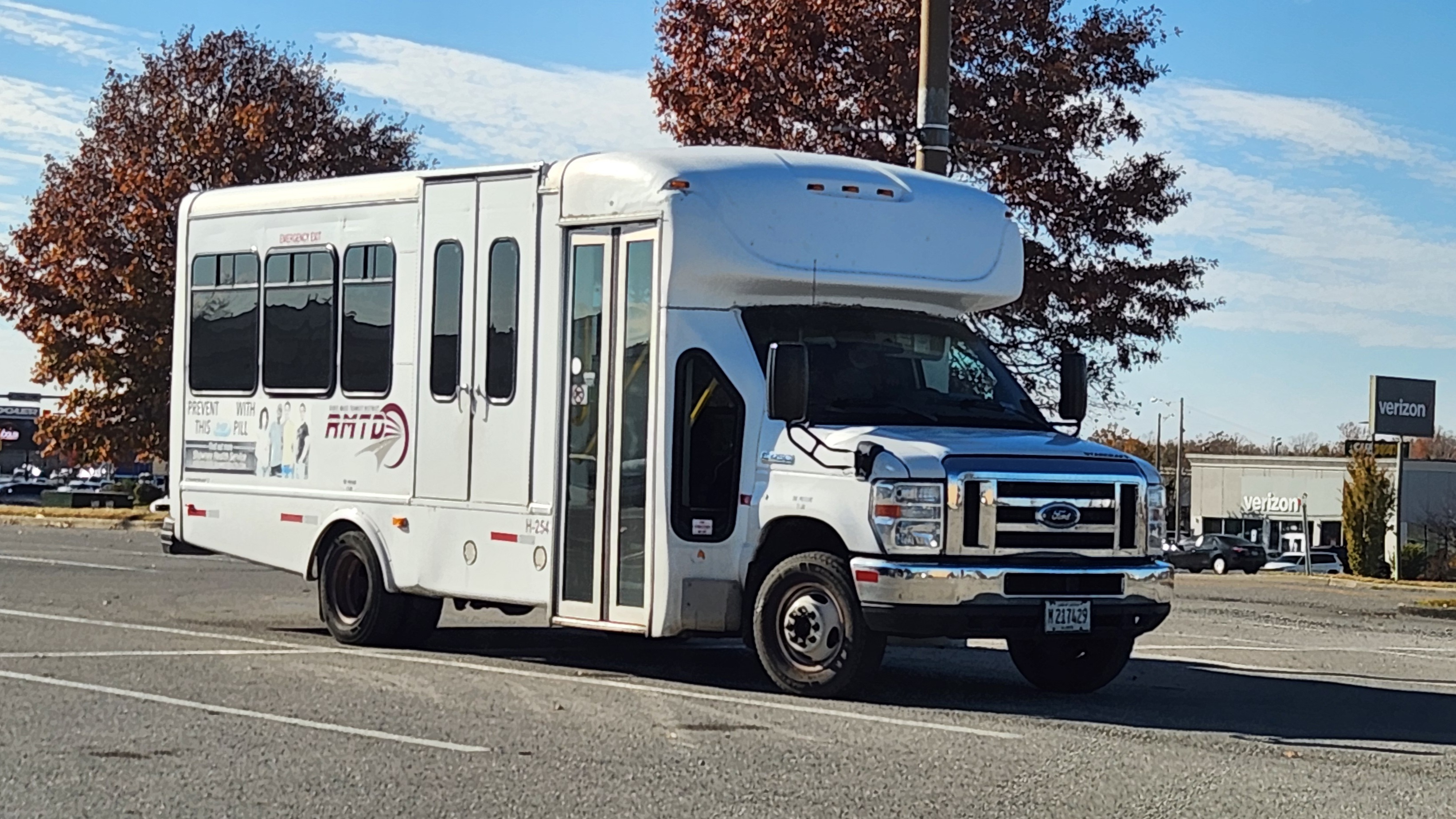
A RMTD bus seen in November 2025

Rides Mass Transit District (RMTD) is a provider of mass transportation in Southern Illinois, primarily serving Harrisburg, Marion, Robinson, Paris, Mount Carmel, and Olney. Local fixed-route transit service is provided in these communities, while additional demand-response service is available through the 17 county service area. The counties served include Clark, Crawford, Cumberland, Edgar, Edwards, Gallatin, Hamilton, Hardin, Jasper, Lawrence, Pope, Richland, Saline, Wabash, Wayne, White, and Williamson counties. As of 2019, the system provided 1,119,285 rides over 249,718 annual vehicle revenue hours with 137 buses. In FY 2024, the system provided 636,290 rides over 141,218 annual vehicle revenue hours. In FY 2025, the system provided 367,682 rides over 142,368 revenue hours and 2,499,892 miles. In FY 2026, the system saw 375,912 trips and drove 2,476,246 miles and 147,017 service hours.

== History ==
In the early 1900s, public transit in Carbondale, Harrisburg and Marion was provided by streetcars. However, by 1933 these streetcar systems had all been replaced by buses. The beginning of the RMTD was in 1977, when the Rural Initiative Development of Effective Services (RIDES) began in Pope and Hardin counties, initially providing rides to nutrition centers. This service slowly expanded to three nearby counties, and in 1990, RMTD was officially formed as a Mass Transit District. Since that time, 12 more counties have joined RMTD.

Major changes came to the system came in the late 2010s, when in 2018 RMTD took over operations of Saluki Express in Carbondale on June 11. This brought significantly more routes under the RMTD system, and allows SIU students greater access to RMTD services.

Eighteen days later the RMTD broke ground on a new transit center near the VA Medical Center in Marion. The $1.8 million facility includes a park & ride, a six bay covered bus loading area, indoor waiting area and real-time information displays. The facility opened on October 7, 2019, allowing access to RMTD services, South Central Transit and Greyhound Lines.

On March 1, 2023, the Wildcat Service began offering fixed-route transit within Marion. The new 10 stop route is intended to solve inadequate transportation, which is a major barrier to employment in the area. A partnership between RMTD and the city of Marion, five bus shelters were built alongside the service improvement, leading to an immediate increase in patronage of the RMTD buses.

In 2024, RMTD transferred Saluki Express services to Jackson County Mass Transit District due to funding cuts to both RMTD and JCMTD.

== Service ==
Rides Mass Transit District operates fixed-route services in Harrisburg, Marion, Mount Carmel, Olney, Robinson, and Paris. Additionally, fixed-route service is provided between Carbondale and Marion, while local and intercity demand-response service is operated through the Southeastern Illinois service area. Regular fares for all the fixed-route services are $1.00.

Within Marion, the Wildcat Route provides service at 60 minute headways on weekdays from 6:00 A.M. to 5:47 P.M. Monday-Friday. The Marion Crosstown route provides service at 90 minute headways Monday-Friday. Within Harrisburg, the Bulldog Route provides service at 60 minute headways on weekdays from 10:00 a.m. - 4:00 p.m. The Marion-Carbondale Route operates with departures every two and a half hours on weekdays. Fixed Route service in Robinson, Illinois was established in August 2024 and now operates with 60 minute headways operating Monday-Friday from 10 a.m. - 5 p.m. Fixed Route service in Olney, Illinois was established in September 2024 and now operates with 60 minute headways operating Monday-Friday from 10 a.m. - 4 p.m. The Paris Tiger fixed route was established in August 2025 and now operates with 60-minute headways operating weekdays from 10 a.m. - 4 p.m. The Golden Aces Route in Mt. Carmel was established in August 2025 with 60-minute headways now operating weekdays from 10 a.m. - 4 p.m. The Marion East Route was established in August 2025 with 60-minute headways operating weekdays from 6:30 a.m. - 5:12 p.m. It ceased operation Oct. 30, 2026 as the stops were combined on the Marion Crosstown route.

At the Bill Jung Transfer Center and Park-and-Ride in Marion, Illinois, the Wildcat Route, Marion Crosstown, Marion East, and Marion-Carbondale route provide connections to South Central Transit. Fixed route passengers can download the Rides MTD Go mobile app to track bus location real-time, while door-to-door reservations can be requested in advance by using the Book It by Rides MTD mobile application.

=== Routes ===
- Bulldog Route (Harrisburg)
- Wildcat Route (Marion)
- Marion Crosstown (Marion)
- Marion-Carbondale Route
- Maroon Route (Robinson)
- White Squirrel Route (Olney)
- Aces Route (Mt. Carmel)
- Tiger Route (Paris)

== Bill Jung Transfer Center ==
The Bill Jung Transfer Center is located at 2315 West Main Street in Marion. Opened on October 7, 2019, the facility features six bus bays and an indoor waiting area for passengers. It is served by the Wildcat Route, Marion Crosstown, and Marion-Carbondale Route of RMTD, as well as the Olive Route of South Central Transit. It was named to honor the 25 year CEO of RMTD.

== See also ==
- List of bus transit systems in the United States
- List of intercity bus stops in Illinois
- Carbondale station
- JAX Mass Transit
- South Central Transit
