= Gramlich =

Gramlich is a German surname. Notable people with the surname include:

- Arthur Benedict Gramlich (1904–1974), German-American miner and activist
- Charles Gramlich (born 1958), American writer
- Edward Gramlich (1939–2007), American economist and academic
- Hermann Gramlich (1913–1942), German footballer
- Jeffrey Gramlich, American academic
- Lori Gramlich, American politician
- Rudolf Gramlich (1908–1988), German footballer and chairman
- Zachary Gramlich, American politician
