= Kathleen Coal Mine =

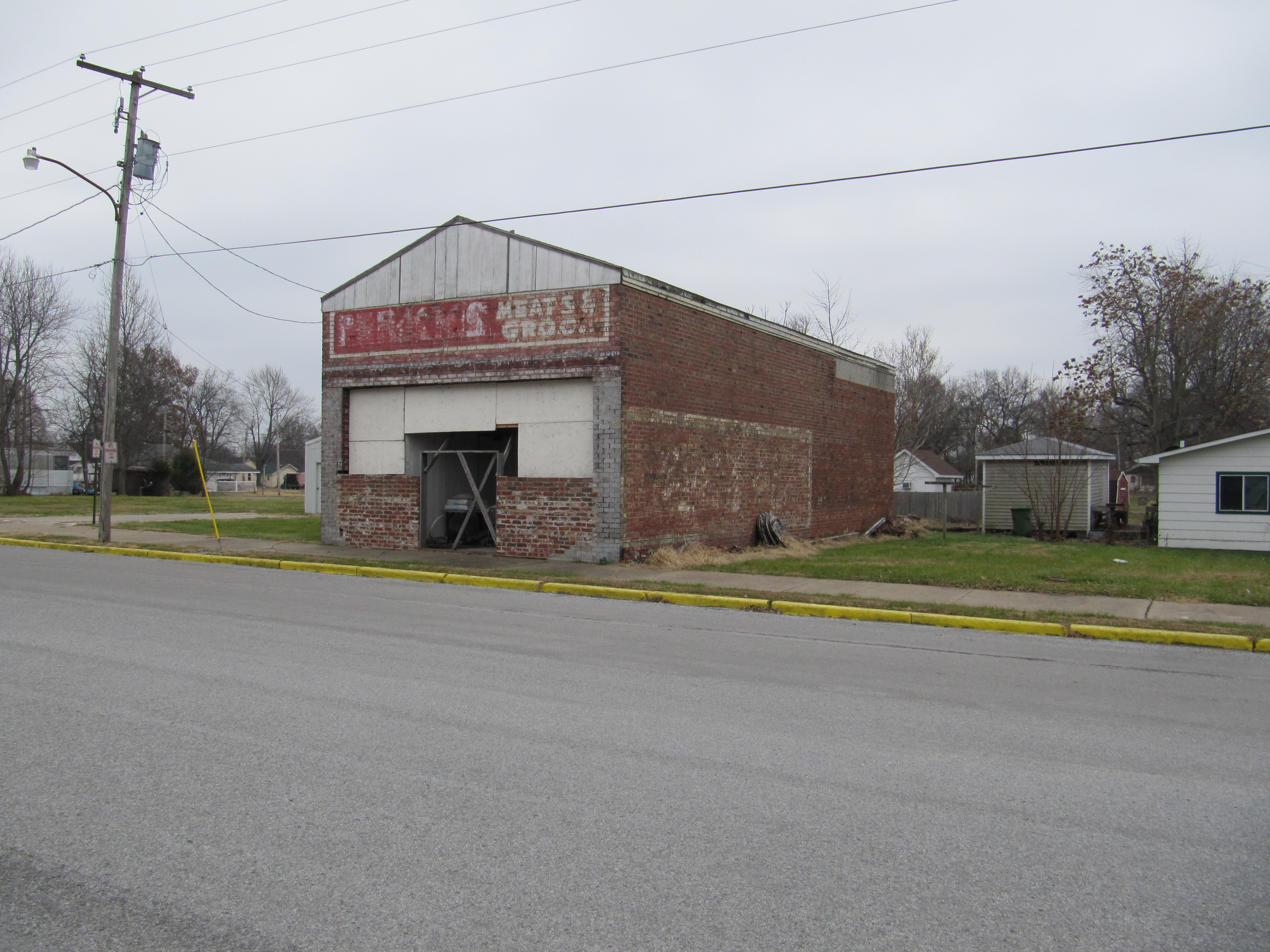
- Former Kathleen Coal Mine Company Store in Dowell, IL

- Location within Illinois
- Location: Illinois, United States; 37°56′25″N 89°13′42″W
- Products: Coal
- Greatest depth: 261
- Opened: 1918
- Closed: 1946
- Company: Union Colliery Company

The Kathleen Mine was a coal mine that operated in the nearby coal town of Dowell, Illinois, United States, from 1918 to 1946. At peak production, its output was 5,000 tons/day of coal. It was operated by the Union Colliery Company in St. Louis. Many miners who worked in the Kathleen were immigrants from eastern Europe, including Rusyns.

== Location ==
The former mine site lies on the east side of U.S. Route 51, directly opposite the village of Dowell. A spur rail line formerly connected the mine site with the Illinois Central Railroad, which passes through Dowell today.

== History ==
The Kathleen was sunk in 1917 and the mine opened in 1918. It was named for Kathleen McAuliffe who was the daughter of Eugene McAuliffe, the president of the colliery company.

Duquoin -- What is said to be the largest mine tipple in the world is being constructed over the main shaft of the new mine of the Union Colliery Co.. of St. Louis, at the new town of Dowel], five miles south of here. Coal is already being mined and sent to St. Louis for the use of the Union Electric Light and Power Co., of which the Union Colliery Co. is a subsidiary company

— Staff writer(s), "Coal Age", Coal Age (September 26, 1918)

The Union Colliery Company of St. Louis is constructing a large and modern mine in Jackson County, on the Illinois Central Railroad, five miles south of Duquoin. Both shafts have been sunk to the coal, which is No. 6 seam with average thickness of 8 feet 3 inches, main shaft 260 feet to bottom of seam. The air shaft tipple built of reinforced concrete has been completed. A Wellman Seaver Moran electric hoist has been installed and equipped with a 250 horsepower a. c. motor, a rotary dump in the tipple, screen and mine run chute, so mine run, lump and screening coal can be loaded from this shaft. The shaft is 26 feet 4 inches by 12 feet 6 inches over all and is absolutely fireproof throughout. The lining is of reinforced concrete with steel buntons. The air chamber is 8 feet by 12 feet 6 inches inside and is separated from the stairway and hoisting compartment by a 10-inch reinforced concrete wall. A 12 foot by 5 foot high speed reversible Jeffery fan is being installed, having a 200 horsepower motor drive and steam engine for an auxiliary drive. The fan house will be of brick and reinforced concrete. The machine and blacksmith shop, store room and office building is fire proof throughout; the office is on the second floor above the store room and has every convenience. A 4-track steel tipple of the Allen & Garcia type is under construction and will be equipped with shaker screen, picking tables and loading booms. A storage track for 110 loaded cars has been provided for; there will also be room for that many empty cars above the tipple. A narrow gauge track has been laid between the two standard gauge tracks, extending from the end of the empty track through the tipple to the end of the load storage track. A 20-ton steam locomotive is used for handling the cars to and from the tipple. The main shaft will also be fireproof throughout with reinforced concrete lining and steel buntons. This promises to be one of the most substantial and modern coal mines in Southern Illinois.

— Staff writer(s), "Annual Coal Report", Department of Mines and Minerals, Annual Coal Report (Springfield, IL: State of Illinois), (1918)

Upon opening, it was the largest bituminous mine in the world at the time. The tipple was designed by Allen and Garcia Company, an engineering firm based in Chicago. The builders of the concrete tipple at the Kathleen Mine (and the other associated buildings at the site) are unknown.

In February, 1920 the Union Colliery Company employed over 300 men with an average monthly payroll of over $35,000.

The mine workers were members of the United Mine Workers union led by John Lewis. Its miners went on strike from 1933 to 1937. They struck for the right to join the Progressive Mining Union. The period was marked with occasional violence related to the unionization movement.

The Kathleen Mine closed on November 21, 1946. Over its life, over 150 men were killed working there.

=== New Kathleen Mine ===
A new mine operated by Union Colliery was opened north of Dowell in January 1946. It was named the New Kathleen. This mine closed in 1947. Land scars are still visible from this mine.

== Disasters ==
- In February 1921 seven men were trapped and killed in the mine when a fire forced rescuers to seal the mine to contain the fire
- Nine men were killed by carbon monoxide poisoning on August 1, 1936. This was the worst accident in the mine's history. Many of the deaths occurred during rescue operations

== The Kathleen Mine Today ==
The entrance to the mine has been closed. On the site as of December, 2021 is Cobin's Salvage Yard. Although the tipple remains at its original location, the setting has been dramatically altered by the complete destruction of all the other mine-related buildings on the site. These buildings were partially scrapped in the years following the mine's abandonment in 1947, and the surviving building remnants were destroyed as part a mine reclamation carried out in 1999. The terrain around the mine site also was altered to some extent by the mine reclamation, in respect to the moving of gob and the construction of a water detention pond on site. Additionally, all of the machinery and much of the steel structure once present on the tipple have been removed and/or salvaged.

The mine has been suspected of causing sinkholes in the nearby village of Dowell.

== Gallery ==
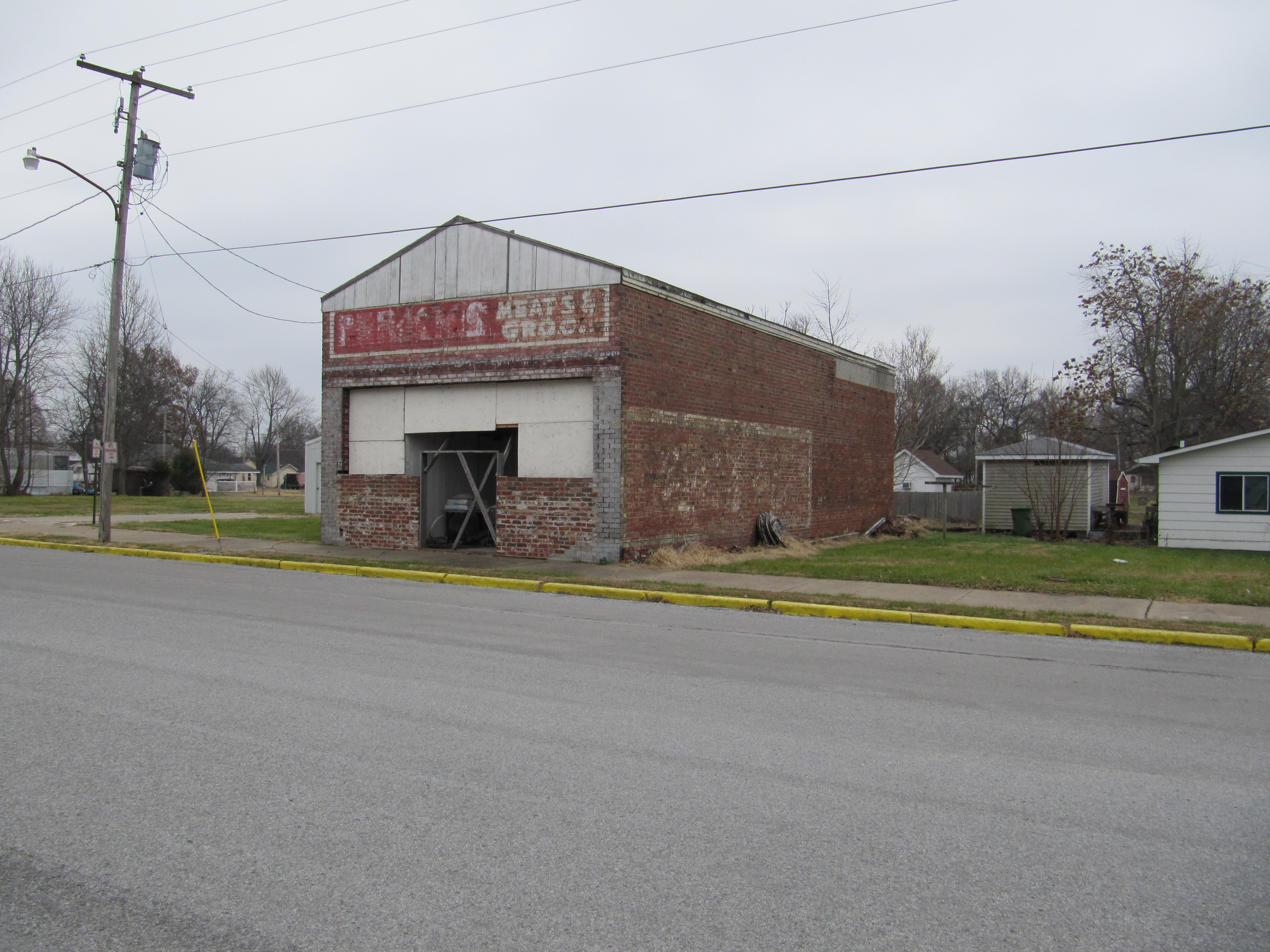
Former company store in Dowell

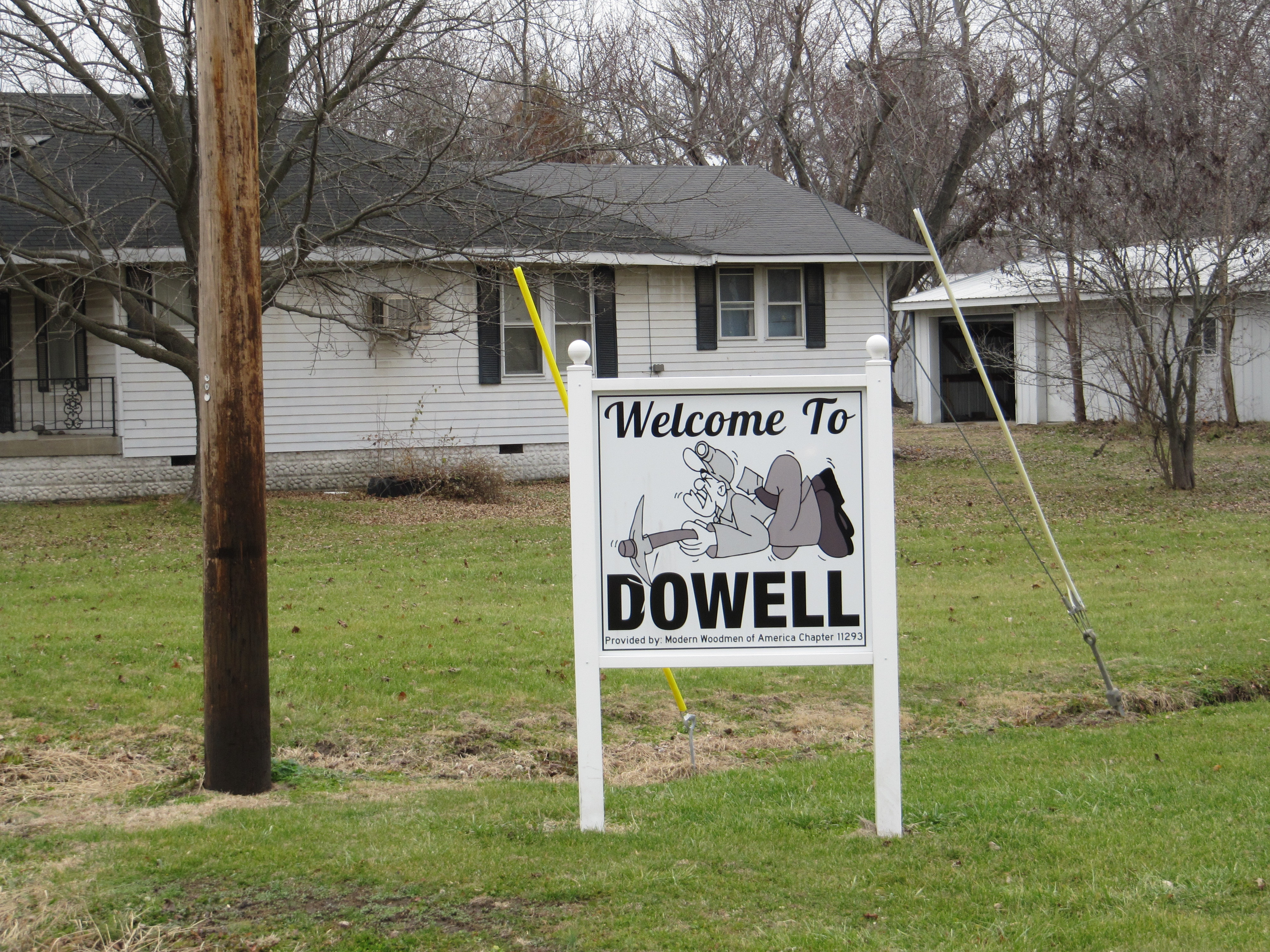
Entering Dowell

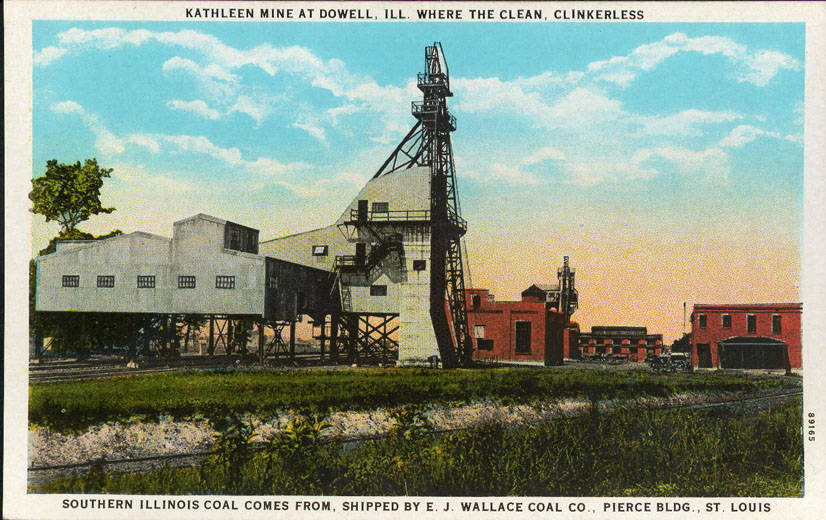
Kathleen Mine at Dowell, Ill. Where the Clean, Clinkerless Southern Illinois Coal Comes From,... (NBY 428839)
