= Dowell, Illinois =

- Village
- Location of Dowell in Jackson County, Illinois
- Coordinates: 37°56′23″N 89°14′21″W
- Country: United States
- State: Illinois
- County: Jackson
- Township: Elk
- Founded: 1915
- Founder: George Dowell

Area
  - Total: 0.39 sq mi (1.01 km^{2})
  - Land: 0.39 sq mi (1.01 km^{2})
  - Water: 0 sq mi (0.00 km^{2})
- Elevation: 400 ft (120 m)

Population (2020)
  - Total: 368
  - Density: 943.4/sq mi (364.23/km^{2})
- Time zone: UTC-6 (CST)
  - Summer (DST): UTC-5 (CDT)
- ZIP code: 62927
- Area code: 618
- GNIS ID: 2398744
- FIPS code: 17-20565

Dowell is a village in Jackson County, Illinois, United States. The population was 368 at the 2020 census, down from 408 at the 2010 census.

== History ==
Dowell was founded as a coal town and named by Du Quoin attorney George Dowell and William Lafont. They requested bids for property development as early as 1917. In 1922, the town's population was over 2,000.

In February 1920, the Dowell State Bank was opened in the town. Town founders George Dowell and William Lafont were among the first directors of the bank. It was the scene of a bank robbery on September 30, 1924. The bank closed in 1932 following embezzlement charges against its president, William Lafont.

In late 1920, construction began on a railroad depot serving the Illinois Central Railroad. At one time the rail line had a spur into the Kathleen Coal Mine

Coal mining brought many eastern European immigrants to the village, including Rusyns. At one time there was a Russian Orthodox church located east of the railroad tracks on Vogel Avenue. This church was closed prior to 1989., The area is still served by the Holy Protection Church church in nearby Royalton. In the 1930 census, 30% of the respondents indicated they descended from Eastern Europe and/or spoke a Slavic language.

The village was host to violence in the 1920s and 1930s, including robberies and murders. Bootlegging was common in the village during Prohibition. Bootlegger Charlie Birger and the Shelton Brothers Gang operated in and around Dowell.

=== Kathleen Coal Mine ===
The town has supported miners from local coal mines. The Kathleen Coal Mine was located northeast of the village. It was opened and operated by the Union Colliery Company. It was the scene of a disaster in 1921 and again in 1936. In early 1937, it was the largest producing mine in Jackson county, producing over 5,000 tons of coal per day and employing over 500 men.

The mine workers were members of the United Mine Workers union led by John Lewis. Its miners went on strike from 1933 to 1937. They struck for the right to join the Progressive Mining Union. The period was marked with occasional violence related to the unionization movement.

The mine was closed in November 1946 after the coal vein was no longer accessible. On the site as of December 2021 is Cobin's Salvage Yard. There are few remaining signs of the mine that once built the village of Dowell. A small concrete structure, the mine tipple, is the only structure that remains from the mine.

A second mine, known as the "New Kathleen", was opened in January 1946. This second mine closed by 1958., Land scars are still visible from this mine.

At one time, oil companies conducted research to determine if oil could be extracted from the coal seams around the Kathleen.

=== Baseball team ===
The town hosted a baseball team that consisted of players who worked in the Kathleen Mine. The team was named the Dowell Kathleens. They occasionally played against the St. Louis Browns, a professional team, as well as the Belleville Stags, a minor league team.

=== Dowell today ===
With the departure of the Kathleen Mine, Dowell has become a quiet residential community. The mine has been suspected of causing sinkholes in the village.

== Demographics ==
Historical population
| Census | Pop. | Note | %± |
|---|---|---|---|
| 1920 | 422 | | — |
| 1930 | 832 | | 97.2% |
| 1940 | 704 | | −15.4% |
| 1950 | 616 | | −12.5% |
| 1960 | 453 | | −26.5% |
| 1970 | 423 | | −6.6% |
| 1980 | 480 | | 13.5% |
| 1990 | 465 | | −3.1% |
| 2000 | 441 | | −5.2% |
| 2010 | 408 | | −7.5% |
| 2020 | 368 | | −9.8% |
U.S. Decennial Census

As of the 2020 census there were 368 people, 158 households, and 93 families residing in the village. The population density was 941.18 inhabitants per square mile (363.39/km^{2}). There were 191 housing units at an average density of 488.49 per square mile (188.61/km^{2}). The racial makeup of the village was 89.40% White, 2.17% African American, 0.82% Native American, 0.27% Asian, 0.00% Pacific Islander, 0.82% from other races, and 6.52% from two or more races. Hispanic or Latino of any race were 1.63% of the population.

There were 158 households, out of which 12.7% had children under the age of 18 living with them, 45.57% were married couples living together, 6.96% had a female householder with no husband present, and 41.14% were non-families. 25.32% of all households were made up of individuals, and 11.39% had someone living alone who was 65 years of age or older. The average household size was 2.69 and the average family size was 2.25.

The village's age distribution consisted of 13.8% under the age of 18, 16.3% from 18 to 24, 27.3% from 25 to 44, 24.4% from 45 to 64, and 18.3% who were 65 years of age or older. The median age was 39.1 years. For every 100 females, there were 104.6 males. For every 100 females age 18 and over, there were 108.8 males.

The median income for a household in the village was $36,111, and the median income for a family was $36,250. Males had a median income of $25,833 versus $21,250 for females. The per capita income for the village was $19,340. About 20.4% of families and 25.3% of the population were below the poverty line, including 63.3% of those under age 18 and 9.2% of those age 65 or over.

== Geography ==
Dowell is located in northeastern Jackson County. U.S. Route 51 passes through the eastern side of the village, leading south 9 miles (14 km) to De Soto and north 5 miles (8 km) to Du Quoin.

According to the 2021 census gazetteer files, Dowell has a total area of 0.39 square miles (1.01 km^{2}), of which 0.39 square miles (1.01 km^{2}) (or 99.74%) is land and 0.00 square miles (0.00 km^{2}) (or 0.26%) is water.

== Education ==
It is in the Elverado Community Unit School District 196.

== Notable person ==
- Rudolph Wanderone Jr. (a.k.a. Minnesota Fats), noted billiards player,

== Gallery ==
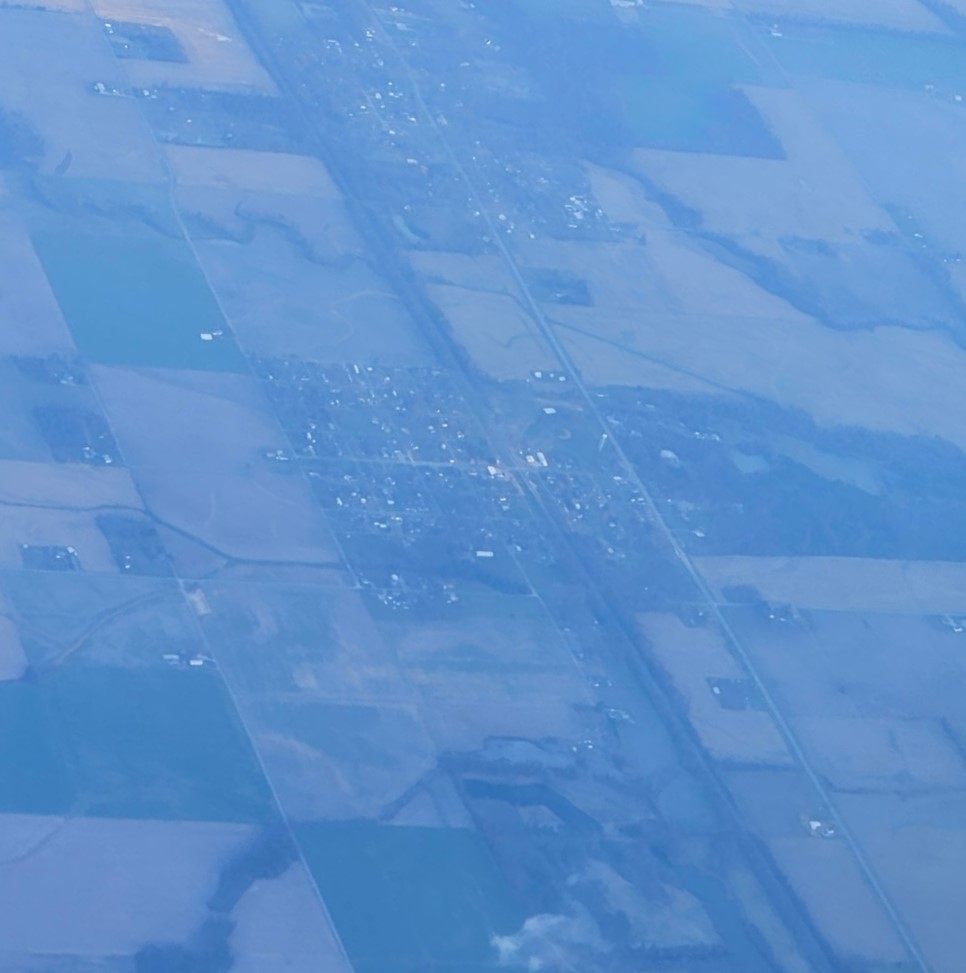
Dowell Iliinois

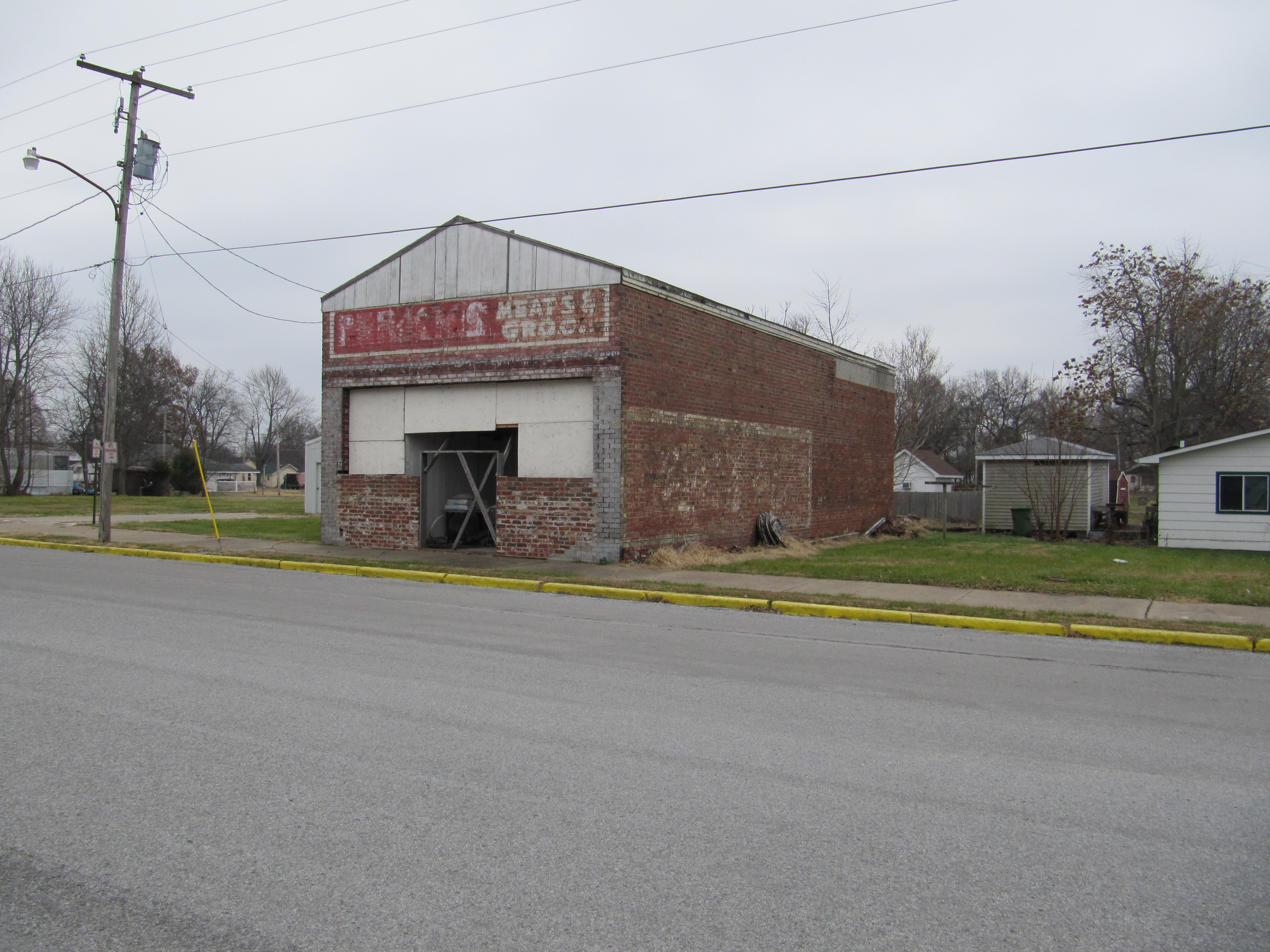
Former company store in Dowell

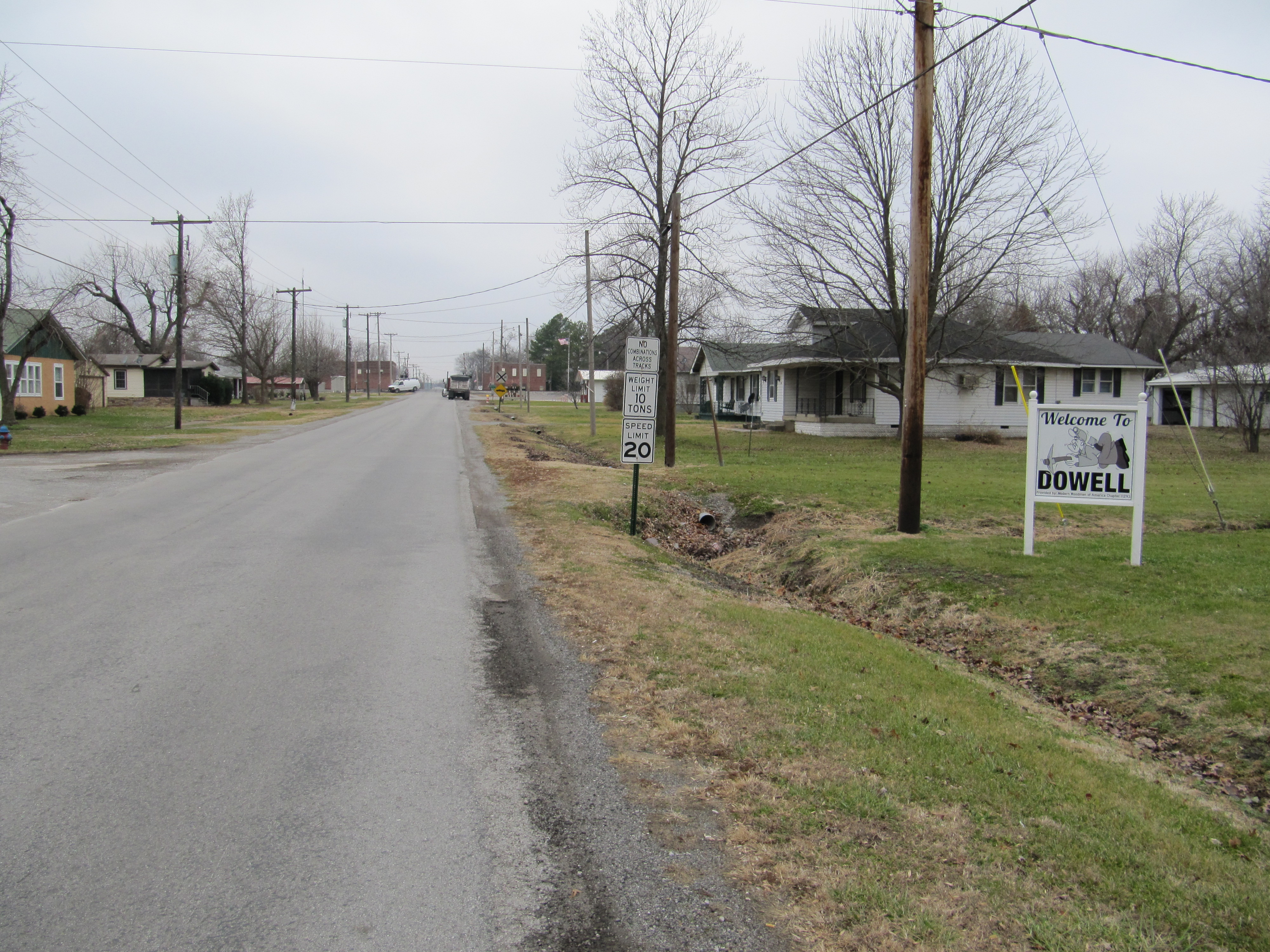
Entering Dowell

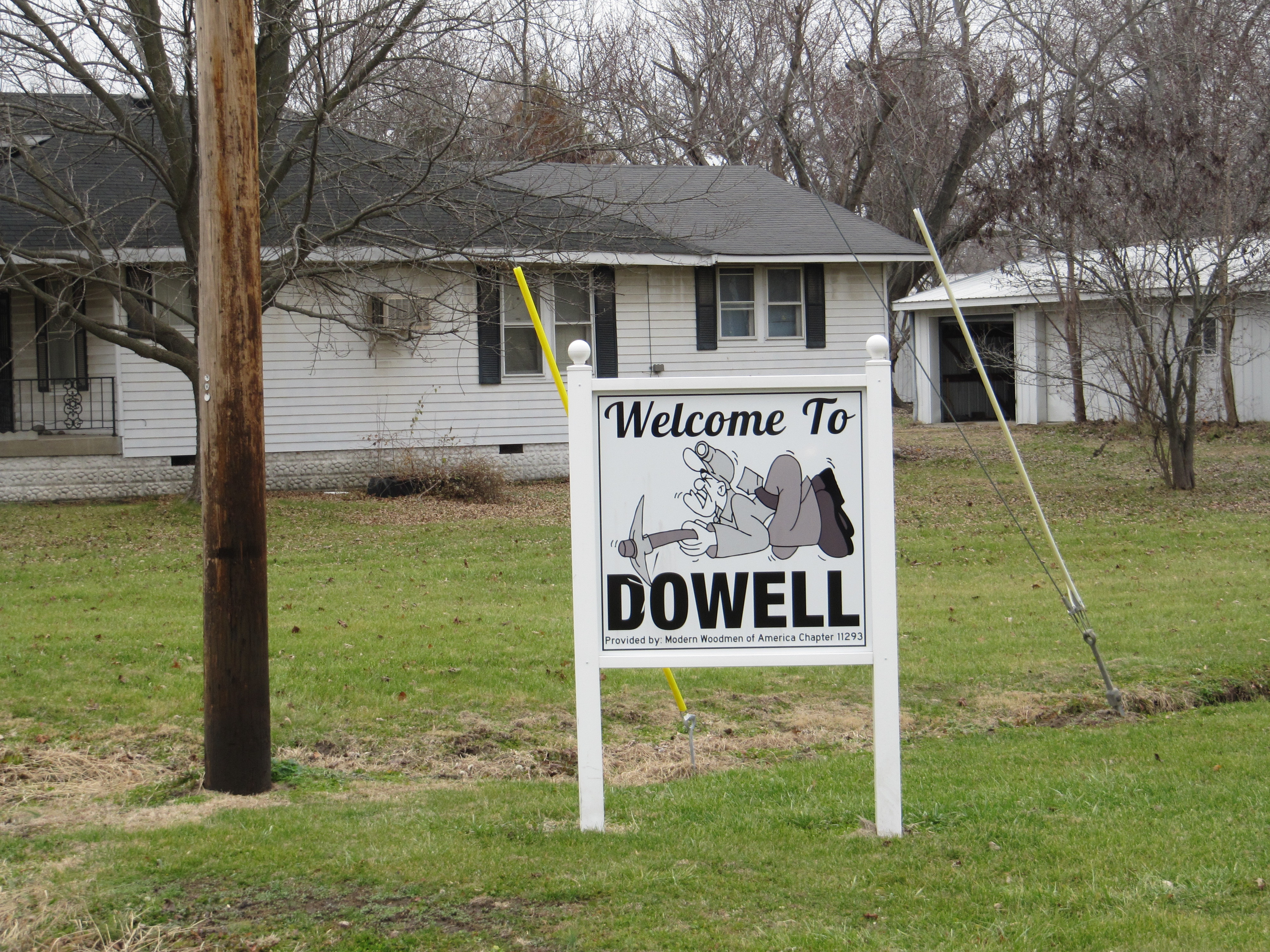
Entering Dowell

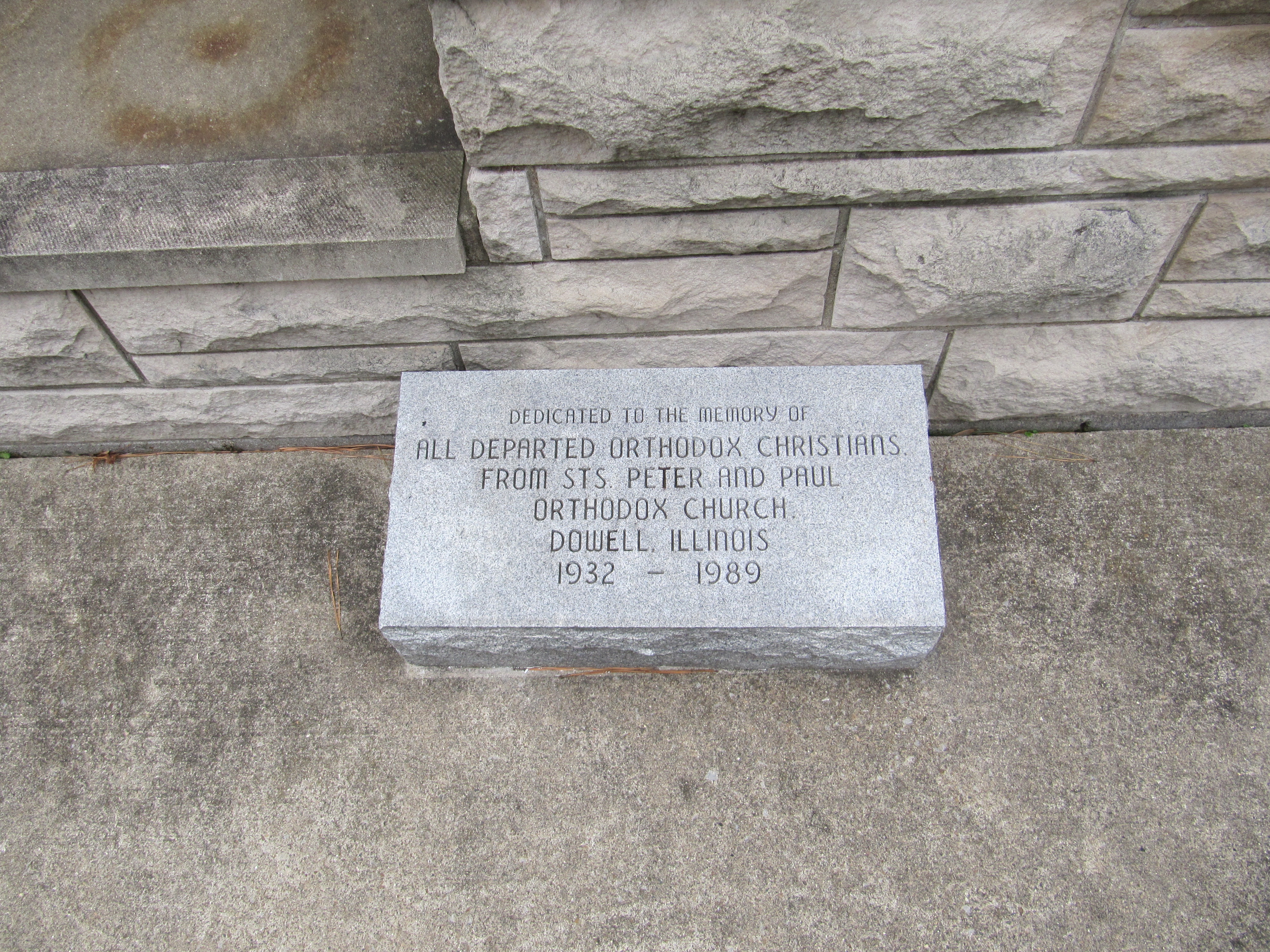
Memorial to the former Dowell Russian Orthodox Church, located at the Holy Protection Russian Orthodox church in Royalton

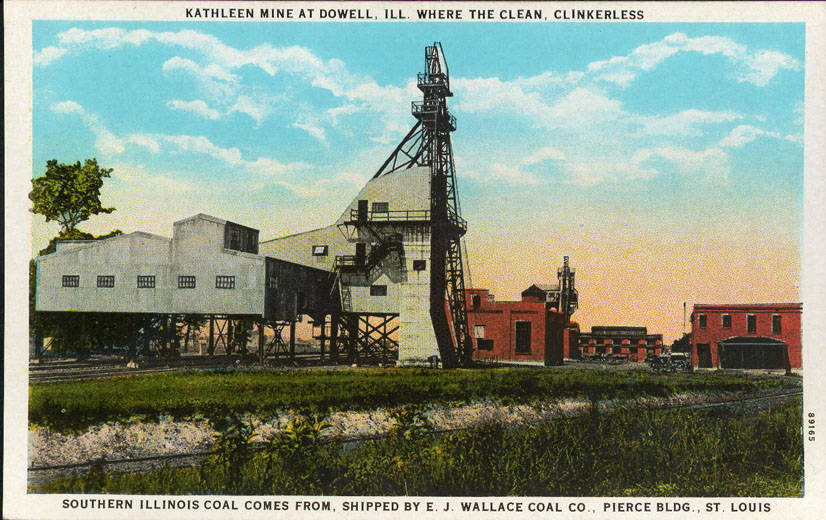
Kathleen Mine at Dowell, Ill. Source of the clean, clinkerless Southern Illinois coal
