= Bloodstorm =

Bloodstorm can refer to:

- BloodStorm, an arcade game
- Bloodstorm (book), a novel by Heather Gladney
- Bloodstorm (Marvel Comics), an alternate version of X-Men character Storm
- Bloodstorm One, a vampire character in Marvel Comics
- Batman: Bloodstorm, a DC Comics graphic novel
- Subspecies 4: Bloodstorm, a horror film
- Bloodstorm, the UK DVD title for Nazis at the Center of the Earth
