= The Ladies Auxiliary of the International Union of Mine Mill and Smelter Workers =

Former trade union of the United States

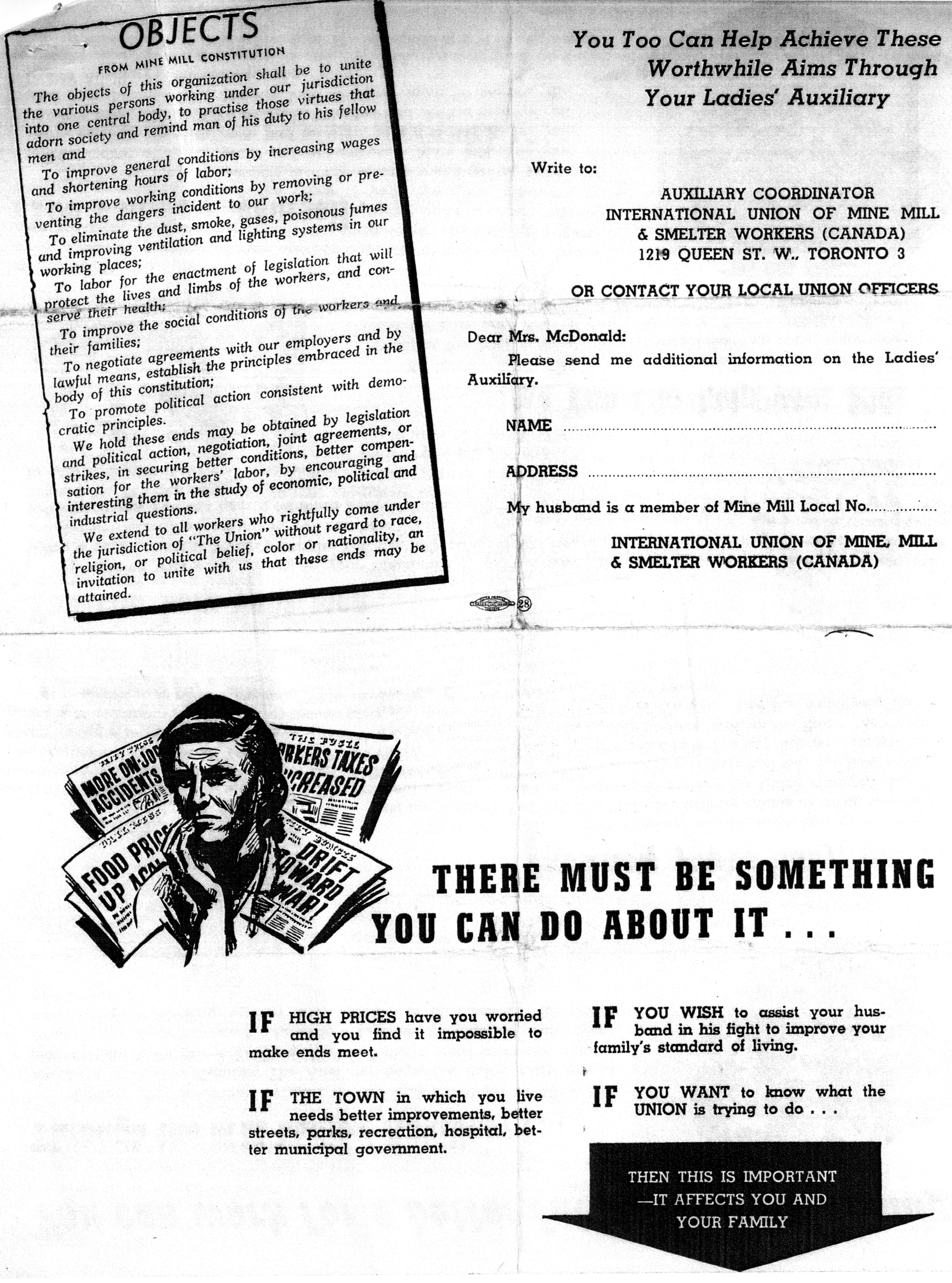
Recruiting material for the IUMMSW LA

The Ladies' Auxiliaries (LA) of the International Union Mine Mill and Smelter Workers (IUMMSW) were women's organizations in the United States of America and Canada associated with local units of the IUMMSW. Women active in the Auxiliaries were the wives, daughters, sisters, and mothers of IUMMSW members. Women's organizations associated with trade unions in male-dominated industries have played a central role in labour struggles since the end of the 19th century.

The Ladies Auxiliaries of the IUMMSW helped to sustain and build the strength of the union. During labour strikes, these women fed thousands of striking miners on the picket lines and organized clothing drives for strikers' needy families. They initiated letter-writing campaigns to improve worker safety, participating in labour organizing, and collectivized around various social issues such as child care, racism, and health care. These activities were unpaid. The work of these women contributed to the development of IUMMSW as a viable and powerful force in labour movement of the early 20th century.

Others Ladies Auxiliary groups in the early 20th century included those associated with: the Brotherhood of Locomotive Firemen and Engineers, the Brotherhood of Sleeping Car Porters’, Carpenters, Milk Drivers, Mail Carriers, and Motion Picture Operators and the International Association of Machinists (this Auxiliary had a membership of over 20K in 1920).

== International Union of Mine Mill and Smelter Workers (IUMMSW) ==
Along with other left-led unions, IUMMSW upheld the post-war vision of progress through labour unity and its active pursuit of broader social goals. It was successful in securing gains for its members at the bargaining table and animating its internal culture with their belief in the fairness and justice of an egalitarian society. Although an international union, IUMMSW had several very large Canadian locals in the 1950s in Ontario, British Columbia(BC), and Quebec. In the Sudbury local alone, IUMMSW organized close to 18,000 in the mines and smelters of International Nickel Company and Falconbridge. During the Cold War period, unions with left-leaning leaderships, such as IUMMMSW were isolated, raided, and ultimately defeated one by one, their leaders branded as subversives and enemy agents. The Royal Canadian Mounted Police (RCMP) infiltrated many of these unions and kept detailed surveillance files on their leading activists. Only in the early 1990s, 40 years after their covert surveillance, did the RCMP admit publicly to these activities, including their reliance on informants in the IUMMSW's Ladies Auxiliary.

The union's imperative was to contribute to the emancipation of the working-class, nominally men and women alike, although like many trade unions of the time, the membership of IUMMSW was exclusively male. Indeed, legislation in Ontario restricted women from all forms of mine employment other than clerical work well past mid-century. The physical demands and inherent dangers of mine work were linked inextricably with masculinity. To be a miner, a millworker, or a smelterman was to be a man. Apart from their involvement as waged smelter workers during the war years, eclipsed in the aftermath of war when men returned to reclaim their positions, women contributed to the struggle for better working conditions in the mines and smelters via the Ladies’ Auxiliary. Inspired not by wages, but by their dreams of a fair and just world, these women prepared meals during strikes, organized clothing drives for picketers, and augmented the finances of the male locals with the proceeds of their bake sales, while working to address large-scale social and economic problems such as “Teenage Problems”, “Health”, “Racial Problems” and “World Peace” (see One LA Local's Program for Coming Year insert).

== IUMMSW Ladies Auxiliary’s Political Work ==
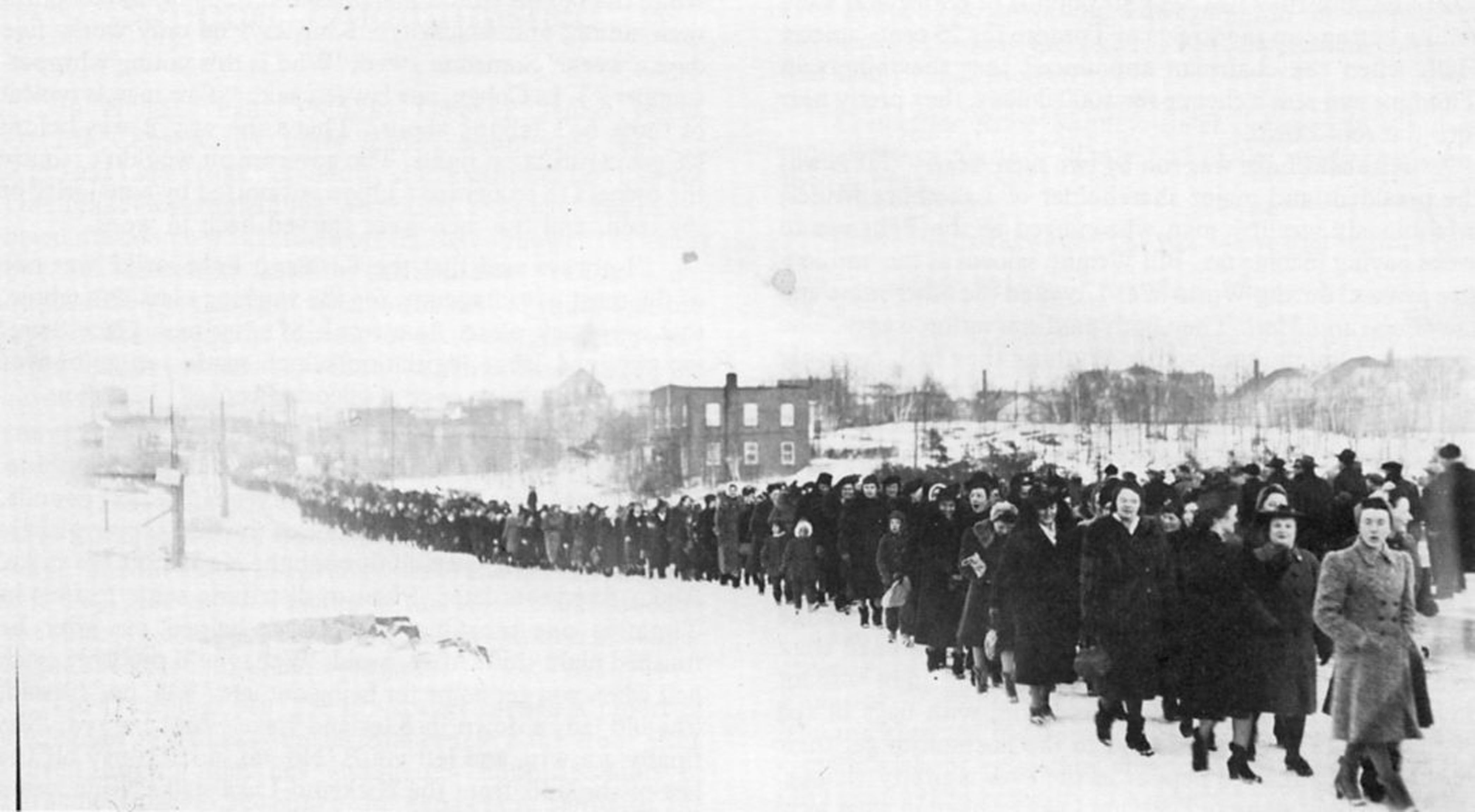
2 mile long picket of women and children in the 1941 Kirkland Lake strike

The image of the woman standing behind her man and his job became a sentimental theme in union literature. As Strom's archival research shows, the Congress Industrial Organization members thought "a good union girl’ should work to support her family, should use makeup moderately and keep her stocking seams straight, go out on the picket line with her man because having ‘girls come on the line…puts more pep in the gas’".

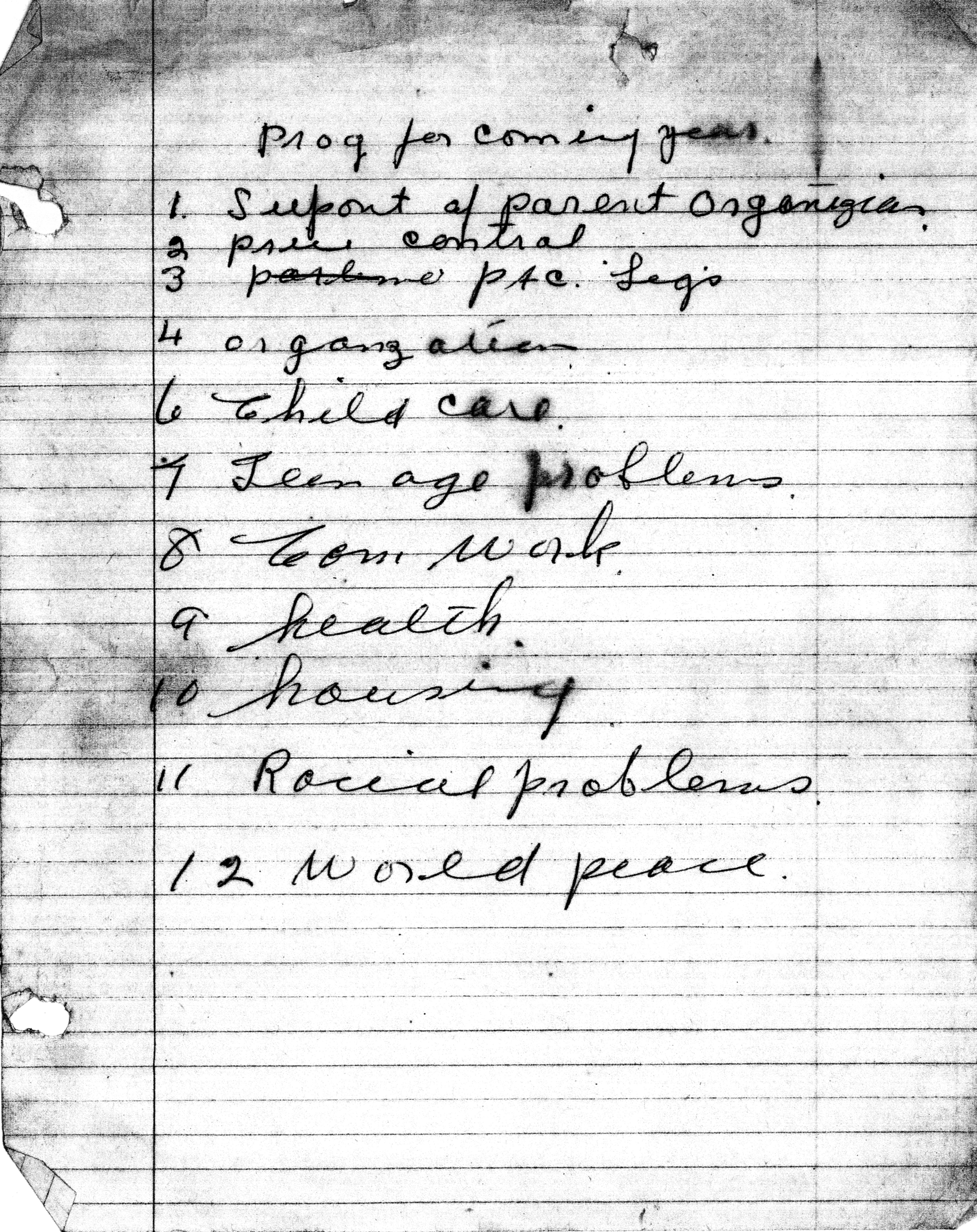
One of LA Local's Program for the Following Year

The historical records show, however, that LA did more than stand behind their male counterparts. While they took leading roles in strikes, such as the 1941 Kirkland Lake strike, they were not simply a ‘reserve army’ of the disappeared, resuming their posts in their kitchens after the strikes were over. Indeed, they had an active long-standing political agenda of their own including formal membership and involvements in women's organizations such as the Canadian Congress of Women.

The political work of LA has largely gone un-noticed even by Auxiliaries of subsequent generations. For example, during the 1983 Copper Strike in Morenci, Arizona, the Morenci Miners Women's Auxiliary fed and clothed families, which served to build solidarity and commitment among the strikers and their families, but also actively maintained the picket line and organized rallies to raise public awareness and support. The women spoke of the latter set of activities as ‘new’ political work of the auxiliary:

We don’t just do what the auxiliary used to do....

In 1944, one of the largest IUMMSW Auxiliary locals was established in Sudbury with a membership of approximately 300 members. Local 117 charter of the LA was granted at the same time the largest local (598) of IUMMSW was certified as the bargaining agent for approximately 10,000 (or ¾) employees of International Nickel Company and Falconbridge. Auxiliary locals existed where there were men's MMSW locals. By 1946, there were 25 Canadian LA: Yellowknife, Northwest Territories; Trail, Kimerberly, Bralorne, Copper Mountain and Britannia in BC; Kississing, Flin Flon in Manitoba; Geraldton, Timmins, Kirkland Lake, Sudbury, New Toronto, and Port Colborne in Ontario; Rouyn-Noranda, Val D’or, and Malartic in Quebec. The geographic spread within some locals warranted branches (e.g. Creighton-Lively branch, Levack branch and Garson branch of 117). When the LA locals became sufficiently large, with many branches, as the Sudbury 117 did in the early 1960s, the branches became distinct LA locals, albeit they were still affiliated with the structure of the men's local, e.g. The mines at Creighton-Lively and Levack, originally branches of LA local 117, become #316 and #317, respectively.

== IUMMSW Ladies Auxiliary’s Organizing Work ==
Many of the IUMMSW Auxiliaries were as long-lived as their male companion unions. Notably, the women took active roles in organizing not only the Auxiliaries but also the male locals. As one of the original Auxiliary members offers this compelling account of her organizing work:

You go ahead and you do it hey, but you are scared stiff. I was! I didn’t think anybody would want to kill us because we were trying to organize miners, it seemed incredible.

The material sacrifice of the work tumble out not far behind:

Those few months I lived on carrots that we happened to grow in the garden. And, if I ever see another soup bone it is going to be too many. From that day to this, I don’t boil a soup bone.

== See also ==
- Progressive Miners of America
- Western Federation of Miners
- Salt of the Earth
