= Heather Gladney =

American author (born 1957)

Heather Gladney (born February 10, 1957) is an American author whose fantasy novels include Teot's War (1987) and its sequel Bloodstorm (1989).

== Biography ==
Heather Gladney was born on February 10, 1957, in Hawthorne, California. She attended University of California, San Diego (1975–1977) and received a B.S. in pomology in 1980 from University of California, Davis. She has worked in various jobs including landscaping and horticulture. She grew up in the Mojave Desert which influenced her settings and characters.

She was nominated for the John W. Campbell Memorial Award (1988), and finalist for the William Crawford Award (1988).

== Works ==
Charles Gramlich wrote:

Teot's War creates a fully realized world that combines elements of Frank Herbert's Dune, Glen Cook's Dread Empire series, the Hyborian World of Robert E. Howard, and the real world of Earth's Bedouin tribes. It contains a delightful and realistic created language. But the best element is the superb writing.

== Reception ==
Fritz Leiber reviewed Teot's War in Locus magazine. Teot's War was reviewed in Science Fiction & Fantasy Book Review Annual (1988) by Larry D. Woods who said it offered significant explorations of themes of heroism and deception. A reviewer of Teot's War in Pandora magazine commended Gladney for her well-rounded characters and setting. Susanna Sturgis reviewed Teot's War in the journal Feminist Bookstore News.

Blood Storm was reviewed by Tom Whitmore in Locus.

Author Charles Gramlich wrote of Gladney that she is "a bit of a forgotten writer" having not published a new book since the 1980s, though one with a fan base, he says "few writers had such an auspicious start to their careers" and she has influenced his own writing.

== Bibliography ==
- Song of Naga Teot: Part 1: Teot's War (1987)
- Song of Naga Teot: Part 2: Bloodstorm (1989)
- The Tale of the Virtual Cat, Catfantastic IV (book), DAW Books (1996)
- Blessed Event, Dead of Night (1994)
- "Be Careful What You Ask For", Midnight Zoo magazine, Vol.1 No.3, essay (May–June 1991)
- Season of Sorrows, with Janny Wurts, Elfquest Against the Wind, Vol.4, Tor (1990)
- A Devotee of Conscience, Pandora magazine, No.20 (Summer 1988)
- Teot's Warning (partially performed, libretto of a musical with Tim Randles) (1989)
