= Union Colliery Company =

- Industry: mining
- Founded: St. Louis
- Successor: East St. Louis Light and Power
- Products: coal

The Union Colliery Company was a bituminous coal mining company based in St. Louis Missouri. The company had branch offices in Milwaukee, Racine, and Kenosha, Wisconsin, as well as Detroit, Michigan.

The company was acquired in 1937 by East St. Louis Light and Power. This company eventually became Union Electric Company. It remained a subsidiary until ceasing operations in June, 1958.

== Mines ==
The company operated the following mines:

- Kathleen, Dowell, IL

== See also ==
- Coal companies of the United States
- Coal mining in the United States
