= Jeffrey Gramlich =

American academic

- Education: Western State College of Colorado (BA); University of Denver (MAcc); University of Missouri (PhD)
- Occupation: Professor

Jeffrey D. Gramlich is an accounting professor at Washington State University, where he holds the position of Director of the Hoops Institute of Taxation Research and Policy. Additionally, Gramlich occupies the role of Howard D. and B. Phyllis Hoops Endowed Chair.

== Education ==
Gramlich holds a B.A. in Accounting from Western State College of Colorado, an M.Acc. (Master of Accountancy) from the University of Denver, and a Ph.D. in Accountancy from the University of Missouri-Columbia. He passed the Certified Public Accountant (CPA) examination in 1980 and became a licensed CPA in Colorado in 1981.

== Academic positions ==
Gramlich has held the Howard D. and B. Phyllis Hoops Endowed Chair in the accounting department at Washington State University since 2014. He currently serves as director of the Hoops Institute of Taxation Research and Policy. His role includes developing WSU's professional tax programs.

He served as a visiting associate professor in the Department of Accounting and Auditing at the McCombs School of Business at the University of Texas at Austin from 1995 to 1996, where he taught corporate tax for fifth-year students in the graduate professional accounting program.

From 1994 to 2003, Gramlich was a professor of accountancy at the Shidler College of Business at the University of Hawaii–Manoa. He was promoted to professor in June 2000, having previously earned tenure and promotion to associate professor in June 1994.

From 1996 to 2006, Gramlich was a guest professor at Copenhagen Business School in Denmark. He collaborated on research with Danish colleagues and taught financial accounting in the MBA program, financial accounting and financial statement analysis in the B.Sc. International Business program, and financial accounting in the summer University Program.

From 2001 to 2003, he was a visiting professor at the University of Michigan Ross School of Business, where he taught MBA and undergraduate courses in financial statement analysis and valuation. He also taught the MBA core financial accounting course.

From 2003 to 2014, he served as the L.L. Bean/Lee Surace Professor of Accounting at the University of Southern Maine. He was appointed the university's first endowed chair and taught courses in financial statement analysis and financial accounting.

== Selected publications ==
- Buccina, S., D. Chene, and J. Gramlich, "Accounting for the environmental impacts of Texaco's operations in Ecuador: Chevron's contingent environmental liability disclosures," Accounting Forum (2013), vol. 37, pp. 110–123.
- Artz, N., J. Gramlich, and T. Porter, "Low-profit limited liability companies (L3Cs)," Journal of Public Affairs (2012), vol. 12(3), pp. 230–238.
- Gold, J., J. Gramlich, and D. Kerr, “How the Dodd-Frank Act affects the standard of care required of broker/dealers,” Journal of Financial Services Professionals (2011), vol. 65(2), pp. 61–69.
- Chene, D., J. Gold, and J. Gramlich, "The scope and practice of comprehensive financial planning: Survey results, current standards, and engagement letter recommendations," Journal of Financial Service Professionals (January 2010), pp. 47–59.
- Fischer, P.E., J.D. Gramlich, B.P. Miller, and H.D. White, "Investor Perceptions of Board Performance: Evidence from Uncontested Director Elections," Journal of Accounting and Economics 48, 2-3 (December 2009), pp. 172–189.
- Feng, M., J.D. Gramlich, and S. Gupta, "Special purpose vehicles: Empirical evidence on determinants and earnings management," The Accounting Review 84, 6 (November 2009), pp. 1833–1876.
- Gupta, S., J. Moore, J. Gramlich, and M. A. Hofmann, "Empirical evidence on the revenue effects of state corporate income tax policies," National Tax Journal (2009), pp. 237–267.
- Chene, D.G., J.D. Gramlich, and J. Sanders, "Is 2008 a Good Year to Elect Out of Instalment Sale Accounting?" Journal of Accountancy (September 2008).
- Gramlich, J.D., W. Mayew, and M.L. McAnally, "Debt reclassification, earnings persistence, and capital market consequences," Journal of Business, Finance & Accounting (2006), pp. 1189-1212.
- VanderLinden, D., and J.D. Gramlich, "Enhancing Risk-Controlled Returns on Excess Japanese Yen," Managerial Finance (2005), vol. 31, 10, pp. 35-47.
- Gramlich, J.D., P. Limpaphayom, and S. G. Rhee, "Taxes, keiretsu affiliation, and income shifting," Journal of Accounting and Economics (2004), vol. 37, pp. 203-228.
