= Hermann Gramlich =

German footballer

Personal information
- Date of birth: 24 April 1913
- Place of birth: Villingen, Germany
- Date of death: 6 February 1942 (aged 28)
- Place of death: Bardino, Yukhnovsky District, Russian SFSR, Soviet Union
- Position: Defender

Senior career*
| Years | Team | Apps | (Gls) |
- FC 08 Villingen

International career
| 1934 | Germany | 1 | (0) |
- * Club domestic league appearances and goals

Hermann Gramlich (24 April 1913 – 6 February 1942) was a German international footballer.

== Personal life ==
An Obergefreiter (corporal) in the German army, Gramlich died on 6 February 1942 in Bardino, Yukhnovsky District of the Russian Soviet Federative Socialist Republic during World War II at the age of 28.
