= Arthur Benedict Gramlich =

Arthur Benedict Gramlich (1904–1974) was a first generation German-American from Springfield, Illinois. A coal miner for most of his life, he fought in the multifactional mine wars in central Illinois during the 1920–1940s. Originally a member of John L. Lewis' United Mine Workers of America, he was one of the early converts to the newly formed Progressive Miners of America union. He served as president of the Progressive Mine Worker union from 1955 to 1957.
