= Charles Gramlich =

American writer

Charles A. Gramlich
- Born: October 14, 1958 (age 67); Arkansas
- Occupations: Novelist; short story writer; university professor
- Writing career
- Genres: fantasy, horror, science fiction
- Website: charlesgramlich.blogspot.com

Charles Allen Gramlich (born October 14, 1958 in Arkansas), is an American writer best known for combining science fiction and horror in his works.

== Biography ==
Charles Allen Gramlich was born October 14, 1958. He grew up on a farm near the foothills of the Ozark Mountains. Although he had three older brothers and an older sister, the closest in age was six years older than he was. The nearest child his age lived about six miles (10 km) away. As such, dogs, cats and books kept him company growing up. As a child, he came across a valley in the mountains that was so frightening to him that he could never force himself to enter it. This childhood experience formed the setting for his novel Cold in the Light.

Gramlich has an M.A. and PhD in Experimental Psychology. He is an ex-member of REHupa, the Robert E. Howard United Press Association, and is an Editor of The Dark Man, the Journal of Robert E. Howard Studies. He teaches psychology in the Greater New Orleans area at Xavier University of Louisiana. He is married to award-winning artist and photographer, Lana Gramlich, lives on the north shore of Lake Pontchartrain and has a son named Joshua.

Gramlich is the author of a dozen novels and numerous short stories. Most of his work falls into the genres of science fiction, fantasy, horror, and westerns. His first novel in paperback form was Cold in the Light, a horror thriller with science fiction elements that drew comparisons with the early work of Dean Koontz. His next three novels, Swords of Talera, Wings Over Talera and Witch of Talera, are Sword & Planet works in the tradition of Edgar Rice Burroughs' John Carter of Mars series. In 2012, Gramlich returned to those Sword & Planet roots with Under the Ember Star, a Wildside Double book, which includes The Battle for Eden, by Mark E. Burgess, on the opposite side.

Gramlich also writes poetry and non-fiction. In August 2008, Gramlich had his first poetry chapbook published, a collection of vampire haiku entitled Wanting the Mouth of a Lover. Spec House of Poetry is the publisher.

In 2009, Gramlich had a collection of his nonfiction essays on writing published under the title Write With Fire. Borgo Press, an imprint of Wildside Press, is the publisher. He also had a textbook published called Writing in Psychology: A Guidebook. This book is a collaboration with two of Gramlich's colleagues, Dr. Y. Du Bois Irvin and Dr. Elliott Hammer. It was also published by The Borgo Press.

In 2010, Borgo Press published a collection of Gramlich's sword and sorcery short stories under the title Bitter Steel. In 2011, Borgo published a collection of his vampire and werewolf stories under the title Midnight in Rosary. In 2012, a collection of Gramlich's horror stories entitled In the Language of Scorpions, was published through Borgo.

Starting in 2010, Gramlich began self publishing some of his short stories and novella length works as ebooks through Amazon and Barnes & Noble.

In 2020, Gramlich began writing for Wolfpack Publishing under the publisher's Pen name, A. W. Hart.

== Influences ==
Major influences on Gramlich's work include authors such as Edgar Rice Burroughs, Robert E. Howard, Louis L'Amour, Ray Bradbury, John D. MacDonald, and Kenneth Bulmer Perhaps because of this wide range of influences, Gramlich has indicated as a goal that he would like to publish something in every genre. So far, he has "published science fiction, westerns, children's stories, thrillers, mysteries, literary stories, poetry, romance, nonfiction essays and articles, and memoir." Most of what he writes is "fantasy, horror, and western."

== Bibliography ==
=== Novels ===
- Cold in the Light, Invisible College Press, 2002. (Out of Print)
- Swords of Talera, Borgo Press, 2007.
- Wings Over Talera, Borgo Press, 2007.
- Witch of Talera, Borgo Press, 2007.
- Under the Ember Star, Borgo Press, 2012. (Wildside Double #25)
- Wraith of Talera, Borgo Press, 2016.
- Gods of Talera, Borgo Press, 2016.
- The Scarred One, Sundown Press, 2018. (Writing as Tyler Boone)
- Avenging Angels #7: The Wine of Violence, Wolfpack Publishing, 2020. (Writing as A. W. Hart)
- Vengeance of the Black Rose, Wolfpack Publishing, 2020. (Writing as A. W. Hart)
- The Ranger: Concho, Wolfpack Publishing, 2021. (Writing as A. W. Hart)
- The Ranger: Hot Blue & Righteous, Wolfpack Publishing, 2021. (Writing as A. W. Hart)
- The Ranger: Path of Evil, Wolfpack Publishing, 2021. (Writing as A. W. Hart)

=== Serials ===
- Swords of Talera (Part 1), Startling Science Stories, #17, December 1998, pp. 44–78
- Swords of Talera (Part 2), Startling Science Stories, #18, January 1999, pp. 44–78
- Swords of Talera (Part 3), Startling Science Stories, #19, February 1999, pp. 44–78
- Swords of Talera (Part 4), Startling Science Stories, #20, March 1999, pp. 44–78
- Wings Over Talera (Part 1), Alien Worlds: Beyond Space & Time, #7, October 2000, pp. 45–77
- Wings Over Talera (Part 2), Alien Worlds: Beyond Space & Time, #8, November 2000, pp. 41–79
- Wings Over Talera (Part 3), Alien Worlds: Beyond Space & Time, #7, December 2000, pp. 41–80
- Wings Over Talera (Part 4), Alien Worlds: Beyond Space & Time, #7, January 2001, pp. 58–85

=== Chapbooks ===
- Wanting the Mouth of a Lover, Spec House of Poetry, August 2008.

=== Single author collections ===
- Bitter Steel: Tales and Poems of Epic Fantasy, Borgo Press, 2010
- Midnight in Rosary: Tales of Vampires and Werewolves in Crimson and Black, Borgo Press, 2011.
- In the Language of Scorpions: Tales of Horror from the Inner Dark, Borgo Press, 2012.

=== Nonfiction ===
- Write With Fire, Borgo Press, 2009.
- Writing in Psychology, (With Y. Du Bois Irvin & Elliott Hammer), Borgo Press.

== See also ==
- Sword and Planet
- List of horror fiction authors
