= Progressive Miners of America =

Former trade union of the United States

- Progressive Mine Workers of America
- Founded: September 1932
- Dissolved: 1999
- Location: United States
- Affiliations: American Federation of Labor (1938-1946)

The Progressive Miners of America (PMA, renamed the Progressive Mine Workers of America, PMWA, in 1938) was a coal miners' union organized in 1932 in Gillespie, Illinois. It was formed in response to a 1932 contract proposal negotiated by United Mine Workers President John L. Lewis, which reduced wages from a previous rate of $6.10 per day to $5.00 per day.

The union was dissolved in 1999, after decades of discontent by members.

== History ==
=== Background ===
During the first years of the 20th Century, the various organizational districts of the United Mine Workers of America (UMWA) retained substantial autonomy for the negotiation of contracts with mineowners. Among the strongest and most effective of these was UMWA District 12, encompassing the state of Illinois, which managed to negotiate for itself the highest wage scale in the United States. Although able to win a $7.50 daily wage for its members, District 12 gradually came into conflict with national UMWA leadership under union president John L. Lewis, which sought an end to district autonomy in favor of the centralized negotiation of contracts on a national basis.

Although initially opposing wage reductions under the slogan "No Backward Step," in 1928 Lewis negotiated a contract which effectively reduced the daily wage rate for Illinois miners from $7.50 to $6.10. This contract was narrowly ratified only after extensive campaigning among Illinois miners by UMWA officials, who eventually made the case for employment stability under the new wage rate rather than instability and strife if a fight was made to maintain the previous rate of wages. A general sense of dissatisfaction with Lewis and the national union leadership remained among Illinois miners in the aftermath of the signing of the new 1928 contract.

The coming of the Great Depression put additional downward pressure upon wages, as the ranks of unemployed workers skyrocketed. The new contract negotiated in 1932 by the UMWA called for a further reduction of daily wages, this time from the previous $6.10 per day to just $5.00. This contract was overwhelmingly rejected in District 12, with negative votes carrying the day by a 4-to-1 margin. Lewis was called in to personally negotiate a new contract; his second effort did not differ materially from the first. This time, however, after the ratification vote was taken, tally sheets vanished and union president Lewis unilaterally put the new contract into effect, over the strenuous objection of rank and file members in District 12.

Disaffected miners voted to initiate a series of wildcat strikes against mine operators across Illinois, with one particularly violent confrontation between striking miners and law enforcement authorities taking place on August 24, 1932, in the Southern Illinois community of Mulkeytown. Vehicles were upended and workers were shot at and beaten. Strikers believed Lewis and the UMWA leadership to be in cahoots with mineowners and lawmen in suppression of the Mulkeytown strike, and sentiment began to grow for a split of Illinois miners from the national union.

=== Formation ===
On September 1, 1932, barely a week after the violence at Mulkeytown, disaffected representatives of the Illinois miners gathered at Gillespie and voted to split from the UMWA in favor of their own organization, to be called the Progressive Miners of America (PMA). Approximately 18,000 miners were members of the organization at the time of its formation.

Rejecting Lewis's autocratic, personalized leadership, the new union adopted democratic policies and instituted measures intended to ensure that their leaders would be held accountable to the membership. The new union embodied an alternative definition of unionism which broadened its role beyond wage agreements and worker grievances. Labor scholar Staughton Lynd defines alternative unionism or community-based unionism as "democratic, deeply rooted in mutual aid among workers in different crafts and work sites, and politically independent."

This class conception of labor extended to include women. Historian Caroline Waldron Merithew notes, "the PMA was one of the few movements in which non-wage-earning women became leaders in organizing an industry that employed only male labor."

=== Recognition ===
Following its September 1932 formation, the PMA immediately sought to negotiate a new wage agreement for Illinois miners. A wage conference was called in Edwardsville, Illinois in October, attended by a dissident segment of the state's mine operators, who were themselves divided as to the approach to be taken towards the organized labor movement. The contract negotiated between the dissident miners of the PMA and the dissident mine operators proved to be virtually identical to the agreement earlier rejected by the Illinois rank-and-file, ironically. The PMA did gain official recognition and an automatic dues check-off system, concessions necessary for the group's survival but failed to restore daily wage levels to the abandoned 1928 rate. Picketing against mines which refused to recognize the PMA was begun.

In response to the Illinois split, the Lewis-led UMWA began immediate negotiations with the mainline members of the Illinois Coal Operators Association, agreeing upon a two-year extension of the new and reduced wage rates, which had been previously packaged as an "emergency" measure. The two rival unions and groups of operators stood in opposition to one another for the rest of the decade, with the UMWA retaining its hold over key coal mines in Southern Illinois through its closed shop agreement.

Repeated demands for statewide recognition elections by the union were also rejected by the National Labor Board, which refused to intervene in favor of either union, instead letting the contracts negotiated by the rival unions stand. Law Professor Jim Pope writes, "By early 1934, exit from the UMW was no longer a viable option for union miners. With the cooperation of employers and courts, the UMW had used its quasi-governmental position to withering effect against the alternative unions."

=== 1937 Racketeering charges ===
The PMA suffered a crucial blow in 1937 when 39 members were indicted in federal court on anti-racketeering charges. Although the defense provided compelling evidence of UMWA collusion with the Peabody Coal Company, the jury returned guilty verdicts for the accused. Subsequently, 34 received federal prison sentences, many serving time in Leavenworth, Kansas.

=== American Federation of Labor recognition ===
The union was also torn internally. Conservative leaders resisted the efforts of radicals to expand the alternative formation of the union. Red-baiting was adopted to attack and discredit left-leaning members.

In the spring of 1938, with Lewis and the UMWA having left the staid American Federation of Labor (AF of L) to help form the rival Congress of Industrial Organizations (CIO), the AF of L offered a national charter to the Progressive Miners of America. This offer was accepted and the name of the organization was changed at this time to the Progressive Mine Workers of America (PMWA). Under the AF of L's umbrella the PMWA approximately doubled its original membership during subsequent years, topping the 35,000 mark by the end of World War II.

=== Organizational structure ===
The Progressive Miners of America governed itself through biannual conventions and maintained national headquarters in Springfield, Illinois. The group issued an official organ during its salad days, a weekly newspaper called Progressive Miner.

=== Return to independent status and decline ===
This national affiliation with the AF of L proved to be short-lived, however, as in 1946 the larger and stronger United Mine Workers of America rejoined the AF of L, regaining national jurisdiction and forcing the PMWA out of the organization. A lengthy period of decline began, with membership and organizational clout of the PMWA atrophying in subsequent decades.

While the union formally continued to exist until 1999, its possibility to offer mine workers a genuine alternative dissolved decades earlier. Paired against the combined forces of the UMWA, the state and federal government, and the coal operators, the Progressives were hindered at every turn.

== See also ==
- Arthur Benedict Gramlich
- The Ladies Auxiliary of the International Union of Mine Mill and Smelter Workers
- Western Federation of Miners
