= Abert =

Abert is a surname. Notable people with the surname include:

- John James Abert (1788–1863), American cartographer
- James William Abert (1820–1897), American explorer
- Johann Joseph Abert (1832–1915), German composer
- Hermann Abert (1871–1927), German music historian

== See also ==
- ABERT, a Brazilian radio and television association
- Abert Rim, a fault scarp in Oregon, United States
- Abert's squirrel
- Abert's towhee
