= East Lake Abert Archeological District =

Historic district in Oregon, United States

- U.S. National Register of Historic Places
- U.S. Historic district
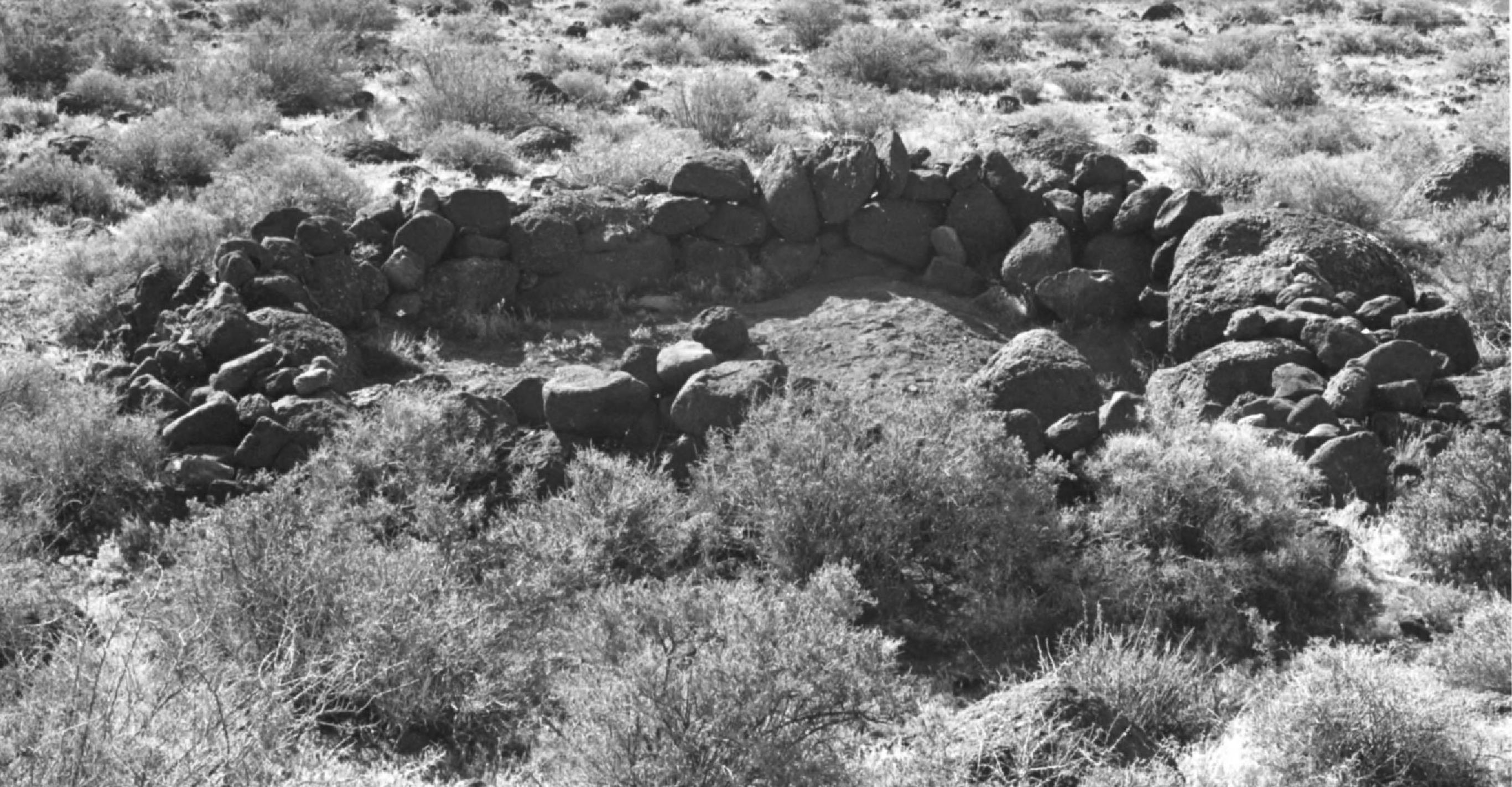
- Prehistoric stone house ring
- Location: Lake County, Oregon, U.S. Address restricted
- Built: Over the past 11,000 years
- Architectural style: Prehistoric house pits and rock art
- NRHP reference No.: 78002295
- Added to NRHP: 29 November 1978

The East Lake Abert Archeological District is an area in Lake County, Oregon, United States, that features numerous prehistoric camp sites and petroglyphs. It is located along the eastern shore of Lake Abert on land administered by the Bureau of Land Management and the Oregon Department of Transportation. The site includes stone-walled house pits and prehistoric rock art made by ancient Native Americans who occupied the site for approximately 11,000 years. Because of its unique archaeological and cultural significance, the East Lake Abert Archaeological District was listed on the National Register of Historic Places in 1978.

== Prehistoric environment ==
Following the last ice age, melt water accumulated in the closed basins of what is now south-central Oregon. As a result, pluvial lakes covered much of Oregon's high desert country. This included the area around what is now Lake Abert. During this period, the area was home to mammoths, bison, horses, camels, and mountain sheep. The abundant wildlife drew prehistoric hunters to the area as well.

About 7,500 years ago, the climate changed and the great pluvial lakes began to recede. As the lakes shrank, the mammoths, horses, and camels disappeared. Nevertheless, the area around Lake Abert and the marshes and meadows along the Chewaucan River, south and west of the lake, remained ideal habitat for wildlife including numerous small mammal species and many varieties of waterfowl. As a result, ancient people continued to occupy the area around Lake Abert.

Little is known about the people who occupied the land, except that they lived and hunted near ancient Lake Abert. Early inhabitants camped, built villages, and carved petroglyphs on boulders along the east shore of Lake Abert for approximately 11,000 years. Over that long period of time, the area had one of the highest human occupation densities found anywhere in the northern region of the Great Basin.

== Archeological surveys ==
There have been two major archeological surveys conducted along the eastern shore of Lake Abert. The first survey was conducted between 1932 and 1935 by Luther Cressman. In 1975 and 1976, David L. Cole and Richard M. Pettigrew of the University of Oregon conducted a second survey prior to a highway project to realign a section of U.S. Route 395, which runs along the eastern shore of Lake Abert. The two archeological surveys identified a significant number of important cultural assets including house pits, domestic artifacts, petroglyphs, and pictographs. In 1985, a team from the University of Oregon published a comprehensive summary of known archeological sites around Lake Abert.

The Lake Abert sites represent at least 11,000 years of human occupation. Archeologists have divided the occupation timeline into six periods. The oldest is the Initial Archaic period from 11,000 to 7,000 years ago. This period is identified by the Great Basin stemmed projectile points found at the Initial Archaic sites. The second period is the Early Archaic which stretched from 7,000 to 4,000 years ago. This period is identified by the northern side-notched points found at Early Archaic locations. The Middle Archaic period covers 4,000 to 2,000 years ago and is divided into two sub-periods. The earlier sub-period is identified by the Gatecliff split-stem points found at its sites, and the more recent sub-period is identified by its Elko series points. The Late Archaic period, which lasted from 2,000 years ago until the mid-18th century, also has two sub-periods. The earlier sub-period is identified by a mix of Elko and Rosegate series points found at its locations, and the last period has only Rosegate points.

Because the prehistoric house pits and petroglyphs along the eastern shore of Lake Abert have great archeological value and are located on federal lands, they have been identified for protection. Like most government-owned prehistoric cultural and rock art sites, the Lake Abert location is officially designated as an "Area of Critical Environmental Concern". This ensures that these valuable cultural resources are preserved and protected.

Because of its cultural significance and unique archaeological value, the East Lake Abert Archeological District was listed on the National Register of Historic Places on 29 November 1978. The Bureau of Land Management has mapped and documented the Lake Abert archeological sites to record its condition. Photographs are used to compare site conditions over time. Volunteers from the Archaeological Society of Central Oregon help Bureau of Land Management cultural and law enforcement specialists monitor the site.

== House pits ==
The original archeological surveys located 32 prehistoric sites along a 12-mile (19 km) section of the eastern shore of Lake Abert. These sites include 21 village areas with at least 371 house pits; 51 of these are round stonewall house pits. Five additional sites have cultural debris, but no house pits. The remaining six sites are clusters of petroglyphs. By 1990, an additional 280 sites were identified.

Today, over 580 house pits and 70 rock rings have been identified at the Lake Abert sites. Many of these sites also have fire hearths, grinding stones, and flaked stone debris. There are very few house pits from the Initial or Early Archaic periods. Most of the villages were built during the Middle Archaic period, so their use period is within the past 4,000 years.

== Petroglyphs ==
The East Lake Abert Archeological District has six rock art groupings plus a number of stand-alone petroglyphs and pictographs located throughout the district. All of the rock art is found on loose boulders that have rolled down from Abert Rim. During the two archeological site surveys, numerous petroglyphs were recorded along with 92 pictographs. There are also some combined or overlapping designs that include both petroglyph and pictograph features.

The rock art designs include both creatures and geometric designs. Among the animal figures are snakes, lizards, and horned toads. Some of the snakes are obviously rattlesnakes, with rattles clearly visible as part of the design. The geometric designs include circles, loops, wavy lines, and some more complex patterns.

== Location ==
The East Lake Abert Archeological District is in Lake County, Oregon. The district covers approximately 300 acres (120 ha) of Bureau of Land Management and Oregon Department of Transportation land along a 12-mile (19 km) section of U.S. Route 395. This section of highway is located between the small unincorporated community of Valley Falls and the north end of Lake Abert. While some of the house pits and petroglyphs are close to the highway, there are no signs or markers to identify the historic district. This helps to protect the fragile archeological sites within the district.
