= Chandler State Wayside =

State Park in Lake County, Oregon, US

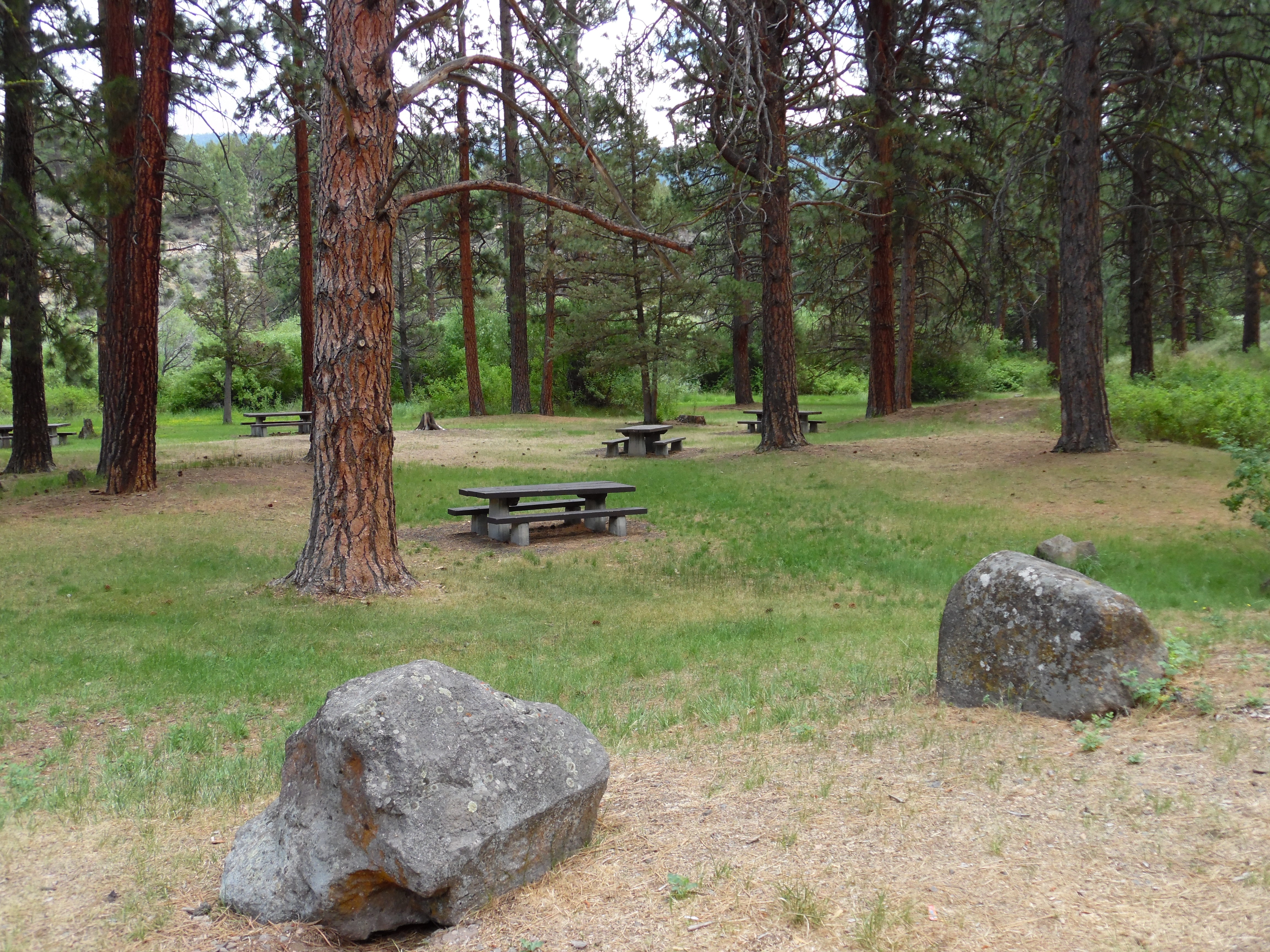
- Picnic area at Chandler State Wayside

- Location within Oregon Location within the United States
- Interactive map of Chandler State Wayside
- Type: Public, state
- Location: Lake County, Oregon
- Nearest city: Lakeview
- Coordinates: 42°24′26″N 120°17′23″W
- Area: 85 acres (34 ha)
- Elevation: 4,491 feet (1,369 m)
- Operator: Oregon Parks and Recreation Department

Chandler State Wayside (also known as Chandler State Park) is a state park in south-central Oregon in the United States. It is named in honor of Solomon and Hattie Chandler, who donated the land for the park. The park covers 85 acres (34 ha) of pine forest along a creek. The park provides restrooms and other basic facilities to accommodate the traveling public. Chandler State Wayside is administered by the Oregon Parks and Recreation Department.

== Park ==
Chandler State Wayside is a day-use park that runs along both sides of U.S. Route 395, approximately 16 miles (26 km) north of Lakeview, Oregon. The wayside provides a stopping place along Oregon's Outback Scenic Byway. The public park area is located on the west side of the highway in a grove of large ponderosa pine. Crooked Creek flows through the park, just east of the developed wayside area.

The park has picnic tables, potable drinking water, and flush toilets. The wayside provides access to fishing spots along Crooked Creek, where rainbow trout can be found. Chandler State Wayside is also a good area for wildlife viewing. There is no fee to use the park area. The wayside has approximately 41,700 day-use visitors each year.

== History ==
The park property was donated to the state by Solomon and Hattie Chandler. The Chandlers were early settlers in Lake County, Oregon. They established their ranch in the latter part of the 19th century. By the 1920s, they were among the largest land owners in the area. At that time, their ranch extended from the north end of Abert Lake through the Valley Falls area into the Crooked Creek valley. They also owned some dispersed parcels of land in the Goose Lake Valley north of Lakeview. The Chandlers grazed large sheep herds and some cattle on their ranch.

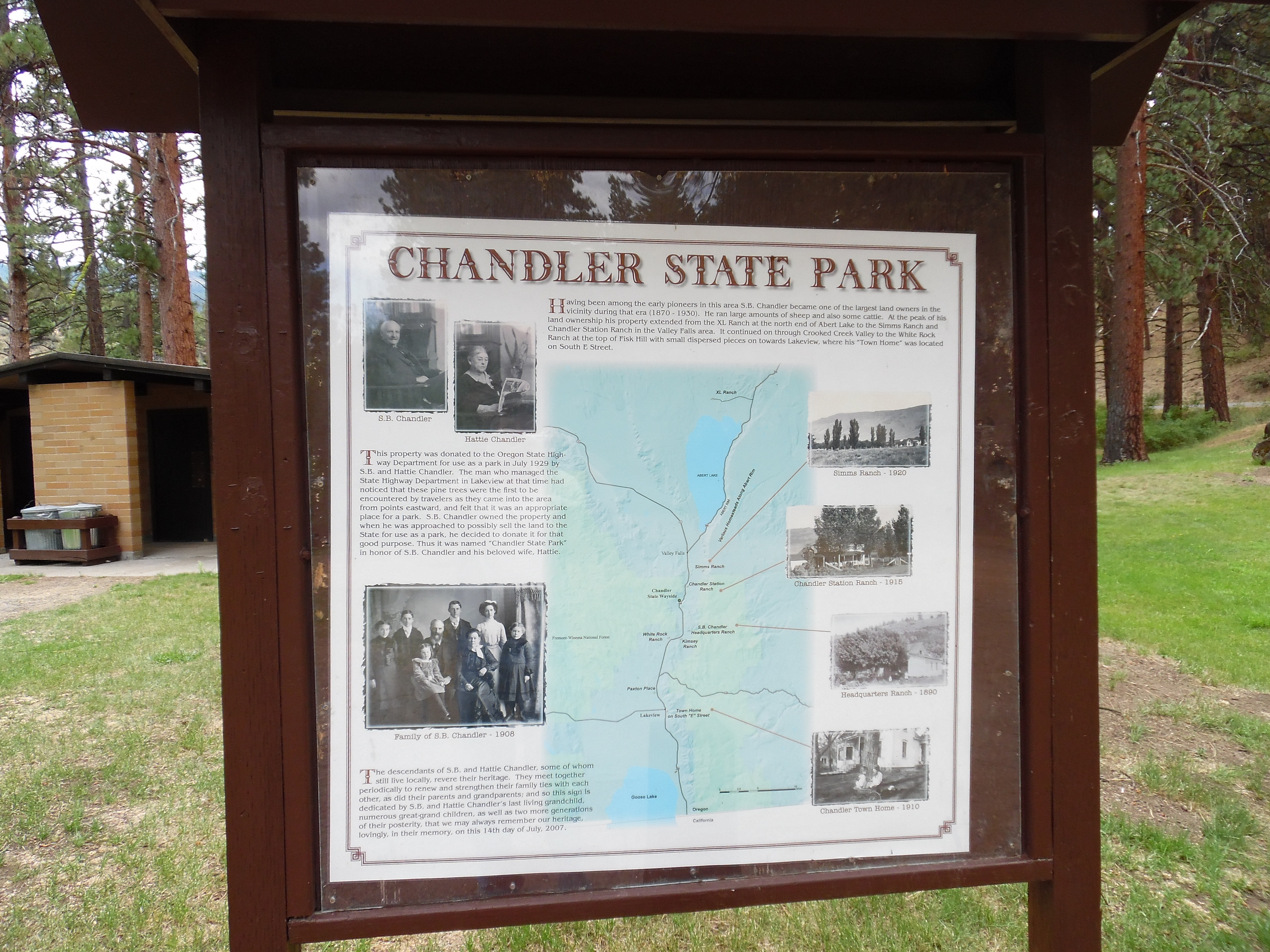
Interpretive sign with park history

The Chandler ranch included property on Crooked Creek. In one area along the creek, there was a stand of large ponderosa pine. These were the first large pine trees that travelers encountered when approaching the area from high desert county to the north and east. In the mid-1920s, the state highway department offered to buy the pine-covered property along the creek for use as a roadside park. Instead of selling the land, the Chandlers decided to donate the property to the State of Oregon in July 1929. The state named the park in honor of the Chandlers.

In the mid-1960s, the section of Route 395 adjacent to Chandler State Wayside was relocated. As part of this project, the State of Oregon purchased additional land to expand the park and ensure convenient access from the highway. Today, the park covers 85 acres (34 ha) and is administered by the Oregon Parks and Recreation Department.

== Wildlife ==
Chandler State Wayside is a stop on the Basin Range and Birding Trail. Because of the park's riparian and pine forest habitats, a wide variety of bird species can be found there. In the summer, common birds include mountain chickadees, pygmy nuthatches, brown creepers, Bullock's orioles, black-headed grosbeaks, and western tanagers. There are also three sapsucker species in the area, Williamson's sapsuckers, red-naped sapsuckers, and red-breasted sapsucker. Bluejays, white-headed woodpeckers, northern pygmy owls, and long-eared owls are native to the area as well. In addition, several warbler, vireo, and sparrow varieties are common in the spring and fall during migration.

Some of the mammals common to the area include mule deer, coyotes, American black bear, and bobcats. Smaller mammals include white-tailed jackrabbits, golden-mantled ground squirrel, least chipmunks, and deer mice.

Crooked Creek is a tributary of the Chewaucan River. The creek provides habitat for crawfish as well as rainbow trout and speckled dace. The Oregon Department of Fish and Wildlife allows trout fishing on Crooked Creek from mid-May through the end of October.

== See also ==
- List of Oregon state parks
