= Charles Jennings =

Charles Jennings may refer to:

- Charles Edward Jennings (1751–1799), Irish-born French general
- Charles Jennings (journalist) (1908–1973), Canadian journalist
- C. W. E. Jennings (1877–1949), businessman and state legislator in Oregon, U.S.
