= Warner B. Snider =

American politician

Buck Snider
- Former state representative Snider, 1940

Member of the Oregon House of Representatives from the 29th district
- In office 1933–1936
- Preceded by: Arthur W. Schaupp (previous District 21 representative)
- Succeeded by: C. W. E. Jennings

Personal details
- Born: September 7, 1880 Willow Ranch, California
- Died: July 18, 1965 (aged 84) Lake County, Oregon
- Party: Republican
- Spouse: Frances Matilda Jones
- Occupation: Sheriff and rancher

Warner Buck Snider, also known as W. B. Snider or Buck Snider (September 7, 1880 – July 18, 1965), was a city recorder, county sheriff, rancher, and Oregon state legislator. He was a Republican member of the Oregon House of Representatives for two terms, from 1933 through 1936. After leaving the legislature, Snider returned to cattle ranching. He served as president of the Oregon Cattlemen's Association and actively advocated for grazing rights and highway construction in eastern Oregon.

== Early life ==
Snider was born on September 7, 1880, in Willow Ranch, California, just a few miles south of the Oregon border. He was the son of Charles and Mary Edith Snider. Arriving in 1869, Snider's father was one of the first settlers in what later became Lake County, Oregon. His father managed the Willow Ranch store in California, before opening a business in nearby Lakeview, Oregon. In 1890, President Benjamin Harrison appointed his father superintendent of the United States General Land Office in Lakeview. He left the post in 1894, when President Grover Cleveland took office, and was re-appointed to the office in 1903 by President Theodore Roosevelt.

Snider grew up in the Goose Lake Valley, an area that straddles the Oregon-California border. He attended school in Lakeview, where he graduated from Lakeview High School in 1898.

As a young man in his early 20s, Snider was elected Lakeview's city recorder. In this capacity, he maintained city records, and on occasion, performed civil weddings. Although he was quite young, Snider was a popular city official. When he ran for re-election in 1903, he was unopposed. In that election, Snider received more votes than Lakeview's mayor, who was also unopposed on the ballot.

When Lakeview established its first volunteer fire department in 1904, Snider was elected the organization's secretary. In 1905, he was elected treasurer of the Lake County Development League, a group that promoted economic growth in the county. During this time, Snider married Frances Matilda Jones, whose father owned a large cattle ranch in Paisley, Oregon.

In 1906, Snider started keeping the county tax assessment account books for the Lake County Sheriff. Later that year, he began serving as part-time deputy sheriff. Snider continued as Lakeview's city recorder during this period. He also advertised his services as a land title document researcher and producer of local land title maps.

== County sheriff ==
In November 1909, Snider ran for the Lake County sheriff position as a Republican. He was endorsed by the local newspaper. The newspaper highlighted his service as deputy sheriff as well as his experience working with county and United States Lands Office records. He won the election easily, receiving 520 votes. His Democratic opponent received 355 votes while an independent candidate got only 135 votes. He took office and began serving as sheriff in January 1910.

As sheriff, Snider was one of the first people in Lake County to acquire an automobile. In 1911, the local newspaper noted that he had begun using it for his daily patrols around the town. One of the major challenges sheriff Snider faced was the enforcement of local liquor prohibition laws. When the secure storage area at the county courthouse was full of contraband liquor, Snider and the local district attorney decided to start disposing of illegal liquor where it was found rather than bringing it into town. Overall, his first term as sheriff was very successful. As a result, when Snider ran for re-election in 1912, he was unopposed.

During the summer of 1913, Snider gain wide notoriety for an arrest he made outside his Lake County jurisdiction. While he was on personal business traveling from Lakeview to The Dalles, he stopped for dinner in Bend. During the stop, Snider recognized a convict who had escaped from prison in California. After a quick investigation to confirm the individual's identity, he arrested the escapee and delivered him to the local authorities in Bend.

During World War I, Snider was appointed by the Governor to serve on the Lake County Draft Exemption Board. In Oregon, it was standard practice for the County Sheriff, County Clerk, and a local physician to make up the board. In 1917, his wife died in San Francisco, after a prolonged illness.

Eventually, Snider served four successful terms as Lake County's sheriff, completing his last term in 1918. After stepping down as sheriff, Snider focused his attention on managing the Jones Ranch, a large cattle ranching property near Paisley. He acquired partial ownership of the property through his wife. After her death, he entered into a partnership with his sister-in-law, Anna Jones, who owned the remaining share of the ranch. While he was an active rancher, Snider stayed involved in county government, serving two terms a Lake County Commissioner.

== State legislature ==
In 1931, Snider was elected vice president of Oregon Taxpayers Equalization and Conservation League, a group dedicated to limiting property taxes and reducing the cost of government. A week later, Governor Julius L. Meier appointed him to a state tax reform committee. The committee was chartered to review options for reducing taxes and improving government efficiency.

In 1932, Oregon legislative districts were reapportioned based on the 1930 United States census. As a result, old House District 21 which included Crook, Deschutes, Jefferson, Klamath, and Lake counties was broken up into several districts, including a new District 29. The new District 29 included only Deschutes and Lake counties and had no incumbent legislator in the area. Snider ran for the District 29 seat as a Republican. Ultimately, no other candidates filed for the race, so Snider won the primary and then the general election unopposed.

Snider took his seat in the state legislature in January 1933. The legislative term began with a short special session focused on property tax relief. This special session only lasted one week, ending on 7 January. He then served in the regular session that began two days after the special session closed. During the session, Snider was a member of the legislature's powerful Joint Ways and Means Committee, responsible for handling matters related to the state budget.

In August 1933, Snider was selected as a delegate to Oregon's convention called to vote on repeal of the Eighteenth Amendment to the United States Constitution. At the convention, Snider voted for repeal. The convention approved repeal. This helped ratification of the Twenty-first Amendment, which legalized the production, transport and sale of alcohol once again.

After his first term, Snider was very popular with his constituents. When he ran for re-election in 1934, he not only won the Republican nomination unopposed, but was also endorsed by the local Democratic Party. This allowed him to win the general election unopposed as well. After winning re-election, he served in the 1935 regular session and a special session later that year.

During the 1935 legislative session, he continued serving on the Joint Ways and Means Committee. From that position, he advocated for a reduction in government salaries to help balance the state's budget. He also introduced a bill to create two percent sales tax to support old-age pensions. Snider also served as chairman of the Public Lands Committee, using that position to champion agricultural interests throughout the state. Finally, he was a strong advocate for completing highway construction in eastern Oregon. In fact, he opposed lifting tolls on Oregon's coast bridges while eastern Oregon highways remained unfinished.

When Snider ran for re-election in 1936, he faced opponents in both the primary and general election. He campaigned on his record of support for economic development, lower taxes, and more efficient government. He also highlighted his support for "reasonable" old-age pensions and completion of eastern Oregon's highways. He defeated Forest E. Cooper, a Lakeview attorney, in the Republican primary. He was also favored to win the general election, but he lost by 68 votes to C. W. E. Jennings, a merchant from the small Lake County community of Valley Falls.

== Later life ==
After leaving the state legislature, Snider returned to his ranch in Paisley. He joined the Paisley School Board in 1938. He continued to serve as president of the Lakeview National Farm Loan Association, a post he had first been elected to in 1932 when the organization was first incorporated.

For the next twenty years, he was actively involved in statewide grazing and land-use issues. Snider was vice president of the Oregon Cattlemen's Association for most of the 1930s. He became the organization's president in the early 1940s. He was also elected president of the Lake County Stockgrowers Association, a local group that represented producers of all types of commercial livestock.

In 1948, Snider and his sister-in-law (who was also his ranch business partner) were injured in a taxi accident while visiting Portland. Both recovered and continued ranching. Snider died on July 18, 1965. He was buried at the Independent Order of Odd Fellows cemetery in Lakeview.

== Legacy ==
After his death, Snider's ownership share in the Paisley ranch passed to his sister-in-law, Anna Jones. When she died a decade later, her will established the Anna F. Jones Educational Foundation Fund. The foundation still exists, funding college scholarships for Paisley High School graduates. As of 2014, recipients could receive up to $14,000 per year for undergraduate studies, depending on the student's need.
