= Watershed (broadcasting) =

Time of day after which adult programming is permitted

In broadcasting, the watershed (or safe harbor) is the time of day after which programming with content deemed suitable only for mature or adult audiences is permitted. In the same way that a geological watershed divides two drainage basins, a broadcasting watershed serves as a dividing line in a schedule between family-friendly content and content deemed suitable only for a more mature audience, such as programs containing objectionable content; this can include graphic violence, strong language, and sexual content, or strong references to those themes, even if they are not shown explicitly. Many countries expect or require the transition to more adult material to not be abrupt, with the more 'mature' material appearing only later in the evening. The degree to which the watershed is publicly discussed and referred to also varies by country and culture; for English, in the United Kingdom and Commonwealth it is common to refer to programming as watershed or pre-watershed, while in the United States referring to a program as in the safe harbor is industry jargon general audiences will usually not understand.

In some countries, watersheds are enforced by broadcasting laws. Cultural differences around the world allow those watershed times to vary. For instance, in Australia, the watershed time is 19:30 (7:30 p.m.), and in Italy it is 22:30 (10:30 p.m.). In some countries, the schedule is divided into periods with progressively fewer restrictions. In addition, some countries are more lenient towards subscription television and radio or pay-per-view channels than towards free-to-air channels.

== By country ==
=== Argentina ===
In Argentina, any programmes broadcast between 06:00 or 07:00 and 22:00 or 22:30 must be suitable for all ages. There are also three other ratings, SAM 13, SAM 16, and SAM 18, which may be broadcast only during the broadcast time that is not covered by any programme suitable for family viewing.

Starting in September 2010, broadcasters must show the notices "Comienza el horario apto para todo público" (English: The time suitable for the general public is beginning) and "Finaliza el horario apto para todo público" (English: The time suitable for the general public is ending) at 6:00 a.m. or 7:00 a.m. and 10:00 p.m. or 10:30 p.m. respectively. In addition, the notice "Atención: Contenido no apto para niños, niñas y adolescentes" (English: Warning: Content not suitable for children and adolescents) is shown before news broadcasts.

=== Australia ===
On Australian television, programmes are restricted to certain times based on their rating. Since December 2015, PG-rated programmes can be shown at any time of day, M-rated programmes from 19:30, and MA15+ programmes from 20:30. M-rated programmes can also be shown from 12:00 to 15:00 on school days.

Complications with Australian time zones allow that to vary slightly in some areas. For example, when daylight saving time is in effect in New South Wales, NSW-based stations broadcasting to the Gold Coast, Queensland, would effectively push the broadcast watersheds an hour earlier, as Queensland does not observe DST; however, complaints by Gold Coast residents have forced those stations to delay prime-time programming by one hour to compensate.

With the exception of subscription narrowcast channels, anything rated R18+ must not be shown on Australian television at any time, and must be edited to fit within MA15+ guidelines. Even on subscription narrowcast channels, the owner of the channel must ensure that its content is restricted to access by those with appropriate disabling devices.

=== Austria ===
There is no legally binding watershed in Austria. However, according to its regulations, the public service broadcaster's channels do not air content that might harm the physical, mental or moral development of minors before 8:15 p.m. and when fictional programmes "not suitable for children" or "only for adults" are aired, an X or O, respectively, is added to the digital on-screen graphic.

=== Brazil ===
Television classification symbols used in Brazil

In Brazil, the concept of watershed was officially abolished on August 31, 2016, after a decision made by the Supreme Federal Court (Supremo Tribunal Federal). Despite online activism organized by some opposing parents and critics, such as Helena Martins, a journalist and representative of the National Program of Human Rights (Programa Nacional de Direitos Humanos), who created a petition on the Internet trying to prevent the decision, the Court ruled in favor of a lawsuit made by the Brazilian Labor Party (Partido Trabalhista Brasileiro), which received the support (during the lawsuit) of the Brazilian Association of Radio and Television Broadcasters (Associação Brasileira de Emissoras de Rádio e Televisão), composed of a group of several radio and television broadcasters spread throughout the country. Both organizations advocated for the national abolition of the watershed, claiming that the watershed was a kind of restriction that caused problems related to the "lack of programming freedom" on the Brazilian television.

Starting in 1990, when the Advisory Rating Coordination (Coordenação de Classificação Indicativa) of the Department of Justice Politics (Departamento de Políticas de Justiça) was established, until the August 31, 2016 Supreme Court ruling, the Brazilian advisory rating system determined not only the content rating of a program, but also imposed a watershed system, who was created in line with the Child and Adolescent Statute (Estatuto da Criança e do Adolescente), a series of regulations who determine what are the children's rights in Brazil. The watershed was composed by the following rules:

- Programs rated L (Free for All Audiences – Livre para Todos os Públicos), 6 (Not recommended for minors under 6 – Não recomendado para menores de 6 anos), and 10 (Not recommended for minors under 10 – Não recomendado para menores de 10 anos) could be broadcast at anytime;
- Programs rated 12 (Not recommended for minors under 12 – Não recomendado para menores de 12 anos) could be broadcast only between 8:00 p.m. (20:00) and 6:00 a.m.;
- Programs rated 14 (Not recommended for minors under 14 – Não recomendado para menores de 14 anos) could be broadcast only between 9:00 p.m. (21:00) and 6:00 a.m.;
- Programs rated 16 (Not recommended for minors under 16 – Não recomendado para menores de 16 anos) could be broadcast only between 10:00 p.m. (22:00) and 6:00 a.m.;
- Programs rated 18 (Not recommended for minors under 18 – Não recomendado para menores de 18 anos) could be broadcast only between 11:00 p.m. (23:00) and 6:00 a.m.

The watershed was enforced only for free-to-air television channels (both VHF and UHF); pay television channels were not required to follow the watershed, and indeed, could broadcast any program anytime.

Before 1990, during the military dictatorship and in the early New Republic, the regulator entity for the watershed was the Public Diversions Censorship Division (Divisão de Censura de Diversões Públicas) of the Federal Police of Brazil (Polícia Federal do Brasil). More known simply as the "Federal Censorship" (Censura Federal), it was this division who determined if a pre-recorded television program was eligible to be transmitted on a determined time (the Censorship Division also decided what was the content rating of these programs, and had the power to impede the broadcast of unauthorized programs, meaning that all television programs that were not broadcast live had to be previously sent to the "Federal Censorship" through videotapes to receive the authorization of transmission before they could be aired).

=== Canada ===
Content on commercial broadcasters in Canada is self-regulated by the Canadian Broadcast Standards Council (CBSC) under the CAB Code of Ethics and Violence Code. The state-owned Canadian Broadcasting Corporation (CBC) is required to follow the Violence Code as a condition of license, with enforcement handled via the Canadian Radio-television and Telecommunications Commission (CRTC).

The CBSC codes specify that broadcasters may not air programming that contains sexually explicit material or offensive language intended for adult audiences outside of the "late viewing period," which is defined as programming beginning at 9:00 p.m., and ending at 5:30 a.m. Programs that begin before 9:00 p.m. are considered pre-watershed even if they run into this time period. The watershed is based on the time zone from which the signal originates. 11:00 p.m. is the watershed for radio broadcasting; before then and after 4:00 a.m., radio stations are forbidden from broadcasting content that glorifies violence, undue coarse language, or undue sexually explicit material.

The Violence Code does provide some leniency for scheduling programs pre-watershed in order to exercise a terrestrial broadcaster's simsub rights (acknowledging that content advisories are also mandated by the code). However, in any case, no broadcaster may air material that contains "gratuitous violence in any form or which sanctions, promotes or glamourizes violence."

=== Chile ===
In Chile, prior to the establishment of content rating systems in 1993, watershed was the only way that television networks used to separate adult programs from the rest of the schedule. Back then, adult programming could only air after 21:30 (which, on most networks, coincided with the end of prime-time newscasts). It was later moved to 22:00. The Consejo Nacional de Televisión requires all networks (even pay TV channels based in Chile) to broadcast a warning shortly before the watershed (either as a standalone ident or as a lower-third); if they skip the warning, they risk facing a fine. Broadcasting the warning late also results in a fine, with TV+ receiving one in December 2020. The adult-programming period ends at 6:00 (though most networks ended it right after sign-off, as 24/7 stations weren't common prior to 2022).

In April 2024, the CNTV's president, Mauricio Muñoz, revealed in an interview that the Asociación Nacional de Televisión, the Defensoría de la Niñez and other institutions solicited the regulator to move the watershed from 22:00 to 21:00. Reasons for the change included sleep-related health issues on children with the old watershed, and prime-time newscasts becoming more violent and crime-focused. The proposal was approved on 10 October 2024, though it was said it would only be moved once it was published on the Diario Oficial. The watershed was officially moved on 5 November 2024.

=== Czech Republic ===
In the Czech Republic, only programmes that "can be watched by children" can be aired until 22:00. After 22:00, adult-oriented programmes may be aired. They had to be marked with star on either corner of image. Notably Czech Television stations (ČT1 and ČT2) were among to include this logo until 2007.

=== Finland ===
Categories of the Finnish ratings system

In Finland, all the major television companies (Yle, MTV Media, Nelonen Media, SBS Finland and Fox International) have agreed not to show 16-rated content before 21:00 and 18-rated content before 23:00. Television channels use their own discretion to decide the ratings. Before airing a programme, the channel must provide the related rating information to the governmental bureau Finnish Centre for Media Education and Audiovisual Media, which replaced the now-defunct Finnish Board of Film Classification in that capacity in early 2012.

=== France ===
Categories of the French television classification system

In France, -12 rated programmes/films are not allowed before 22:00, and -16/-18 rated programmes/films are not allowed before 22:30 and 00:00 respectively. -18 rated programmes/films may air only via satellite and cable. The period in which programmes with any ratings are permitted finishes at 06:00 except for -18 programmes, which may not be issued after 05:00.

There is also one additional rating that is not used in films: -10. -10 rated programmes signifies content less intense than -12 rated programmes. All programmes and films must display the respective icon on-screen for the duration of the programme. Before December 2012, -10 rated programmes had to display the respective icon on-screen at the start and in regular intervals.

=== Germany ===
In Germany, content suitable for ages 16 and older is permitted between 22:00 and 06:00 and content suitable for adults (18 and older) is permitted between 23:00 and 06:00. Programmes marked "Keine Jugendfreigabe" (not approved for minors) by the ratings organization FSK may thus be shown only after 23:00. Blacklisted movies may not be aired at any time. Some content rated 12 and older is permitted between 20:00 and 06:00, but there is no general watershed for such content.

If a commercial broadcaster wants to air a programme not rated by the FSK, the programme's watershed is rated by the FSF (Freiwillige Selbstkontrolle Fernsehen: Voluntary Self Regulation for TV) instead. A programme with neither rating is not usually aired by commercial broadcasters since the KJM (Kommission für Jugendmedienschutz: Commission for the Protection of Minors in the Media) may charge a fine if it finds the content inappropriate. To avoid the original watershed for a programme or to air a blacklisted movie, commercial broadcasters may ask the FSF to tell them how to cut the movie for another rating.

=== Greece ===
Greece uses a triple-tier watershed, along with a five-tier dual-tone decal scheme, displayed at the beginning and at regular intervals during all broadcasts except for news bulletins.

- A black square containing a white circle and the letter "K" (Κατάλληλο, Suitable) in black, indicates unrestricted programming.
- A black square containing a white circle and the number "8", indicates programming that is suitable for persons aged 8 and older. TV programming using this symbol is precluded from being broadcast during special children TV programming, as well as at least thirty minutes before or after that special programming.
- A black square containing a white circle and the number "12", indicates programming that is suitable for persons aged 12 and older. and is only allowed between 21:00 and 06:00, Monday through Thursday, and 22:00 and 06:00, Friday through Sunday as well as during school holidays.
- A black square containing a white circle and the number "16", indicates programming that is suitable for persons aged 16 and older and is allowed only between 22:00 and 06:00.
- A black square containing a white circle and the number "18", indicates programming that is suitable for adults (persons aged 18 and older), and is allowed only between 00:00 and 06:00. Programmes with foul language and commercials with sexual oriented nudity typically fall into this category. Broadcasting content with this rating before midnight is punishable by fine except when used in the context of a suitably labelled film, theatrical play or other media.

Furthermore, for media rated "12" and above, a special identification regarding the content of the media, is required to be broadcast at the beginning of the programme. These verbal descriptors are:

- Βία (Violence) – This programme contains depictions of violence.
- Σεξ (Sex) – This programme contains depictions of sexual or sexualised acts.
- Χρήση Ουσιών (Use of Substances) – This programme contains depictions of drug use, or of other addicting substances.
- Ακατάλληλη Φρασεολογία (Improper Speech) – This programme contains use of improper or vulgar speech.

These ratings are mandatorily displayed and verbally announced at the beginning of each broadcast. The provisions are enforced by the National Council for Radio and Television (ESR), an independent authority, whose executive members are appointed by the leaders of all parliamentary parties, preferably by unanimous consent and in extremis by an 80% supermajority.

=== Hungary ===
Hungary uses a two-tier watershed.

- Programmes rated for over 16-year-olds are allowed only between 21:00 and 05:00.
- Programmes rated for over 18-year-olds are allowed only between 22:00 and 05:00.

Hungarian television prime time ends about 23:30.

For more information about the two ratings' meaning, see Television content rating systems § Hungary.

=== India ===
India does not have a watershed. The Central Board of Film Certification (CBFC) is responsible for regulating television programming. Officially, broadcast laws permit only material rated with a U (Universal) certificate and U/A to be broadcast on television, but the law is regularly disobeyed. As many Indian households have only one television, nearly the entire broadcast day is positioned by broadcasters as being suitable for family viewing. Self-censorship of foreign series (particularly from the U.S., and including series originally aired on broadcast television) is common in order to meet more conservative content standards,

11 p.m. is typically treated as a de facto watershed, with adult content offered until 5 a.m. (and some channels, such as Zee Café, openly promoting programming blocks within the hours featuring "uncut" programming with fewer edits). The government has, at times, ordered individual programmes and films to be broadcast between 11 p.m. and 5 a.m. There have been several proposals in the past to introduce an 11 p.m. watershed, permitting programming rated 'A' (Adults Only) from then until 5 a.m., but all have been rejected by the government.

=== Ireland ===
In Ireland, there is no statutory requirement for a watershed. The Code of Programme Standards of the Broadcasting Authority of Ireland (BAI) requires television and radio broadcasters to use at least one of three methods to advise viewers of content, namely: an explicit watershed for adult-oriented programmes; prior warnings before potentially offensive programming; and/or a descriptive classification system. A 2005 survey for the drafters of the Code found that 83% of viewers thought a watershed was a good idea, and only 39% knew the pre-existing watershed was 21:00; 52% felt it should be 22:00 or 23:00. The 2007 Code specifies that broadcasters using a watershed must regularly promote it, and its start and end times, for viewers' awareness.

RTÉ Television implements a watershed of 21:00, as well as an onscreen classification system. Programmes with the MA ("mature audience") classification are shown only after the watershed. Programmes running through the watershed are treated as pre-watershed. RTÉ's guidelines state, "A cornerstone of our contract with television viewers is the watershed and the understanding that prior to 21.00 material broadcast should be suitable for a family audience. ... The immediately post 21.00 broadcast period should be regarded as a graduation period towards more adult material and due allowance must be made for the potential presence of children in the audience". More nuanced limits may also be applied; for example, RTÉ cleared a trailer for horror film Paranormal Activity for broadcast after 19:00, except during the Saturday evening film which many children watch. Virgin Media One operates what it calls "the internationally accepted watershed" of 21:00. Radio broadcasting does not apply a watershed.

In 2005, all television broadcasters operated a main watershed of 21:00. In the case of RTÉ, the less-restricted period ended at 06:30, while for Virgin Media One and TG4, which then had shorter broadcast hours, it ended at nighttime closedown. RTÉ Radio did not use a watershed. TG4 claimed it had "a number of different watersheds coming into effect throughout the day", while all stations had a second, less formal watershed at 22:00 for "material which is decidedly over 18". Quinn notes that the period from 18:00 to 21:00 attracts most viewer complaints, as "audience expectations of what should be shown often differ greatly".

The BAI's code regarding advertising and children states, "In general terms, programmes broadcast after 9 p.m. are not regarded as children's programmes. After this time, the primary responsibility for what a child is watching is seen to lie with the parents/guardians. The Code recognises, however, that children's viewing does not end abruptly at 9 p.m. and so the Code will offer some protection in the hour between 9 p.m. and 10 p.m."

=== Italy ===
According to Codice TV e minori (Code for Children and Television, 2002), all the channels must broadcast "general audience" programmes from 07:00 to 22:30. After 22:30, +14 programmes can be aired, while +18 programmes are prohibited from television altogether except for satellite, cable, and OTT premium adult channels, along with Cielo.

=== Mexico ===
Department of Radio, Television and Film (Mexico) regulates television programming in Mexico. Any programs shown on Mexican television must be classified A (suitable for all ages) for broadcast between 05:00 to 20:00. Broadcast for programs classified as B, B-15, C and/or D can be broadcast at certain times only.

- Programs rated B may be broadcast only from 16:00 to 05:59.
- Programs rated B-15 may be broadcast only from 19:00 to 05:59.
- Programs rated C may be broadcast only from 21:00 to 05:59.
- Programs rated D can be broadcast only from 00:00 to 05:00.

=== Netherlands ===
- Programmes that are rated "All ages", "6" or "9" can be broadcast all day.
- Programmes that are rated "12" can be broadcast from 20:00 to 06:00
- Programmes that are rated "16" can be broadcast from 22:00 to 06:00

The number in the age rating indicates the lowest age for which it is suitable.

Despite this system, broadcasting authorities in the Netherlands are notably more tolerant of vulgar language in comparison to other countries; limits on obscene language are typically set based on the real-life use of language by the intended audience.

=== New Zealand ===
On 1 May 2020, the new classification rating system for television (both free-to-air and subscription) was implemented, bringing it more in line with film classifications as per the Films, Videos and Publications Classification Act 1993.

- G and PG rated programmes can be shown at any time on both free-to-air and subscription television.
- M rated programmes can be shown any time only on subscription television. On free-to-air television, M rated programmes can be shown between the hours of 9:00 a.m. and 3:00 p.m. on weekdays (school term time only) and from 7:30 p.m. until 5:00 a.m. on a daily basis (including weekends, school holidays and public holidays).
- 16 rated programmes can be shown any time only on subscription television, but must be blocked if viewers under 16 are present. On free-to-air television, 16 rated programmes can only be shown from 8:30 p.m. to 5:00 a.m. 16 rated programmes may contain stronger content that may be considered unsuitable for children under the age of 16.
- 18 rated programmes can be shown on subscription television between 9:00 a.m. and 3:00 p.m. on weekdays (school term time only) and from 8:00 p.m. until 6:00 a.m on a daily basis (including weekends, school holidays and public holidays). On free-to-air television, 18 rated programmes can only be shown between 9:30 p.m. and 5:00 a.m. 18 rated programmes may contain more explicit but challenging content such as very frequent coarse language, very strong or graphic violence, very strong or explicit sex scenes, nudity or material that may be considered either too distressing or offensive to some adult viewers.

News and current affairs programmes and sporting events are exempt from the system altogether but still carry warnings before certain stories with graphic content or objectionable material.

==== Previous system ====
The previous system for free-to-air television, introduced in 1989, used the following system based on the one formerly used in Australia:

- G (General), which could air at any time,
- PGR (Parental Guidance Recommended), which could not air between 6 a.m. and 9 a.m. or between 4 p.m. and 7 p.m., and
- AO (Adults Only), which could only air between noon and 3 p.m. on school days, and between 8:30 p.m. and 5 a.m.

Subscription television has always used the current system.

=== Peru ===
Peru has adult time from 22:00 to 6:00. During the rest of the time, nevertheless, some +14 programming signs may be posted on the screen. As of 2015, there have been complaints that adult time is not enforced (either from the TV channels or the authorities) since some programs such as Combate, Esto es Guerra, Amor Amor Amor and Al fondo hay sitio have broadcast violence, or sexually suggestive material, during "unrestricted" time.

=== Poland ===
In Poland, the Czas chroniony ("Protected time") rules specify that programmes with a "12" rating or higher are not allowed to be aired during scheduling blocks intended for children, programmes with a "16" rating are not allowed to be aired before 20:00 on mainstream channels, and programmes with an "18" rating may not be aired before 23:00 on mainstream channels.

=== Portugal ===
Open channel terrestrial television stations (RTP, SIC and TVI) can broadcast programmes and films rated 16 only between 22:30 and 06:00 with permanent visual identification and usual red circle in right top on the TV screen. There are no legal restrictions on pay television, but those channels usually follow the same rules as open television, for example, the Red Circle may be displayed on the top right (or top left ); however, some channels use Spanish Ratings instead. Pornography may be aired only on encrypted channels.

=== Romania ===
The watershed on Romanian television is based primarily on age ratings; 12-rated programmes may only be shown after 20:00, 15-rated programmes may only air after 22:00, and 18-rated programmes may only be shown after 00:00. The watershed ends at 06:00.

=== Serbia ===
In 2015, the Serbian broadcasting regulator, the REM (Regulatory body for Electronic Media) introduced a two-tier watershed. The watershed is based on the new TV rating system.

Programmes marked "16" are allowed to be shown only between 10 p.m. and 6 a.m. and may contain coarse language and mild references to gambling, drugs and sex.

Programmes marked "18" are allowed to be shown only between midnight and 6 a.m. and may contain extensive scenes of drugs and sex.

=== Singapore ===
Under Infocomm Media Development Authority (IMDA) regulations, the watershed applies for programs rated PG13 (free-to-air television channels) or M18 (pay television channels), which could only be shown between 10 p.m. and 6 a.m.; NC16 and M18 content must also be subjected to edits and correct scheduling before being permitted for broadcast.

=== Slovakia ===
Slovak law defines a two-tier watershed and TV stations are obliged to show JSO's rating symbols through the entire program and also in promos.

Programmes given an 15 rating are permitted to broadcast only from 8 p.m. to 6 a.m. Programmes given an 18 rating are permitted to be shown only from 10 p.m. to 6 a.m.

=== Slovenia ===
The national public broadcaster RTV Slovenija uses three watersheds. Between 8 p.m. and 5 a.m., content rated 12+ can be shown, programmes rated 15+ are allowed between 10 p.m. and 5 a.m. programmes and 18+ rated content can be screened between midnight and 5 a.m. Cartoons and children's programmes have to be screened until 7 p.m., when the main evening newscast begins. Content rated VS (Parental Guidance) should not be screened before 7 p.m. Many broadcasters (for example local or regional channels) also take this approach in a similar way.

A warning, which has to be shown for at least 10 seconds, has to be broadcast before airing a programme with an age restriction. It consists of showing an enlarged age rating symbol accompanied by a voiceover. The warning says: "Opozorilo! Predvajana programska vsebina vključuje prizore, ki so lahko neprimerni za mlajše otroke, zato je zanje priporočljiv ogled z vodstvom staršev ali skrbnikov" (The following programme contains scenes potentially inappropriate for younger children. Parental guidance is advised.) for programmes, rated VS (Vodstvo staršev – Parental guidance). Programmes rated 12+, 15+ and 18+ are equipped with a similar kind of warning (Predvajana programska vsebina vključuje prizore, ki niso primerni za otroke do 12./15. leta starosti/otroke in mladoletnike do 18. leta starosti (The following programme contains scenes potentially inappropriate for children, younger than 12/15 / children and minors, younger than 18). Unrated programmes or programmes, meant for all audiences are exempt from the system. Examples of programmes, equipped with rating symbols include pornographic and violent content, some documentaries, newscasts (if they are shown in the timeslot meant for children's programming) and satirical shows.

Age ratings and their respective symbols currently in use are (introduced in 2014):

- VS (vodstvo staršev): Parental guidance recommended for viewers under the age of 12. A white rhombus containing parent and child stick figures is shown.
- 12: Not allowed under the age of 12. A white rhombus containing the number 12 is shown.
- 15: Not allowed under the age of 15. A white rhombus containing the number 15 is shown.
- 18: Not allowed under the age of 18. A white rhombus containing the number 18 is shown.
- 18+: Explicit sexual content. A white rhombus containing the number 18 and one plus sign is shown.
- 18++: Pornographic content/programme with severe violence. A white rhombus with number 18 and two plus signs is shown.

Programmes with 18+ or 18++ icons must not be broadcast free-to-air and are allowed on scrambled pay-TV channels only.

The original content rating icons were a red triangle with a stylised eye inside for content where parental guidance is advised for viewers under the age of 15, while content unsuitable/not allowed under the age of 15 used a red circle with a stylised eye. Such symbols were in use since 2003 and were replaced in 2007 with red inverted triangle-shaped symbols with VS (parental guidance), +12 and +15 inscriptions inside, while for 18+ rated content a red circle-shaped symbol with the letters AD was used.

Additional content type rating symbols (not shown on-screen):

- Nasilje (Violence): White rhombus, containing two stick figures; one is laying on the floor while being beaten up by the other, which is holding a baseball bat
- Strašljive vsebine (Scary content): White rhombus, containing a stylised grey ghost figure
- Spolnost (Sexuality): White rhombus, containing conjoined male and female sex symbols (circle with a cross, pointing downwards and a circle with an arrow, pointing upwards)
- Nevarno vedenje (Dangerous behaviour): White rhombus, containing a crouching stick figure, trying to jump over a fence and an open fire.
- Diskriminacija (Discrimination): White rhombus, containing three stick figures, of which the middle one is white, while the other two are black.
- Zloraba drog in/ali alkohola (Drug and/or alcohol abuse): White rhombus, containing a bottle, defaced with a stylised face.
- Neprimeren jezik (Inappropriate language use): White rhombus, containing a speech bubble with a hash sign, ampersand ("and" sign) and an exclamation mark.

Aforementioned additional content type rating symbols can accompany general age rating symbols since 2017. Content type ratings are not shown on-screen and warn the audience of the type of inappropriate content. They are only obligatory shown online on video-on-demand platforms and not during television programming

The respective rating symbol has to be shown for the duration of the programme.

=== South Africa ===
South Africa takes a very hands-on approach when it comes to what children are allowed to see on television, and the parents or guardians of the child may be fined if they are caught not following the rules. The ratings used are:

- All: Suitable for all ages. The respective icon is required to be displayed on-screen for 30 seconds at the start of the programme.
- PG: Suitable for all ages, but very young children must be accompanied at all times. The respective icon is required to be displayed on-screen for one minute at the start of the programme.
- 13: Prohibited to children under the age of 13. The respective icon is required to be displayed on-screen for two minutes at the start of the programme and after every commercial break.
- 16: Prohibited to children under the age of 16. Programmes with this rating are not allowed before 21:00. The respective icon is required to be displayed on-screen for five minutes at the start of the programme and after every commercial break.
- 18: Prohibited to children and young people under the age of 18. Programmes with this rating are not allowed before 23:00. The respective icon is required to be displayed on-screen for the duration of the programme. The content in programmes that have an "18" rating is not restricted as long as it does not have pornography, which is prohibited altogether.

=== Spain ===
In Spain, the watershed is simpler than in a lot of other countries since there is only one watershed time, but there is a quadruple-tier age rating system that is used alongside it. The ratings used in Spain are "All", "7", "12", "16" and "18". However, only 18-rated programmes are restricted. 18-rated programmes are allowed only between 22:00 and 06:00 and must broadcast a warning sound before it is shown.

=== Switzerland ===
Switzerland has no watershed. However, broadcasters are required by law to avoid any confrontation of minors with unsuitable programming through the choice of transmission time.

=== United Kingdom ===
Ofcom regulations enforce a watershed for television channels, requiring that programmes containing content that is "unsuitable for children" (including excessive justified use of offensive language, graphic and violent content, sexual content, or distressing images, or otherwise receiving a BBFC 18 rating) may only be aired between 21:00 (9:00 p.m.) and 05:30 (5:30 a.m.). Programmes that begin before 21:00 are considered pre-watershed even if they run past the watershed. Even though the watershed is at 21:00, the transition to adult content must not be "unduly abrupt", and it is expected that programmes with the "strongest" adult content be scheduled later in the night. In practice, programmes intended to air at 21:00 are usually censored for unsuitable content during at least the first 10 minutes in order to comply with this requirement.

Different rules are used for pay television networks (such as Sky Cinema); if a channel enforces parental controls that require a PIN to be entered to view the channel outside of watershed ("mandatory daytime protection"), then it may carry content unsuitable for children pre-watershed. BBFC R18 content may not be carried on television, regardless of time. Premium channels and pay-per-view services that carry "adult sex material" may only do so beginning at 22:00 (10:00 p.m.), must always be PIN-protected, and must verify that their subscribers are an adult.

The watershed is also used to restrict advertising for certain products; British law prohibits the broadcast of advertising for high in fat, salt, and sugar (HFSS) products before 21:00, while the gambling industry adopted a voluntary code of practice that prohibits most pre-watershed advertising of gambling (albeit with exceptions for major sporting events).

=== United States ===
The Federal Communications Commission (FCC) has the right to regulate the broadcast of "indecent" material on free-to-air terrestrial television and radio, because it is broadcast on publicly-owned airwaves that are licensed to broadcasters who agree to operate in the public interest. It presently enforces a 10:00 p.m. safe harbor, permitting adult content between then and 6:00 a.m. The FCC's jurisdiction in regards to content applies only to terrestrial television and radio. Cable channels may be more permissive in their content, depending on their target audience and the standards of their advertisers, while premium channels and over-the-top streaming services are often the most permissive because they are funded primarily by their subscribers.

In the 1975–76 television season, the FCC attempted to enforce a "Family Viewing Hour" policy, in which the Big Three television networks (ABC, CBS, and NBC) agreed to devote the first hour of primetime to family-friendly programming. In 1976, the rule was overturned as unconstitutional following a lawsuit by the Writers Guild of America.

In 1978, the Supreme Court case FCC v. Pacifica Foundation (dealing with a broadcast of the George Carlin routine "Filthy Words" by WBAI radio) upheld the ability for the FCC to regulate the broadcast of "indecent" material on free-to-air radio and television, citing the "uniquely pervasive presence" of broadcasting in society, and the likelihood that children could be exposed to such content by chance. From then on, the FCC enforced a safe harbor on the broadcast of indecent material between 10:00 p.m. and 6:00 a.m.

In 1987, the FCC introduced a stricter definition of indecency, defined as "language or material that, in context, depicts or describes, in terms patently offensive as measured by contemporary community standards for the broadcast medium, sexual or excretory activities or organs". The FCC also removed the previous 10:00 p.m. watershed and stated that the prohibition would apply during any time that there "is a reasonable risk that children may be in the audience". In 1988, as directed by the United States Congress, the FCC announced that it would ban the broadcast of indecent material entirely, with no safe harbor. In 1991, the FCC's proposed 24-hour ban was struck down by the D.C. Circuit Court of Appeals as unconstitutional. The Telecommunications Act of 1992 re-established a safe harbor period for indecent content between midnight and 6:00 a.m. The period was lengthened back to 10:00 p.m. and 6:00 a.m. following further D.C. Circuit rulings.

Some American television scenes famous for "pushing the envelope" (such as limited nudity on NYPD Blue) were aired in the 10:00 to 11:00 p.m. hour; however, the broadcasts were before the safe harbor in the Central and Mountain time zones, where programming scheduled for 10:00 p.m. Eastern would typically be broadcast starting at 9:00 p.m. (using a one-hour delay in Mountain Time broadcast areas). Because each U.S. time zone enters safe harbor separately (at 10:00 p.m. local time), it is possible for not all network affiliates that air an "indecent" program at the same moment to face the same penalties. Such was the case with CBS, whose affiliates faced a proposed fine of US$3.63 million for a repeat of the Without a Trace episode "Our Sons and Daughters" in December 2004. The program was flagged for depicting an orgy involving teenagers. It was televised at 10:00 p.m. in the Eastern and Pacific time zones (within the safe harbor), but at 9:00 p.m. in Central and Mountain times (outside the safe harbor). The FCC split its fine among the 111 CBS affiliates covering those time zones. After a court settlement, the network agreed to pay US$300,000 in fines.

Even though the watershed occurs at the prime time hour of 10:00 p.m., broadcast networks have usually avoided indecent content altogether to avoid reprimands from their affiliates and advertisers, and because of the constant fluctuation of indecency standards to account for changes in acceptance and FCC enforcement. In 2011 and 2012, courts overturned fines regarding a brief scene of nudity in a 2003 NYPD Blue episode, as well as fines over fleeting expletives at the 2002 Billboard Music Awards on Fox, ruling that the FCC's basis for the fines was too vague.

=== Venezuela ===
In Venezuela, the watershed is at 23:00. The period between the watershed and 05:00 is called "Adult time" according to Article 7 of the Law on Social Responsibility on Radio, Television and Electronic Media. During that block, adult-oriented programs may be transmitted as long as they do not contain hardcore pornography, political or religious intolerance, racism or xenophobia.
