= Burma Rim =

Geological formation in Oregon

Coordinates: 43.14°N 120.38°W

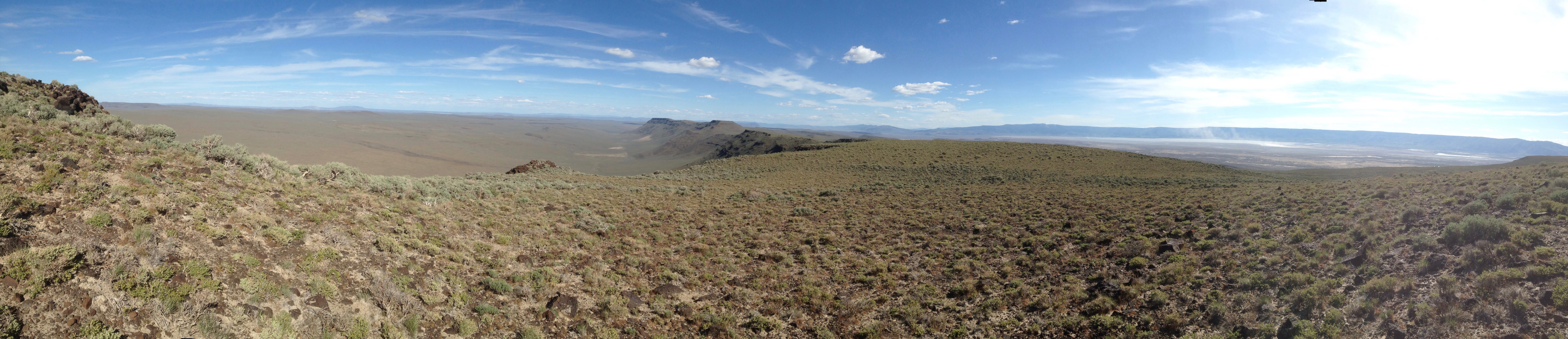
Panoramic photo of the Burma Rim

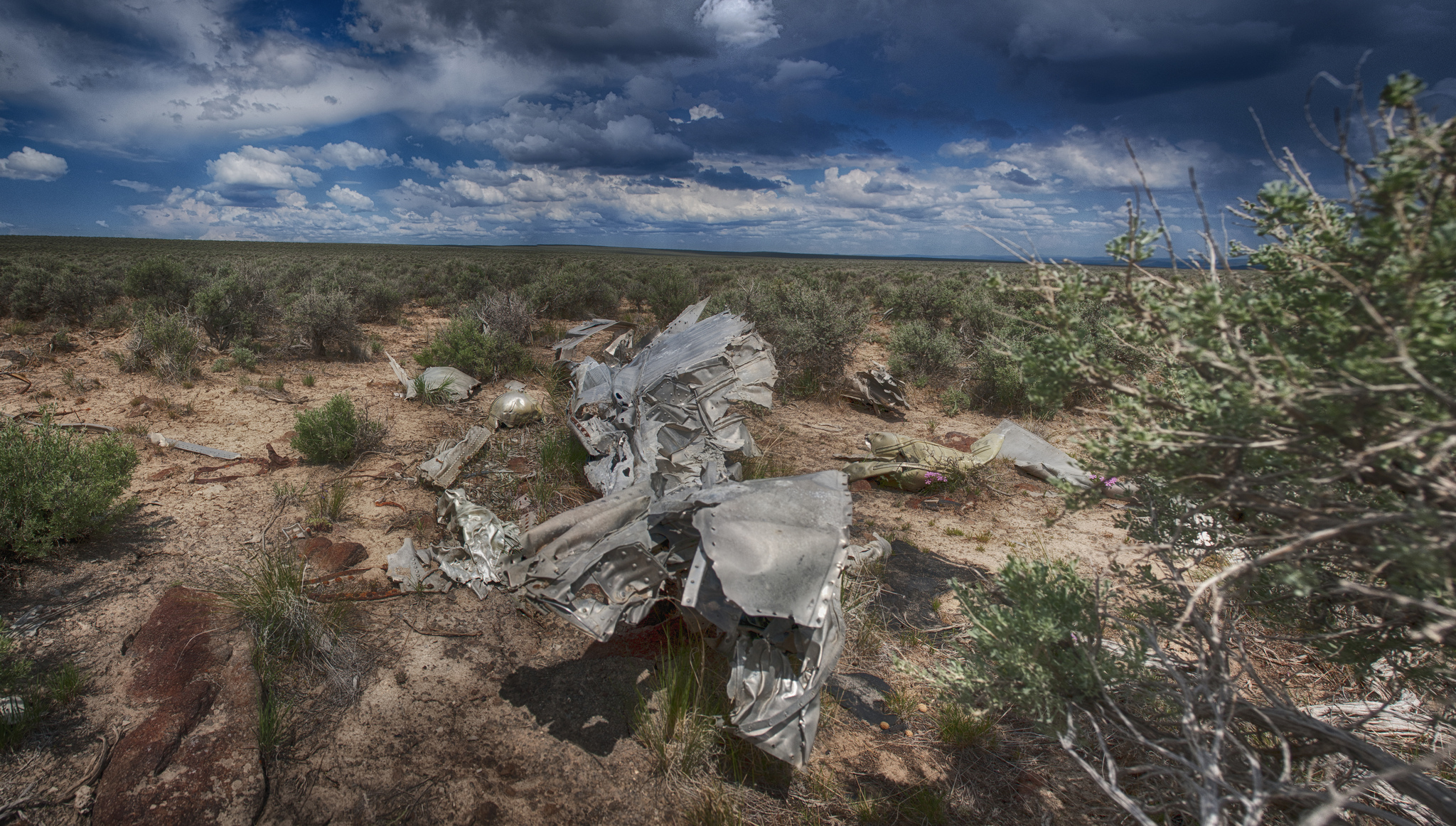
Plane crash wreckage

Burma Rim is a geological feature in the high desert of Lake County, Oregon between Christmas Valley, Oregon to the west and Wagontire, Oregon to the east. The rim was formed when it was the shoreline of a pleistocene era lake. The area is currently overseen by the Lakeview District of the Bureau of Land Management (BLM). The BLM inventoried the area. It spans 90,397 acres and includes a private inholding held by a local conservation group since 2017.

The rim includes steep escarpments and remnants of volcanic flows. It is 10 miles southeast of Summer Lake, Oregon and accessible by off-road vehicle. The wreckage of two military plane crashes are located in the area and include memorial plaques to those killed in them.

== Plane crashes ==
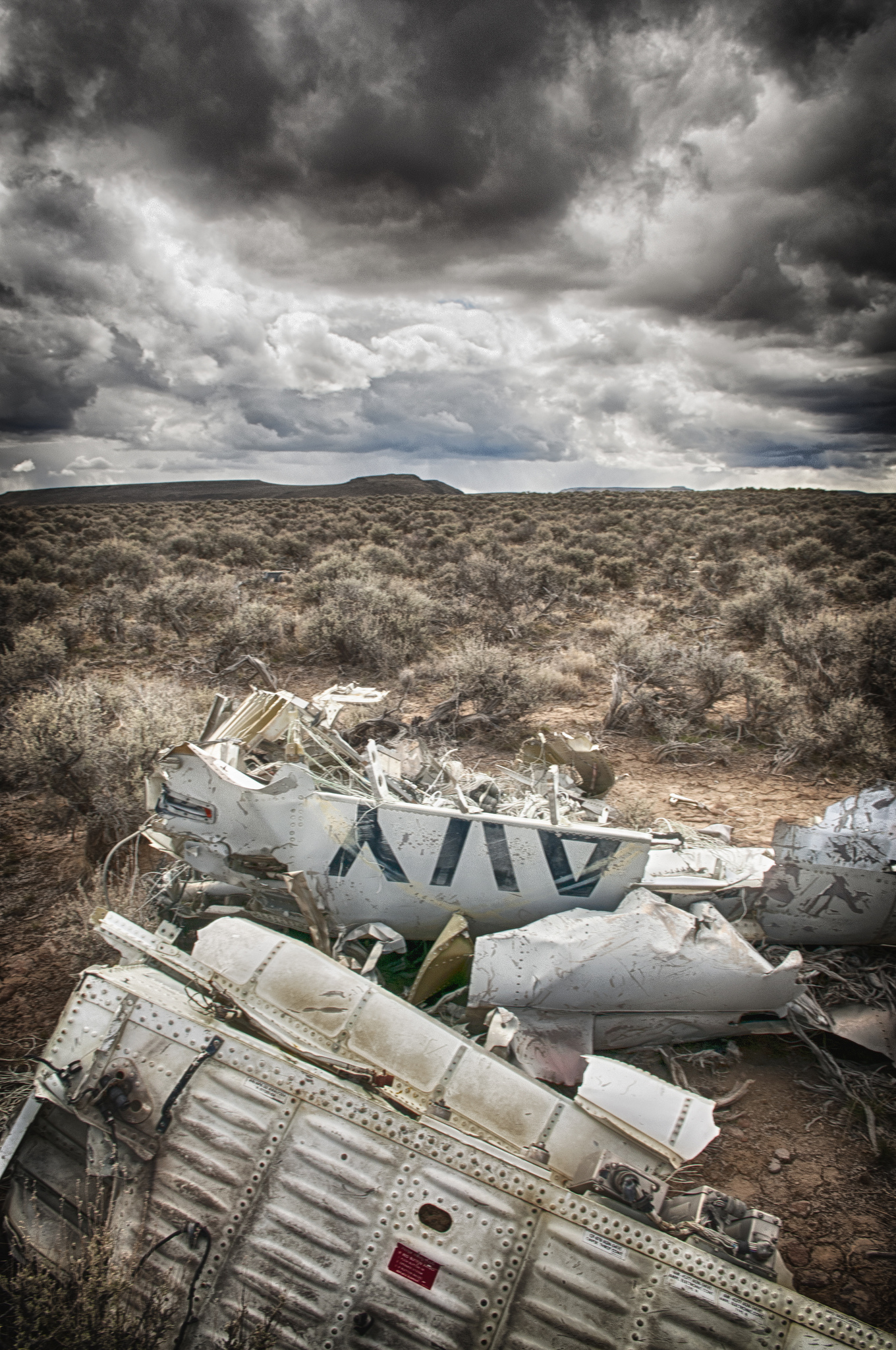
Wreckage

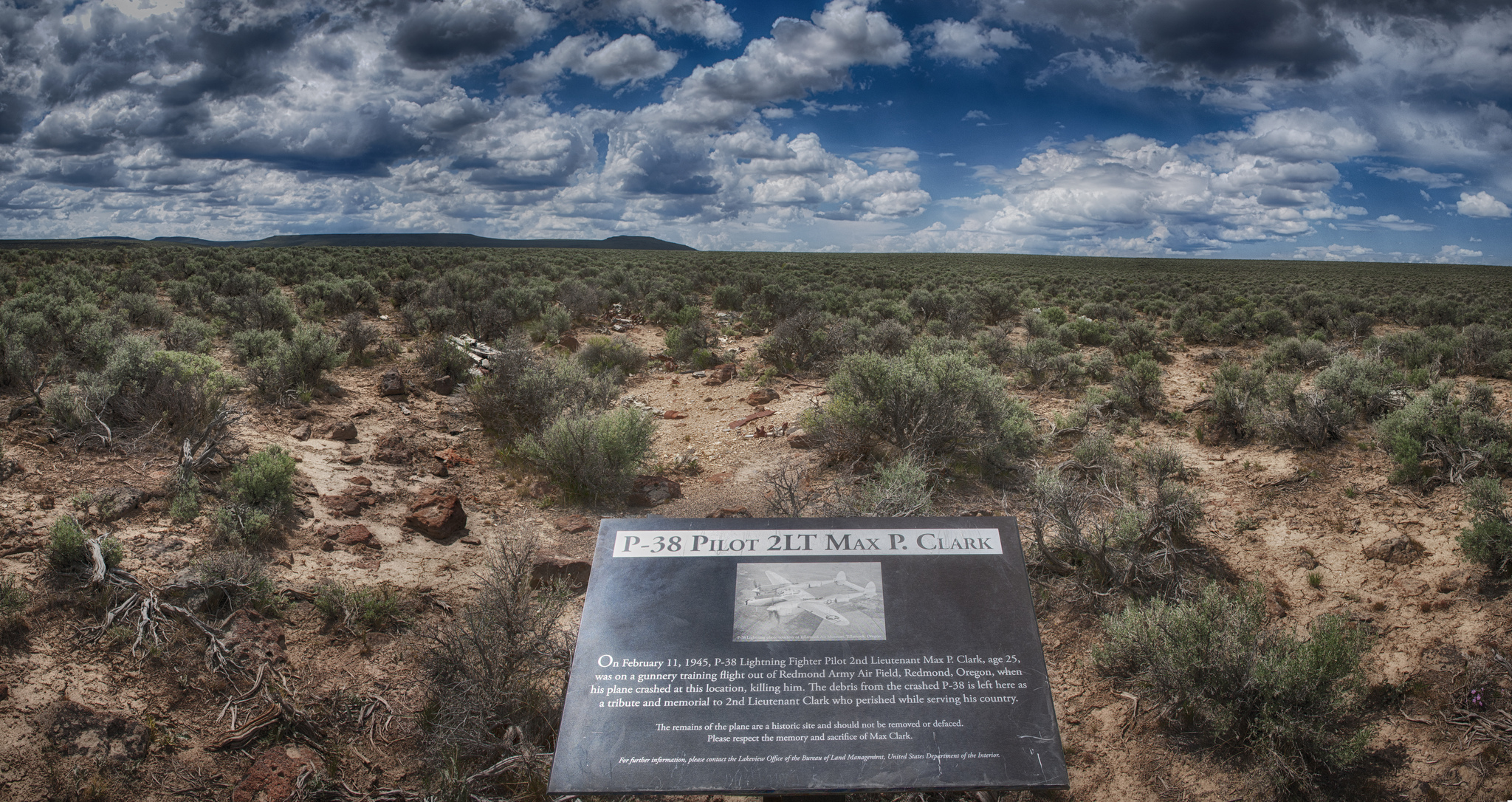
P-38 crash plaque

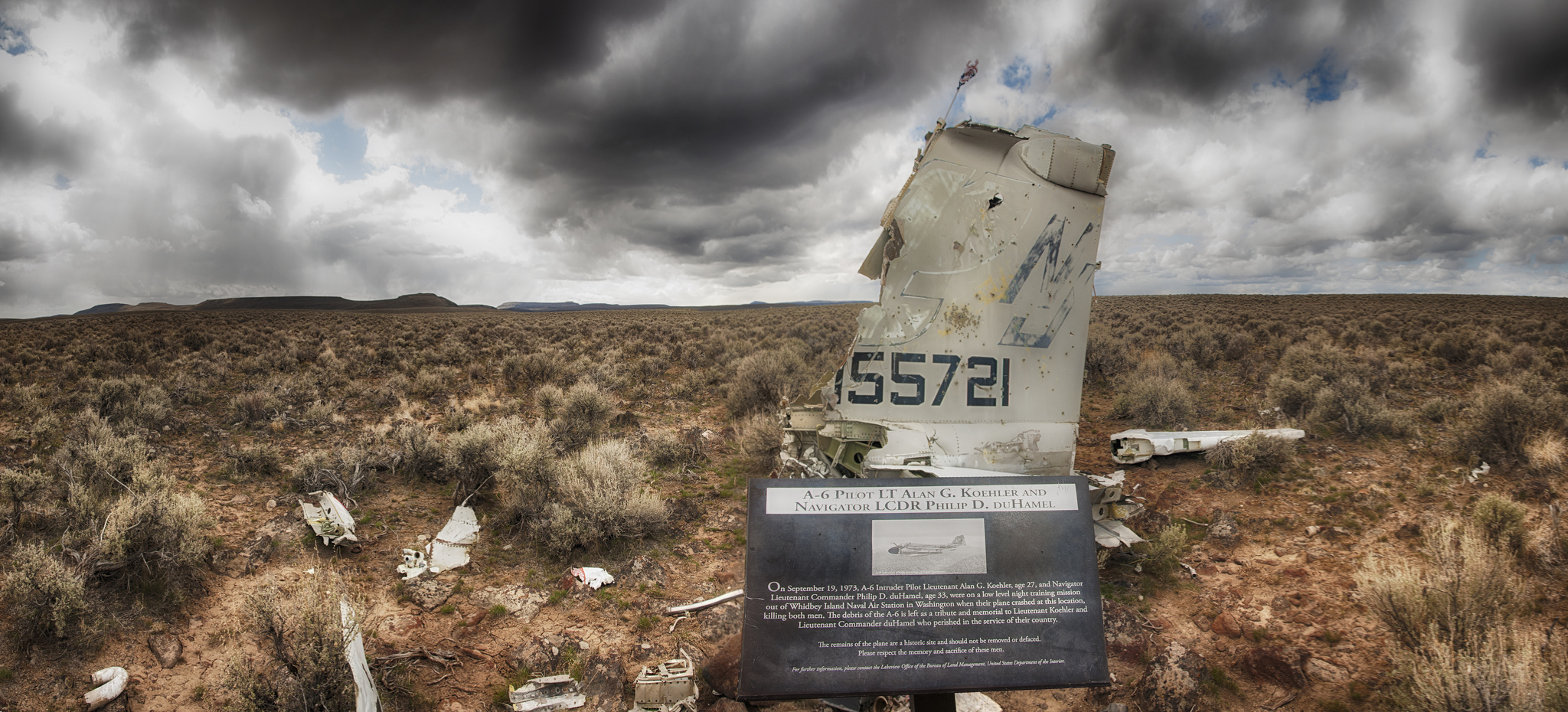
A-6 crash plaque

Two plane crashes occurred in the area. A World War II era Lockheed P-38 Lightning crashed in February, 1945 during a training flight. Pilot Max J. Clark perished. A U.S. Navy Grumman A-6 Intruder bomber from the Naval Air Station at Whidbey Island, Washington crashed during a low-level training flight in 1973 killing both men in the plane and leaving a sizable debris field. The BLM declared the crash sites historic at a Flag Day ceremony on June 14, 2007 and debuted interpretive plaques.

== Wilderness area proposal ==
The area has been proposed as a Wilderness area to protect its ecology.

== Geography ==
Burma Rim is near Hatch Lake, Dead Horse Lake, and World Lake. It runs along the east boundary with Sheep Rock at the south end of the unit. There are no permanent springs or streams, but several playa lake bed waterholes.

The vegetative cover is primarily desert sagebrush and grassland. The unit is mostly flat with a gently sloping surface. The western edge of the unit contains the large west facing Burma rim. A large shallow basin makes up the center, and several small basins are located along the edges. There are no permanent springs or streams, but there are several playa lakebed waterholes.

The approximate elevation is 4,731 feet. The area is part of critical Greater sage-grouse habitat in the region.

The 1977 inventory listed man made intrusions as transportation, utility and, grazing management related, medium in scale, but few in number. The unit was described as having stock water ponds and, roads extending into it from the north and south. Two airplane wrecks in the southwest and a power line along its east boundary. These disturbances were considered minor and the BLM concluded the area was natural.

== See also ==
- Abert Rim
