= C. W. E. Jennings =

American businessman and state legislator

Member of the Oregon House of Representatives from the 29th district
- In office 1937–1938
- Preceded by: Warner B. Snider
- Succeeded by: Burt K. Snyder

Personal details
- Born: Charles William Emanuel Jennings; February 4, 1877 Bunker Hill, Kansas, U.S.
- Died: June 5, 1949 (aged 72) Pacific City, Oregon, U.S.
- Party: Democratic
- Spouse: Besse Howe Jennings
- Occupation: Businessman

Charles William Emanuel Jennings (February 4, 1877 – June 5, 1949), known as Pop Jennings, was a businessman and Oregon state legislator. He was an early settler in the Chewaucan Valley in south-central Oregon, where he established the community of Valley Falls. Jennings was also a Democratic member of the Oregon House of Representatives for one term, serving from 1937 through 1938.

== Early life ==
Jennings was born in Bunker Hill, Kansas, on February 4, 1877. He was the son of James and Cly Jennings. He was self-educated. His schooling included several correspondence courses in railroad engineering. As a young man, he worked on various railroad construction jobs.

== Valley Falls ==
Jennings arrived in Lake County, Oregon, in 1907 after working on Harriman railroad surveys in Oregon and California. He settled at the southern end of the Chewaucan Valley, where he established a new town site in 1908. He named the community Valley Falls for a small falls on the Chewaucan River approximately 1 mile (1.6 km) north of the town site.

A post office was established at Valley Falls in 1909. The first postmaster was Ernest L. H. Meyer. However, Jennings later took over from Meyer. In 1910, Jennings and Meyer formed a business partnership to promote development in the Valley Falls area. The company was called Jennings-Meyer Realty Company.

Jennings did not always get along with his neighbors. In 1911, the local Valley Falls blacksmith accused him of assault. The blacksmith told Lake County's district attorney that Jennings had struck him on the head with a gun, causing the weapon to discharge. The district attorney did not charge Jennings because there were no other witnesses to the alleged assault.

In 1913, Jennings married Besse Howe in Lakeview. She had recently arrived in the community from Los Angeles, California. She was living with her brother near Valley Falls prior to their marriage.

During the 1920s and 1930s, Jennings continued to serve as the Valley Falls postmaster while he operated a grocery store, co-located with a gas station and tourist cabins. He also ran the Valley Falls weather station for the United States Weather Bureau, served as water master for the Chewaucan River and Silver Creek water district, and was the clerk for the local school district. In addition, he served as the chairman Lake County's Democratic Committee for two terms.

== Political career ==
Jennings, known as "Pop" to his neighbors, ran as a Democrat for the Oregon House of Representatives in 1936. He defeated the incumbent Republican, Warner B. Snider, in the general election. In that election, Jennings received 1,011 votes while Snider received only 943. He took his seat as a state legislature in early 1937, representing Deschutes and Lake counties. He served in the legislature's 1937 Regular Session.

When he ran for re-election in 1938, he was unopposed in the Democratic primary. However, he lost the general election to the Republican candidate, Burt K. Snyder. After the election, Jennings reported that he only spent $58 on his campaign.

== Later life ==
After leaving the state legislature, Jennings returned to his business in Valley Falls. Even into the 1940s, Valley Falls was an isolated place. For example, in 1943, a local newspaper reported that several airplanes landed on the highway near the Valley Falls store and then taxied up to the store's gas pump to refuel.

Jennings sold his Valley Falls businesses to Steven and Bessie Carroll in 1948. Jennings and his wife then moved to the Oregon coast. He died on June 5, 1949, in Pacific City, Oregon.

After Jennings died, his wife contested his will which left her only one-third of his assets. She claimed that the assets were jointly accumulated and had originally included significant property inherited from her family which entitled her to one-half of the estate. The probate was not settled until 1952 when the case was finally decided by the Oregon Supreme Court.
