= William Stretch Abert =

American military officer (1836–1867)

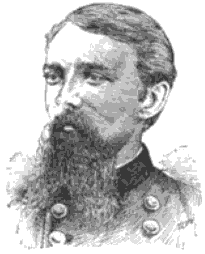
- Born: February 1, 1836; Washington, D.C., U.S.
- Died: August 25, 1867 (aged 31); Galveston, Texas, U.S.
- Burial place: Rock Creek Cemetery; Washington, D.C., U.S.
- Relatives: John James Abert (father)
- Military career
- Allegiance: United States
- Branch: United States Army; Union Army
- Service years: 1855–1867
- Rank: Colonel; Bvt. Brigadier General
- Units: 4th U.S. Artillery; 3rd U.S. Cavalry; 6th U.S. Cavalry; 7th U.S. Cavalry
- Commands: 3rd Massachusetts Heavy Artillery
- Conflicts: American Civil War; Peninsula Campaign; Battle of Williamsburg; Battle of Hanover Court House; Maryland Campaign; Battle of Antietam

William Stretch Abert (February 1, 1836 – August 25, 1867) was an American officer in the Union Army during the American Civil War.

== Biography ==
Abert was born on February 1, 1836, in Washington, D.C. He was the youngest son of Colonel John James Abert, chief of topographical engineers of the US Army. William Abert was appointed lieutenant in the 4th U.S. Artillery in July 1855. At the beginning of the Civil War, Abert was promoted to captain and assigned to the 3rd U.S. Cavalry before serving as an aide to General George B. McClellan. He participated in the battles of the Peninsula Campaign in spring 1862. After the Battle of Antietam he was promoted to lieutenant-colonel of volunteers and joined the staff of General Nathaniel Banks. After being promoted to colonel, he was given command of the 3rd Massachusetts Heavy Artillery Regiment. He was brevetted to Brigadier on March 13, 1865, for "bravery and meritorious service during the war". After the war, he returned to the army and was promoted to major in June 1867 in the United States 7th U.S. Cavalry.

Colonel Abert died on August 25, 1867, in Galveston, Texas, from yellow fever, which was an epidemic on the Gulf Coast at that time, with his death being announced by General Charles Griffin, "paying a high tribute to his memory". He was buried in Rock Creek Cemetery in Washington, D.C.
