= 3rd Massachusetts Heavy Artillery Regiment =

3rd Regiment, Massachusetts Volunteer Heavy Artillery
- Active: Jan 1863 to 26 Sept 1865
- Country: United States
- Allegiance: Union
- Branch: United States Army
- Type: Heavy artillery
- Size: 1897

Commanders
- Notable commanders: Col. William S. Abert

The 3rd Massachusetts Volunteer Heavy Artillery Regiment was a unit that served in the Union Army during the American Civil War. It was organized from already mustered unattached companies of heavy artillery raised for the defenses of the Massachusetts coast.

== History ==
Beginning in January 1863, and continuing until early 1864, twelve companies of heavy artillery were raised in Massachusetts and mustered into service to garrison the military forts along the coast of the state. The units were designated "unattached" as they did not belong to a particular regiment.

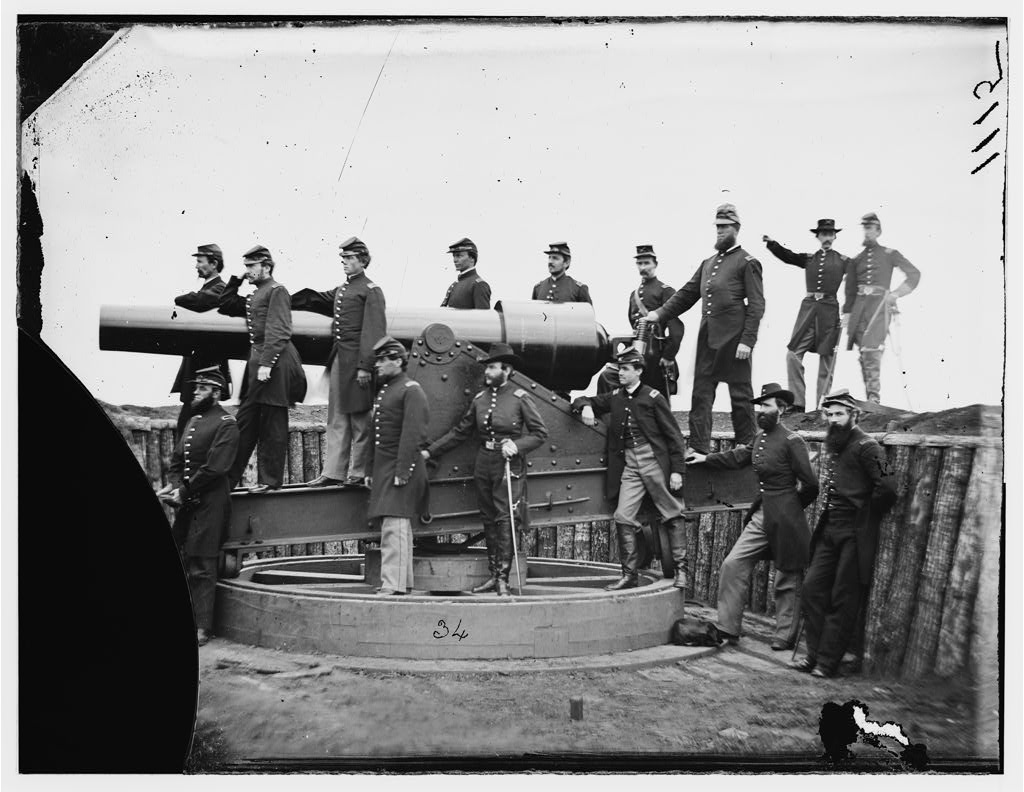
Officers of the 3rd Massachusetts Heavy Artillery, 1865

In the spring of 1864, the 3rd Unattached Company, along with the 6th through 12th, were ordered to Washington, DC, where they were to garrison the forts protecting the capital. In June 1864, the 6th, 7th, 8th, 9th, 10th, 11th, 12th, and 14th independent companies were part of the 3rd brigade, within Joseph A. Haskin's division. At the same time, the 3rd and 15th companies were part of the 2nd brigade within Gustavus De Russy's division.

Massachusetts' Governor Andrew called for the companies to be given regimental status, and when it was granted, several other companies since raised were sent to Washington to complete its complement, and was officially made a regiment in the fall of 1864. Except for Company I, the regiment continued with its duty of manning forts in the vicinity of the capital. A portion of the regiment was mustered out on 17 June 1865, while the remaining companies served until 18 September.

Company I
The 13th Unattached Company, which later became Company I, had been recruited in Springfield, MA and was largely composed of mechanics who were employed at the city's National Armory. Because of their engineering skills, they were detached from the regiment and attached to the Army of the James, and were engaged in building bridges and roads. During the Siege of Petersburg, they were in charge of holding the pontoon bridge placed across the James River. They were the last men of the regiment to be mustered out, doing so on 26 September 1865.

== The Unattached Companies ==
Company	Unatt. #	Muster date
A	3rd	10 January 1863
B	6th	19 May 1863
C	7th	14 August 1863
D	8th	14 August 1863
E	9th	27 August 1863
F	10th	16 September 1863
G	11th	20 October 1863
H	12th	20 November 1863
I	13th	10 February 1864
K	14th	12 May 1864
L	15th	30 May 1864
M	16th	August 1864

The other unattached heavy artillery companies raised in Massachusetts, the 1st, 2nd, 4th and 5th, had become the 1st Battalion Massachusetts Volunteer Heavy Artillery in 1863.

== Complement ==
The regiment consisted of 94 officers and 1803 enlisted men.

== Organization ==
In April 1865, most of the regiment was part of the Army of the Potomac commanded by major general George Meade. More specifically, split between the second and third brigades in brigadier general Martin Davis Hardin's division:

Second Brigade (Colonel William S. Abert)

- 3rd Massachusetts Heavy Artillery, Company A - Captain Benjamin A. Ball
- 3rd Massachusetts Heavy Artillery, Company D - Lieutenant Lewis R. Whittaker
- 3rd Massachusetts Heavy Artillery, Company G - Captain Thomas Herbert
- 3rd Massachusetts Heavy Artillery, Company H - Captain George W. Pierce
- 3rd Massachusetts Heavy Artillery, Company K - Captain Edwin Thomas
- 3rd Massachusetts Heavy Artillery, Company L - Captain Joseph M. Parsons
- 3rd Massachusetts Heavy Artillery, Company M - Captain Cornelius F. Driscoll

Third Brigade (Major George S. Worcester)

- 3rd Massachusetts Heavy Artillery, Company B - Lieutenant James E. Childs
- 3rd Massachusetts Heavy Artillery, Company C - Captain Alfred W. Brigham
- 3rd Massachusetts Heavy Artillery, Company E - Captain Leonard Gordon
- 3rd Massachusetts Heavy Artillery, Company F - Captain Joseph Austin

The troops of Hardin's division were split between the various forts around Washington DC:

- Baker
- Bayard
- Bunker Hill
- Carrell
- Davis
- De Russy
- Du Pont
- Gaines
- Greble
- Kearny
- Lincoln
- Mahan
- Mansfield
- Meigs
- Reno
- Ricketts
- Saratoga
- Simmons
- Slemmer
- Slocum
- Snyder
- Stanton
- Stevens
- Summer
- Thayer
- Totten
- Wagner

As well as a few batteries:

- Cameron
- Kemble
- Parrott
- Vermont

== Losses ==
Two officers and 39 enlisted men died from disease or accident. None were killed in action.

== See also ==
- List of Massachusetts Civil War Units
- Massachusetts in the American Civil War
