= James William Abert =

American soldier, explorer, ornithologist and topographical artist

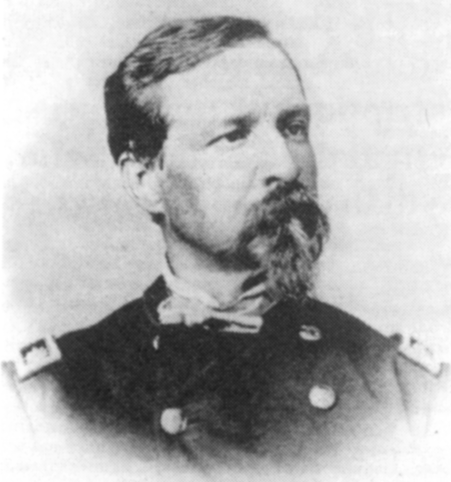
- Born: November 18, 1820; Mount Holly Township, New Jersey, U.S.
- Died: August 10, 1897 (aged 76); Newport, Kentucky, U.S.
- Burial place: Evergreen Cemetery (Southgate, Kentucky)
- Military career
- Allegiance: United States of America
- Branch: United States Army
- Service years: 1842–1864
- Rank: Major; Brevet Lieutenant Colonel
- Unit: Corps of Topographical Engineers

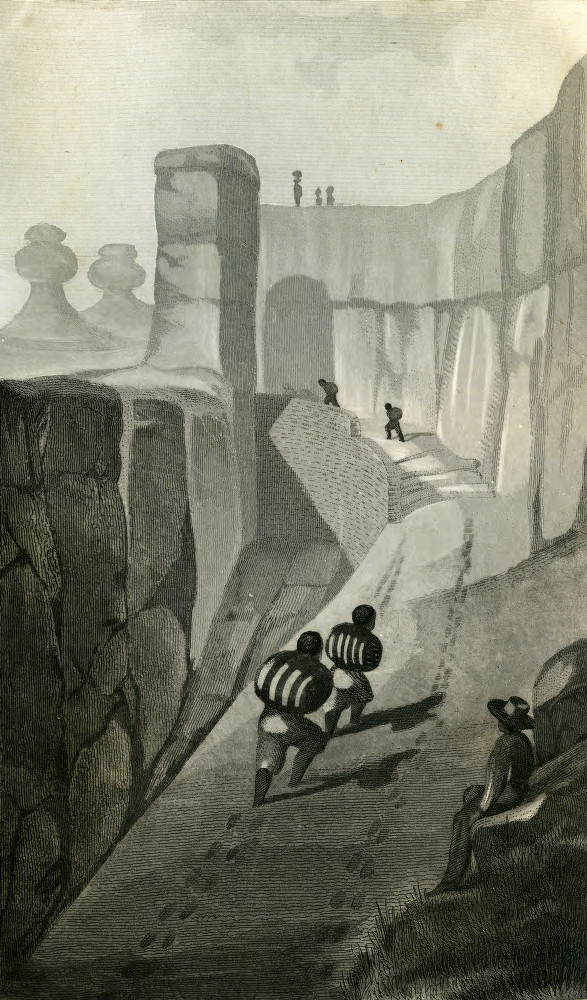
Painting of the trail to Acoma Pueblo by J.W. Abert, 1848

James William Abert (November 18, 1820 – August 10, 1897) was an American soldier, explorer, bird collector and topographical artist.

== Early life ==
Abert, the son of John James Abert, was born in Mount Holly Township, New Jersey, and graduated from West Point in 1842.

== Military career ==
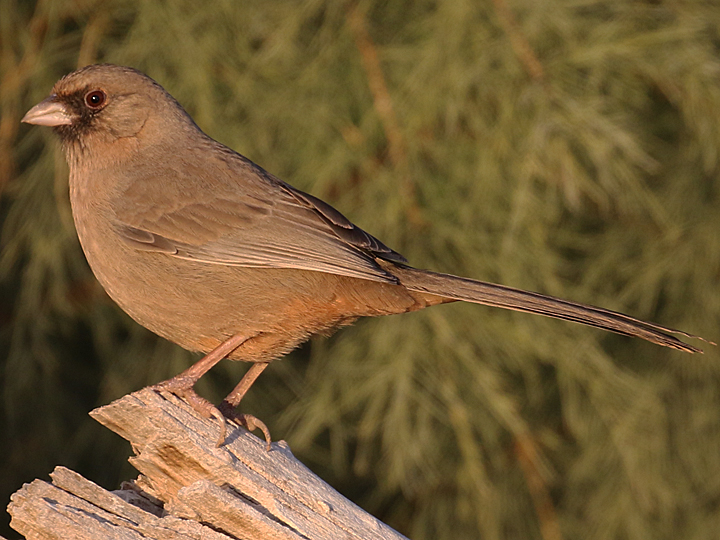
James Abert's Towhee

Abert joined the Corps of Topographical Engineers, which was headed by his father, in 1843. He joined several expeditions into the west, including John Frémont's third expedition, and illustrated these expeditions reports with his sketches. He was also put in charge of a detachment to map the Canadian River.

In 1846 he was sent west to join the army of General Kearney in the war against Mexico, returning to Fort Leavenworth in the following year. It was during this time that he acquired a new species of bird, which was named the Abert's towhee in his honour.

During the American Civil War, he served on the staffs of Robert Patterson, Nathaniel P. Banks and Quincy A. Gillmore. He was wounded during the Maryland Campaign, and retired from the Army in June 1864.

== Later life ==
After the Civil War, he became a professor of English literature, mathematics and drawing at the University of Missouri. He was also a professor of civil engineering, applied mathematics, and engineering drawing at the Missouri School of Mines and Metallurgy (1872–1877).

His original watercolors are now privately owned.
