= Lake Abert =

Highly-saline lake in Oregon, USA

- tɨbaizɨ naʔa panɨnadɨ (Northern Paiute)
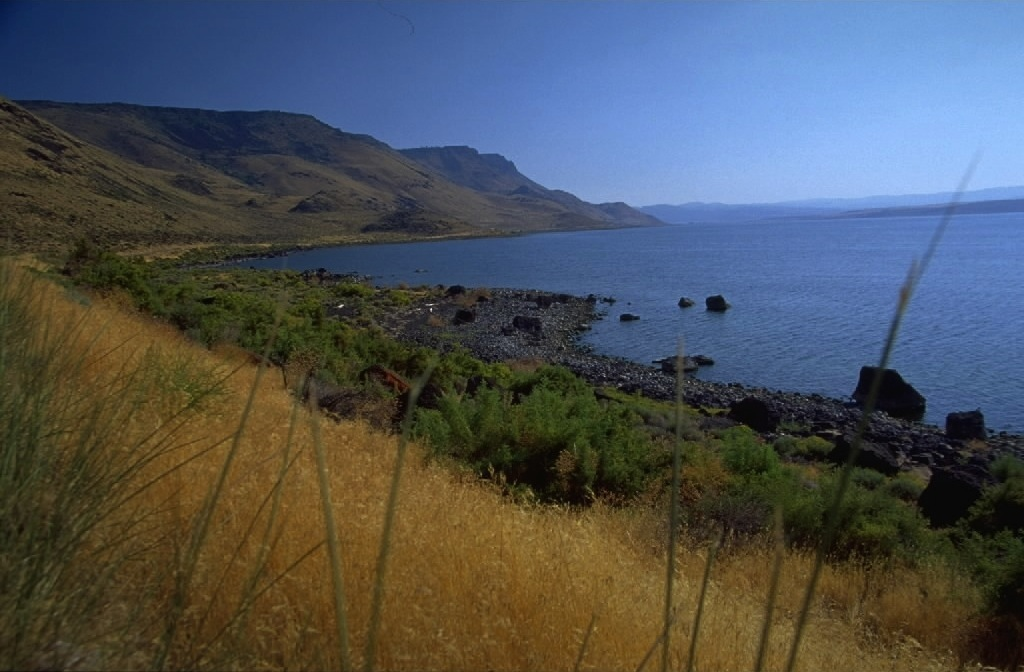
- East shore of Lake Abert

- Location within Oregon Location within the United States
- Location: Lake County, Oregon
- Coordinates: 42°38′30″N 120°13′30″W
- Type: Endorheic
- Primary inflows: Chewaucan River
- Catchment area: 820 sq mi (2,100 km^{2})
- Basin countries: United States
- Max. length: 15 mi (24 km)
- Max. width: 7 mi (11 km)
- Surface area: 57 sq mi (150 km^{2})
- Max. depth: 11 ft (3.4 m)
- Surface elevation: 4,259 ft (1,298 m)

Lake Abert (also known as Abert Lake) is a large, shallow, alkali lake in Lake County, Oregon, United States. It is approximately 15 mi (24 km) long and 7 mi (11 km) wide at its widest point. It is located 3 mi (4.8 km) northeast of the small, unincorporated community of Valley Falls, Oregon. The lake was named in honor of Colonel John James Abert by explorer John C. Fremont during his 1843 expedition into Central Oregon. No fish live in the alkaline waters of the lake; however, its dense population of brine shrimp supports a variety of shorebirds. The lake is an important stop on the bird migration route known as the Pacific flyway.

== Ancient Lake Chewaucan ==
The arid land around Lake Abert was once lush. During the Pleistocene epoch, vast areas of south-central Oregon were covered by lakes and wetlands. As the last ice age was ending, rain and runoff from melting snow filled the lowlands throughout this region of the Great Basin, creating an immense freshwater lake called Lake Chewaucan. The lake covered 461 sq mi (1,190 km^{2}) at depths of up to 375 ft (114 m).

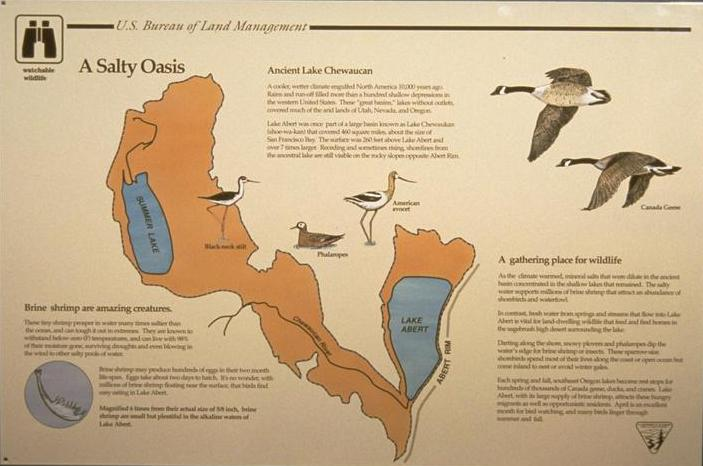
Interpretive sign describing Lake Chewaucan

Lake Chewaucan covered the Abert and Summer Lake basins for most of the late Pleistocene epoch. The last high water period occurred about 13,000 years ago. There is no archaeological evidence of human utilization of Lake Chewaucan during this time. The earliest evidence for possible human occupation of the basin comes from the Paisley Caves, which were originally excavated by Luther Cressman in the late 1930s. Cressman found inconclusive evidence that humans could have begun an occupation of the area around 11,000 years ago. Further excavations of the site by Dennis Jenkins since 2002 have yielded evidence of occupation of the area as far back as 14,300 years ago.

Lake Chewaucan began to dry up at the close of the Pleistocene epoch. As it shrank, salts and alkali were concentrated in its remaining waters, and the result was the formation of Lake Abert and Summer Lake. Today, the two lakes are 20 mi (32 km) apart and are the only remnants of Lake Chewaucan.

== Lake environment ==
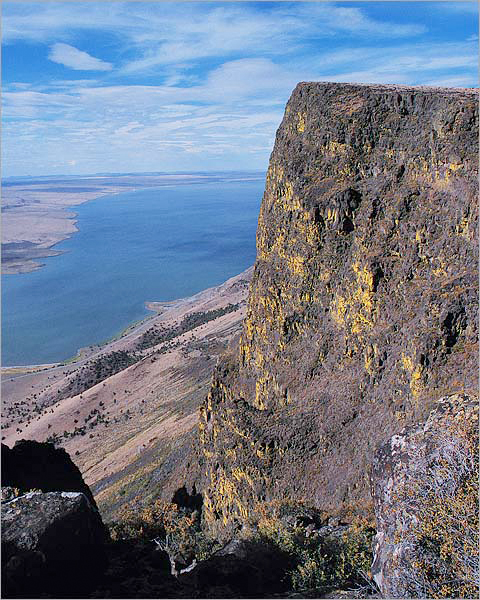
Lake Abert beyond Abert Rim

Lake Abert is an endorheic body of water that occupies the eastern arm of pluvial Lake Chewaucan basin. The lake has an elongated triangular shape. It is approximately 15 mi (24 km) long and 1 mi (1.6 km) wide at the south end of the lake, growing to 7 mi (11 km) wide at the north end. In total, the lake covers approximately 57 sq mi (150 km^{2}). Despite its size, the lake's maximum depth is only 11 ft (3.4 m). Its average depth is 7 ft (2.1 m).

The east side of Lake Abert is bounded by Abert Rim, a steep escarpment that rises over 2,500 ft (760 m) above the lake surface. The lake is bordered on the west by a long ridge called Coglan Buttes and on the north by the Coleman Hills. The lake's only year-around source of fresh water comes from the Chewaucan River, which flows into the lake from the south.

The Lake Abert drainage area covers 820 sq mi (2,100 km^{2}). The environment in the Abert drainage basin is semi-arid. Most of the precipitation in the area occurs as snowfall during the winter months, and the Chewaucan River system is fed primarily by seasonal snowmelt. The lake's only other source of fresh water is summer thundershowers that produce a small amount of runoff from Abert Rim. Because the lake has no outlet, it has developed a high concentration of sodium carbonates, common salt, and alkali in its water. Crystallized mineral crusts on rocks along the lakeshore can be several inches thick. Some mineral deposits are evident on boulders 300 ft (91 m) above the present lake surface.

== Ecology ==
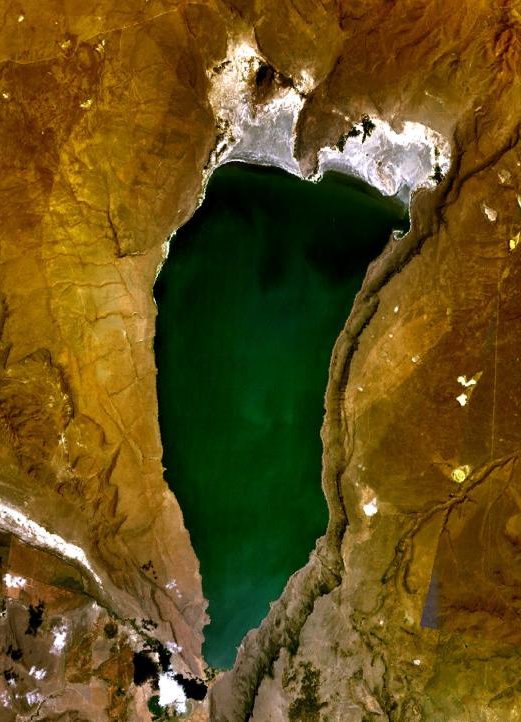
Lake Abert seen from space

Fish cannot survive in the lake because of the high salinity and alkali content; consequently, brine shrimp are abundant. The lake provides an excellent habitat for various shore birds. It is one of Oregon's few inland nesting sites for snowy plovers. The lake is also a stop on the Pacific flyway for many migrant bird species. During the annual migrations, it hosts tens of thousands of eared grebes, Wilson's phalaropes, red-necked phalaropes, American avocets, killdeer, and northern shovelers. black terns, Forster's terns, American avocet, white-faced ibis, Clark's grebes, and black-necked stilts are common during the summer months. Canada geese, snow geese, Ross' geese and many duck species are also common. Bird counts have recorded over 20,000 ducks at the lake at one time. Over 12,000 ring-billed gulls and California gulls have been counted at the lake as well. Sage grouse and burrowing owls are found near the lake, and bald eagles, ferruginous hawks, and peregrine falcons hunt in the Lake Abert area.

== History ==
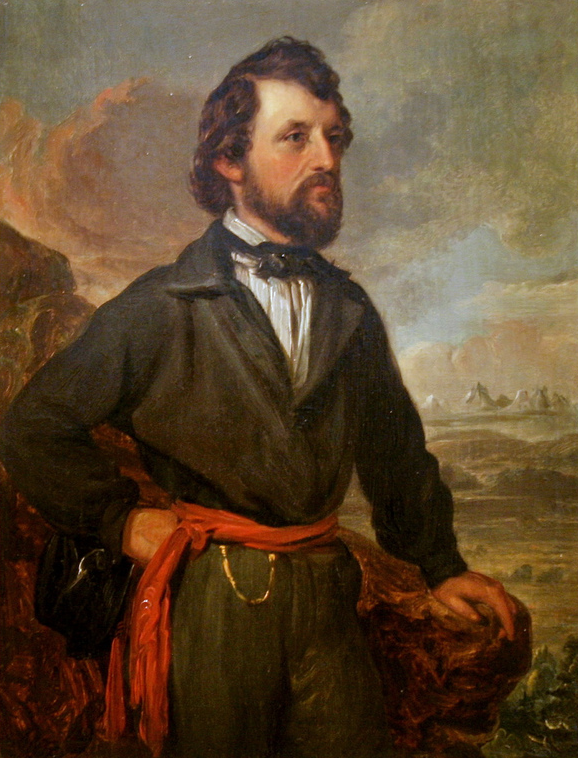
Early explorer John C. Fremont

Lake Abert was home to a series of prehistoric cultures that left behind an array of archaeological sites along the east shore of the lake. Stone house rings that are numerous in the area are not found elsewhere on the Great Basin. Prior to European settlement of the region, the Northern Paiute called the lake tɨbaizɨ naʔa panɨnadɨ, which means "bad/unpotable water."

The first written record of the lake was made by John Work, the leader of a Hudson's Bay Company fur trapping expedition. Work recorded his party's visit in his journal on 16 October 1832. In his journal, Work called it Salt Lake. Work's journal also implies that other trappers may have been to the lake before his expedition.

Lieutenant John C. Fremont named Lake Abert during his 1843 mapping expedition through central and southern Oregon. Fremont and his Army topographical team were mapping the Oregon Territory from The Dalles on the Columbia River to Sutter's Fort in the Sacramento Valley of California. Fremont named the lake in honor of Colonel John James Abert, who was chief of the Army's Corps of Topographical Engineers. On 20 December 1843, Fremont described the discovery and naming of Lake Abert as follows:

[W]e turned a point of the hill on our left, and came suddenly in sight of another and much larger lake, which, along its eastern shore, was closely bordered by the high black ridge which walled it in by a precipitous face ... Spread out over a length of 20 miles, the lake, when we first came in view, presented a handsome sheet of water; and I gave to it the name Lake Abert, in honor of the chief of the corps to which I belong....

In 1986, a wildfire burned 9,854 acres (39.88 km^{2}) along the west side of the lake. After the fire, 800 acres (3.2 km^{2}) along the shoreline were seeded with a Eurasian species, crested wheatgrass. The remaining acres were left to natural restoration.

== Human activity ==
Today, the Bureau of Land Management is responsible for Lake Abert and its surrounding land. There is one grazing allotment that borders the southwest shoreline of the lake, covering 6,886 acres (27.87 km^{2}) of Bureau of Land Management land. The area is semi-arid with bluebunch wheatgrass, cheatgrass, and big sagebrush as the primary vegetation. A 1997 study showed that the grazing practices on the allotment conformed to Federal and state standards.

Because of the lake's extreme alkalinity, there are no recreational activities that occur on the lake, although kayakers occasionally paddle on the lake. Swimming or extended contact with the lake's water would be harmful to humans. There are no developed campgrounds at Lake Abert, but the Bureau of Land Management does allow dispersed camping in the area. The only common recreational activity at Lake Abert is bird watching.

A small brine shrimp collection enterprise on Lake Abert was begun in 1979. The brine shrimp's high tolerance for salinity and ability to withstand freezing temperatures during the winter make brine shrimp the lake's only residents. While the brine shrimp harvest from the lake is relatively small, the impact of harvest has never been studied.

== Location ==
Lake Abert location in Oregon

Lake Abert is located in Lake County in south-central Oregon. The lake is 30 mi (48 km) north of Lakeview, Oregon, on U.S. Route 395. The highway runs along the east shore of the lake for approximately 18 mi (29 km). There are several interpretive signs at highway turn-offs overlooking the lake. Lake Abert is approximately 130 mi (210 km) southwest of Burns, Oregon, also on Highway 395.

== See also ==
- List of lakes in Oregon
