= Sheep Rock =

Mountain in Adams County, Idaho, United States

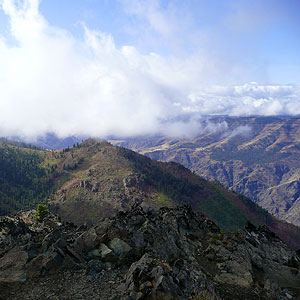

Highest point
- Elevation: 6,847 ft (2,087 m)
- Coordinates: 45.191651°N 116.67132°W

Geography
- Location: Adams County, Idaho, United States

Geology
- Mountain type: Lava flows of Columbia River Basalt Group

U.S. National Natural Landmark
- Designated: 1976

Sheep Rock is an overlook of Hells Canyon in the Payette National Forest about 45 miles northwest of Council, Idaho. It was designated a National Natural Landmark in 1976. The formation consists of two contrasting series of layers from the Columbia River Basalt Group. The layers are separated by an unconformity and provide an unobstructed view of this type of geologic phenomenon.

Sheep Rock is named for the bighorn sheep that used to inhabit the area. To the north is part of Red Ledge Mine in Deep Creek. The National Forest maintains a mile-long interpretive trail that leads to the canyon overlook halfway around the loop. Also at the trailhead is a campground with vault toilet.

Nearby is Kinney Point, an old lookout site over the canyon. It is just off the road to Sheep Rock about 1.5 miles south. The NFS has an interpretive site here.
