= Abert Lake Petroglyphs =

- U.S. National Register of Historic Places
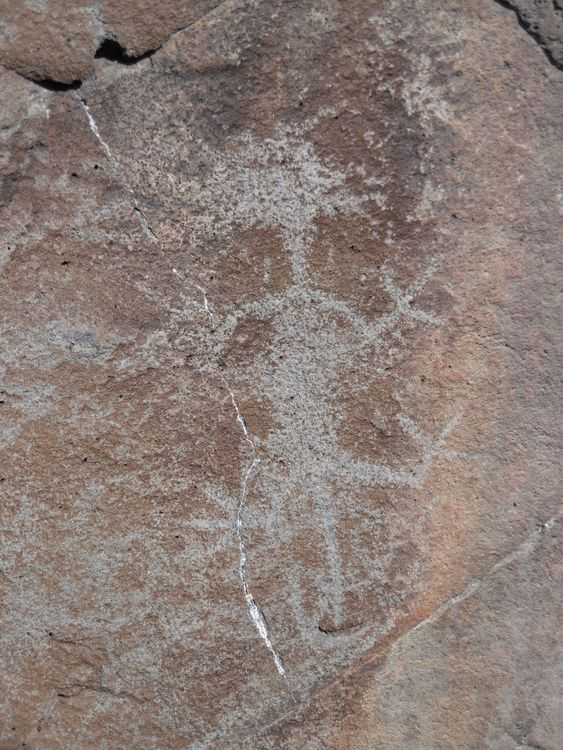
- Four-legged animal figure
- Location: Address restricted
- Nearest city: Lakeview, Oregon
- Area: Less than 1 acre (0.40 ha)
- Built: 10,000 years BP or later
- NRHP reference No.: 74002292
- Added to NRHP: November 20, 1974

The Abert Lake Petroglyphs (Smithsonian trinomial: 35LK475) are a prehistoric archaeological site in Lake County, Oregon, United States. Peoples of the Great Basin cultural tradition pecked the images onto two basaltic boulders near major game migration routes. They are believed to be connected with rituals related to hunting activities, and contribute to the larger understanding of subsistence patterns in the northern Great Basin. They were made within the last 10,000 years, but their age cannot be stated more precisely due to the difficulty of dating petroglyphs.

The site was added to the National Register of Historic Places in 1974.

== See also ==
- National Register of Historic Places listings in Lake County, Oregon
