= ABERT =

Brazilian broadcast regulator

ABERT is the Brazilian Association of Radio and Television Broadcasters (in Portuguese, Associação Brasileira das Emissoras de Rádio e Televisão). It was founded in November 1962. This Association advocate for press freedom and defends the rights and interests of Brazilian broadcasters.
