= Abert Rim =

Cliff in Lake County, Oregon, United States

- paʔa tɨkwɨnɨdɨ (Northern Paiute)
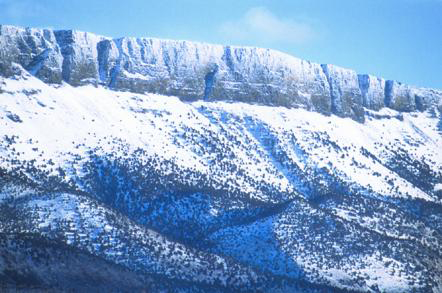
- Abert Rim in the winter

Highest point
- Elevation: 7,548 ft (2,301 m)
- Prominence: 2,500 ft (760 m)
- Coordinates: 42°39′N 120°11′W

Naming
- Etymology: "high rim rock" in Northern Paiute

Geography
- Location within Oregon
- Location: Lake County, Oregon, United States

Geology
- Mountain type: Fault-block escarpment

Abert Rim (Northern Paiute: paʔa tɨkwɨnɨdɨ) in Lake County, Oregon is one of the highest fault scarps in the United States. It rises 2,490 feet (760 m) above the valley floor, finishing with an 820-foot (250 m) sheer-sided basalt cap. It was formed during the Miocene epoch. At that time basaltic flood lavas covered much of eastern Oregon. In subsequent faulting, great blocks were tilted and Abert Rim is at the western end of one of these blocks, while Lake Abert lies on top of another. Stretching more than 30 miles (48 km) from Lakeview north to Alkali Lake, Abert Rim is also the longest exposed fault scarp in North America.

Bighorn sheep were transplanted to the rim in 1975 and 1977 from nearby Hart Mountain, and are often spotted from the Abert Rim geologic point of interest sign located along Highway 395. Raptors, such as the Ferruginous Hawk, are also common in the area.

The Chewaucan River enters Lake Abert from the south, however it has no outlet. The lake level varies depending on rainfall and it nearly completely dried up 140 years ago. It is one of the Great Basin lakes.

Prior to European settlement of the region, the Northern Paiute called the fault scarp paʔa tɨkwɨnɨdɨ, which means "high rim rock." The escarpment and lake were first mapped on December 20, 1843, by John C. Frémont, who named it after Colonel John James Abert, his commanding officer.

The southern section of Abert Rim is a popular spot for paragliding and hang gliding because of the frequent thermals created by warm valley air rising up against the cliffs. The area was formerly considered by many to be the hang gliding capital of the West until paragliding superseded it in popularity. National free flight festivals are held each year in late June and during the Fourth of July.

== See also ==
- Burma Rim
- Basin and Range Province
- Geology of the Pacific Northwest
