= John James Abert =

American soldier (1788–1863)

Colonel John J. Abert
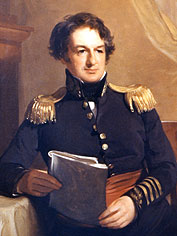
- Portrait of Colonel John J. Abert
- Born: September 17, 1788; Shepherdstown, Virginia (now West Virginia)
- Died: January 27, 1863 (aged 74); Washington, District of Columbia, U.S.
- Burial place: Rock Creek Cemetery; Washington, D.C., U.S.
- Education: West Point
- Spouse: Ellen Matlack Stretch
- Military career
- Allegiance: United States
- Branch: United States Army
- Service years: 1814–1861
- Rank: Colonel
- Commands: Corps of Topographical Engineers

John James Abert (17 September 1788 – 27 January 1863) was an American soldier. He headed the Corps of Topographical Engineers for 32 years, during which time he organized the mapping of the American West.

Abert was born in Shepherdstown, Virginia (now West Virginia; also disputed to be Frederick, Maryland) to John Abert and Margarita Meng, his father being said to have emigrated to the States as a soldier with Jean-Baptiste Donatien de Vimeur, comte de Rochambeau in 1780. He graduated from West Point in 1811, but declined a commission to practice law. After leaving West Point, he married Ellen Matlack Stretch in January 1812. He enlisted in the D.C. Militia during the War of 1812, and rejoined the army as a topographical engineer with the rank of brevet Major in October 1814. Abert volunteered as a private in the District of Columbia Militia for the defense of Washington in 1814, and was brevetted Major, Staff Topographical Engineer, for gallantry at the Battle of Bladensburg, Maryland, August 24, 1814.

His son, James William Abert, who also became a member of the corps, was born in 1820. In March 1829, John Abert was appointed to the leadership of the corps, and promoted to colonel in July 1838. Officers working under him were responsible for the exploration and mapping of the lands west of the Mississippi River. He was elected a member of the American Philosophical Society in 1832 and an Associate Fellow of the American Academy of Arts and Sciences in 1845.

In 1818, the US War Department created the Topographic Bureau as part of the Corps of Engineers, under the command of Major Isaac Roberdeau. The Topographic Bureau was assigned six men and was to collect and store maps and topographical reports. When Roberdeau died in 1829, Abert became the head of the Bureau. He wanted to be free from the oversight of the United States Army Corps of Engineers and establish a separate Topographic Corps. in 1831 Abert was able to persuade Congress to remove the topographic engineers from the Corps of Engineers, and place them directly under the United States Secretary of War. In 1838, Abert was appointed the command of the Corps of Topographical Engineers, which position he would hold for 23 years. The Corps of Topographical Engineers had grown by then to thirty-six officers, including six majors, four captains by brevet, six civil engineers and twenty subalterns of the line. Abert recruited the best soldier-scientists he could find. These included John C. Frémont, William H. Emory and Andrew A. Humphreys.

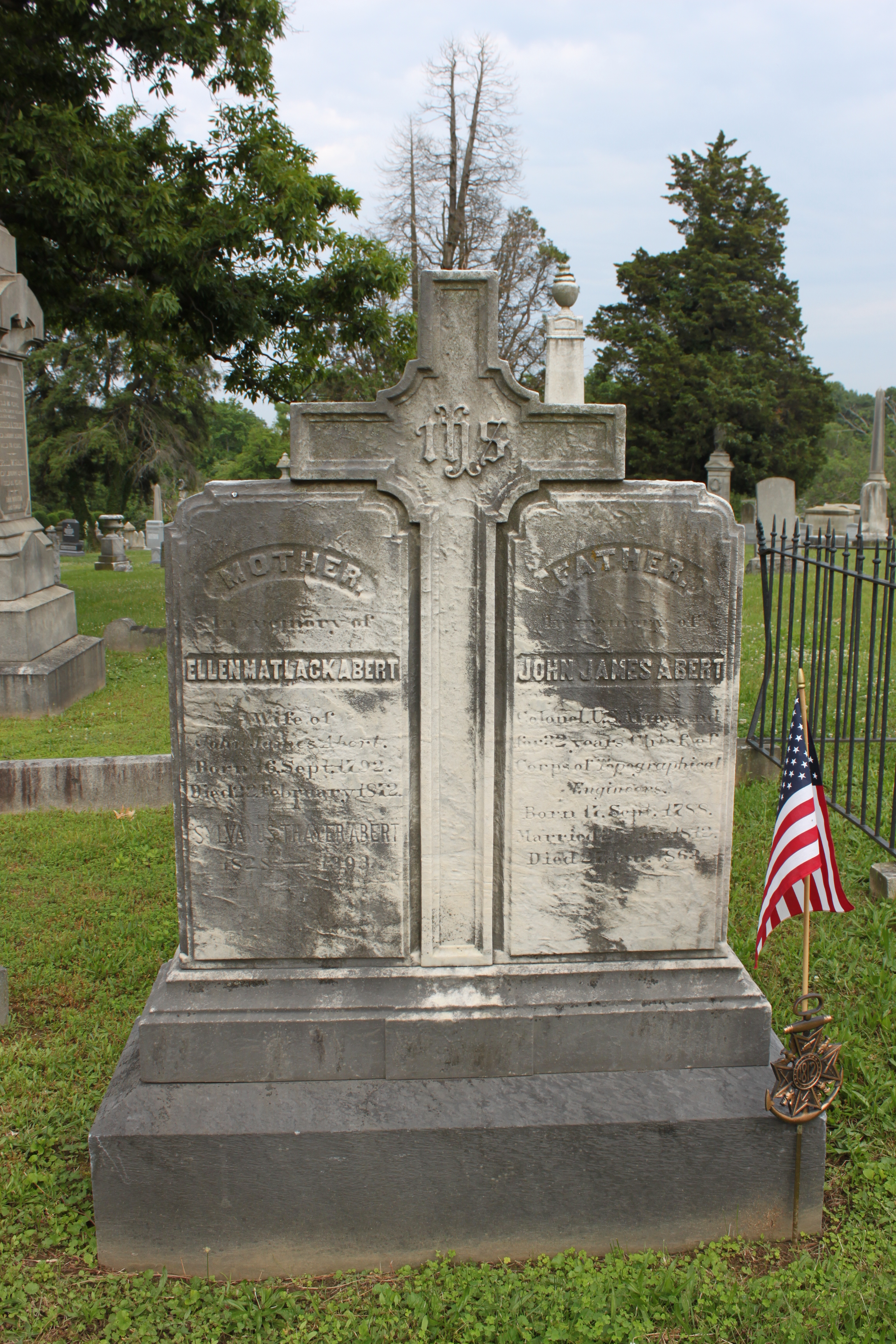
Grave of Abert at Rock Creek Cemetery

Abert was a member of a number of legal, geographical and scientific societies. He was also a member of the Geographical Society of Paris, the Société de Géographie. He retired from the Army in September 1861. Abert died in Washington, D.C., and was buried in Rock Creek Cemetery.

When he died, the US War Department wrote about Abert's accomplishments with the Corps of Topographical Engineers: "The Army and the country will not need to be reminded of the vast interest and value attached to the operations of this Corps since its organization. The geographical and other information concerning this continent which its officers have collected and published has challenged the admiration of the scientific world, while the practical benefit of their labors has been felt in nearly every State and every Territory; the whole forming a proud monument to him who was its founder. As a citizen and a man, Colonel Abert was remarkable for the steadfastness of his friendships, for his candor and unostentatious hospitality. Equally unostentatious, but no less sincere, was the simple piety which supported his declining years, and left behind an example which the proudest soldier would not be ashamed to follow."

Abert is the namesake of Lake Albert in South Dakota. Captain John C. Fremont named Lake Abert and Abert Rim in his honor when his 1843 expedition passed through southern Oregon. The Abert's squirrel was also named after him.

== Children ==
Abert's children include:

- James William Abert (1820–1897) soldier, explorer, ornithologist and topographical artist
- Silvanus Thayer Abert (1828–1903), civil engineer
- William Stretch Abert (1836–1867), soldier
