= List of petroglyphs in the United States =

This is a list of petroglyphs in the United States.

== States ==
Alabama

Painted Bluff

=== Alaska ===
- Petroglyph Beach State Historic Park

=== Arizona ===
- Black Mountain (Pima County, Arizona)
- Cocoraque Butte Archaeological District
- Deer Valley Petroglyph Preserve
- Honanki
- Huerfano Butte (Arizona)
- Keyhole Sink
- Newspaper Rock Petroglyphs Archeological District
- Northern Avenue Petroglyph Site
- Painted Rock Petroglyph Site
- Palatki Heritage Site
- Petrified Forest National Park
- Saguaro National Park
- Tumamoc Hill
- Tutuveni
- V Bar V Heritage Site
- White Tank Mountain Regional Park

=== California ===
- Aiken's Wash
- Barker Dam (California)
- Big and Little Petroglyph Canyons
- Black Mountain Rock Art District
- Chalfant Petroglyph Site
- Chumash Indian Museum
- Coso Rock Art District
- Hemet Maze Stone
- Maidu Museum and Historic Site
- Meadow Lake Petroglyphs
- Painted Rock (San Luis Obispo County, California)
- Petroglyph Point Archeological Site
- Ring Mountain (California)
- Yellow Jacket Petroglyphs

=== Florida ===
- Crystal River Archaeological State Park

=== Georgia ===
- Track Rock

=== Illinois ===
- Marshall Site (Chillicothe, Illinois)
- Millstone Bluff
- Piney Creek Ravine State Natural Area
- Piney Creek Site
  - Piney Creek South Site
  - Piney Creek West Site
- Tegtmeyer Site

=== Kentucky ===
- Indian Head Rock
- Jeffry Cliff Petroglyphs (15HA114)
- Mammoth Cave National Park
- Red Bird River Petroglyphs

=== Massachusetts ===
- Dighton Rock

=== Michigan ===
- Sanilac Petroglyphs Historic State Park

=== Minnesota ===
- American Indian Rock Art in Minnesota MPS
- Hegman Lake Pictograph
- Jeffers Petroglyphs
- Pipestone National Monument

=== Missouri ===
- Holliday Petroglyphs
- Thousand Hills State Park
- Washington State Park

=== Maine ===
- Maine Archaeological Survey site 21.26

=== Montana ===
- Deer Medicine Rocks
- Petroglyph Canyon
- Pictograph Cave (Billings, Montana)

=== Nebraska ===
- Indian Cave State Park

=== Nevada ===
- Brownstone Canyon Archaeological District
- Grapevine Canyon Petroglyphs
- Hidden Cave
- Sloan Canyon National Conservation Area
- Tim Springs Petroglyphs
- Valley of Fire State Park
- Winnemucca Lake

=== New Mexico ===
- Crow Canyon Archaeological District
- El Morro National Monument
- Petroglyph National Monument
- Rio Grande Gorge
- Three Rivers Petroglyph Site

=== North Carolina ===
- Judaculla Rock

=== North Dakota ===
- Medicine Rock State Historic Site
- Writing Rock State Historical Site

=== Ohio ===
- Barnesville Petroglyph
- Independence Slab
- Inscription Rock (Kelleys Island, Ohio)
- Leo Petroglyph
- Turkey Foot Rock

=== Oregon ===
- Abert Lake Petroglyphs
- East Lake Abert Archeological District
- Greaser Petroglyph Site
- Picture Rock Pass Petroglyphs Site

=== Pennsylvania ===
- Big and Little Indian Rock Petroglyphs
- Francis Farm Petroglyphs
- Indian God Rock
- Sugar Grove Petroglyphs

=== South Carolina ===
- South Carolina Petroglyph Site

=== Tennessee ===
- Dunbar Cave State Park
- Harpeth River State Park

=== Utah ===
- Barrier Canyon Style
- Buckhorn Draw Pictograph Panel
- Courthouse Wash Pictographs
- Fremont Indian State Park
- Horseshoe Canyon (Emery and Wayne counties, Utah)
- Millsite Rock Art
- Newspaper Rock State Historic Monument
- Ninemile Canyon (Utah)
- Parowan Gap
- Quail rock art panel
- Rochester Rock Art Panel
- White Canyon (San Juan County, Utah)

=== Vermont ===
- Bellows Falls Petroglyph Site

=== Washington ===
- Duwamish Head petroglyphs
- Elliot Bay Petroglyphs
- Ginkgo Petrified Forest State Park
- Haleets
- Lake Lenore Caves State Park
- Yakima Indian Painted Rocks

=== West Virginia ===
- Hamilton Farm Petroglyphs
- Indian Cave Petroglyphs (West Virginia)
- Wildcat Branch Petroglyphs

=== Wisconsin ===
- Roche-a-Cri Petroglyphs

=== Wyoming ===
- Arch Creek Petroglyphs
- Calpet Rockshelter (48SU354)
- Castle Gardens
- Gateway (48LN348)
- La Barge Bluffs Petroglyphs
- Legend Rock
- Medicine Lodge State Archeological Site
- Tolar Petroglyph Site
- White Mountain
- Wold Rock Art District

== Territories ==
- Cueva Lucero, Puerto Rico
- Reef Bay Trail petroglyphs, U.S. Virgin Islands
