= National Register of Historic Places listings in Randolph County, Illinois =

Location of Randolph County in Illinois

This is a list of the National Register of Historic Places listings in Randolph County, Illinois.

This is intended to be a complete list of the properties and districts on the National Register of Historic Places in Randolph County, Illinois, United States. Latitude and longitude coordinates are provided for many National Register properties and districts; these locations may be seen together in a map.

There are 18 properties and districts listed on the National Register in the county, including 3 National Historic Landmarks.

This National Park Service list is complete through NPS recent listings posted July 31, 2026.

== Current listings ==
	Name on the Register	Image	Date listed	Location	City or town	Description
1	Charter Oak Schoolhouse	Charter Oak Schoolhouse	October 11, 1978 (#78001181)	West of Schuline; 38°05′21″N 89°47′39″W	Schuline	
2	Creole House	Creole House	April 3, 1973 (#73000717)	Market St. 38°05′08″N 90°05′50″W	Prairie du Rocher	
3	Fort de Chartres	Fort de Chartres	October 15, 1966 (#66000329)	Terminus of Illinois Route 155, west of Prairie du Rocher; 38°05′04″N 90°09′28″W	Prairie du Rocher	
4	French Colonial Historic District	French Colonial Historic District	April 3, 1974 (#74000772)	From Fort Chartres State Park to Kaskaskia Island; 38°04′48″N 90°07′48″W	Prairie du Rocher	Extends into Monroe County
5	Kolmer Site	Kolmer Site	May 1, 1974 (#74000773)	Levee Rd., west of Fort Chartres State Park; 38°05′30″N 90°10′51″W	Prairie du Rocher	
6	Mary's River Covered Bridge	Mary's River Covered Bridge	December 31, 1974 (#74000771)	About 4 miles northeast of Chester on Illinois Route 150; 37°56′54″N 89°45′57″W	Chester	
7	Pierre Menard House	Pierre Menard House	April 15, 1970 (#70000245)	Fort Kaskaskia State Park; 37°57′41″N 89°54′24″W	Ellis Grove	
8	Modoc Rock Shelter	Modoc Rock Shelter	October 15, 1966 (#66000328)	Northeastern side of County Road 7 southeast of Roscow Hollow Rd. 38°03′46″N 90°03′50″W	Modoc	
9	Old Fire Station	Old Fire Station	June 15, 2018 (#100002571)	822 Swanwick; 37°54′41″N 89°49′31″W	Chester	
10	Piney Creek Site	Piney Creek Site	May 31, 2001 (#01000601)	North of Piney Creek in Piney Creek Ravine Nature Preserve; 37°53′49″N 89°38′10″W	Campbell Hill	
11	Piney Creek South Site	Piney Creek South Site	May 31, 2001 (#01000602)	South of Piney Creek in Piney Creek Ravine Nature Preserve; 37°53′47″N 89°38′09″W	Campbell Hill	
12	Piney Creek West Site	Piney Creek West Site	May 31, 2001 (#01000600)	North of Piney Creek in Piney Creek Ravine Nature Preserve; 37°53′49″N 89°38′14″W	Campbell Hill	
13	Red Bud Historic District	Red Bud Historic District	December 29, 1979 (#79000865)	Irregular pattern along Main and Market Sts. 38°12′33″N 89°59′37″W	Red Bud	
14	Shiloh College	Shiloh College	November 15, 2005 (#05001251)	13043 Walnut St. 37°55′36″N 89°37′12″W	Shiloh Hill	
15	Sparta Historic District	Sparta Historic District	June 3, 1982 (#82002595)	S. St. Louis, W. 3rd, and S. James Sts. 38°07′11″N 89°42′15″W	Sparta	
16	Tegtmeyer Site	Tegtmeyer Site	May 31, 2001 (#01000599)	North of Piney Creek in Piney Creek Ravine Nature Preserve; 37°53′51″N 89°38′16″W	Campbell Hill	
17	Christian F. Weinrich House	Christian F. Weinrich House	June 20, 2018 (#100002572)	217 Opdyke St. 37°54′39″N 89°49′18″W	Chester	
18	Frederick Weistar House	Frederick Weistar House	June 15, 2018 (#100002573)	515 Chestnut St. 37°54′15″N 89°49′44″W	Chester	Misspelled Frederick Weister House in its listing

== See also ==
- List of National Historic Landmarks in Illinois
- National Register of Historic Places listings in Illinois
