= Old Fire Station =

Old Fire Station may refer to:

- Old Fire Station Theatre in Oxford, also known as the Old Fire Station, England, United Kingdom
- Old Fire Station, Kennington, a Grade II listed building, England, United Kingdom
- Old Fire Station (Chester, Illinois), listed on the National Register of Historic Places, United States
