= Sparta Historic District =

Sparta Historic District may refer to:

- Sparta Historic District (Sparta, Georgia), listed on the National Register of Historic Places in Hancock County, Georgia
- Sparta Historic District (Sparta, Illinois), listed on the National Register of Historic Places in Randolph County, Illinois
- Sparta Historic District, a local historic district of Sparta, Ossining, New York
