= Zorro Ranch =

Ranch formerly owned by Jeffrey Epstein

Rancho de San Rafael
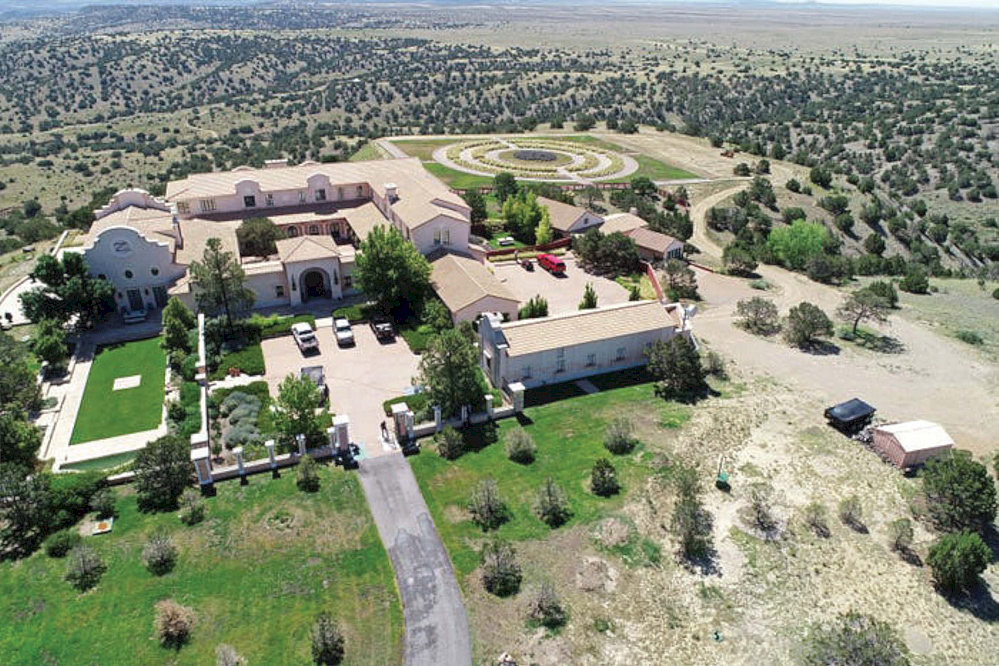
- An aerial view of the ranch's main buildings from the northwest

- Location within the United States
- Town/City: 340 Rancho San Rafael; Santa Fe County
- State: New Mexico
- Country: United States
- Coordinates: 35°16′02″N 105°58′11″W
- Established: 1993 (Jeffrey Epstein and estate of Jeffrey Epstein ownership, other owners previously)
- Owner: Bruce King (formerly); Jeffrey Epstein (formerly); Colin, Mary Catherine, and Don Huffines (currently)
- Area: 7,622 acres (31 km^{2})
- Status: Redevelopment as a Christian retreat

Zorro Ranch, renamed Rancho de San Rafael, is a large private property located near Stanley, New Mexico, United States, about 30 mi (48 km) south of Santa Fe. It was owned by the financier and child sex offender Jeffrey Epstein from 1993 until his death in 2019.

In 1999, Epstein built a mansion on the property. The sprawling compound eventually included a private airstrip, a helicopter pad, and an airplane hangar. The estate of Jeffrey Epstein sold off the property in 2023 to Dallas real estate magnate and politician Don Huffines.

== Overview ==
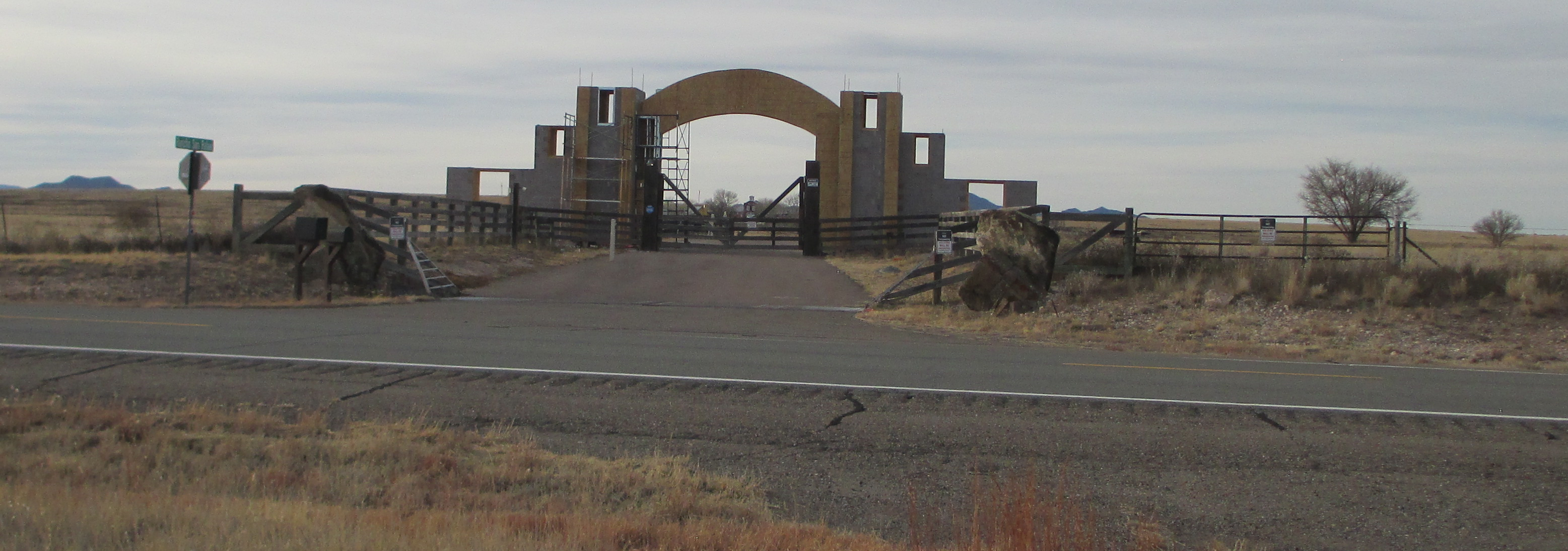
The entrance to Rancho de San Rafael in December 2025

=== Geology ===
The ranch is situated in the high desert of central New Mexico north of the Estancia Basin and encompasses over 7,600 acres (31 km^{2}) of land, or about 0.63% of the area of Santa Fe County. The north edge of the property approximately follows a Tertiary period magmatic dike called El Creston (not to be confused with the ridge of the same name passing through Sapello and La Cueva in Mora County). The ranch itself straddles a cliff demarcating the boundary between the Mancos Shale to the north and Quaternary period alluvial deposits of the Santa Fe Group to the south.

=== Geography ===
North of the Zorro Ranch is the Cerro Pelon Ranch, where various films have been shot. The Cerro Pelon Ranch has been owned by the fashion designer Tom Ford since 2001. The ranch is surrounded by land owned by the family of the former New Mexico governor Bruce King and the government of New Mexico. Members of the King family also appear in Epstein's “Little Black Book” of contacts, and Epstein donated money to the son of Bruce King, former Attorney General of New Mexico Gary King.

=== Architecture ===
The ranch includes a large three-story main residence, a pool, a firehouse, offices, a log cabin and guest houses. The main house or mansion (current address 340 Rancho San Rafael) was built in hacienda style and completed in 1999. It was designed to accommodate large gatherings and at 28,636 square feet (2,660 m^{2}) has often been described as 'sprawling' and is likely among the largest private residences in the state. Stewart Udall criticized the mansion as a 'pompous trophy home' when it was in the planning stage.

The ranch's grounds an antique railroad car and train tracks, remnants of the "Frijoles Line" of the New Mexico Central Railroad. A helipad had been landscaped as a labyrinth garden and is now brownfield again. Epstein expanded the property in 2001 and again in 2004.

Epstein built a private airstrip and hangar that allowed discreet access to the residence.

== History ==
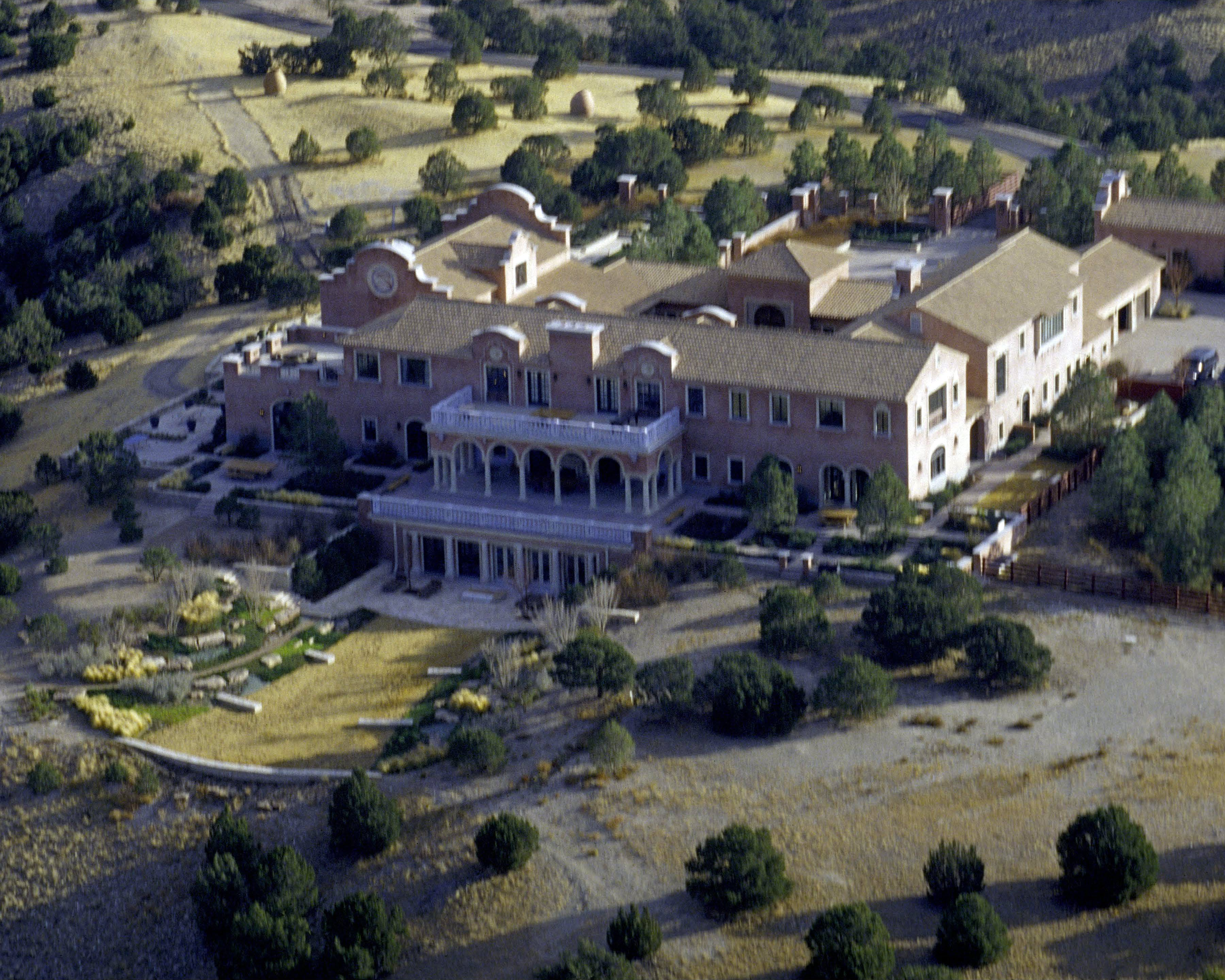
Aerial backyard view of the mansion from the east

The land within the ranch has a long history, with records dating back to the Spanish colonial era, when it was part of a larger land grant. Over the centuries, the property changed hands multiple times and was used primarily for ranching and agricultural purposes.

=== Epstein's ownership ===
==== 1993–2000 ====
External videos
- 2019 interview of Jeffrey Epstein by Steve Bannon
- in Epstein Files Transparency Act archive
- https://justice.gov/epstein/files/DataSet%2010/EFTA01600824.mov

Jeffrey Epstein purchased Zorro Ranch in 1993, reportedly for around $12 million, from the former New Mexico Governor Bruce King. Epstein built a huge mansion at the ranch, with a living room the size of an average American home.

He stated in a 2019 interview conducted by Steve Bannon that he became interested in New Mexico as an investor after 1990, when he learned that many scientists who had previously worked at Los Alamos National Laboratory were working at private spin-off firms doing pure and applied research, such as the Santa Fe Institute. Such companies are sometimes collectively known as the 'info mesa' on the pattern of Silicon Valley.

Epstein controlled the property through a shell company called Zorro Trust, later renamed Cypress, Inc. The 10,000 acres included 1,200 acres leased from the state (Land Commission of New Mexico).

Icons used by Jeffrey Epstein to represent Zorro Ranch

Zorro Ranch brand

Zorro Ranch logo

Epstein registered a brand for the ranch consisting of a conjoined J and E.

The ranch was allegedly used as a location for sexual abuse and sex trafficking of minors. Annie Farmer, the sister of Marie Farmer, alleged that in 1996 that she had been sexually abused by Epstein and his accomplice Ghislaine Maxwell at the ranch, In the Ghislaine Maxwell trial, a judge ruled that Annie's allegations about Epstein and Maxwell did not constitute "illegal sexual activity".

In 2019, author Jaron Lanier told The New York Times that he had once spoken to a scientist who said that Epstein wanted to "seed the human race with his DNA by impregnating women at his New Mexico ranch". Lanier could not remember the name of the scientist who allegedly told him this, but claimed she had identified herself as working at NASA.

==== 2000–2019 ====
At the ranch, Epstein received prominent guests. According to one of Epstein's housekeepers, Andrew Mountbatten-Windsor, at the time known as Prince Andrew, Duke of York, visited the ranch in 2001 for three days. Former congressman and New Mexico governor Bill Richardson was also among the visitors. Celebrity visitors included Woody Allen and Soon-Yi Previn.

Epstein had petroglyphs moved for décor at the ranch and had placed an old caboose on state land he was leasing, near the petroglyph-rich geological formation called El Crestón (list of petroglyphs in New Mexico). The chair of the All Pueblo Council of Governors, Joey Sanchez, said in a statement: "The destruction and removal of petroglyphs and cultural sites at Zorro Ranch is deeply troubling, yet not surprising considering what has come to light about Jeffrey Epstein. These sites hold profound significance as part of the living history of the Pueblos across the Southwest, reflecting the enduring connection between our people and the land." Sanchez further complained: "For our communities, the crisis of missing and murdered Indigenous women underscores the critical need to safeguard people from predators like this."

In late August 2018, trespassers cut a perimeter fence, broke into several buildings, and stole a firearm safe believed to contain 30-40 guns.

=== Aftermath and new ownership ===
In 2019, the Federal Bureau of Investigation (FBI) acquired search warrants for other properties owned by Epstein, namely for his Manhattan mansion Herbert N. Straus House and his private island in the United States Virgin Islands Little Saint James, but there was never an FBI raid on the ranch.

In the years following Epstein's death, the ranch had remained largely unused until it was sold to San Rafael Ranch LLC for an undisclosed sum rumored to be far lower than the asking price in 2023. The ranch was purchased in 2023 by the family of Texas businessman and politician Don Huffines through an LLC with the owners' names kept secret. The name of the ranch was changed to Rancho de San Rafael, and a spokesperson for Huffines relayed that it would be used as a Christian retreat. The area immediately outside the main gates has been decorated by visitors as a descanso, a memorial to those victimized by Epstein and Maxwell.

In April 2026, 3 YouTubers trespassed into the property with the intent of filming a video, and alleged that they were shot at by the property manager.

== 2026 investigation ==
In late 2025, New Mexico state legislators pushed for an inquiry into the Zorro Ranch.

Concerns were prompted by an anonymous email sent to radio host Eddy Aragon in 2019, who forwarded it to the FBI shortly after receiving it. The anonymous sender claimed to be a former ranch employee, and demanded a payment of one Bitcoin (at the time worth about $8,000) in return for videos of Epstein abusing girls, and the location of two girls they claimed were buried at the ranch. It is unclear what the FBI determined about the tip. According to Reuters, many of the files from the Epstein investigation "contain untrue and sensationalist claims," including anonymous allegations that were not corroborated, or were determined false.

In February 2026, the New Mexico Legislature's House passed a bill to create a survivors' truth commission relating to the ranch. That summer the commission issued fourteen subpoenas to the FBI, the Santa Fe County Sheriff’s Office, the New Mexico Governor’s Office, the Department of Public Safety, the State Land Office and the Santa Fe Institute.

In March 2026, New Mexico officials began a search of the ranch, with cooperation of the Huffines family. Investigators are using "vehicles, drones, and cadaver canines" to search the property.

Raúl Torrez, New Mexico Attorney General, has Touhy subpoenad United States Department of Justice officials including Todd Blanche to access details of redacted documents in the Epstein files related to Zorro Ranch.
