= Brick City (disambiguation) =

Brick City is a nickname for Newark, New Jersey

Brick City may also refer to:

- Brick City (band), contestants in The X Factor
- Brick City (TV series), American documentary series
- "Brick City club", another name for the musical style known as Jersey club
- Brick City, a local nickname for the Rochester Institute of Technology
- Itanagar (lit. 'Brick City'), capital city of Arunachal Pradesh, India

== See also ==
- Bricktown (disambiguation)
