= New Bourbon Regional Port Authority =

- Type: Regional port authority
- Headquarters: Ste. Genevieve County, Missouri, United States
- Location: Ste. Genevieve County, Missouri
- Website: missouriports.org/missouris-ports/new-bourbon/

The New Bourbon Regional Port Authority is a river port located in Ste. Genevieve County, Missouri, along the Mississippi River. It is one of several port authorities in Missouri that facilitates the transportation of goods via the river, providing an essential service to the local economy and the broader region. The port's location allows it to serve as a strategic point for shipping agricultural products, raw materials, and other commodities to both domestic and international markets.

Situated on the west bank of the Mississippi River in eastern Missouri, the port is about 60 miles (97 km) south of St. Louis. This location provides easy access to major highways, including Interstate 55, which connects to the broader interstate system, enhancing the port's logistical capabilities.

The port received major dock upgrades in 2020.

== Ferry ==
Modoc Ferry provides access across the Mississippi River between Ste. Genevieve, Missouri, and Modoc, Illinois. Operated by the New Bourbon Regional Port Authority, the ferry runs year-round, offering a convenient route for local farmers, truckers, and tourists. It also serves as an important connection for cyclists traveling along the Great River Road and the Mississippi River Bicycle Trail.
