= 2021 Albuquerque mayoral election =

- November 2, 2021
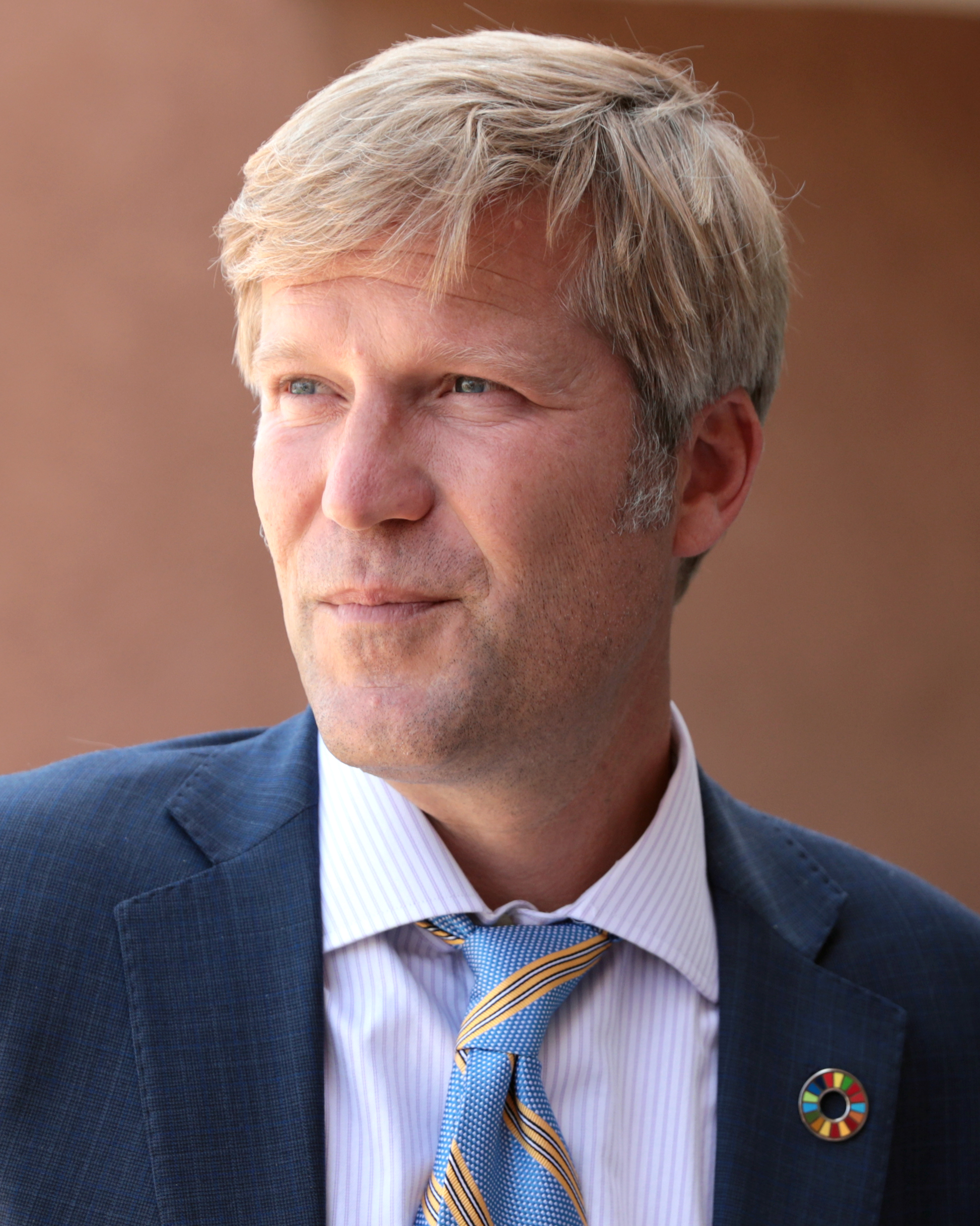

Candidate	Tim Keller	Manny Gonzalez	Eddy Aragon
Popular vote	67,163	30,576	21,989
Percentage	56.08%	25.53%	18.36%
Mayor before election
Tim Keller
Democratic
Elected Mayor
Tim Keller
Democratic

The 2021 Albuquerque mayoral election was held on November 2, 2021, to elect the mayor of Albuquerque, New Mexico. The election was nonpartisan; candidates' party affiliations did not appear on the ballot.

Incumbent mayor Tim Keller won re-election to a second term by earning a majority of the vote in the primary election, negating the need for a runoff.

== Candidates ==
=== Declared ===
- Eddy Aragon (Republican), talk radio host
- Manny Gonzales (Democratic), sheriff of Bernalillo County
- Tim Keller (Democratic), incumbent mayor

=== Disqualified ===
- Patrick Sais (Republican), retired school bus driver

=== Withdrew ===
- Nicholas Bevins (Democratic), political activist and Bernie Sanders 2020 campaign organizer

== Endorsements ==
Nicholas Bevins (withdrawn)

Organizations

- PRESS New Mexico
Tim Keller

Organizations

- Albuquerque Journal
- Sierra Club Rio Grande Chapter
- Planned Parenthood

== Polling ==
Poll source	Date(s) administered	Sample size (Note: Key: A – all adults RV – registered voters LV – likely voters V – unclear)	Margin of error	Eddy Aragon	Manny Gonzales	Tim Keller	Undecided
Research & Polling Inc.	October 15–21, 2021	536 (LV)	± 4.3%	13%	20%	53%	12%
SurveyUSA	October 12–18, 2021	576 (LV)	± 4.9%	18%	22%	41%	18%
Public Policy Polling (D)	September 23–24, 2021	798 (LV)	± 3.5%	11%	21%	47%	21%

== Results ==
2021 Albuquerque mayoral election
Party	Candidate	Votes	%
Nonpartisan	Tim Keller (inc.)	67,163	56.08%
Nonpartisan	Manny Gonzalez	30,576	25.53%
Nonpartisan	Eddy Aragon	21,989	18.36%
Write-in		34	0.03%
Total votes		119,762	100.00%
