= Tegtmeyer Site =

Archaeological site in Illinois, United States

- U.S. National Register of Historic Places
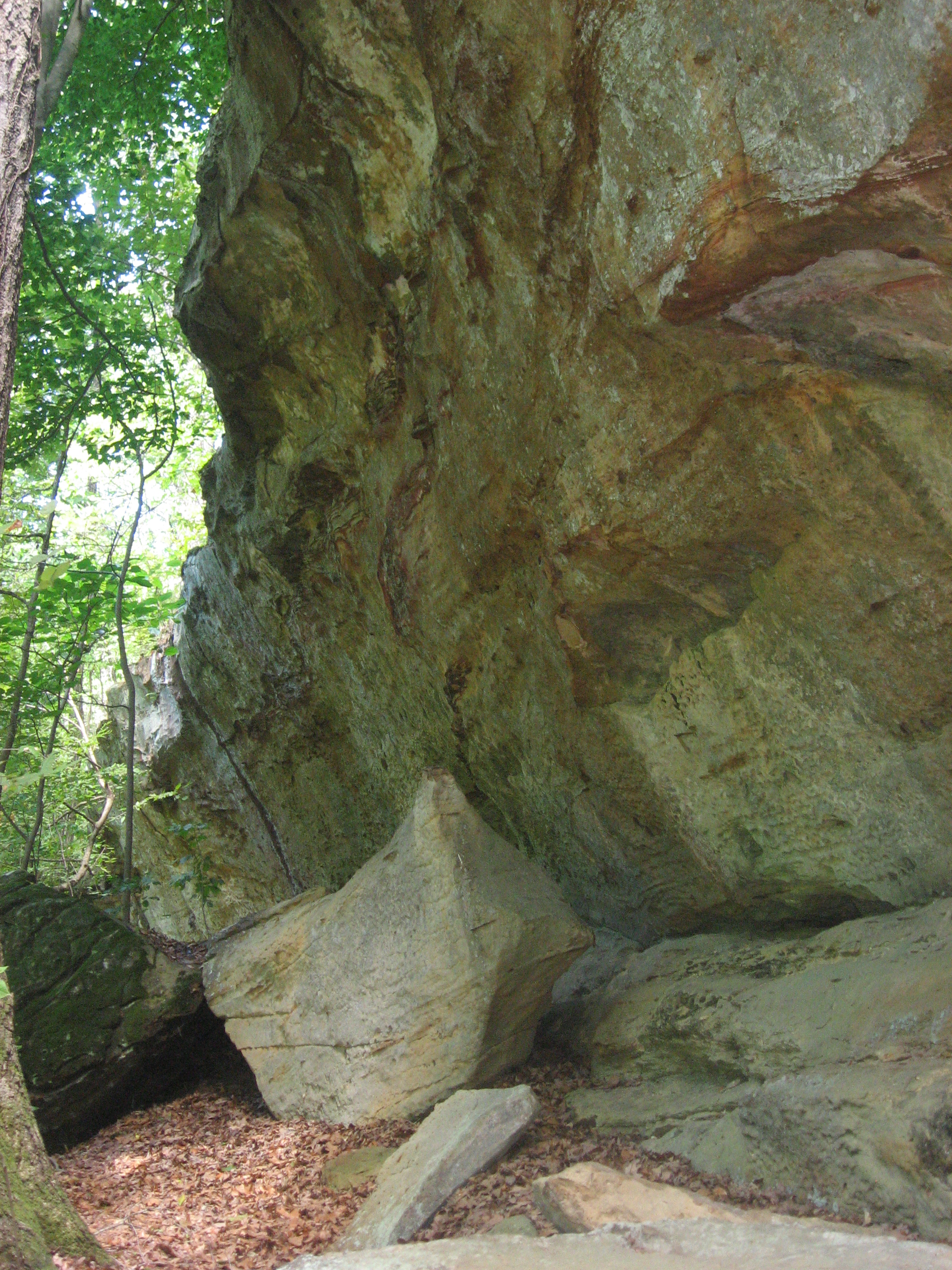
- An overview of the site

- Location within Illinois Location within the United States
- Location: North of Piney Creek in Piney Creek Ravine State Natural Area
- Nearest city: Campbell Hill, Illinois
- Coordinates: 37°53′51″N 89°38′16″W
- Area: 0.1 acres (0.040 ha)
- MPS: Native American Rock Art Sites of Illinois MPS
- NRHP reference No.: 01000599
- Added to NRHP: May 31, 2001

The Tegtmeyer Site is a prehistoric rock art site located north of Piney Creek in Piney Creek Ravine State Natural Area in Randolph County, Illinois. The site consists of two petroglyphs painted on a sandstone rock shelter. One petroglyph depicts a winged anthropomorph in flight, while the other depicts a winged zoomorph which may also be flying. Based on their similarity to other sites from the period, the petroglyphs at the site most likely date from the Mississippian period. The petroglyphs resemble some of the figures painted at the nearby Piney Creek Site; given that the Tegtmeyer Site was unsuitable for inhabitation, it was most likely used for additional paintings which could not fit at the Piney Creek Site.

The site was added to the National Register of Historic Places on May 31, 2001.
