= Piney Creek West Site =

Archaeological site in Illinois, United States

- U.S. National Register of Historic Places
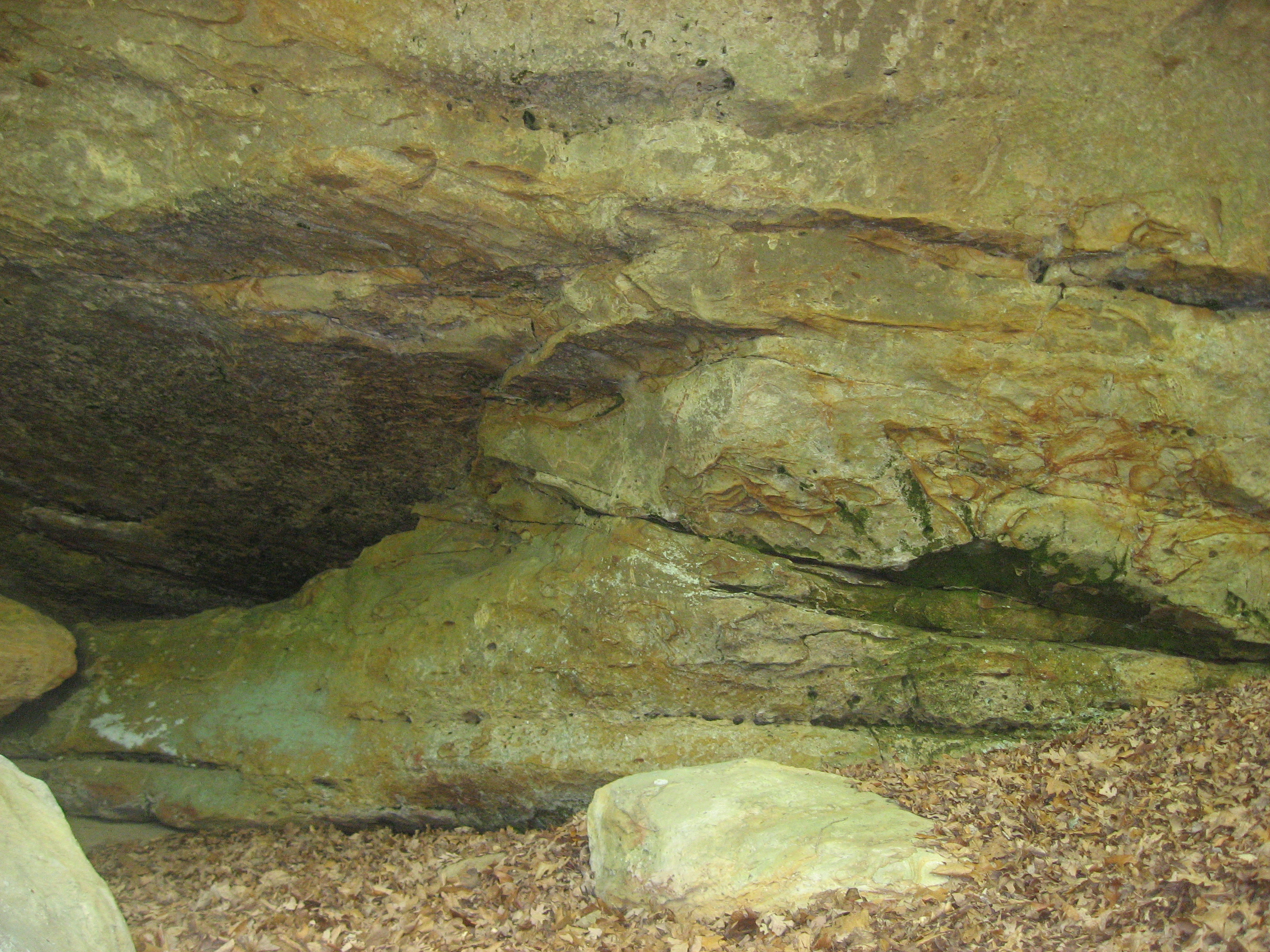
- An overview of the site

- Location within Illinois Location within the United States
- Location: North of Piney Creek in Piney Creek Ravine State Natural Area
- Nearest city: Campbell Hill, Illinois
- Coordinates: 37°53′49″N 89°38′14″W
- Area: 0.3 acres (0.12 ha)
- MPS: Native American Rock Art Sites of Illinois MPS
- NRHP reference No.: 01000600
- Added to NRHP: May 31, 2001

The Piney Creek West Site is a prehistoric rock art site located north of Piney Creek in Piney Creek Ravine State Natural Area in Randolph County, Illinois. The site consists of four petroglyphs painted on the inside of a rock shelter and a pictograph painted on the outside. The interior petroglyphs include an abstract shape, two curved lines, and a serpentine line with a pit at one end; two of the petroglyphs are filled in with ochre pigment, representing the only intact example of this painting technique in Illinois. The pictograph, which has deteriorated badly, depicts a human left hand; nearby flecks of paint from an unrecognizably faded figure likely indicate the site of the right hand. The paintings were likely added during the Late Woodland period, which lasted from 450 to 900 A.D. The serpentine figure inside the shelter suggests that the site had spiritual significance, as it resembles other prehistoric rock art depicting shamanic trance states.

The site was added to the National Register of Historic Places on May 31, 2001.
