= Modoc Rock Shelter =

Archaeological site in Illinois, United States

- U.S. National Register of Historic Places
- U.S. National Historic Landmark
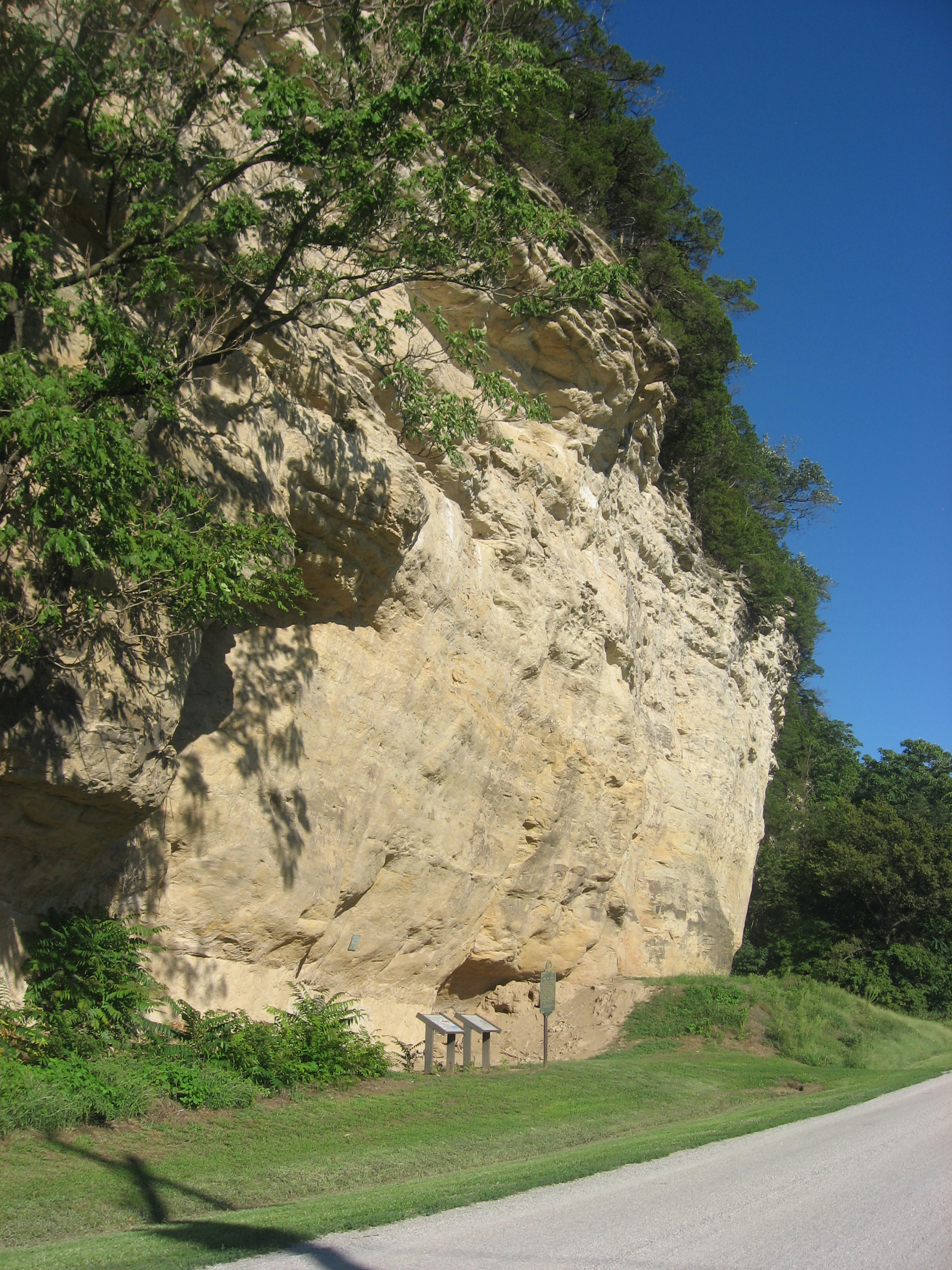
- Part of the site

- Location within Illinois Location within the United States
- Location: Randolph County, Illinois, USA
- Nearest city: Modoc, Illinois
- Coordinates: 38°03′46″N 90°03′49″W
- Architect: Natural Feature
- Architectural style: Prehistoric Erosion
- NRHP reference No.: 66000328

Significant dates
- Added to NRHP: October 15, 1966
- Designated NHL: January 20, 1961

The Modoc Rock Shelter is a rock shelter or overhang located beneath the sandstone bluffs that form the eastern border of the Mississippi River floodplain at which Native American peoples lived for thousands of years. This site is significant for its archaeological evidence of thousands of years of human habitation during the Archaic period in the Eastern United States. It is located on the northeastern side of County Road 7 (Bluff Road) southeast of Prairie du Rocher in Randolph County, Illinois, United States. It was declared a National Historic Landmark in 1961.

== Description ==
The site has over 28 feet of sediment that contains artifacts. Evidence from the site, including four separate periods of Archaic occupation and one of a later period, suggests that the cultures of the Eastern Woodlands may have been comparable in age to the big game hunting cultures of the Great Plains. Based on the analysis of artifacts, archaeologists discovered that 9,000 years ago this rock shelter was used as a short-term camp by small hunting groups; by 6,000 years ago this rock shelter was used for long-term based camps by several families which were involved in activities of everyday life; and, by around 4,000 years ago evidence found in the sediment layers suggests the site was again used by small hunting parties as a short-term camp. Their tools included concave projectile points, scrapers, choppers, hammer stones, and bone awls. Evidence has shown that during occupation, the inhabitants had a diet that consisted of deer, raccoon, opossum, birds, and fish.

== Archaeological history ==
The Modoc Rock Shelter site was discovered in 1951 by amateur archaeologist Irvin Peithmann, who is known for teaching himself about the customs of Native Americans by living among them. Peithmann had observed artifacts on the surface under or near the bluff at the Modoc site following road grading activities that resulted in the removal of sterile fill covering the buried prehistoric materials. He informed Dr. Melvin Fowler, then at the Illinois State Museum, about his discovery resulting in the ISM conducting major excavations at the site in the 1950s and 1980s. Modoc was the first site in Illinois and one of the first in eastern North America at which deeply stratified Archaic deposits had been discovered. If not for Peithmann observing artifacts at this location following the road grading, the location of this deeply stratified site would have remained unknown. Melvin Fowler believed, undoubtedly correctly, that numerous other buried bluff base Archaic sites similar to Modoc existed on the Mississippi River floodplain. Peithmann became bitter over the years regarding what he perceived as a lack of recognition by professional archaeologists over his discovery of the site, although Melvin Fowler clearly acknowledged Peithmann and credited him with the discovery of the site in his 1950s publication on Modoc Rock Shelter

== See also ==
- List of archaeological sites on the National Register of Historic Places in Illinois
- List of National Historic Landmarks in Illinois
- National Register of Historic Places listings in Randolph County, Illinois
