= Bricktown =

Bricktown may refer to the following places in the United States:

- Bricktown, Detroit, a neighborhood and People Mover station in Michigan
- Bricktown, New Jersey, a town near the Jersey shore
- Bricktown, Queens, a small neighborhood in New York City
- Bricktown, Oklahoma City, an entertainment district in downtown Oklahoma City
- Bricktown Centre at Charleston, a shopping mall in New York City
- Sparta Historic District (Sparta, Illinois), an area also known as Bricktown

== See also ==
- Bricktown Showdown, a former name for the championship game between the two leagues of Triple-A minor league baseball in the United States (2006–2012), now Triple-A Baseball National Championship Game
