= Dean Ehlers =

American college sports coach and administrator

Biographical details
- Born: June 22, 1929; Campbell Hill, Illinois, U.S.
- Died: February 19, 2017 (aged 87); Harrisonburg, Virginia, U.S.

Playing career

Basketball
- c. 1950: Central Methodist

Baseball
- c. 1950: Central Methodist
- 1948: Geneva Robins
- 1949: Ponca City Dodgers
- 1950: Asheville Tourists
- 1951: Elmira Pioneers
- 1954: Elmira Pioneers
- 1955: Pueblo Dodgers
- Position: Catcher (baseball)

Coaching career (HC unless noted)

Basketball
- 1956–1962: Memphis State (assistant)
- 1962–1966: Memphis State
- 1971–1972: James Madison

Baseball
- 1958–1961: Memphis State

Administrative career (AD unless noted)
- 1971–1993: James Madison

Head coaching record
- Overall: 69–54 (baseball); 39–39 (baseball)

Omer Dean Ehlers (June 22, 1929 – February 19, 2017) was an American college basketball and baseball coach and athletic administrator. He was the first athletic director for James Madison University and served for 22 years.

Ehlers played basketball and baseball as a student at Central Methodist University. He spent time playing baseball in the Brooklyn Dodgers organization and in the U.S. Army before embarking on his coaching career, starting as head baseball coach and assistant basketball coach at Memphis State University (now the University of Memphis). Ehlers then moved to James Madison, as the school's first athletic director while the school made the transition from a women's college to a co-ed institution. He coached the school's basketball team for a year, before hiring Lou Campanelli, who led the Dukes to their first NCAA tournament appearance in 1981. Ehlers was instrumental in founding the Colonial Athletic Association in 1985 and was the namesake for the Ehlers Award, granted by the conference to the men's and women's basketball players who “embodies the highest standards of leadership, integrity and sportsmanship in conjunction with his academic athletic achievement.”

Ehlers retired in 1993. He died on February 19, 2017, at age 87.
