= Piney Creek South Site =

Archaeological site in Illinois, United States

- U.S. National Register of Historic Places
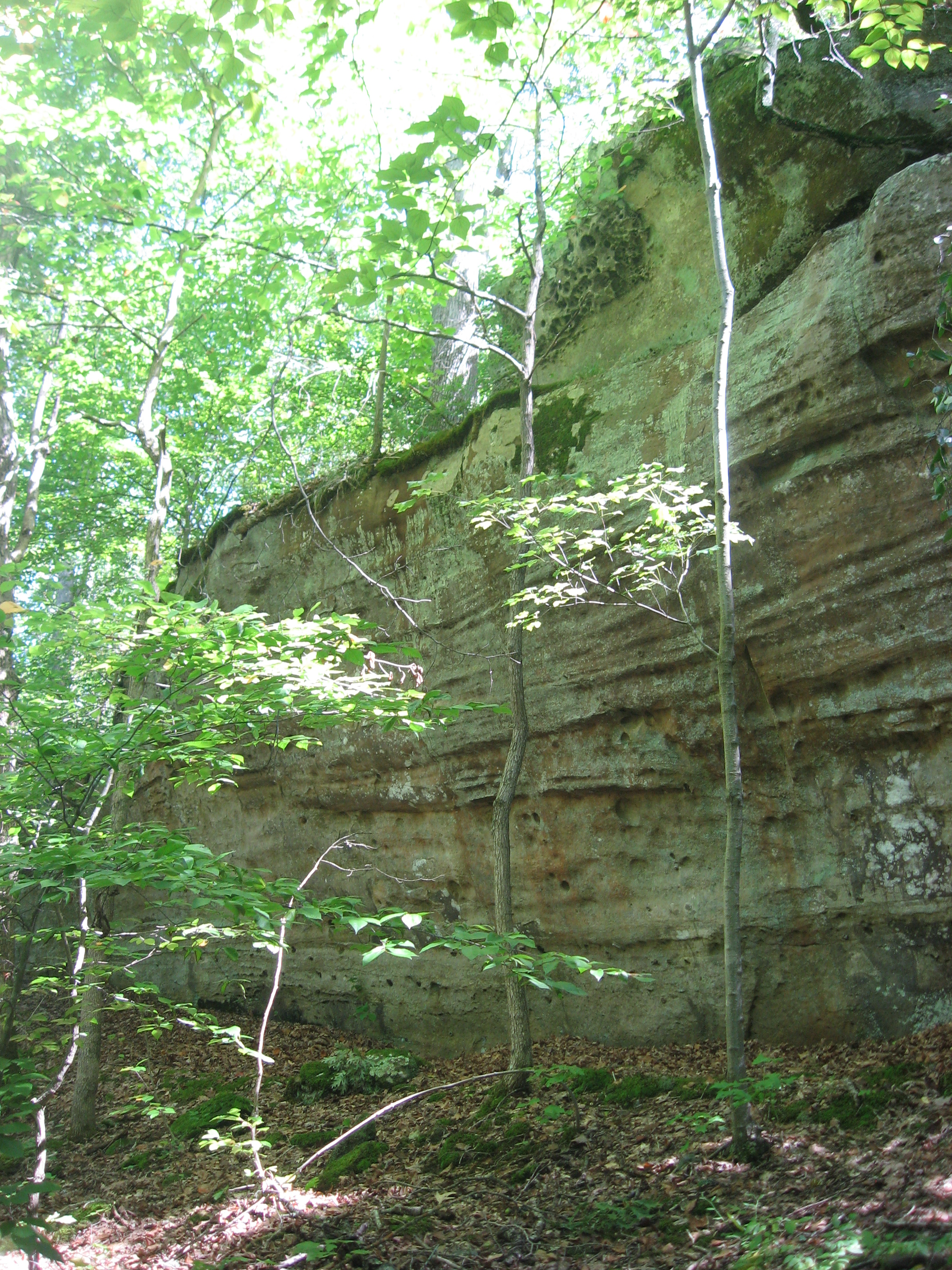
- An overview of the site

- Location within Illinois Location within the United States
- Location: South of Piney Creek in Piney Creek Ravine State Natural Area
- Nearest city: Campbell Hill, Illinois
- Coordinates: 37°53′47″N 89°38′09″W
- Area: 0.1 acres (0.040 ha)
- MPS: Native American Rock Art Sites of Illinois MPS
- NRHP reference No.: 01000602
- Added to NRHP: May 31, 2001

The Piney Creek South Site is a prehistoric rock art site located on the south side of Piney Creek in Piney Creek Ravine State Natural Area in Randolph County, Illinois. The site consists of two groups of petroglyphs drawn on a sandstone rockshelter. The petroglyphs most likely date from the Late Woodland period, which lasted from 450 to 900 A.D. The larger petroglyph group contains ten designs: four anthropomorphs, a quadruped resembling a deer, three crosses, and two pits. The four designs in the smaller group include two anthropomorphs, a group of pits extending from an anthropomorph's head, and a pecked area. Several of the anthropomorphs appear to have wings, two are carrying shields or rattles, one appears to have a beak, and one may have a crude penis. The site likely had spiritual significance, and the anthropomorphs may represent shamans, who were frequently depicted with wings in Native American art.

The site was added to the National Register of Historic Places on May 31, 2001.

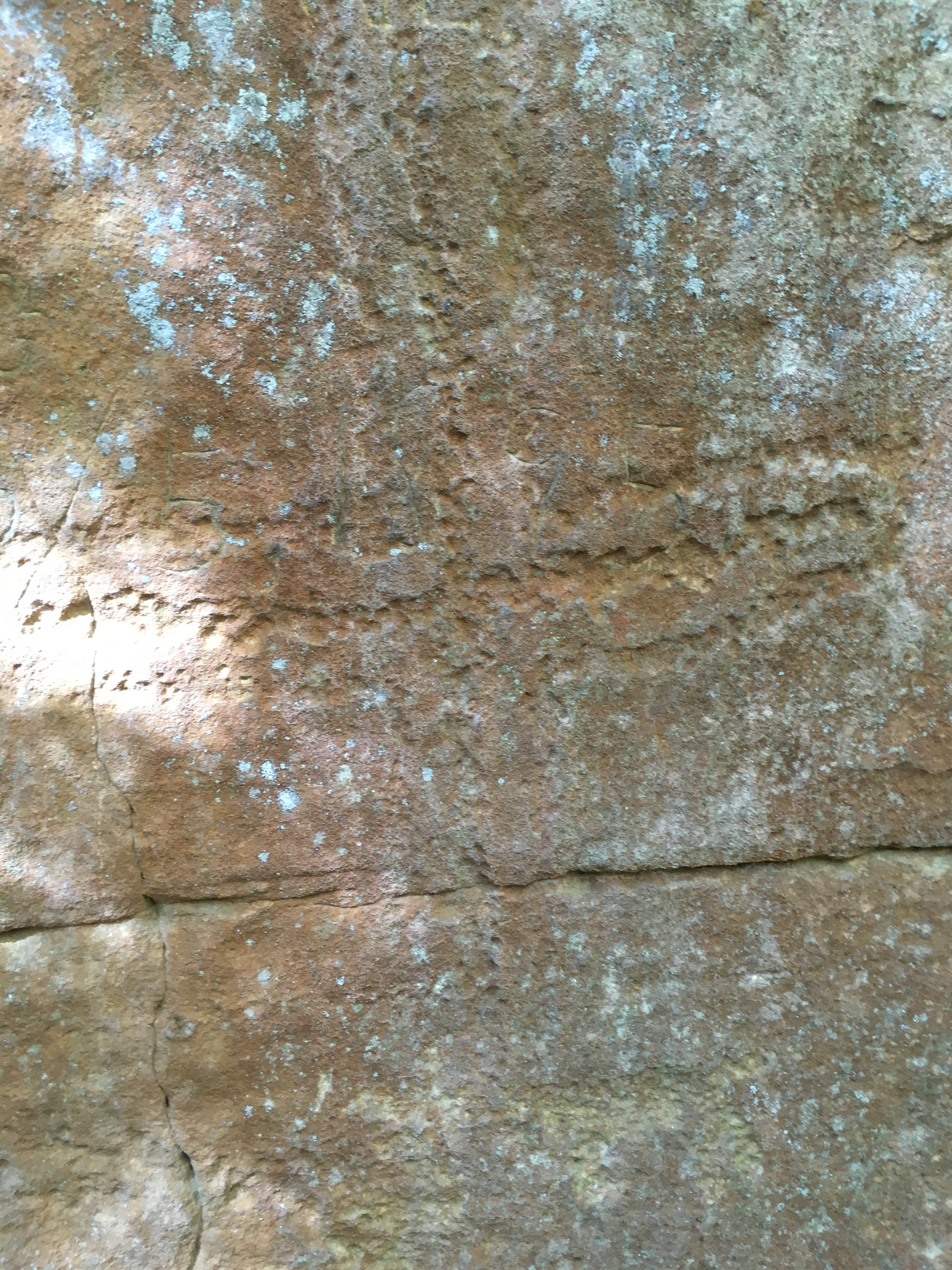
An image of one piece of prehistoric rock art at Piney Creek Ravine.

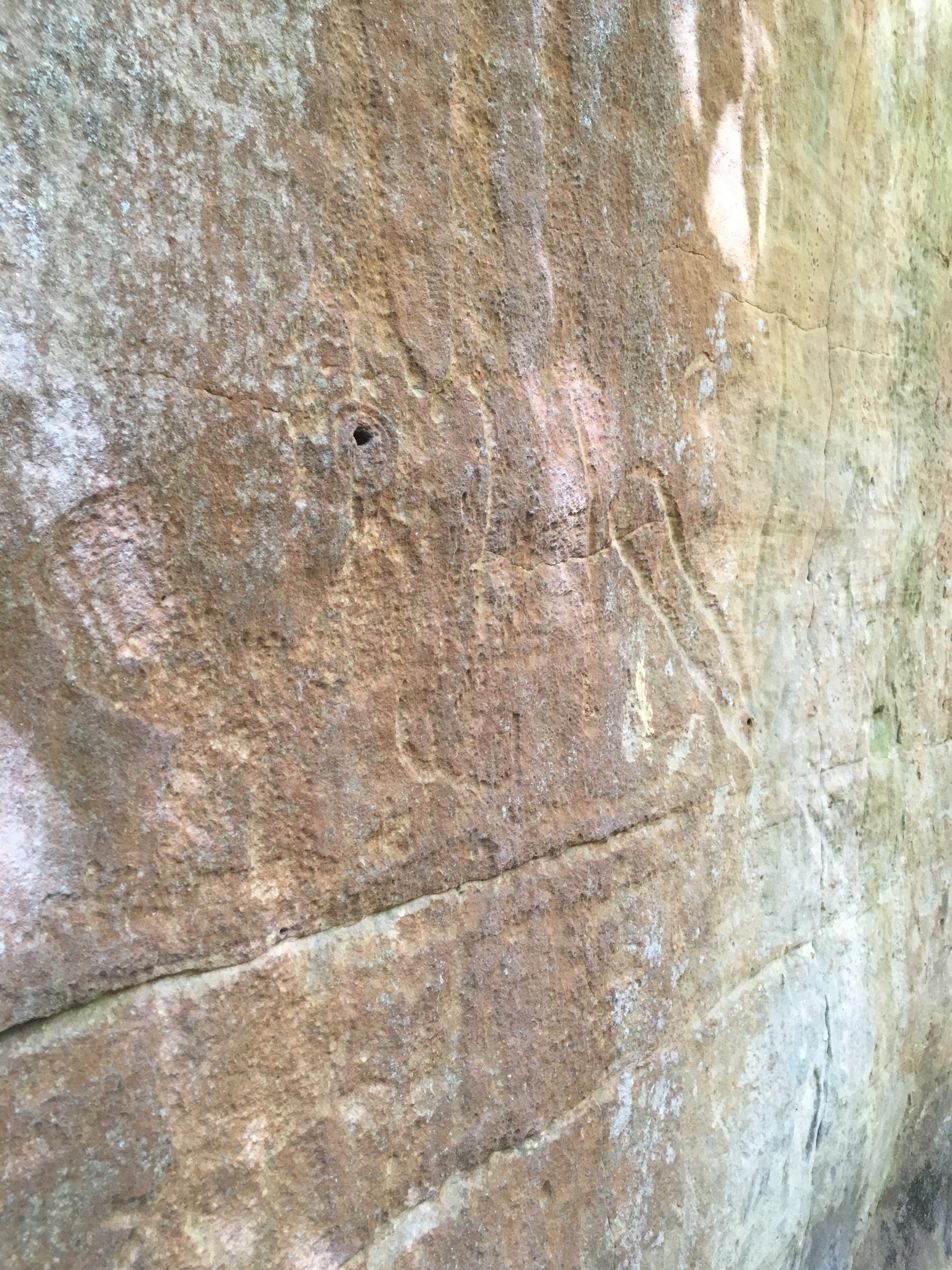
In this photo, one of the anthropomorphs along with some graffiti can be spotted.
