= Tim Springs Petroglyphs =

- U.S. National Register of Historic Places
- Nearest city: Indian Springs, Nevada
- NRHP reference No.: 74001142
- Added to NRHP: December 16, 1974

Tim Springs Petroglyphs is an archaeological site near Indian Springs, Nevada, United States, which was listed on the National Register of Historic Places in December 1974.
