= Red Bud, Illinois =

Red Bud
- City
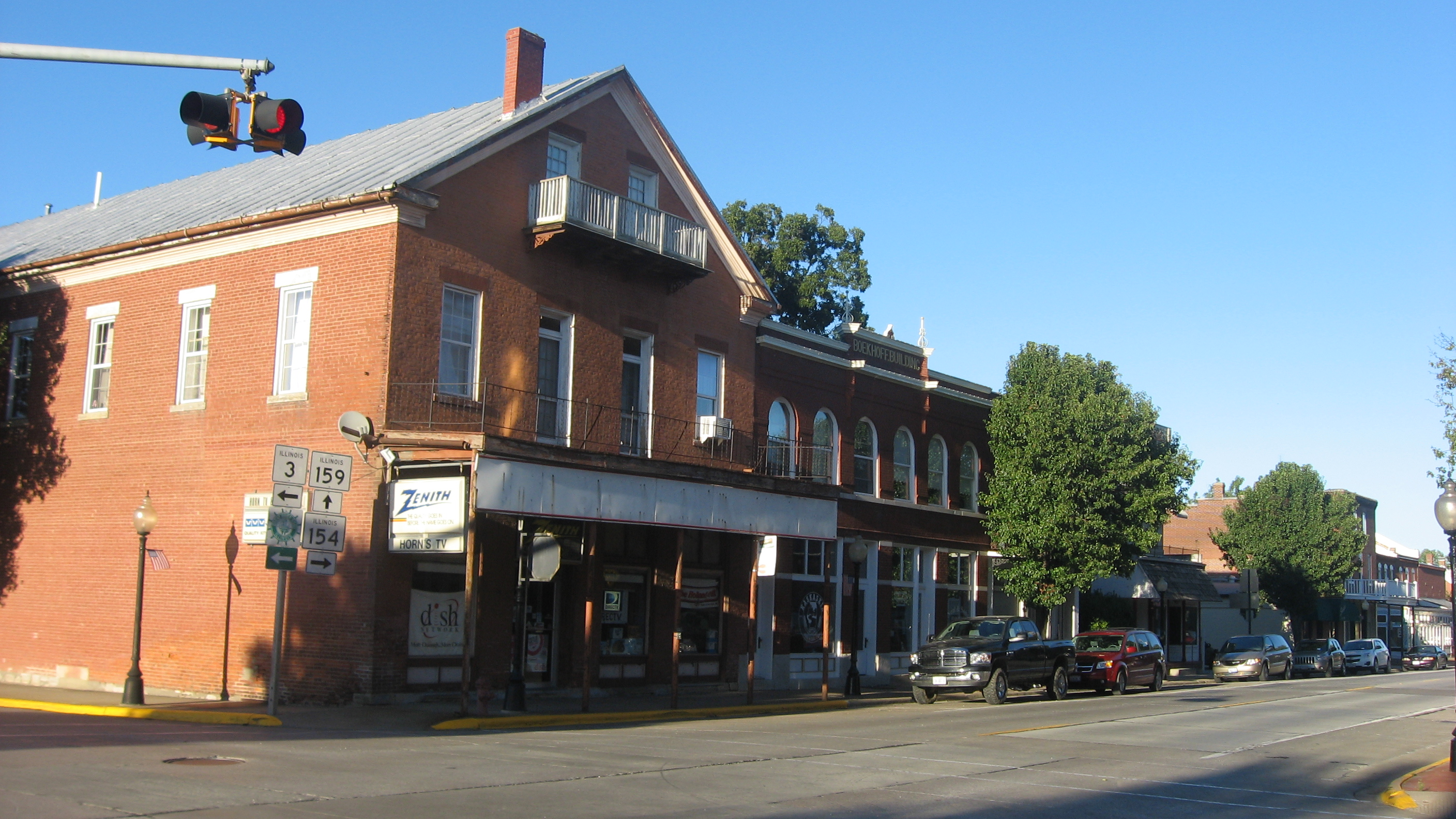
- Buildings on the northern side of the 100 block of E. Market Street in downtown Red Bud, Illinois, United States. Built in 1855 (leftmost building) and unknown dates (others), these buildings are part of the Red Bud Historic District, a historic district that is listed on the National Register of Historic Places.

- Location of Red Bud in Randolph County, Illinois.
- Coordinates: 38°12′37″N 90°00′15″W
- Country: United States
- State: Illinois
- County: Randolph

Area
  - Total: 2.64 sq mi (6.85 km^{2})
  - Land: 2.62 sq mi (6.79 km^{2})
  - Water: 0.023 sq mi (0.06 km^{2})
- Elevation: 453 ft (138 m)

Population (2020)
  - Total: 3,804
  - Density: 1,450.2/sq mi (559.92/km^{2})
- Time zone: UTC-6 (CST)
  - Summer (DST): UTC-5 (CDT)
- ZIP code: 62278
- Area code: 618
- FIPS code: 17-63043
- GNIS feature ID: 2396334
- Website: www.cityofredbud.org

Red Bud is a city in Randolph County, Illinois, in the United States. The population was 3,804 at the 2020 census.

It is the home of the Red Bud campus of Southwestern Illinois College.

== History ==
The city receives its name from the redbud tree, a species of flora that grows in the area. The first development by a European settler within what is now the city limits was made by Preston Brickey in 1820. He constructed a log cabin near the current intersection of Main and Power streets, and there cultivated a farm. In 1839, James Pollock placed a small stock of goods in the log cabin built by Henry Simmons, where he did business for about a year. This was located where Lutheran cemetery now exists. The next year he moved his stock of goods into a log building erected by John C. Crozier. He continued the business there about three years, when he moved to Preston. In 1840, R.D. Dufree became the first permanent merchant in Red Bud. Two years later he built a frame store house on the southeast corner of Main and Market streets. The first brick school house was erected in 1854, in the east part of town.

=== Incorporation and charter ===
The village of Red Bud was organized on April 19, 1866, with officers as follows: John Brickey – president of board, Gerhard Boekhoff, William Schuck, Gerhard Ortgeisen, and John Brunner. B.C.F. Janssen was appointed clerk, John Washbaugh constable, and Boekhoff treasurer.

Red Bud was chartered as a city on February 28, 1867. In April the city officer elections were held and came out as follows: Mayor- Jacob Miller; Aldermen- Alexander Green, Henry Fohrell, John Gerner, Peter Kardell, Benedict Rau, and Frederick Roepke. City Treasurer was George Carl, City Attorney was Joseph Simpson, Police Magistrate was John Stoehr, Clerk was Fred Guker, and City Marshal was J. Matt Smith.

== Geography ==
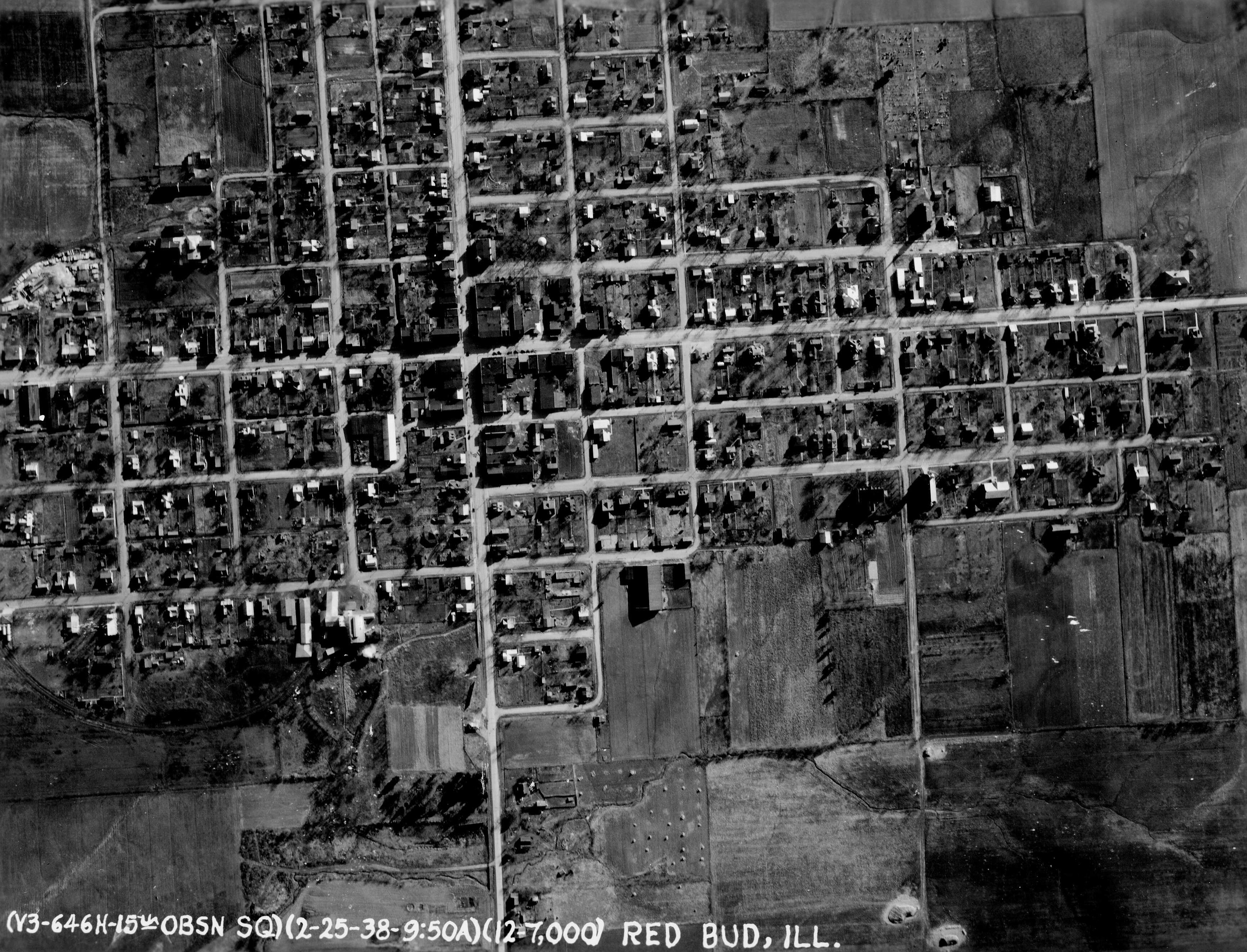
Red Bud in 1938

According to the 2010 census, Red Bud has a total area of 2.453 square miles (6.35 km^{2}), of which 2.43 square miles (6.29 km^{2}) (or 99.06%) is land and 0.023 square miles (0.06 km^{2}) (or 0.94%) is water.

Red Bud lies in the northwestern part of Randolph County and is bounded on the north and west by Monroe County, on the east by the Kaskaskia River, and on the south by Ruma and Horse creeks. Originally it was two-thirds rich rolling prairie, with good timber bordering the Kaskaskia.

== Demographics ==
Historical population
Census	Pop.	Note	%±
1870	880		—
1880	1,338		52.0%
1890	1,176		−12.1%
1900	1,169		−0.6%
1910	1,240		6.1%
1920	1,141		−8.0%
1930	1,208		5.9%
1940	1,302		7.8%
1950	1,519		16.7%
1960	1,942		27.8%
1970	2,559		31.8%
1980	2,850		11.4%
1990	2,918		2.4%
2000	3,422		17.3%
2010	3,698		8.1%
2020	3,804		2.9%
U.S. Decennial Census 2020

=== 2020 census ===
As of the 2020 census, Red Bud had a population of 3,804. The median age was 40.7 years. 22.5% of residents were under the age of 18 and 21.7% of residents were 65 years of age or older. For every 100 females there were 89.4 males, and for every 100 females age 18 and over there were 85.7 males age 18 and over.

0.0% of residents lived in urban areas, while 100.0% lived in rural areas.

There were 1,606 households in Red Bud, of which 28.9% had children under the age of 18 living in them. Of all households, 47.4% were married-couple households, 16.3% were households with a male householder and no spouse or partner present, and 29.5% were households with a female householder and no spouse or partner present. About 32.5% of all households were made up of individuals and 16.6% had someone living alone who was 65 years of age or older.

There were 1,709 housing units, of which 6.0% were vacant. The homeowner vacancy rate was 1.8% and the rental vacancy rate was 5.1%.

Racial composition as of the 2020 census
Race	Number	Percent
White	3,559	93.6%
Black or African American	25	0.7%
American Indian and Alaska Native	4	0.1%
Asian	15	0.4%
Native Hawaiian and Other Pacific Islander	1	0.0%
Some other race	21	0.6%
Two or more races	179	4.7%
Hispanic or Latino (of any race)	60	1.6%

=== 2000 census ===
As of the 2000 census, there were 3,422 people, 4,370 households, and 935 families residing in the city. The population density was 1,626.3 inhabitants per square mile (627.9/km^{2}). There were 1,462 housing units at an average density of 694.8 units per square mile (268.3 units/km^{2}). The racial makeup of the city was 98.71% White, 0.32% Asian, 0.09% from other races, and 0.88% from two or more races. Hispanic or Latino of any race were 0.88% of the population.

There were 1,370 households, out of which 31.5% had children under the age of 18 living with them, 55.0% were married couples living together, 10.2% had a female householder with no husband present, and 31.7% were non-families. 28.4% of all households were made up of individuals, and 16.4% had someone living alone who was 65 years of age or older. The average household size was 2.40 and the average family size was 2.95.

In the city, the population was spread out, with 23.2% under the age of 18, 8.1% from 18 to 24, 25.9% from 25 to 44, 23.0% from 45 to 64, and 19.9% who were 65 years of age or older. The median age was 40 years. For every 100 females, there were 86.4 males. For every 100 females age 18 and over, there were 81.8 males.

The median income for a household in the city was $40,300, and the median income for a family was $50,280. Males had a median income of $36,049 versus $20,957 for females. The per capita income for the city was $19,967. About 6.0% of families and 9.4% of the population were below the poverty line, including 10.1% of those under age 18 and 13.0% of those age 65 or over.

== Notable people ==
- Conrad F. Becker, Illinois State Treasurer and Mayor of Red Bud
- James Birchler, member of National Academy of Sciences
- Martin Stephan, exiled Bishop of the German Lutheran emigration to Perry County, Missouri
