= Calpet Rockshelter =

- Archeological Site No. 48SU354
- U.S. National Register of Historic Places
- Nearest city: Big Piney, Wyoming
- Area: 1.1 acres (0.45 ha)
- NRHP reference No.: 94000439
- Added to NRHP: May 13, 1994

The Calpet Rockshelter, also known as the Overlook Rockshelter and Archeological Site 48SU354, is an archeological site in Sublette County, Wyoming. The site includes an overhanging rock outcrop at the base of a butte that was used by Native Americans and European-Americans. The Native American use includes occupation by the Shoshone. A number of surface artifacts have been found and at least two buried cultural levels have been investigated from the Fremont and late Prehistoric-period Shoshone. Fremont, Prehistoric, Protohistoric and Historic-period visitation is documented at nine petroglyph panels.

The site was placed on the National Register of Historic Places in 1994.
