= Eddy Aragon =

American talk radio host

- Occupations: Conservative talk radio host, business owner, political candidate
- Employer: KIVA (AM) (Owner)
- Organization(s): Rock of Talk, LLC
- Known for: 2021 Albuquerque mayoral candidate, host of The Rock of Talk
- Political party: Republican
- Website: therockoftalk.com

Eddy Aragon is a conservative talk radio host based in Albuquerque, New Mexico, United States. He owns the KIVA (AM) radio station.

== Career ==
In November 2019, radio host and mayoral candidate Aragon received an anonymous email regarding disturbing claims about Jeffrey Epstein's Zorro Ranch property. The email, which Aragon forwarded to the FBI, was published as part of the Epstein files in February 2026.

Aragon was a mayoral candidate for the city of Albuquerque in 2021. A petition was submitted to Linda Stover, the Bernalillo County Clerk, to have Aragon removed from the ballot on the basis that he did not reside in a residential zone, thus disqualifying him from holding office. Aragon himself stated that he had "history" with the person who filed the petition: "The person who's filing the petition has a long history of hate toward me. And IHateEddyAragon.com. [...] What they're actually looking at here is an overlay. So their argument here is easily defeated. I look forward to seeing them in court." He would go on to be defeated by incumbent Mayor Tim Keller.

In May 2025, he announced plans to run against U.S. Representative Gabe Vasquez for New Mexico’s 2nd congressional district in the 2026 United States elections.

== Political positions ==
On the issue of partisan politics, he is quoted as follows: "I’m a Republican, but I am also someone who assesses a situation and will always question things, and represent the people of Congressional District 2. I have to think about the people of New Mexico, first and foremost."

On the issue of methamphetamine, Breaking Bad, and the series' cultural impact, Aragon is quoted by Variety as follows: "It’s not the type of recognition we want for the city of Albuquerque, or for our state. What you saw on Breaking Bad should be a documentary, honestly. I think, really, that is the reality in New Mexico. We try to say it’s fictional, but that is the reality... we’ve joked that [Breaking Bad] should be on PBS. That is, unfortunately, the reality."

On the issue of immigration to the United States, he is quoted as follows: "[New Mexico] has been invaded and permeated by violent drug gangs from south of the border. Meanwhile, Vasquez has called Homeland Security’s effort to deport illegal criminals a 'reality TV game.' Mr. Vasquez has never even tried to keep New Mexico safe, and he never will."

He supports the tariffs in the second Trump administration. He said: "People will see long-term that it is for the good of the country, and I think that it’s a vision that the news media unfortunately doesn’t allow him to go ahead and communicate very well."

== Personal life ==
Aragon was arrested for driving while intoxicated in October 2022 and sentenced to one-year probation in December. The incident occurred after people reported him "driving erratically in the Albuquerque International Sunport parking garage." Authorities said he registered twice the legal limit when they found him. He was required to complete "DWI school" and have an interlock installed in his vehicle.
