= Elliot Bay Petroglyphs =

Coordinates: 47.565°N 122.350°W

The Elliot Bay Petroglyphs, also known as 45KI23, are petroglyphs created before recorded times by the Duwamish people in present-day Seattle. According to various archaeological reports (involved in Washington State Route 519 and other works), the petroglyphs "at the southern end of Elliott Bay near the mouth of the Duwamish River", today in Seattle's Industrial District, may have been buried or stolen when the Duwamish estuary and tidal flats were developed and filled during settlement of the city. Richard McClure, a researcher from The Evergreen State College described the inscriptions as "pecked figures of a zoomorphic nature".

== See also ==
- Duwamish Number 1 Site
