= Black Mountain Rock Art District =

Archaeological site in California, United States

- Black Canyon--Inscription Canyon--Black Mountain Rock Art District
- U.S. National Register of Historic Places
- U.S. Historic district
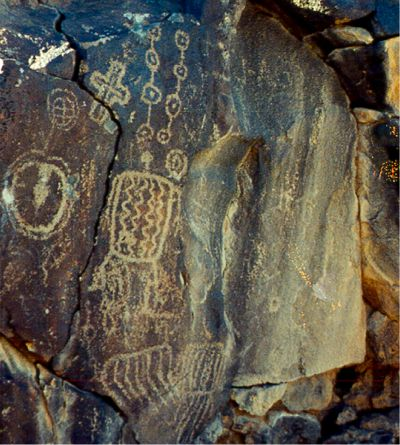
- Petroglyphs in the district
- Nearest city: Hinkley, California
- Area: 39,700 acres (16,100 ha)
- NRHP reference No.: 00001046
- Added to NRHP: September 12, 2000

The Black Mountain Rock Art District is an archaeological district located in the Mojave Desert northwest of Barstow, San Bernardino County, California. The district includes a large collection of Native American rock art, including over 12,000 petroglyphs. The largest group of petroglyphs, which includes over 1,000 of the designs, is in Inscription Canyon. The more complex designs include humanoid figures, shields, masks, baskets, deer, bighorn sheep, and other plants and animals. Other petroglyphs represent patterns such as circles, lines, and zigzags. Native Americans made petroglyphs in the area due to its abundance of easily marked lava rock and hard quartz for making etching tools.

The district was added to the National Register of Historic Places on September 12, 2000.
