= Piney Creek Site =

Archaeological site in Illinois, United States

- U.S. National Register of Historic Places
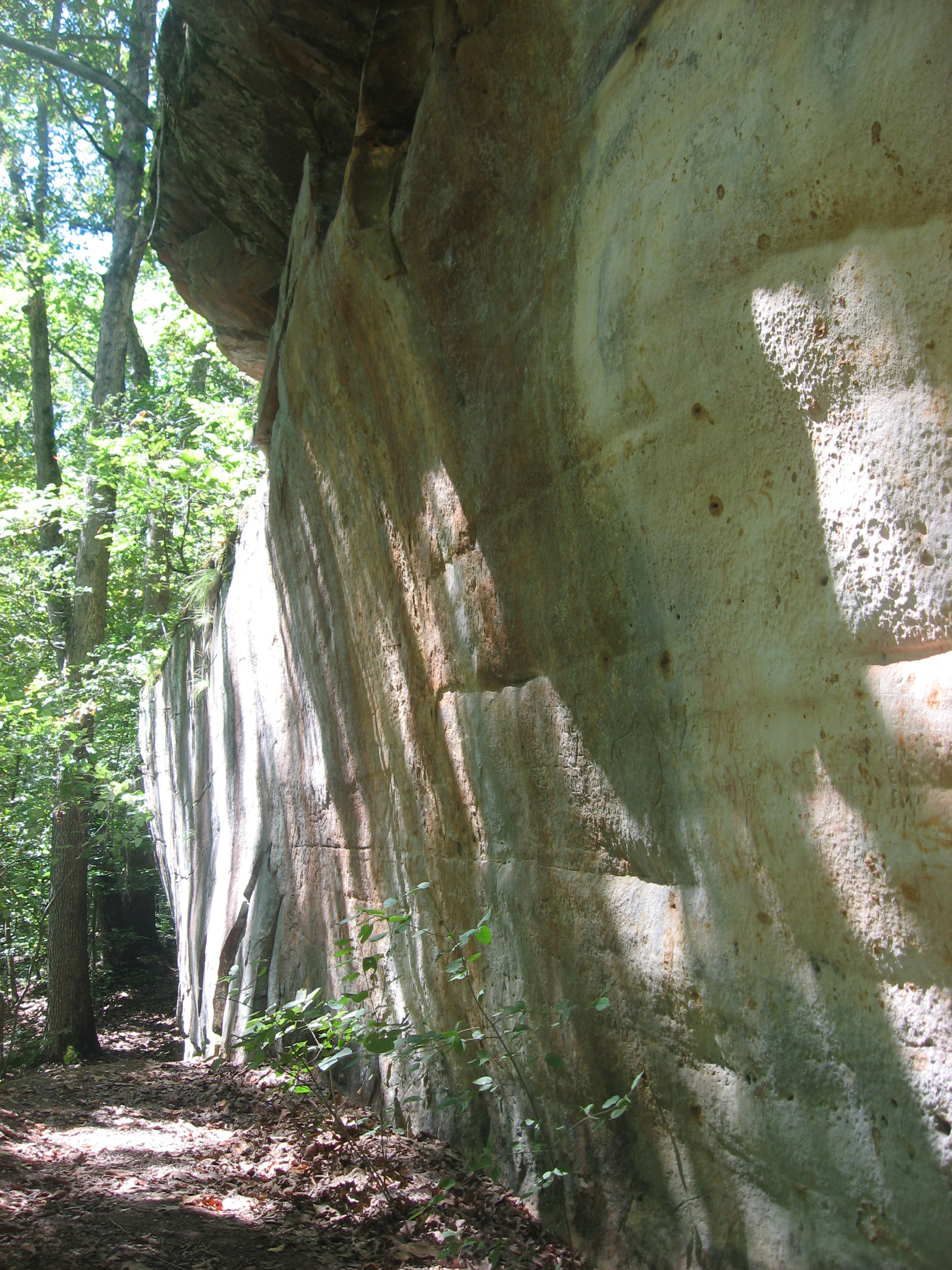
- An overview of the site

- Location within Illinois Location within the United States
- Location: North of Piney Creek in Piney Creek Ravine State Natural Area
- Nearest city: Campbell Hill, Illinois
- Coordinates: 37°53′49″N 89°38′10″W
- Area: 0.1 acres (0.040 ha)
- MPS: Native American Rock Art Sites of Illinois MPS
- NRHP reference No.: 01000601
- Added to NRHP: May 31, 2001

The Piney Creek Site is a prehistoric rock art site located on the north side of Piney Creek in Piney Creek Ravine State Natural Area in Randolph County, Illinois. The site consists of a sandstone outcropping with over 150 petroglyph and pictograph designs, the most at a single known site in Illinois. The designs are divided into four distinct groups; three of these are on the center and ends of the rock shelter's wall, while the fourth is on a joint block of sandstone within the shelter. Most of the designs were created during the Late Woodland and Mississippian periods, which spanned from 450 to 1550 A.D.; a number of the figures were added after 1550. A 1 metre (3 ft 3 in) tall spear-holding anthropomorph in the western group is the largest individual petroglyph in Illinois. In addition to anthropomorphs, other common designs at the site include zoomorphs, quadrupeds which probably represent deer, and symbols; the quadrupeds and anthropomorphs are frequently depicted in motion. The rock shelter was likely used as a religious site by prehistoric inhabitants, and several of the designs appear to have mystical or spiritual significance; for instance, the winged anthropomorphs likely represent shamans.

The site was added to the National Register of Historic Places on May 31, 2001.
