= Northern Avenue Petroglyph Site =

Archaeological site in Arizona, United States

- U.S. National Register of Historic Places
- Location: Kingman, Arizona
- Area: 0.2 acres (0.081 ha)
- NRHP reference No.: 96001054
- Added to NRHP: October 3, 1996

The Northern Avenue Petroglyph Site, in Kingman, Arizona, is a 0.2-acre (0.081 ha) archeological site that was listed on the U.S. National Register of Historic Places in 1996. It has also been known as "AZ F;12:22(ASM)". It served as a ceremonial site and an animal facility, in prehistory.

Its location is not disclosed by the National Register, presumably towards protecting its potential to yield future information. However it has been stated by a local petroglyphs club to be located with the Kingman town limits.
