= Jeffry Cliff Petroglyphs (15HA114) =

National Historic Site of the United States

Coordinates: 37°52′41″N 86°40′59″W

- U.S. National Register of Historic Places
- Location within Kentucky
- Location: Hancock County, Kentucky
- NRHP reference No.: 89001191
- Added to NRHP: September 8, 1989

Jeffry Cliff Petroglyphs (15HA114) are prehistoric petroglyphs created by Native Americans, that lived in the western region of what is now the U.S. state of Kentucky. They are located on and around Jeffry Cliff in Hancock County, although the address is restricted. The petroglyphs cover a roughly 9-acre (0.036 km^{2}) area and are open to public access. These petroglyphs were designated a National Historical Site by the National Park Service on September 8, 1989, and were subsequently assigned the reference number 89001191. The petroglyphs appear to be created for several purposes that include art, religion, and engineering.
