= Red Bud Historic District =

Historic district in Illinois, United States

- U.S. National Register of Historic Places
- U.S. Historic district
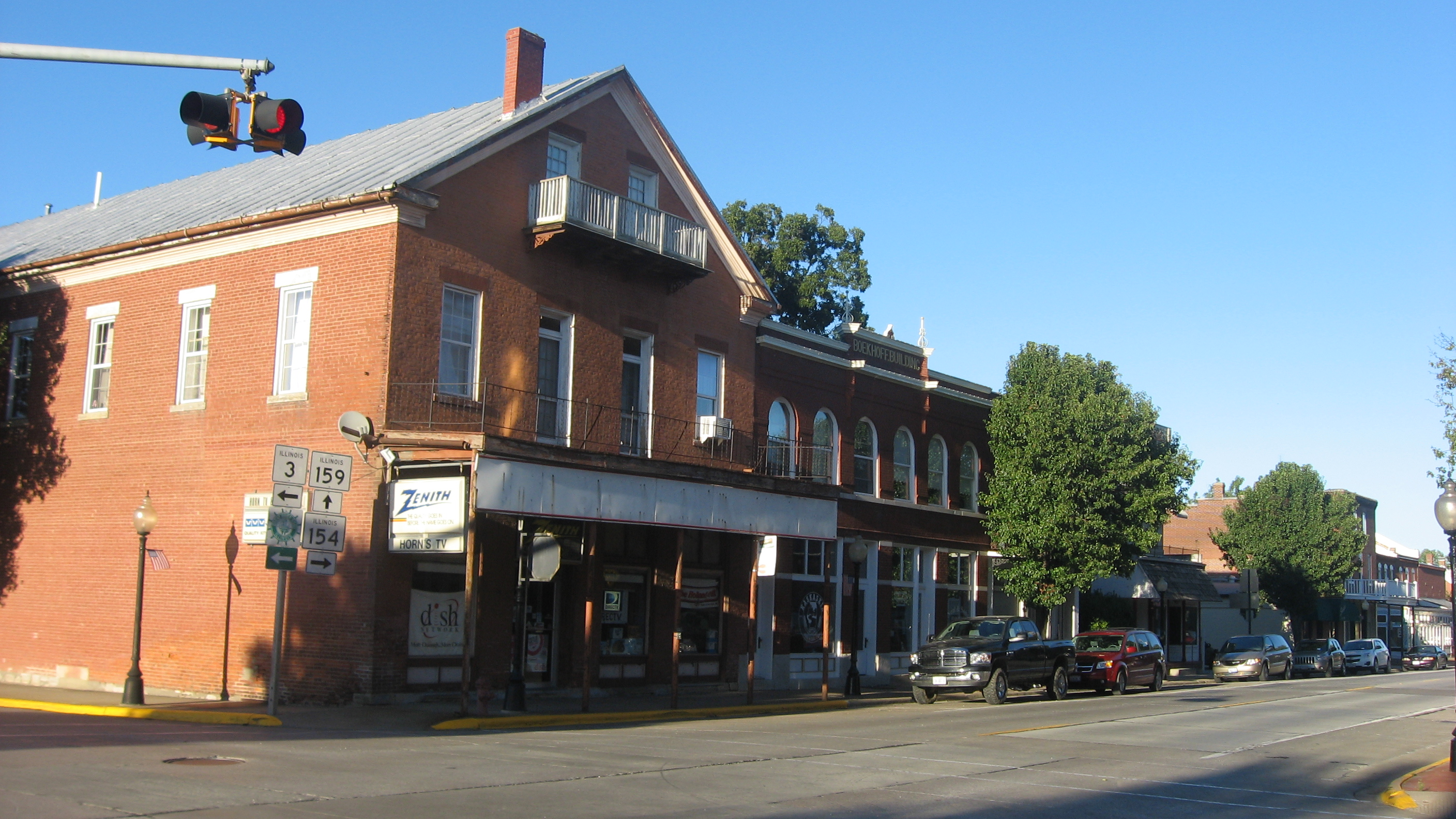

- Location within Illinois Location within the United States
- Location: Irregular pattern along Main and Market Sts., Red Bud, Illinois
- Coordinates: 38°12′33″N 89°59′37″W
- Area: 64 acres (26 ha)
- NRHP reference No.: 79000865
- Added to NRHP: December 29, 1979

The Red Bud Historic District is a commercial and residential historic district which includes the originally developed portions of Red Bud, Illinois, United States. The district is centered on Main and Market Streets, the primary roads through the city. One hundred and ninety-five buildings and structures, including 138 contributing buildings, are included in the district. The oldest building in the district, the Greek Revival Durfee and Crozier Store, dates from 1855, seven years after Red Bud was platted. The community rapidly developed between the 1850s and 1880s, and architectural styles from these decades are prominently represented in the district. The Federal and Italianate styles are the two most prevalent in the district, the latter being an especially popular commercial design. Gothic Revival churches, Second Empire buildings, and a number of German-style cottages can also be found in the district. Development and population growth in Red Bud remained stable in Red Bud from the 1890s through most of the 20th century, and the historically developed core makes up most of the modern city.

The district was added to the National Register of Historic Places on December 29, 1979.
