= Old Fire Station, Kennington =

Fire station in Lambeth, London, England

Coordinates: 51.491217°N 0.105123°W

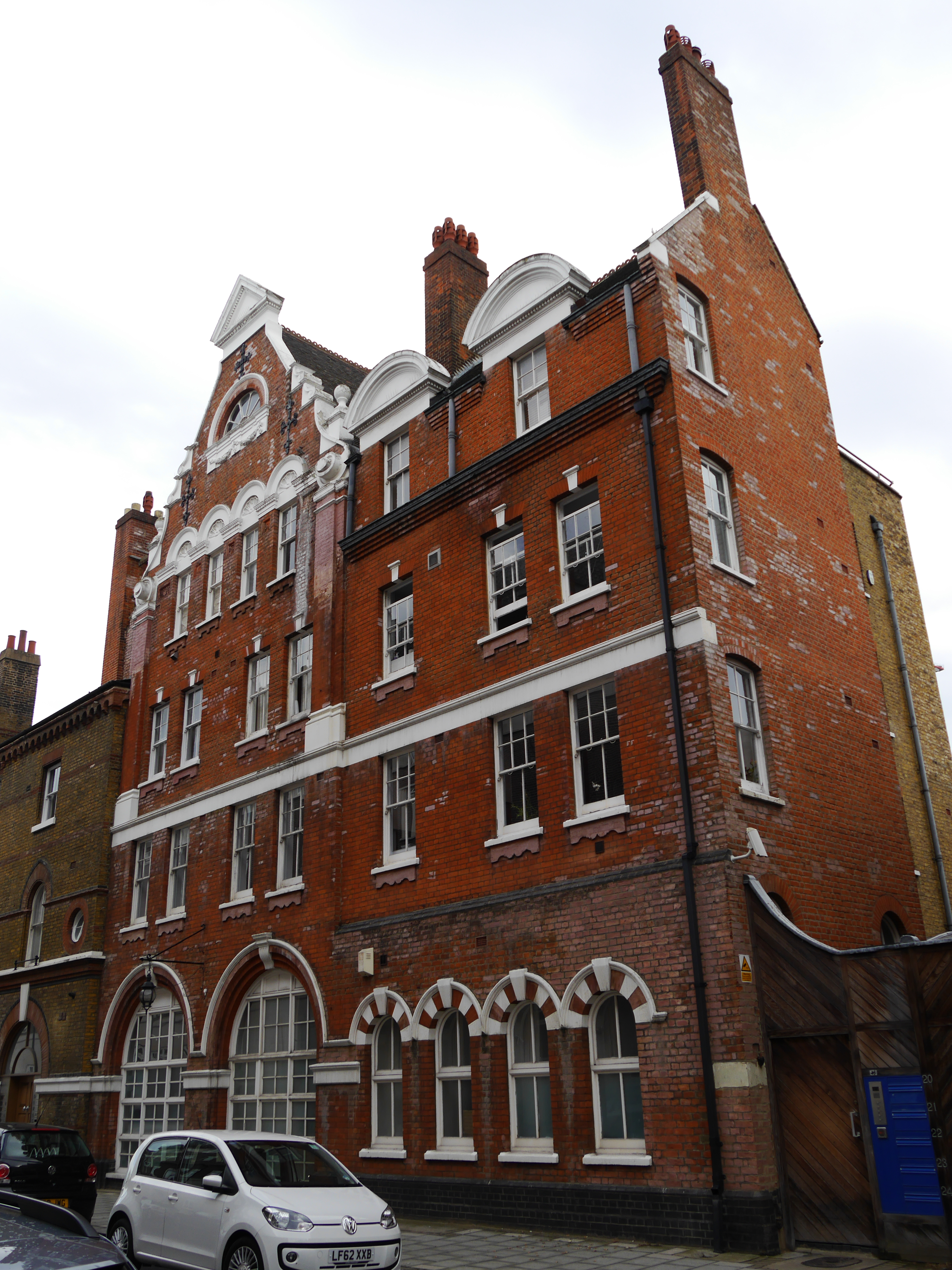
Old Fire Station, 2014

The Old Fire Station is a Grade II listed former fire station in Renfrew Road, Kennington, London SE11.

It was built in 1868 for the Metropolitan Fire Brigade, by the architect Edward Cresy, and extended in 1896 for the London County Council, by the architect Robert Pearsall and his assistants.
