= Frederick Weistar House =

Historic house in Illinois, United States

- U.S. National Register of Historic Places
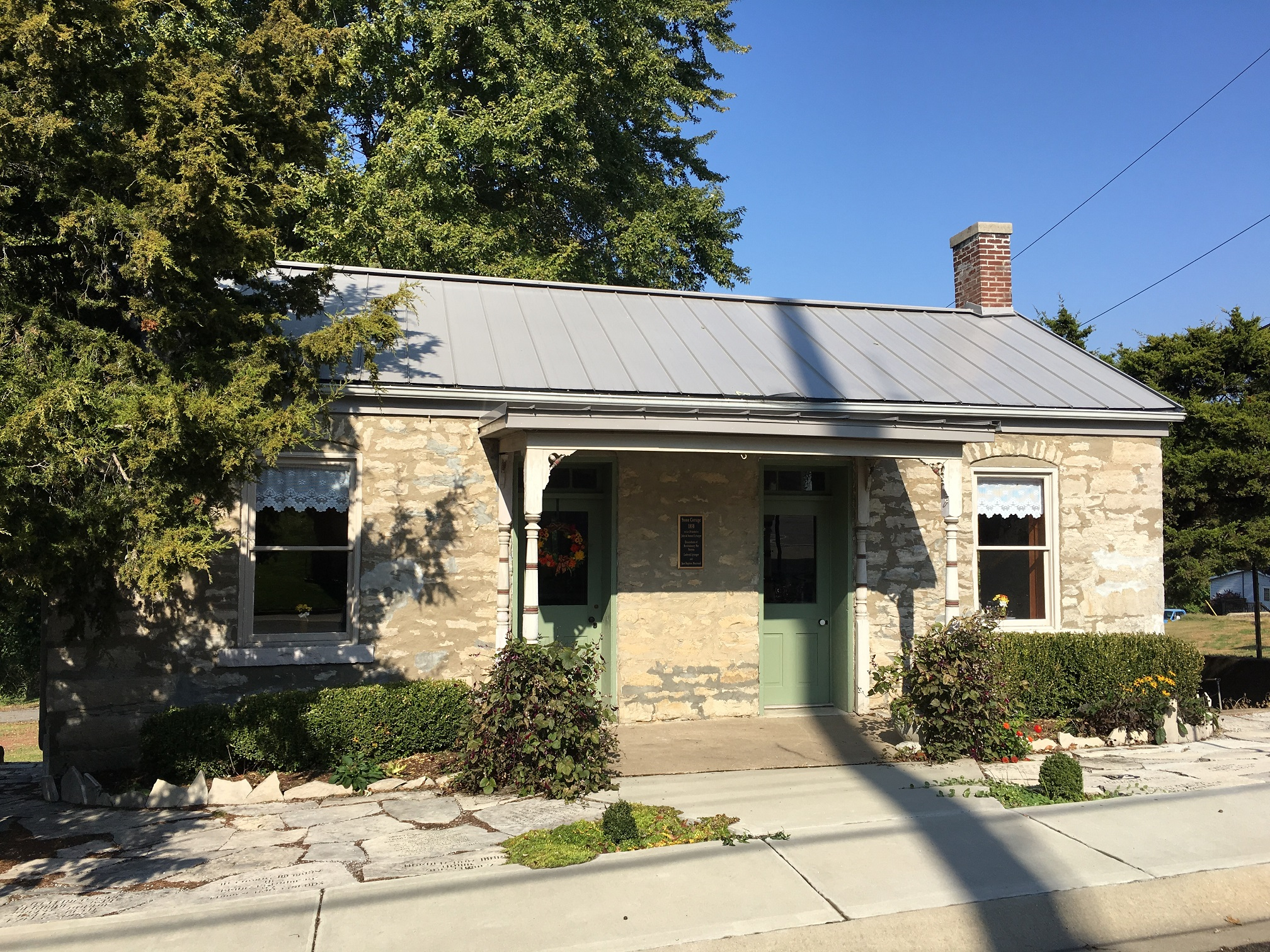

- Location within Illinois Location within the United States
- Location: 515 Chestnut St., Chester, Illinois
- Coordinates: 37°54′15″N 89°49′44″W
- Built: c. 1859
- Architectural style: Two-door facade
- NRHP reference No.: 100002573
- Added to NRHP: June 15, 2018

The Frederick Weistar House is a historic stone cottage house at 515 Chestnut Street in Chester, Illinois. The house was built circa 1859 for Frederick Weistar, a Swiss immigrant. The house has a vernacular design with a two-door facade pattern, in which two front doors provided access to each of the house's two first-floor rooms. The house itself was two rooms wide and one room deep which provided access to most of the house. While the two-door facade is common in vernacular architecture, the purpose of the two doors is historically disputed; as the form is especially prevalent in German vernacular architecture, it may have been inspired by traditional German architecture, though it may have also functioned as a way to separate public and private spaces in a home. This particular design of house was very popular for single-family residences. The one-story limestone house also features a wooden front porch with carved columns and brackets, its only significant decorative element.

On the outside front of the house remains a plaque that states "Stone Cottage 1850 on Lot 20 deeded to John & Samuel Lybarger Descendants of Revolutionary War Patriots Ludwick Lybarger and Jean Baptiste Montreuil". The house allows visitors to see a more modest Family home that was built in the mid 1800s to get a better understanding of life during this time period.

The house was added to the National Register of Historic Places (#100002573) on June 15, 2018; its name was misspelled "Frederick Weister House" in its listing. The house is also a part of the Randolph County Museum.
