= Lake Lenore Caves State Park =

State park in Washington (state), United States

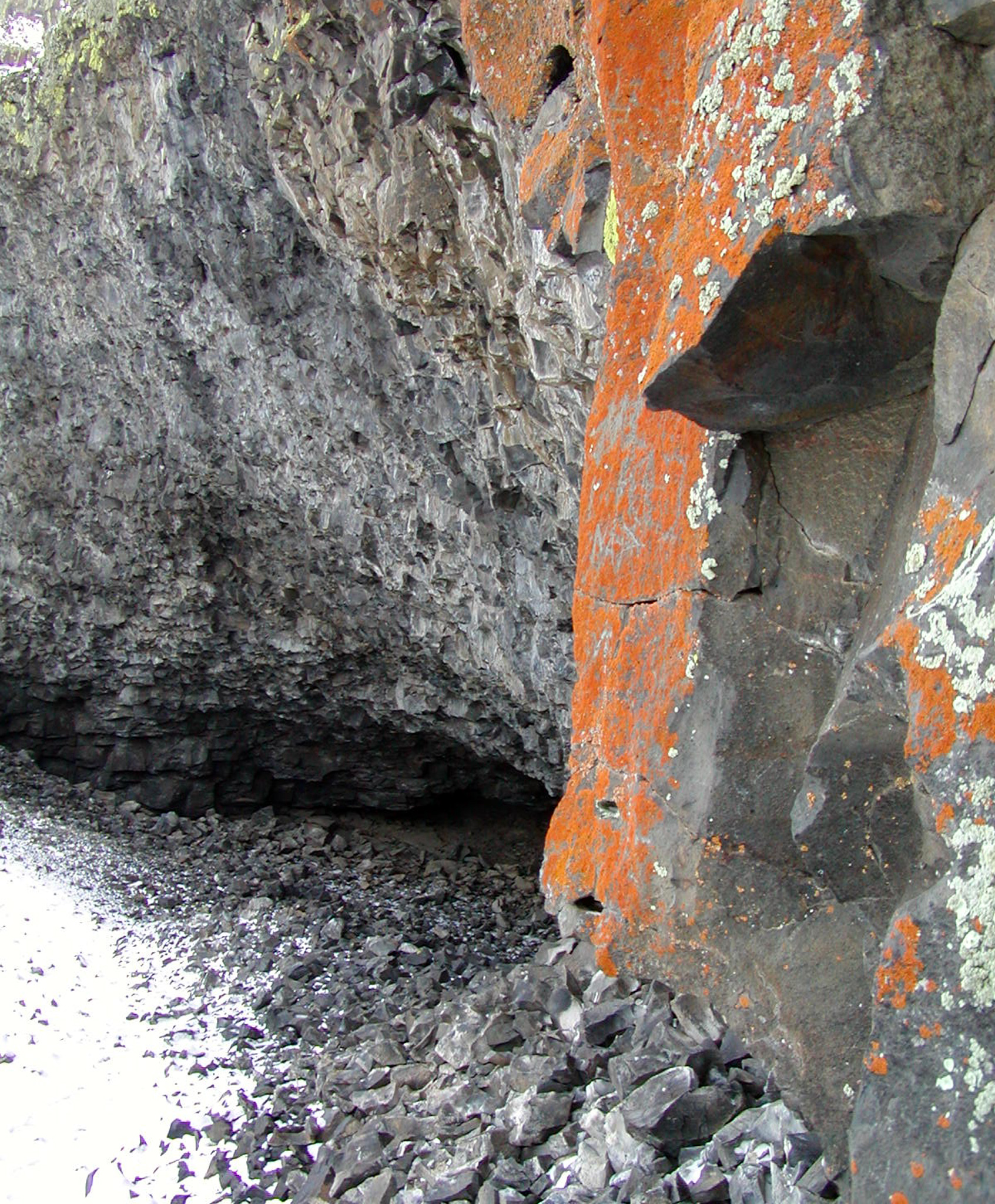
- A rock shelter in the park

- Location within Washington (state) Location within the United States
- Location: Grant, Washington, United States
- Coordinates: 47°28′N 119°31′W
- Area: 155 acres (63 ha)
- Operator: Washington State Parks and Recreation Commission
- Property information from Grant County assessor

Lake Lenore Caves State Park is a Washington State Park in the Lenore Canyon extending into the hills from the shore of Lake Lenore. It is part of the Ice Age Floods National Geologic Trail. Lake Lenore and the rock shelter "caves" were caused by basalt coulee cliffs underscoured by the Missoula floods, the same floods that created the Channeled Scablands.

There are indications that Native Americans used the caves for shelter. Some petroglyphs are in the caves.
