= American Indian Rock Art in Minnesota MPS =

Archaeological site in Minnesota, U.S.

American Indian Rock Art in Minnesota MPS is a Multiple Property Submission (MPS) of the eligibility of many rock art properties for listing on the National Register of Historic Places. The listing is to protect and preserve Native American petroglyphs, pictographs and petroform rock art sites in the present day U.S. state of Minnesota.

== Historic places ==
The Submission states:

"The properties are grouped under a single historic context, Rock Art of Minnesota, ca. 10,000 BC to 1700 AD, which subsumes all defined rock art types and sites constructed or otherwise developed state-wide by Minnesota's original inhabitants. Three property types are recognized, petroglyphs, pictographs and petroforms; the rationale for defining three property types derives from the observation that the distribution of each is rather limited to specific areas of the state, with petroglyphs found almost exclusively in the southern part of the state, pictographs limited to the northeast, and petroforms recognized only in southwesternmost Minnesota. Moreover, available analysis suggests that these three types initially appeared at very different times and, further, even a cursory assessment indicates that the property types are characterized by a divergence of style and content."

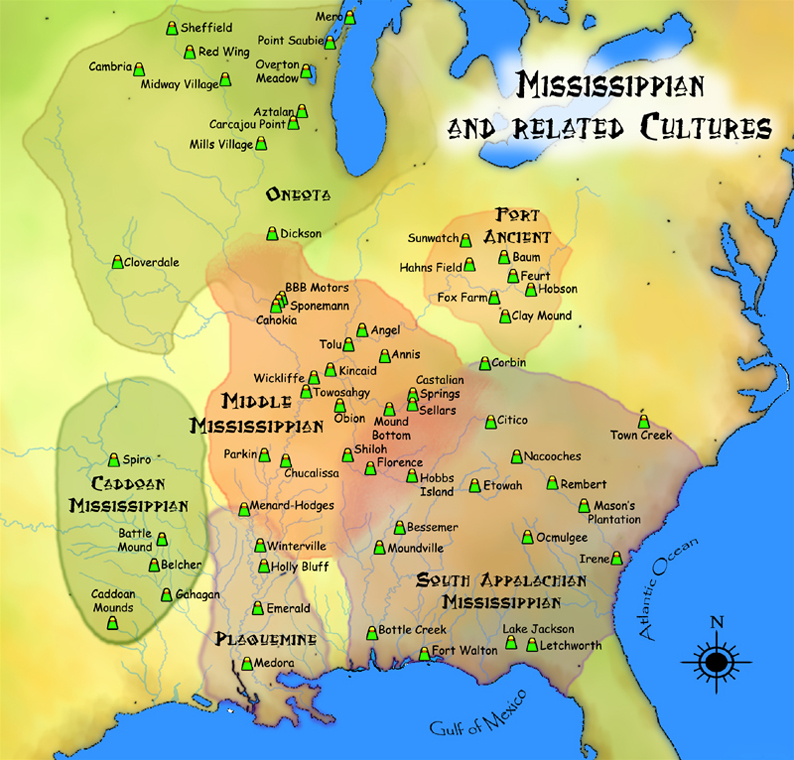
Map: various Mississippian cultures, including the Upper Mississippian culture area of the Oneota, that reached into Minnesota.

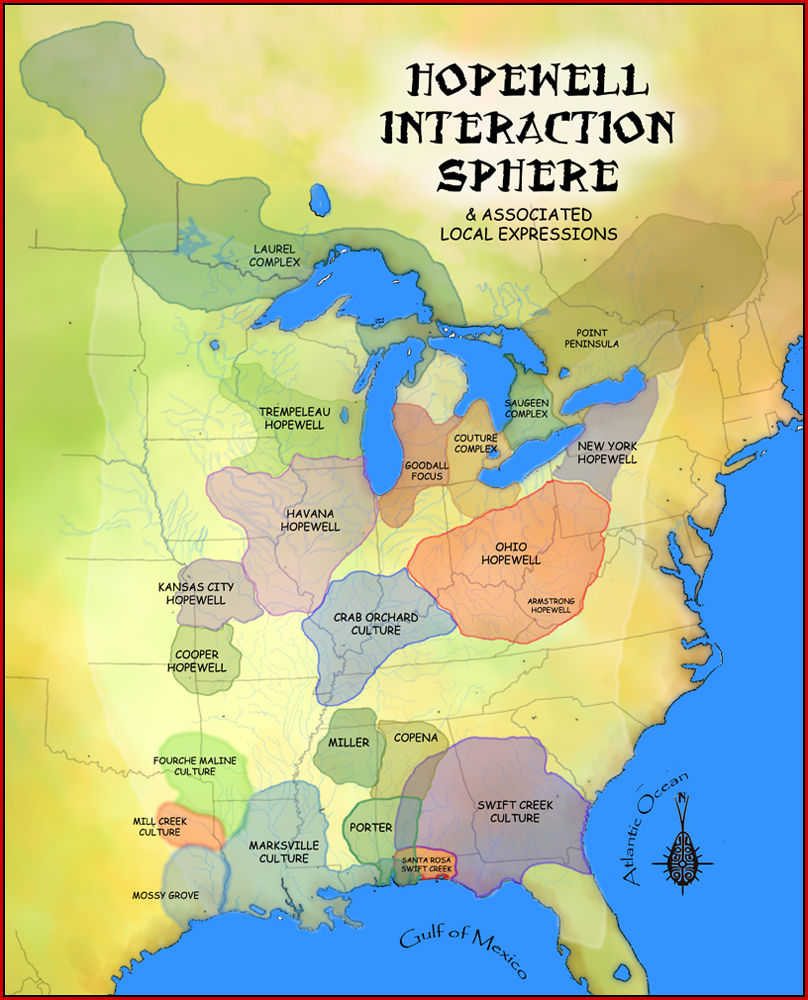
Hopewell tradition - Interaction Area and local expressions of the Hopewell tradition.

== See also ==
- Oneota - Upper Mississippian tradition or culture, in Minnesota.
- Upper Mississippian culture
- Mississippian culture
- Mississippi Valley: Culture, phase, and chronological periods table
- Mdewakanton Sioux
- Jeffers Petroglyphs
- Indian Mounds Park (Saint Paul, Minnesota)
- Pipestone National Monument
- Shakopee Historic District

== Bibliography ==
- Birk, D.:
  - 1974 An Archaeological Investigation of the Painted Rock Cliff Site, Crooked Lake, Lake County, Minnesota. Manuscript on file, Archaeology Department, Minnesota Historical Society, St. Paul.
  - 1991 History Along the River: A Literature Review of the Archaeological Properties at the Little Falls Hydro Reservoir, Morrison County, Minnesota. Institute for Minnesota Archaeology, Reports of Investigations No. 100. Manuscript on file, State Historic Preservation Office, Minnesota Historical Society, St. Paul.
- Birmingham, R.A. and W. Green (editors): *1987 Wisconsin Rock Art. The Wisconsin Archeologist 68:4.
- Bray, E.G. and M.C. Bray (editors): 1976 Joseph N. Nicollet on the Plains and Prairies: The Expeditions of 1838-39 With Journals, Letters, and Notes on the Dakota Indians. Minnesota Historical Society, St. Paul.
- Bray, M.C. (editor): 1970 The Journals of Joseph N, Nicollet: A Scientist on the Mississippi Headwaters with Notes on Indian Life, 1836–37. Translated by Andre Fertey. Minnesota Historical Society, St. Paul.
- Dewdney, S. and K.E. Kidd: 1967 Indian Rock Paintings of the Great Lakes. University of Ontario Press.
- Dobbs, C.A.: 1990 A Phase Two Evaluation of Ancient Native American Sites in Portions of the Spring Creek Valley, City of Red Wing, Goodhue County, Minnesota. Institute for Minnesota Archaeology, Reports of Investigations No. 83. Manuscript on file, State Historic Preservation Office, Minnesota Historical Society, St. Paul.
- Harvey, H.W.: 1944 Some Caves and Pictographs Near the Harvey Rock Shelter. The Minnesota Archaeologist 10(4): 124–128.
- Hudak, G.J.: 1972 Boulder Outlines in Southwestern Minnesota. Plains Anthropologist 17(58):345-346.
- Kehoe, T.F.: 1976 Indian Boulder Effigies, Saskatchewan Museum of Natural History, Popular Series No. 12. Department of Tourism and Renewable Resources, Regina.
- Lewis, T.H.:
  - 1885 Northwestern Archaeological Survey (unpublished field notebook 22). Minnesota Historical Society, St. Paul.
  - 1890a Stone Monuments in Northwestern Iowa and Southwestern Minnesota. American Anthropologist 3:269-274.
  - 1890b Cave Drawings. Appleton's Annual Cyclopaedia and Register of Important Events, 1889 14:117-122.
  - 1898 The Northwestern Archaeological Survey. Published by the author, St. Paul.
- Lothson, G.A.: 1976 The Jeffers Petroglyphs Site: A Survey and Analysis of the Carvings. Minnesota Prehistoric Archaeology Series No. 12. Minnesota Historical Society, St. Paul.
- Lowe, D.:
  - 1987 Rock Art Survey of the Blue Mounds Creek and Mill Creek Drainages in Iowa and Dane Counties, Wisconsin. The Wisconsin Archeologist 68(4):341-375.
  - 1993 Houses of Stone: Rockshelters of Southwestern Wisconsin. Paper presented at the 38th Annual Meeting of the Midwest Archaeological Conference, Milwaukee
- Nicollet, J.N.: 1845 Report Intended to Illustrate A Map of the Hydrographical Basin of the Upper Mississippi River, Document No. 52, Report Submitted to the 28th Congress. Blair and Rives, Washington.
- Rajnovich, G.: 1994 Reading Rock Art. Natural Heritage/Natural History Inc., Toronto.
- Roefer, F., M. English and G. Lothson: 1973 The Jeffers Petroglyphs: A Cultural-Ecological Study. Minnesota Historical Society, St. Paul.
- Salzer, R.J.:
  - 1987a Introduction to Wisconsin Rock Art. The Wisconsin Archeologist 68(4):277-286.
  - 1987b Preliminary Report on the Gottschall Site (47Ia80). The Wisconsin Archeologist 68(4):419-472.
  - 1993 Oral Literature and Archaeology. The Wisconsin Archeologist 74(1-4):80-119.
- Schoolcraft, H.R.: 1966 Travels Through the Northwestern Regions of the United States. E. & E. Hosford, Albany. 1966 reprint of 1821 original, Readex Microprint Corporation.
- Snow, D.R.: 1962 Petroglyphs of Southern Minnesota. The Minnesota Archaeologist 24(4): 102–128.
- Southwick, D.L.: 1981 Letter to Robert Clouse (October 9), County Miscellaneous File (Cottonwood). State Archaeologist's Office, St. Paul.
- Wainwright, I.N.M.: 1990 Rock Painting and Petroglyph Recording Projects in Canada. APT Bulletin 22(1-2):55-84 doi:10.2307/1504273 JSTOR 1504273.
- Winchell, N.H.: 1911 The Aborigines of Minnesota. The Minnesota Historical Society, St. Paul.
- Woolworth, A.R. (editor): 1983 The Red Pipestone Quarry of Minnesota: Archaeological and Historical Reports. The Minnesota Archaeologist 42(1-2).
