= Tolar Petroglyph Site =

- U.S. National Register of Historic Places
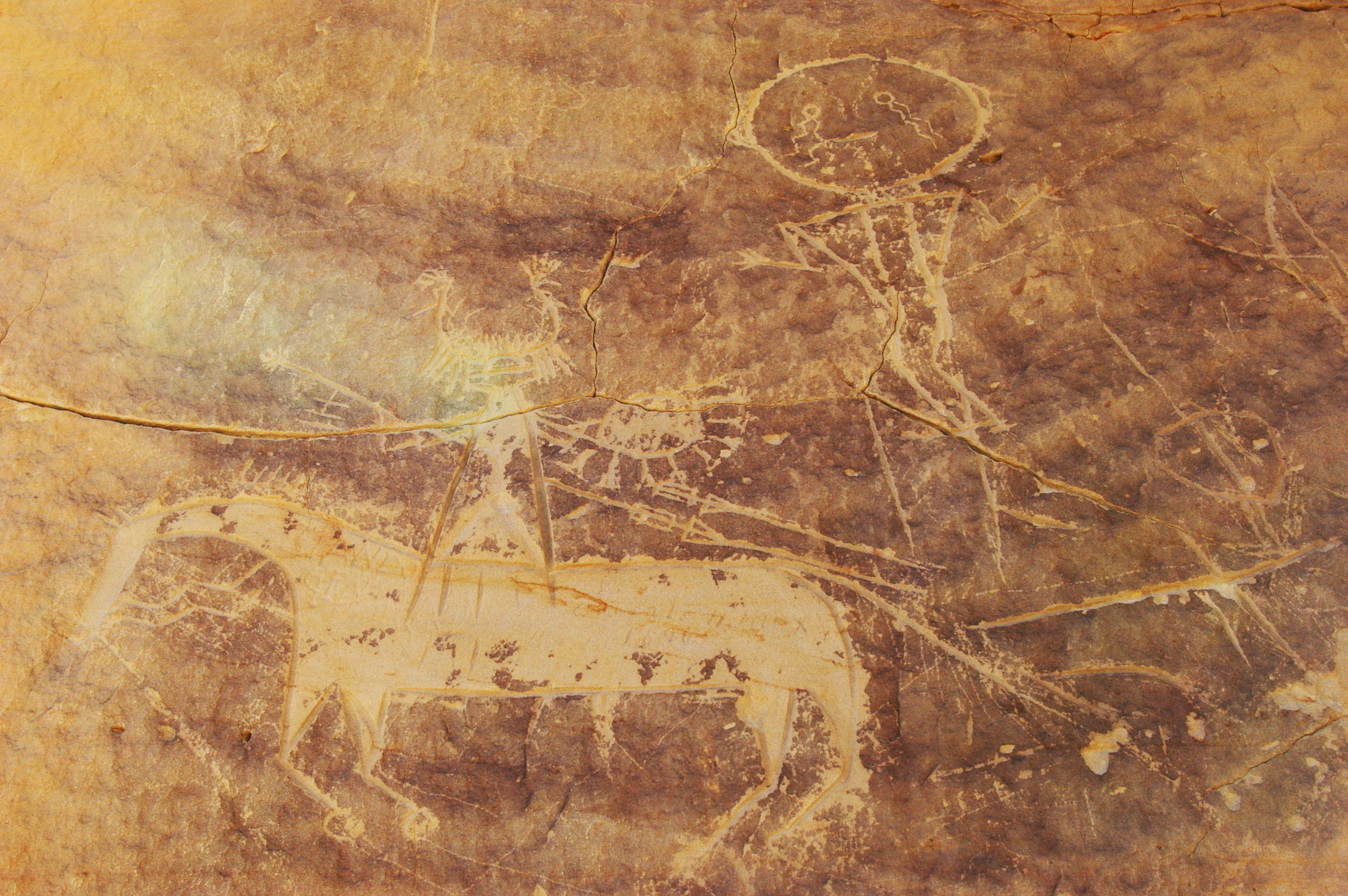
- Nearest city: Point of Rocks, Wyoming
- NRHP reference No.: 14000822
- Added to NRHP: September 30, 2014

The Tolar Petroglyph Site is an archeological site in Sweetwater County, Wyoming. The site includes a sandstone rock formation with 32 panels of petroglyphs running for 150 feet (46 m) along the rock face. Many of the illustrations are of horse-mounted people of the Plains Indians in historical times. Other motifs include the turtle motif, spirit bear and shield-carrying warriors.

The site was placed on the National Register of Historic Places on September 30, 2014.
