= La Barge Bluffs Petroglyphs =

- Como Bluff
- U.S. National Register of Historic Places
- U.S. Historic district
- Location: Address restricted, vicinity of La Barge, Wyoming
- NRHP reference No.: 14000134
- Added to NRHP: April 7, 2014

The La Barge Bluffs Petroglyphs is a historic site which was listed on the National Register of Historic Places in 2014.

The site includes nine panels of petroglyphs along 215 metres (705 ft) of the Green River. The panels show "ancient anthropomorphic and zoomorphic figures, narrative battle and dance scenes and depictions of two locomotives." All of the panels have been affected negatively by graffiti, bullets, and/or other human-caused or natural damage.
