= Christian F. Weinrich House =

Historic house in Illinois, United States

- U.S. National Register of Historic Places
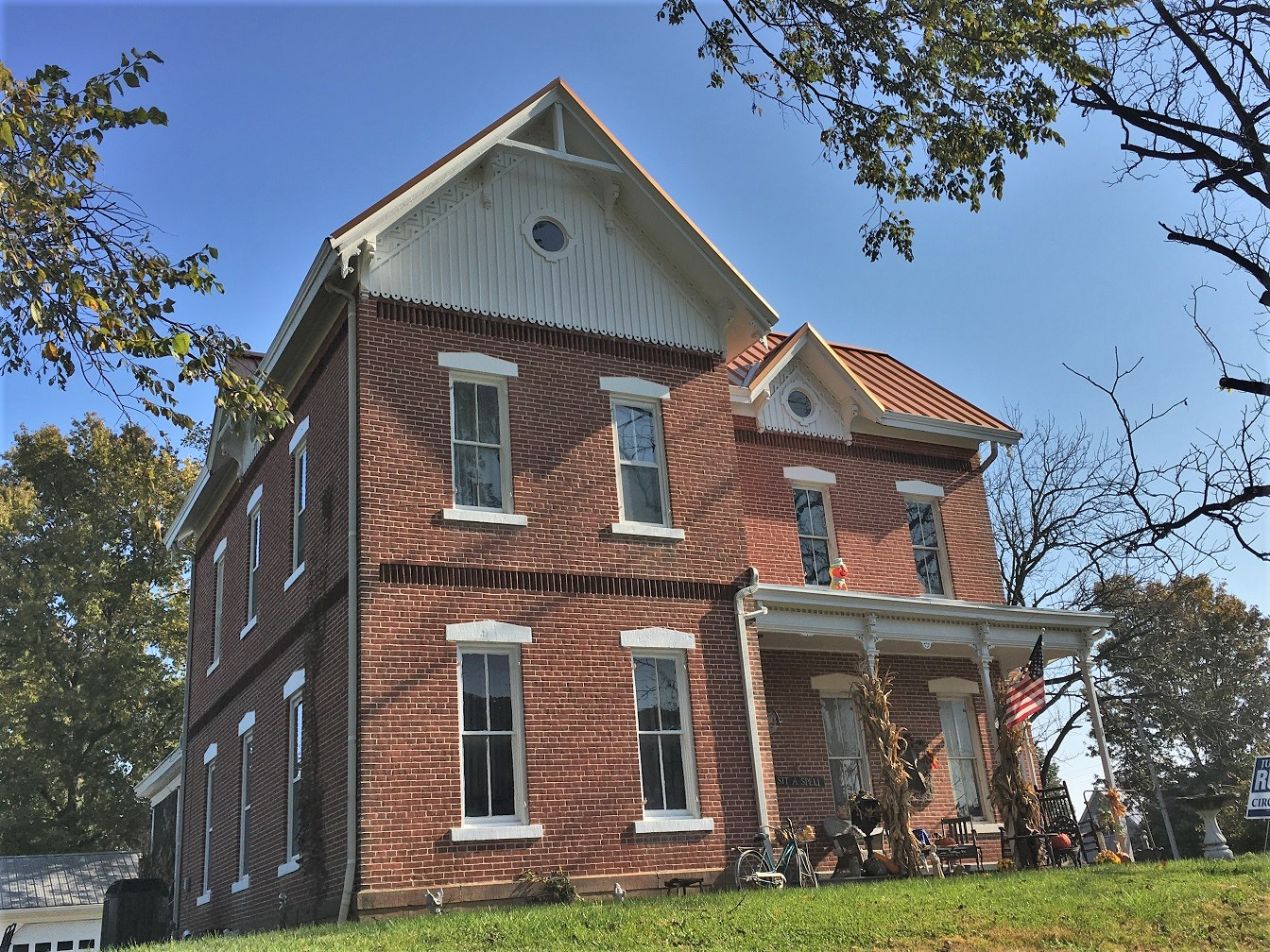

- Location within Illinois Location within the United States
- Location: 217 Opdyke St., Chester, Illinois
- Coordinates: 37°54′39″N 89°49′18″W
- Built: 1873
- Built by: Christian F. Weinrich
- Architectural style: Folk Victorian, Gothic Revival
- NRHP reference No.: 100002572
- Added to NRHP: June 20, 2018

The Christian F. Weinrich House is a historic house at 217 Opdyke Street in Chester, Illinois. The house was built circa 1873 by Christian F. Weinrich, a local merchant who lived in the house with his family until his death in 1913. Weinrich designed the house using elements of the Folk Victorian and Gothic Revival styles. The house's Folk Victorian features include its gable front plan with a side gable and the stickwork on the front-facing gable. While many of its Gothic Revival elements are also Folk Victorian elements, such as its steep roof and decorative wooden porch, its intersecting gables are a characteristic feature of the style.

The house was added to the National Register of Historic Places on June 20, 2018.
