= Modoc, Illinois =

Modoc
- Unincorporated community
- Location of Modoc within Illinois Modoc (the United States)
- Coordinates: 38°03′09″N 90°02′14″W
- Country: United States
- State: Illinois
- County: Randolph County
- Precinct: Brewerville
- Elevation: 397 ft (121 m)
- Time zone: UTC-6 (CST)
  - Summer (DST): UTC-5 (CDT)
- Postal code: 62261
- Area code: 618

Modoc is an unincorporated community in Randolph County, Illinois, United States, located four miles southeast of Prairie du Rocher under the bluffs of the Mississippi River.

The Modoc Rock Shelter, a U.S. National Historic Landmark, is located near Modoc and the Ste. Genevieve-Modoc Ferry across the Mississippi River connects Modoc and the surrounding communities with Ste. Genevieve, Missouri.

Modoc is not a census-designated place. The population of ZIP Code Tabulation Area (ZCTA) 62261, which includes Modoc, was 221 at the 2000 census.

== Geography ==
Modoc is located at 38°3′9″N 90°2′14″W (38.0525522 -90.0373334).

== Demographics ==
As of the 2000 census, there were 221 people, 96 households, and 61 families residing in Modoc's ZIP Code Tabulation Area (ZCTA). The racial makeup was 98.6% White and 1.4% from two or more races.

There were 96 households, out of which 29.2% had children under the age of 18 living with them, 55.2% were married couples living together, 6.3% had a female householder with no husband present, and 36.5% were non-families. 34.4% of all households were made up of individuals living alone, and 11.5% had someone living alone who was 65 years of age or older. The average household size was 2.30 and the average family size was 2.97.

In the ZCTA the population was spread out, with 25.7% under the age of 18, 61.9% from 19 to 64, and 12.4% who were 65 years of age or older. The median age was 41.3 years. The population is 49.8% male and 50.2% female.

The median income for a household in the ZCTA was $34,286, and the median income for a family was $43,558. The per capita income for the ZCTA was $15,081.
