= Old Fire Station (Chester, Illinois) =

- U.S. National Register of Historic Places
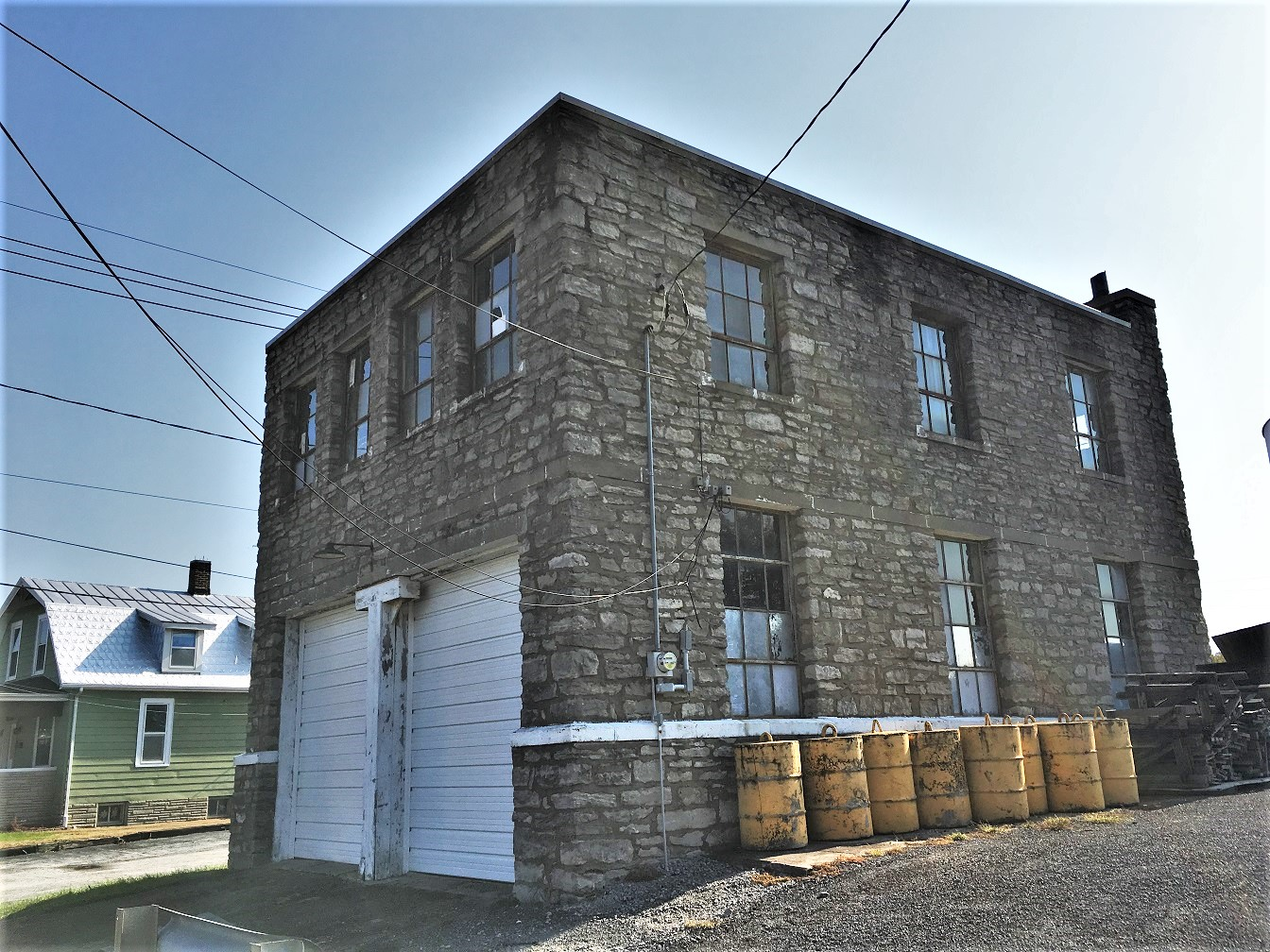

- Location within Illinois Location within the United States
- Location: 822 Swanwick Street, Chester, Illinois
- Coordinates: 37°54′41″N 89°49′31″W
- Built: 1935
- Architect: Theo F. Lacey
- Architectural style: Vernacular
- NRHP reference No.: 100002571
- Added to NRHP: June 15, 2018

The Old Fire Station is a historic fire station at 822 Swanwick Street in Chester, Illinois. The fire station was built in 1935 after the Chester City Council voted to fund a new fire station the previous year. Additional funding came from New Deal programs which promoted public works projects; the Old Fire Station was one of hundreds of new fire stations built nationwide under the New Deal. City engineer Theo F. Lacey designed the building, a vernacular structure built with stone blocks taken from the recently demolished Ballard Building. The fire department used the building until 1961; the second floor was also used as a community center.

The building was added to the National Register of Historic Places on June 15, 2018.
