= Sparta Historic District (Sparta, Illinois) =

Historic district in Illinois, United States

- U.S. National Register of Historic Places
- U.S. Historic district
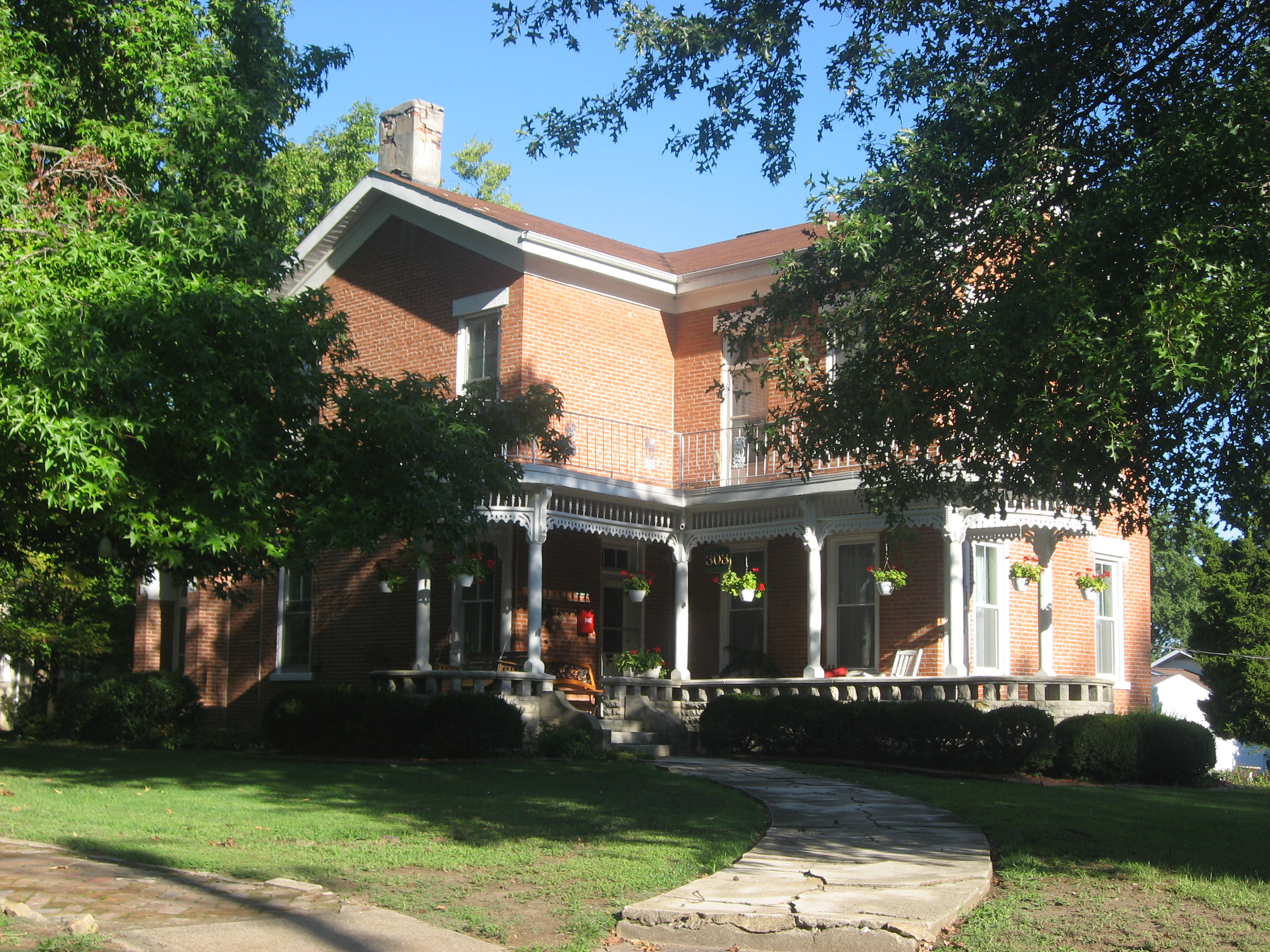
- The Rosborough House, home of the district's developer

- Location within Illinois Location within the United States
- Location: S. St. Louis, W. 3rd and S. James Sts., Sparta, Illinois
- Coordinates: 38°7′11″N 89°42′15″W
- Area: 15 acres (6.1 ha)
- Architectural style: Greek Revival, Late Victorian, Federal, Italianate, Gothic Revival
- NRHP reference No.: 82002595
- Added to NRHP: June 3, 1982

The Sparta Historic District is a residential historic district in Sparta, Illinois. The district consists of fourteen homes in a neighborhood of southern Sparta known as Bricktown. As indicated by the neighborhood's name, all but one of the houses are brick buildings; the remaining house is a wooden Victorian home with a decorative brick chimney. The houses were constructed between 1860 and 1879 and exhibit a variety of architectural styles, including Federal, Gothic Revival, Greek Revival, Italianate, and Victorian. Developer William Rosborough, who lived in the house at 303 West Third Street, planned the district to be an exclusive neighborhood. Rosborough's plans for the district made extensive use of the bricks produced by Sparta's brickmaking industry; in addition to the houses, the neighborhood's streets and sidewalks were originally paved with brick.

The district was added to the National Register of Historic Places on June 3, 1982.
