= Campbell Hill, Illinois =

- Village
- Location of Campbell Hill in Jackson County, Illinois
- Coordinates: 37°55′50″N 89°33′05″W
- Country: United States
- State: Illinois
- County: Jackson
- Township: Bradley

Area
  - Total: 0.46 sq mi (1.20 km^{2})
  - Land: 0.46 sq mi (1.20 km^{2})
  - Water: 0 sq mi (0.00 km^{2})
- Elevation: 554 ft (169 m)

Population (2020)
  - Total: 309
  - Density: 668.3/sq mi (258.03/km^{2})
- Time zone: UTC-6 (CST)
  - Summer (DST): UTC-5 (CDT)
- Zip code: 62916
- Area code: 618
- FIPS code: 17-10773
- GNIS feature ID: 2397544

Campbell Hill is a village in Jackson County, Illinois, United States. The population was 309 at the 2020 census.

== Geography ==
Campbell Hill is located in northwestern Jackson County. Illinois Route 4 runs through the northeast side of the village, leading northwest 4.5 miles (7.2 km) to Willisville and southeast 4 miles (6 km) to Ava. Murphysboro, the Jackson county seat, is 19 miles (31 km) southeast of Campbell Hill.

According to the 2021 census gazetteer files, Campbell Hill has a total area of 0.46 square miles (1.19 km^{2}), of which 0.46 square miles (1.19 km^{2}) (or 99.78%) is land and 0.00 square miles (0.00 km^{2}) (or 0.22%) is water.

== Demographics ==
Historical population
Census	Pop.	Note	%±
1880	214		—
1890	280		30.8%
1900	497		77.5%
1910	414		−16.7%
1920	366		−11.6%
1930	330		−9.8%
1940	401		21.5%
1950	336		−16.2%
1960	263		−21.7%
1970	300		14.1%
1980	389		29.7%
1990	351		−9.8%
2000	333		−5.1%
2010	336		0.9%
2020	309		−8.0%
U.S. Decennial Census

As of the 2020 census there were 309 people, 126 households, and 82 families residing in the village. The population density was 667.39 inhabitants per square mile (257.68/km^{2}). There were 144 housing units at an average density of 311.02 per square mile (120.09/km^{2}). The racial makeup of the village was 96.44% White, 0.00% African American, 0.00% Native American, 0.00% Asian, 0.00% Pacific Islander, 0.00% from other races, and 3.56% from two or more races. Hispanic or Latino of any race were 0.32% of the population.

There were 126 households, out of which 30.2% had children under the age of 18 living with them, 46.83% were married couples living together, 11.90% had a female householder with no husband present, and 34.92% were non-families. 32.54% of all households were made up of individuals, and 13.49% had someone living alone who was 65 years of age or older. The average household size was 2.89 and the average family size was 2.32.

The village's age distribution consisted of 24.3% under the age of 18, 8.6% from 18 to 24, 26.4% from 25 to 44, 19.5% from 45 to 64, and 21.2% who were 65 years of age or older. The median age was 36.7 years. For every 100 females, there were 74.9 males. For every 100 females age 18 and over, there were 85.7 males.

The median income for a household in the village was $58,125, and the median income for a family was $60,556. Males had a median income of $50,179 versus $20,938 for females. The per capita income for the village was $26,327. About 8.5% of families and 10.3% of the population were below the poverty line, including 21.1% of those under age 18 and 1.6% of those age 65 or over.

== Education ==
It is in the Trico Community Unit School District 176.

== Notable people ==
- Bucky Bockhorn, professional basketball player
- Dean Ehlers, college basketball coach
