= Piney Creek Ravine State Natural Area =

State park in Illinois, USA

- IUCN category V (protected landscape/seascape)
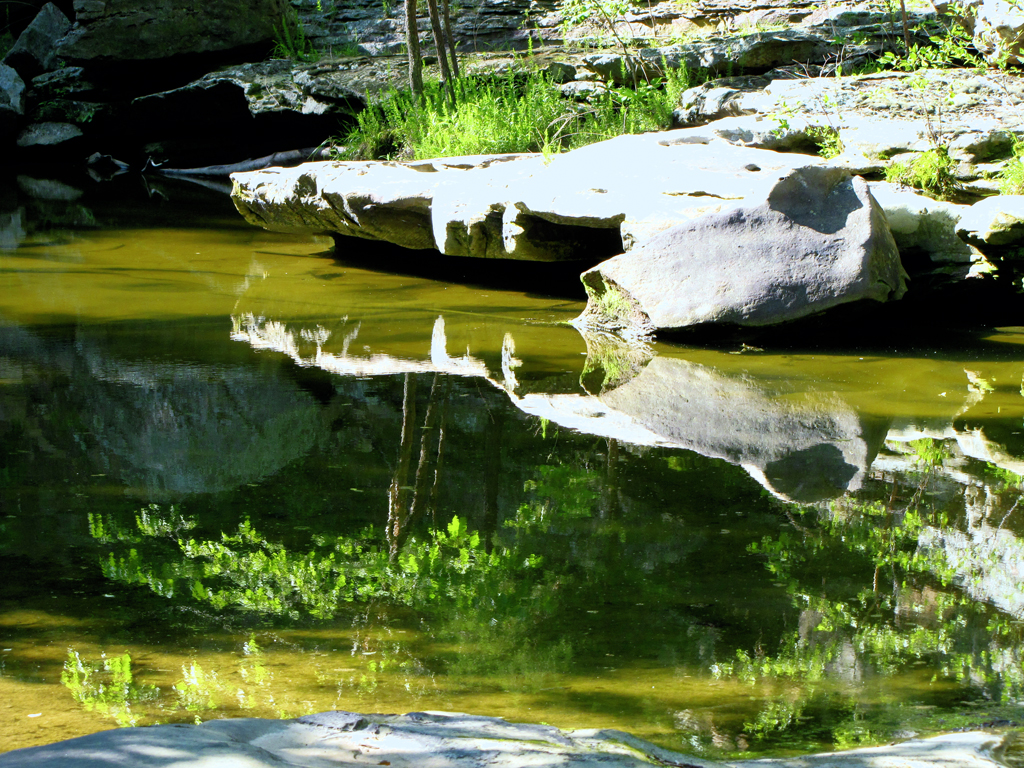
- Piney Creek Ravine

- Location within Illinois Location within the United States
- Location: Jackson and Randolph Counties, Illinois, USA
- Nearest city: Steeleville, Illinois
- Coordinates: 37°53′56″N 89°38′14″W
- Area: 198 acres (80 ha)
- Established: 1972
- Governing body: Illinois Department of Natural Resources

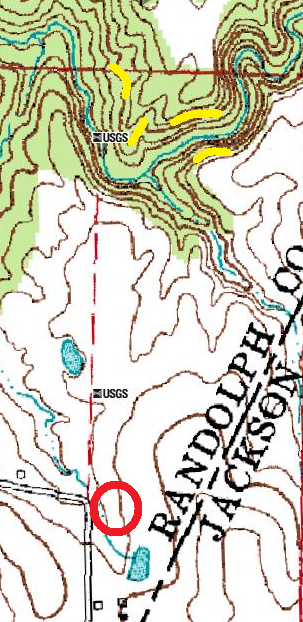
Site locations at Piney Creek: the red circle is the parking area, and the yellow spots are petroglyph sites.

Piney Creek Ravine State Natural Area is an Illinois state park on 198 acres (80 ha) in Jackson and Randolph Counties, Illinois, United States.

One cliff face in the ravine contains several Native American petroglyphs, along with modern graffiti, which was added to the National Register of Historic Places in 2001.
