= List of elections in 1818 =

The following elections occurred in the year 1818.

== North America ==
=== United States ===
- 1818 United States elections

==== United States lieutenant gubernatorial ====
- 1818 Connecticut lieutenant gubernatorial election
- 1818 Illinois lieutenant gubernatorial election

==== United States gubernatorial ====
- 1818 Connecticut gubernatorial election
- 1818 Illinois gubernatorial election
- 1818 Maryland gubernatorial election
- 1818 Massachusetts gubernatorial election
- 1818 New Hampshire gubernatorial election
- 1818 New Jersey gubernatorial election
- 1818 North Carolina gubernatorial election
- 1818 Ohio gubernatorial election
- 1818 Rhode Island gubernatorial election
- 1818 South Carolina gubernatorial election
- 1818 Vermont gubernatorial election
- 1818 Virginia gubernatorial election

==== United States Senate ====
- 1818 and 1819 United States Senate elections
- 1818 United States Senate election in Pennsylvania

==== United States House of Representatives ====
- 1818 and 1819 United States House of Representatives elections
- 1818 United States House of Representatives election in Delaware
- 1818 United States House of Representatives election in Georgia
- 1818 United States House of Representatives election in Illinois
- 1818 United States House of Representatives election in Indiana
- 1818 United States House of Representatives elections in Kentucky
- 1818 United States House of Representatives election in Louisiana
- 1818 United States House of Representatives elections in Maryland
- 1818 United States House of Representatives elections in Massachusetts
- 1818 Massachusetts's 5th congressional district special election
- 1818 Massachusetts's 11th congressional district special election
- 1818 United States House of Representatives election in Mississippi
- 1818 United States House of Representatives election in New Hampshire
- 1818 New Jersey's at-large congressional district special election
- 1818 United States House of Representatives election in New Jersey
- 1818 United States House of Representatives elections in New York
- 1818 New York's 15th congressional district special election
- 1818 United States House of Representatives elections in North Carolina
- 1818 United States House of Representatives elections in Ohio
- 1818 United States House of Representatives elections in Pennsylvania
- 1818 Pennsylvania's 9th congressional district special election
- 1818 United States House of Representatives election in Rhode Island
- 1818 United States House of Representatives elections in South Carolina
- 1818 United States House of Representatives election in Vermont
- 1818 Virginia's 15th congressional district special election

== Europe ==
=== United Kingdom ===
- 1818 United Kingdom general election

== See also ==
- Category:1818 elections
