= Pierre Menard House =

Historic house in Illinois, United States

Coordinates: 37.9647°N 89.9099°W

- U.S. National Register of Historic Places
- U.S. National Historic Landmark
- Illinois State Historic Site
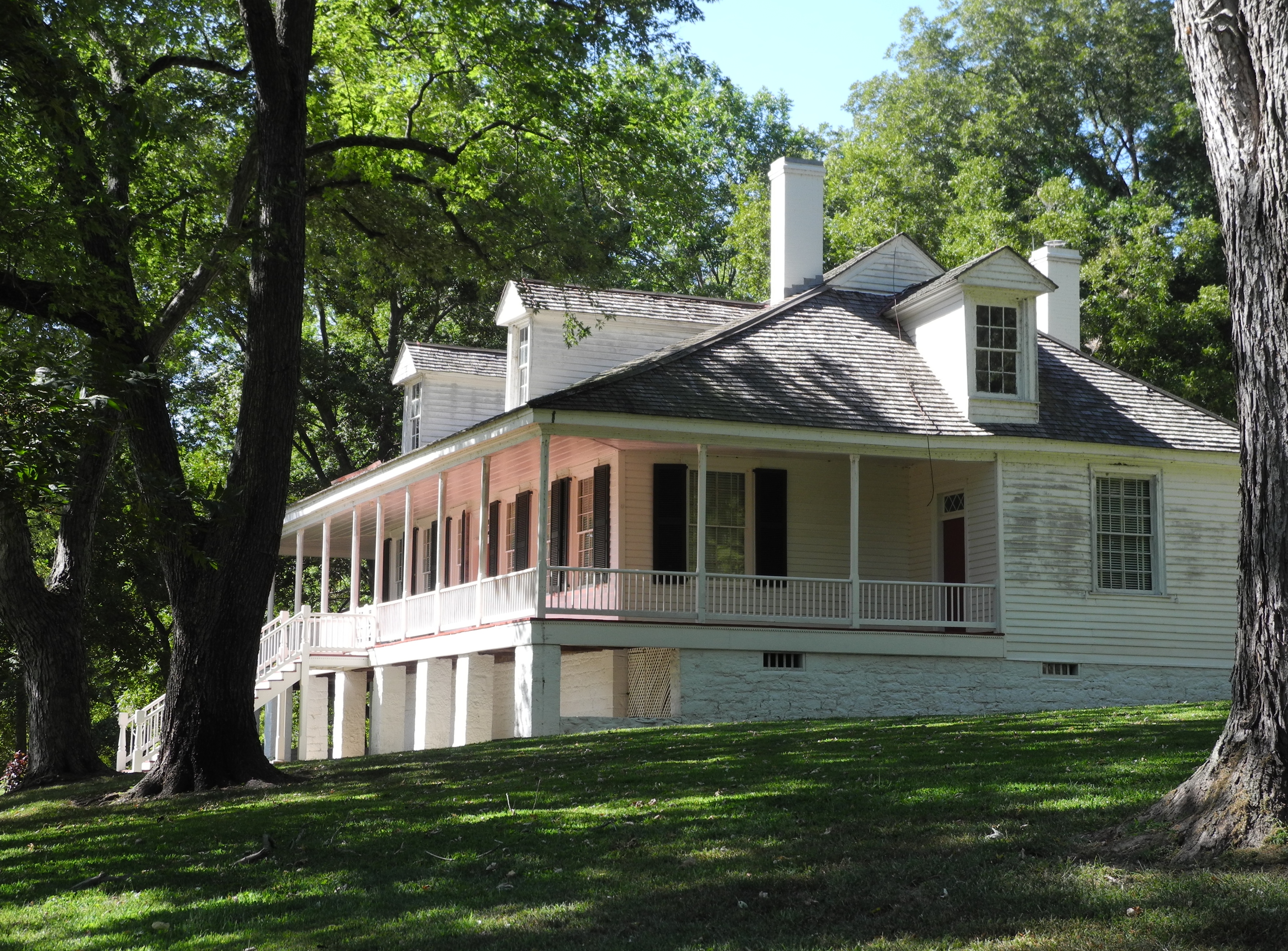
- Pierre Menard House

- Location within Illinois Location within the United States
- Location: 4230 Kaskaskia St, Ellis Grove, Illinois
- Nearest city: Kaskaskia, Illinois
- Built: 1802
- Architect: Joseph Champaigne
- Architectural style: Colonial
- Part of: French Colonial Historic District (ID74000772)
- NRHP reference No.: 70000245

Significant dates
- Added to NRHP: April 15, 1970
- Designated NHL: April 15, 1970

The Pierre Menard House, located in Ellis Grove, Illinois, United States, was the home of Pierre Menard, a trader who became the first lieutenant governor of Illinois from 1818 to 1822.

== History ==
Pierre Menard was born near Montreal, Quebec on October 7, 1766. The third of ten children, Menard sought to make his fortune by trading furs in what was then "Illinois Country". Leaving his home in Canada with two of his brothers at approximately the age of 15, he worked for Francois Vigo of Vincennes, IN as a clerk moving to Kaskaskia in March 1790. Having become a successful businessman by the age of thirty, Menard went on to become a successful U.S. political figure, eventually becoming the first lieutenant governor of Illinois, after having served as the presiding officer of the Illinois Territorial Legislature. Despite his various political accolades, including delegate to the Indiana Territorial Legislature, regimental Major, and being one of the select few chosen to help draft Illinois' first constitution, Pierre Menard is still remembered to this day for his good-natured will and for his generosity towards the poor.

The land was purchased sometime in 1802 according to records and family and the house itself construction began sometime later that year. It is an illustration of the Southern French Colonial (sometimes referred to as "Creole") and has various features which highlight this, including its beautiful Gallery (porch). The house is located within only a few hundred yards of the Mississippi River which during Pierre's time would have been the Kaskaskia River. Due to the annual flooding and erosion, the rest of the original town of Kaskaskia, Illinois' first capital, has been washed away. The Pierre Menard House now stands as the only testament to where the first state capital once stood in its original place. Preserved by the state as the Pierre Menard Home State Historic Site, it contains a museum which includes audio-visual program. The museum is devoted to the Menard family, as well as local history, and is governed by the Illinois Department of Natural Resources. The house was added to the National Register of Historic Places and designated a National Historic Landmark in 1970, and it was named one of the contributing properties to the new French Colonial Historic District in 1974, along with other area French-influenced sites such as Fort de Chartres, the Creole House, the Kolmer Site (a former Indian village), and the site of Fort Kaskaskia.

== Interior ==
The two-story home features early 19th-century period furnishings. The rooms on the main floor include the entry hall, parlor, master bedroom, dining room, two additional bedrooms, maid's room and a nursery. Behind the home is a period stone kitchen. The grounds include a privy, a reconstructed smokehouse and springhouse, and a historic herb and vegetable garden.

== Grounds and History of slaves ==
The house and museum doesn't describe or mention the history of slaves on this plantation. In 1999, Christopher Stratton and William Flesher conducted an archaeological investigation to recreate where the slave quarters existed. The total number of slaves swelled from 7 in 1810 to 22 in 1830. They remained slaves on the property until Illinois abolished slavery in 1848.

Pierre Menard was one of only three people with a statue on the grounds of the Illinois state capitol in Springfield. August 19, 2020, the Speaker of the House and office of architecture removed this Menard's statue from the grounds because it led to "Memorializing people and a time that allowed slavery and fostered bigotry and oppression has no place in the Illinois House, where the work of all Illinoisans is conducted," according to Speaker Michael Madigan.

== Gallery ==
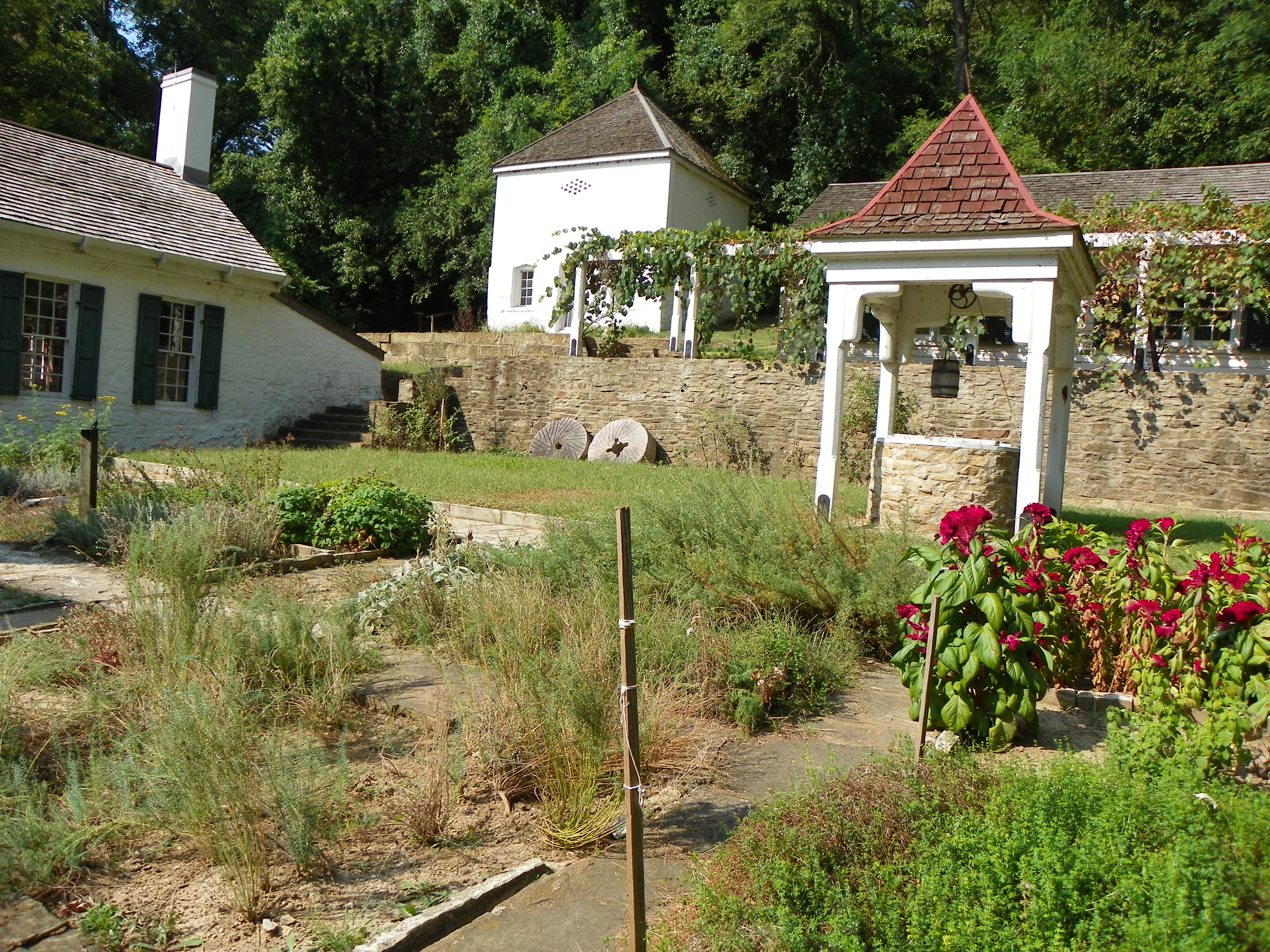
Garden

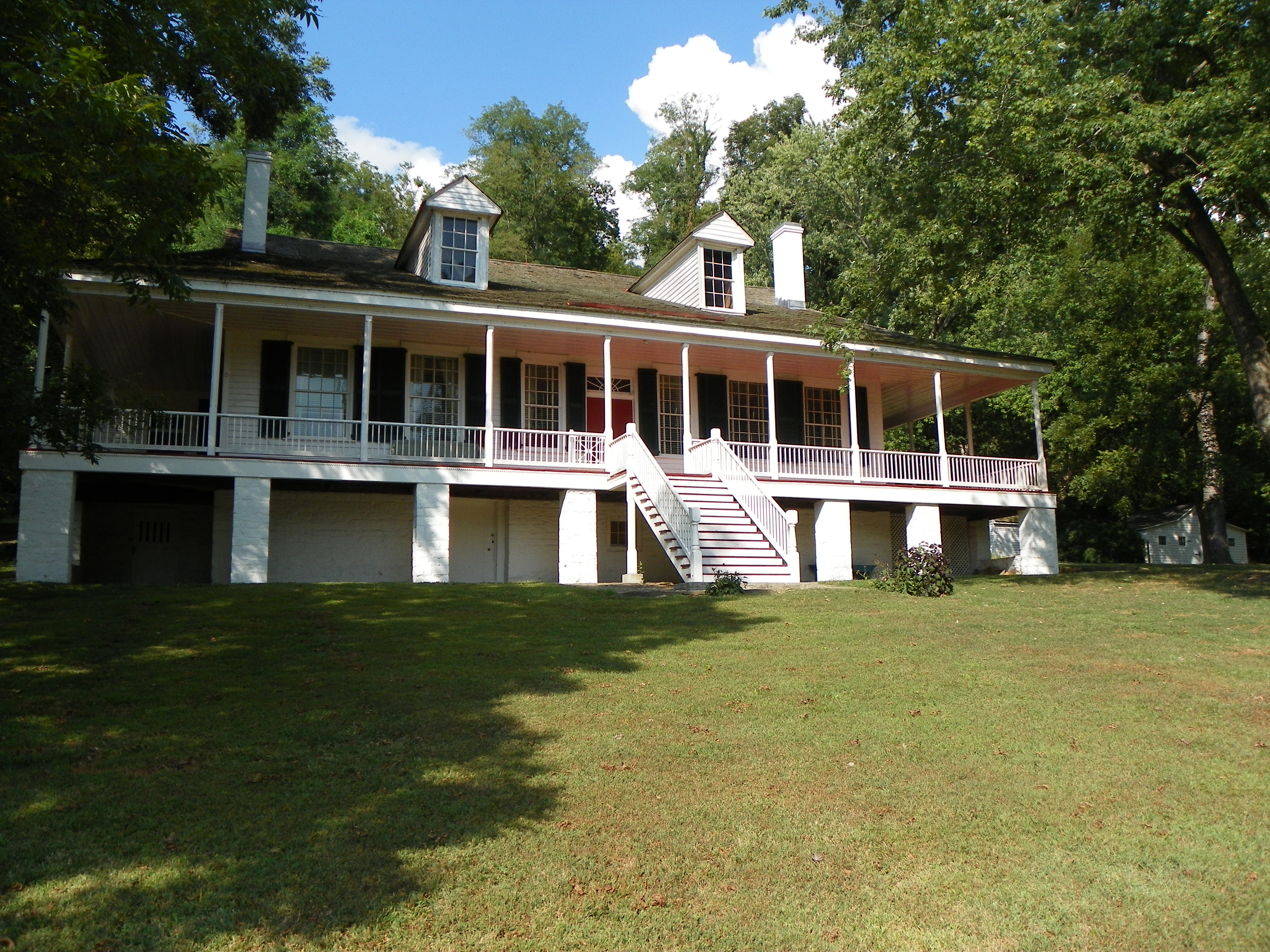
Front

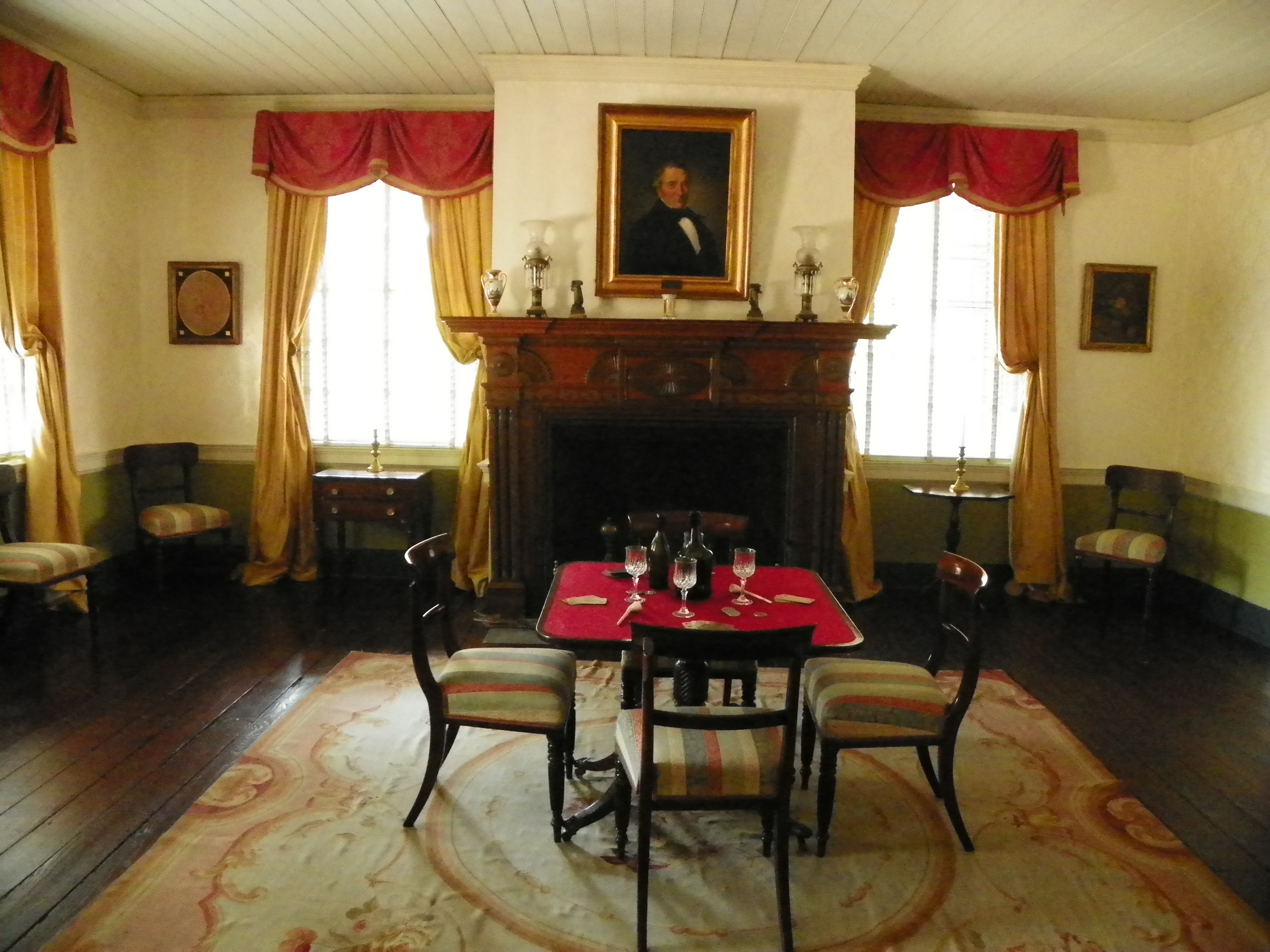
Sitting Room
