= Illinois Route 155 =

State highway in Randolph County, Illinois, US

Illinois Route 155
- IL 155 highlighted in red

Route information
- Maintained by IDOT
- Length: 10.81 mi (17.40 km)
- Existed: 1924–present

Major junctions
- West end: Fort de Chartres State Historical Site in Prairie du Rocher
- East end: IL 3 in Ruma

Location
- Country: United States
- State: Illinois
- Counties: Randolph

Highway system
- Illinois State Highway System; Interstate; US; State; Tollways; Scenic
← I-155	→ IL 156

Illinois Route 155 is an east–west state highway in southwestern Illinois. It runs from Fort de Chartres – outside of Prairie du Rocher – to Illinois Route 3 in Ruma. This is a distance of approximately 10.81 miles (17.40 km).

== Route description ==
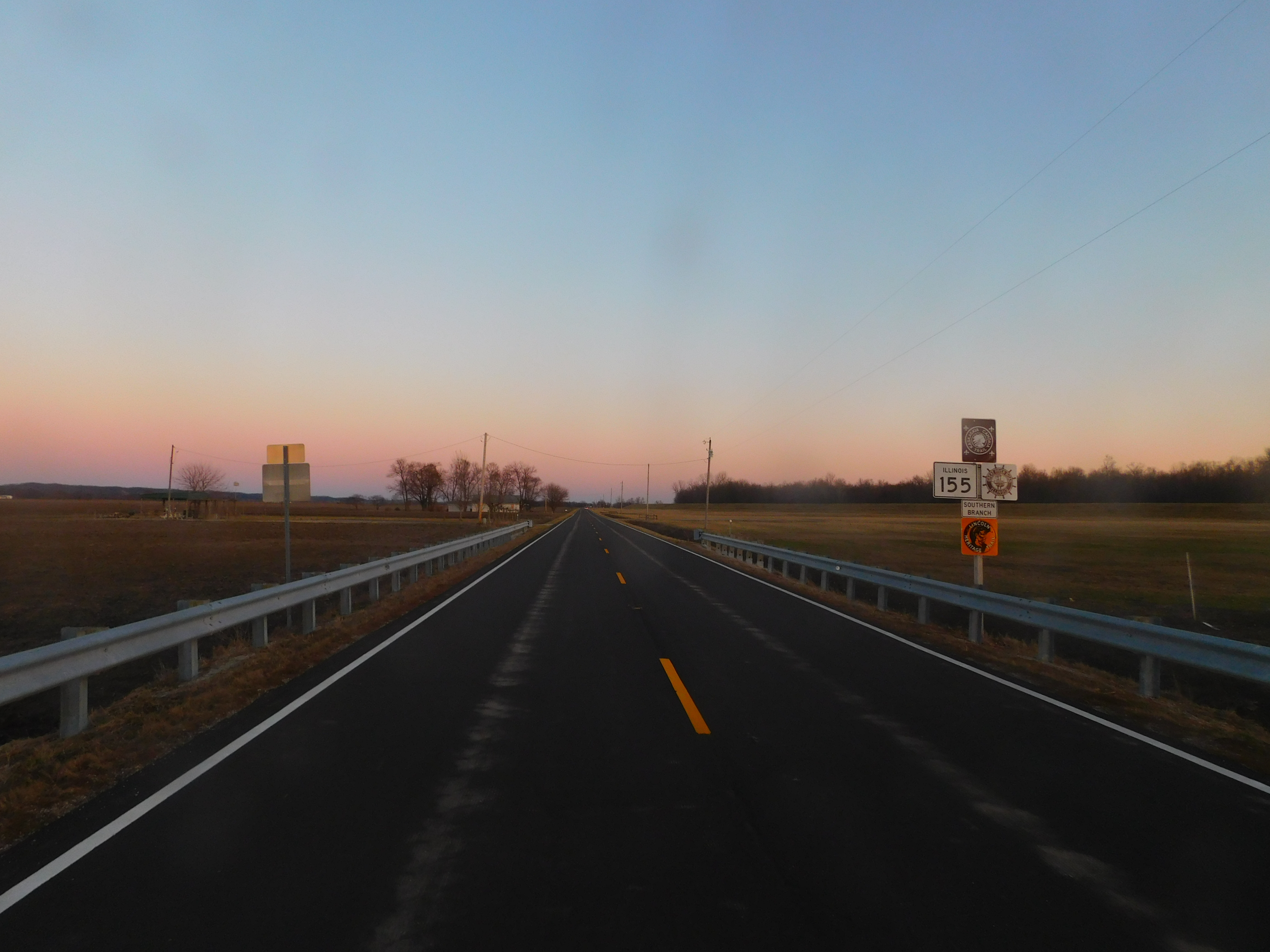
IL 155 at Fort de Chartres

Illinois 155 serves as a spur from Illinois Route 3 through Prairie du Rocher and on to Fort de Chartres. It is recognized as a spur of the Great River Road. It is also part of the Lincoln Heritage Trail. Illinois 155 is a two-lane road from Fort de Chartres all the way to Illinois 3.

== History ==
Illinois Route 155 was established in 1924 with the second batch of SBI routes. Its route has not changed since 1924.

== Major intersections ==
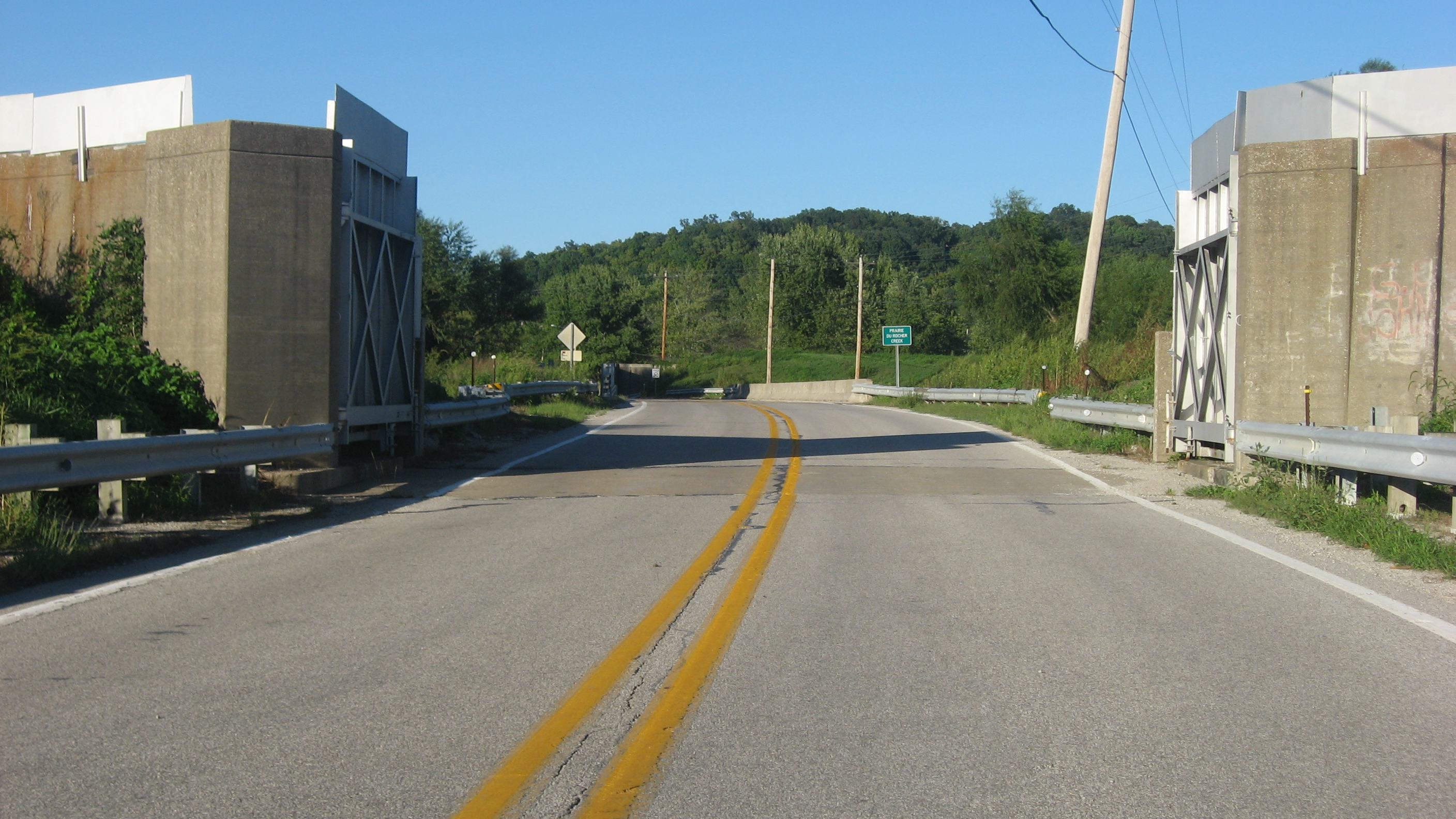
Heading north through a gate in the Prairie du Rocher floodwall

The entire route is in Randolph County.

Location	mi	km	Destinations	Notes
	0.00	0.00	Fort de Chartres State Historical Site	
Ruma	10.81	17.40	IL 3 / Great River Road	
1.000 mi = 1.609 km; 1.000 km = 0.621 mi
