= Kolmer Site =

Archaeological site in Illinois, United States

- U.S. National Register of Historic Places
- U.S. Historic district – Contributing property
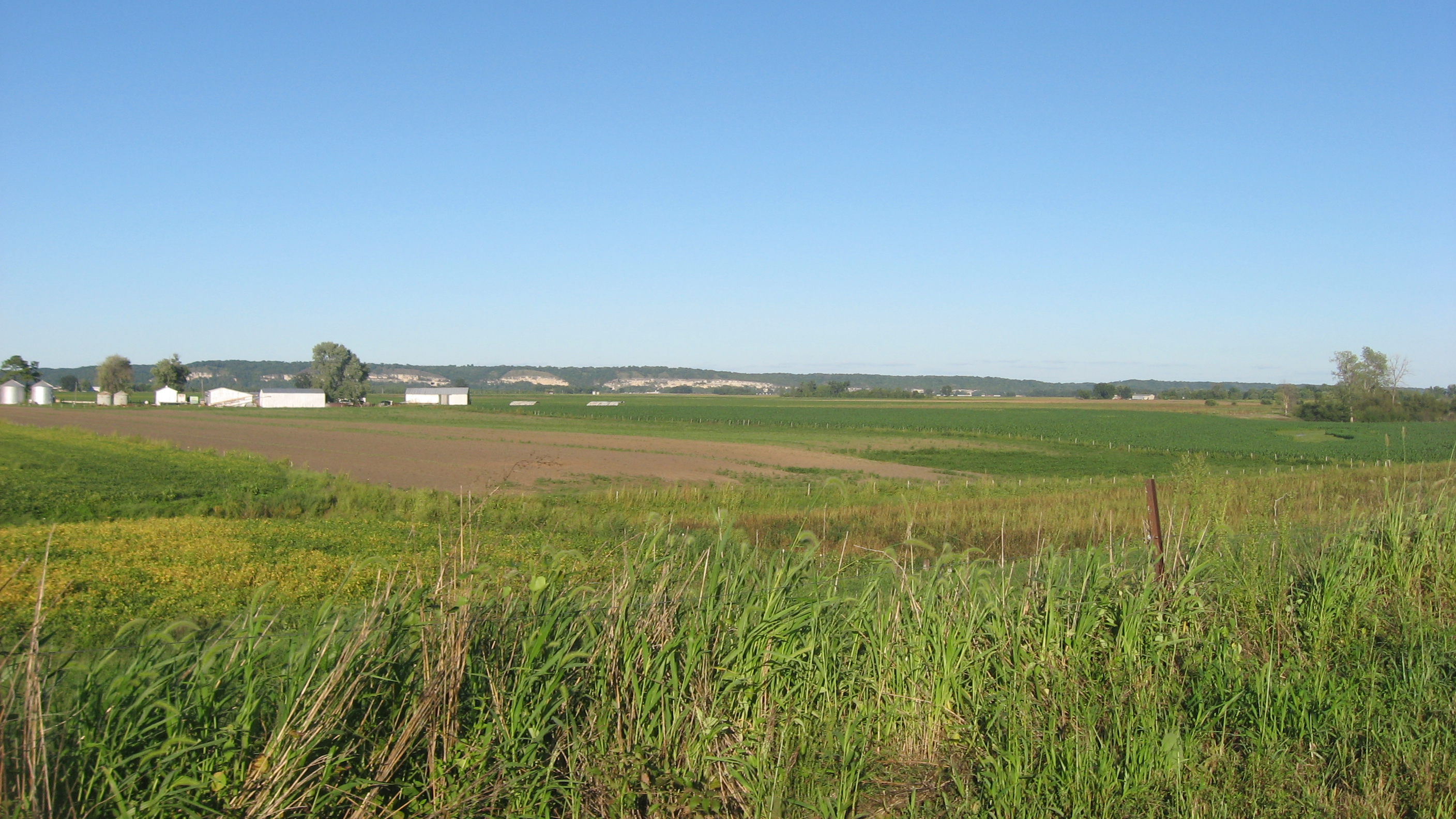
- Overview of the site from the west

- Location within Illinois Location within the United States
- Location: Levee Rd., west of Fort Chartres State Park
- Nearest city: Prairie du Rocher, Illinois
- Coordinates: 38°5′30″N 90°10′51″W
- Area: 89 acres (36 ha)
- Built: 1720
- Part of: French Colonial Historic District (ID74000772)
- NRHP reference No.: 74000773
- Added to NRHP: May 1, 1974

The Kolmer Site is an archaeological site in the far southwest of the U.S. state of Illinois. Located near Kaskaskia and Prairie du Rocher in western Randolph County, it lies at the site of an early historic Indian village from the French period. Because it occupies a critical chronological and cultural position, it has been given national recognition as a historic site.

== Historical events ==
Under René-Robert Cavelier, Sieur de La Salle, the Mississippi and Ohio Rivers were discovered and explored for the first time, and claimed as part of New France. The earliest explorers were followed by Catholic Christian missionaries led by Jacques Gravier, who soon won converts among the Illini, and some of these praying Indians founded riverside villages at Cahokia, Kaskaskia, and Peoria. These villages were small by modern standards, although they remained comparable in size to European settlements in the area; according to letters by one missionary written in 1750, three Illini villages in the American Bottom together numbered fewer than eight hundred inhabitants, while the five French villages in the same region comprised eleven hundred Frenchmen and three hundred blacks.

Established in 1720, the village at the present Kolmer Site was inhabited by a subgroup of the Illini known as the Michigamea. Here the flickering light of civilization grew for little more than thirty years before it was unexpectedly snuffed out: in 1752, a confederation of the Fox, Sioux, and Cherokees came up against the village suddenly, and although it had been fortified with a stockade, the inhabitants were unable to hold off the invaders. Many were savagely killed, and numerous others were captured, and the survivors fled to Kaskaskia. The invaders withdrew, but only after burning the abandoned village; instead of rebuilding their destroyed homes, the Michigamea established a new village nearby at a location known to modern archaeologists as the Waterman Site.

French dominion in the American Bottom ended with the Treaty of Paris in 1763, by which all lands east of the Mississippi were ceded to the Kingdom of Great Britain. British dominion, in turn, was ended by the American Revolution: while the French settlers and local Indians were initially favorable toward the British, skillful manoeuvering by George Rogers Clark won the support of both populations for the Americans. The influence of the Catholic faith may have waned by this time, as Clark addressed the inhabitants of Kaskaskia and Cahokia using traditional religious terms instead of Christian words, and by the early nineteenth century Kaskaskia was home to numerous Protestant churches, such as the Episcopalians, the Baptists, and the Reformed Presbyterians. Nevertheless, the Kolmer residents' church endured: the parish of the Immaculate Conception in Kaskaskia survived the great nineteenth-century flood that saw the Mississippi abandon its banks and leave Kaskaskia an island on the western side of the river, and although the village had fallen to a population of fourteen by the time of the 2010 census, Mass is still celebrated at the church weekly.

== Archaeological significance ==
When the Michigamea lived at the Kolmer Site, it sat on the riverbank along the Mississippi, but subsequent course changes have stranded the site from the river: it now lies a full mile (more than 1.5 km) away from the shoreline, behind the levee system that has been built to keep the river in its banks. Now used for agricultural purposes, the soil is a mixture of sandy humus and gumbo. The area's original character has been well preserved, mainly due to the lack of modern development that it has experienced. Because of the suddenness of the attack that destroyed the village in 1752, the Michigamea are believed to have abandoned most of their possessions, and because they established a new village rather than restoring the old, it is likely that most artifacts that survived the village's burning yet remain in situ. For these reasons, Kolmer is significant for its potential to yield information about the late Illini period. Still, its importance is greatly expanded because of its inhabitants' relationship with the French. As original artifacts from the site must be dated within a third of a century, comparing Kolmer artifacts with artifacts from other French-influenced sites would enable archaeologists to understand previously undated sites. At the same time, the significant changes inherent in the transition from a nomadic lifestyle to European-influenced civilization are also likely to appear in the site's artifacts. Finally, as the Kolmer Site was intimately connected to the most prominent French settlements in the upper Mississippi valley, it is a critical component of a region without parallel in the United States for its preservation of colonial France, especially as the larger village of old Kaskaskia has lain under the Mississippi River since its course changed.

== Historic designation ==
In the spring of 1974, the Kolmer Site was listed on the National Register of Historic Places in two different ways. It was individually added to the Register in early May, qualifying because of its archaeological significance, while one month previously, it had been added as part of a large historic district. This French Colonial Historic District preserves 22 square miles (57 km^{2}) of land connected to early French settlement in the region, and the Kolmer Site was named one of its most significant contributing properties. Among the other contributing properties are truly ancient sites such as the Modoc Rock Shelter and important French or French-influenced structures such as the Creole House, the Pierre Menard House, Fort de Chartres, and the site of Fort Kaskaskia, as well as the Waterman Site where the Michigamea lived after their first village was razed.

== See also ==
- List of archaeological sites on the National Register of Historic Places in Illinois
- Cahokia
- Grand Village of the Illinois, a significant village site in northern Illinois
