= Fort Kaskaskia State Historic Site =

- Fort Kaskaskia SHS
- U.S. Historic district – Contributing property
- Illinois State Historic Site
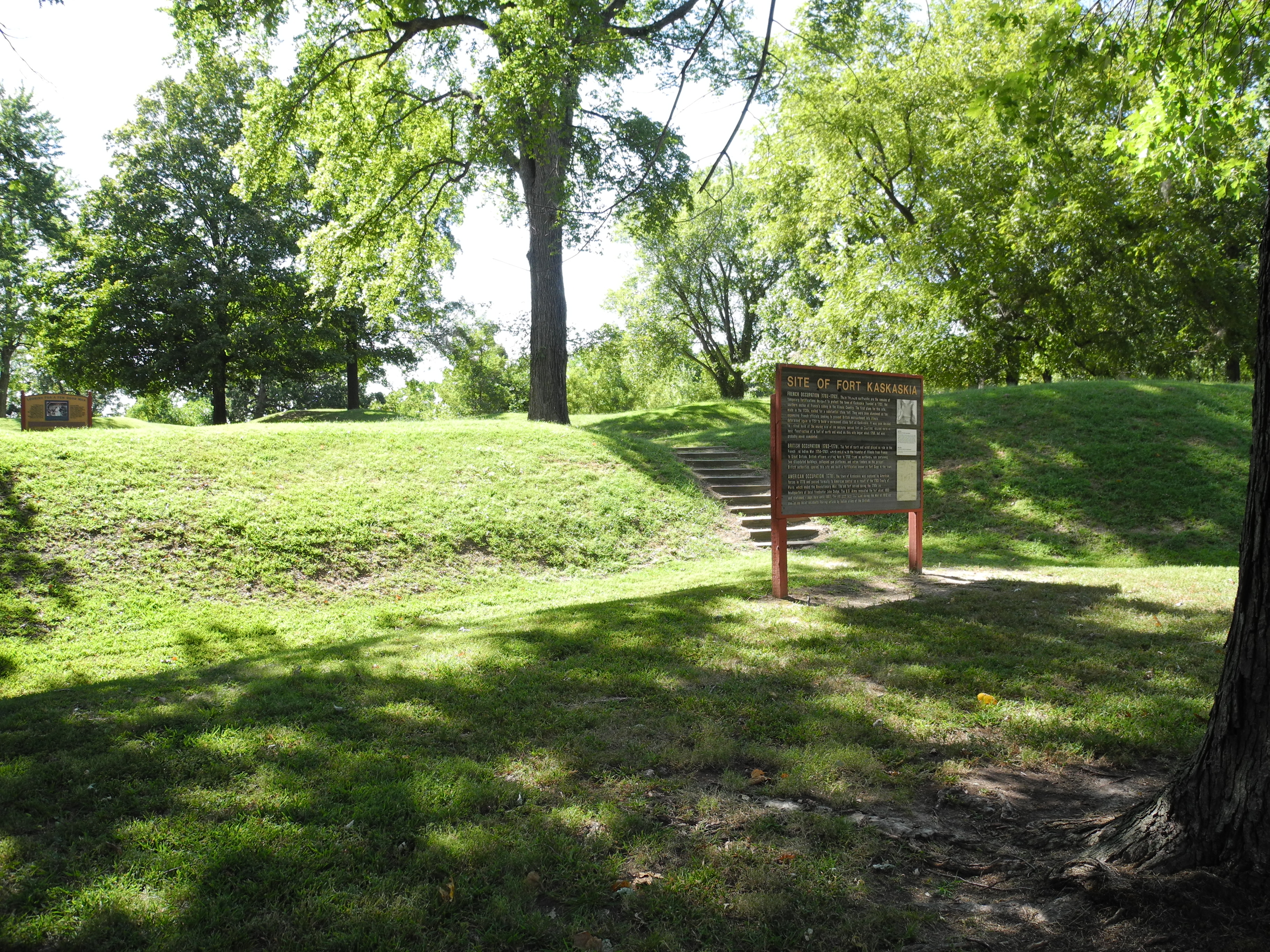
- Eroded ramparts of Fort Kaskaska

- Location within Illinois Location within the United States
- Location: County Roads 3 and 6, west of Chester, Illinois
- Coordinates: 37°58′8″N 89°54′38″W
- Built: 1754
- Part of: French Colonial Historic District (ID74000772)
- Added to NRHP: April 3, 1974

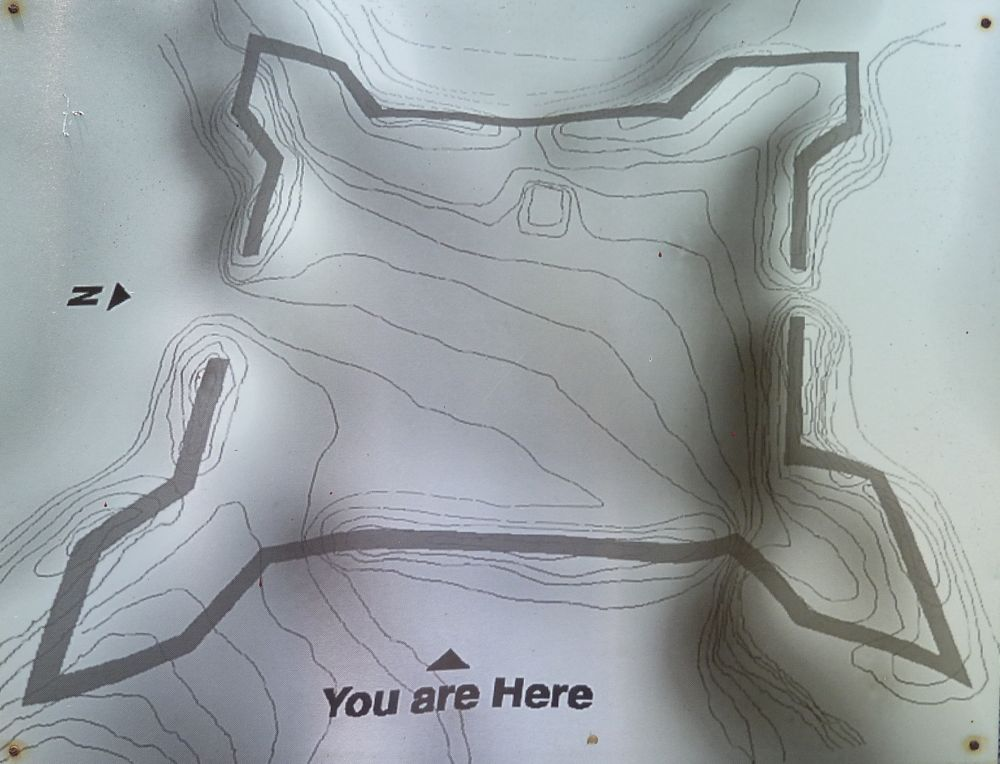
Topographic map of Fort Kaskaskia showing the boundary of the redoubt earthworks and the entrance and exit of the fort

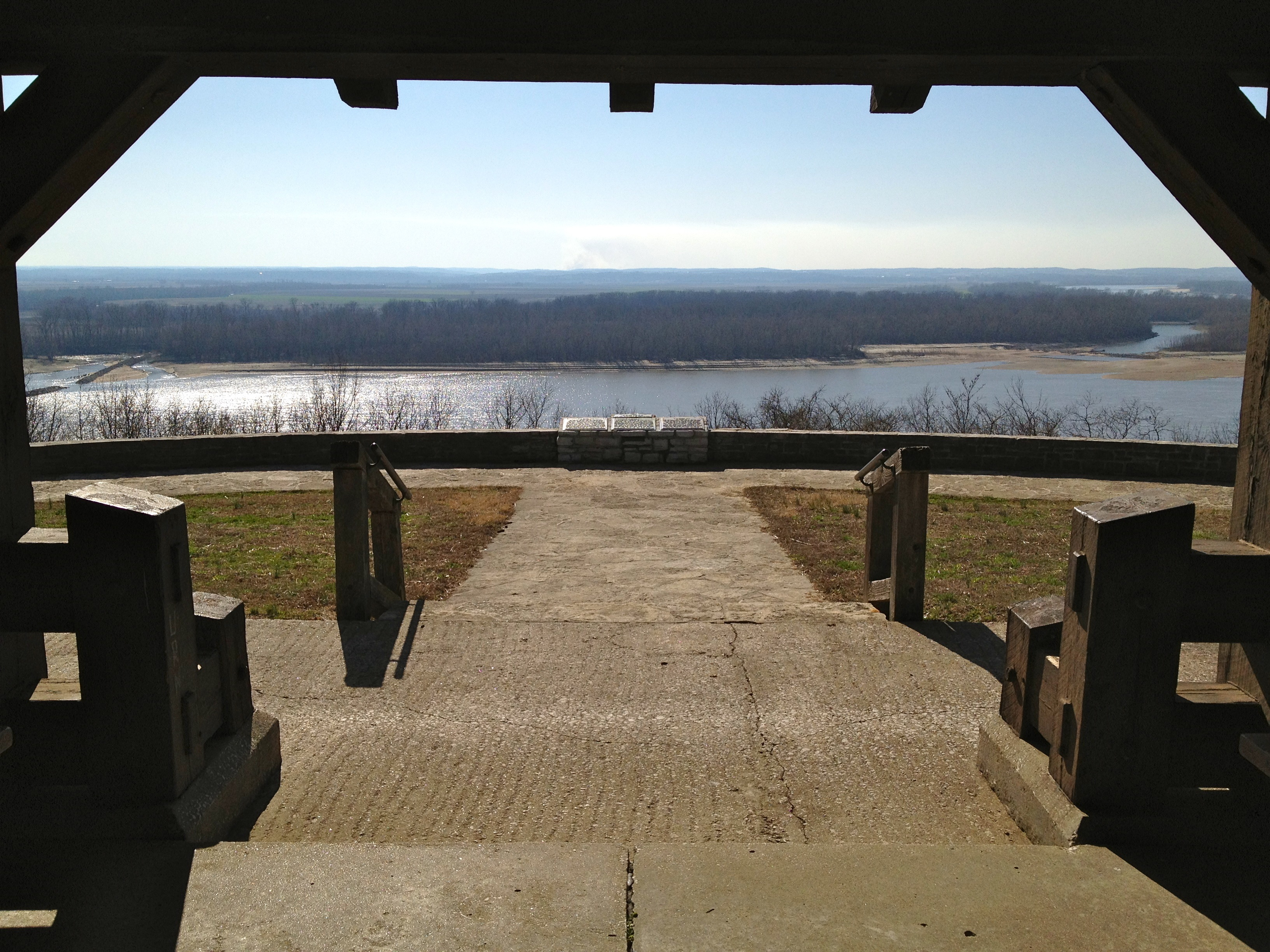
Fort's key strategic location overlooking the Mississippi River valley

Fort Kaskaskia State Historic Site is a 200-acre (0.8 km^{2}) park near Chester, Illinois, on a blufftop overlooking the Mississippi River. It commemorates the vanished frontier town of Old Kaskaskia and the support it gave to George Rogers Clark in the American Revolution.

== An earthen redoubt ==
The village of Kaskaskia, Illinois, was founded at the mouth of the Kaskaskia River in the Illinois Country as a missionary post by the Jesuits in 1703, on lands which were hunted and farmed by the tribal members of the Illinois Confederation. Soon afterwards, settlers from the Quebec and Louisiana regions began to trickle towards the rich, alluvial farmland of the central Mississippi Valley. They built a village and agricultural settlement around the location of the Jesuit mission, a half-circle of bottomland cradled by the Kaskaskia River and by an oxbow of the Mississippi.

French-speaking pioneers were noted throughout North America for their comparative fairness towards Native Americans. Furthermore, some French settlers and soldiers married and had children with Illini women, under the benediction of the priests of the Jesuit mission. However, as the Kaskaskia settlement grew throughout the 18th century, the local Indians may have realized that there might not be enough space for everybody. The French settlers raised Fort Kaskaskia around 1759; the fort stood atop the bluff that looked down upon the frontier village. "Fort Kaskaskia" is not technically a "fort", but an earthen redoubt. Frontier settlers throughout Woodland North America often built such redoubts as defensive moves during times of threat from Native Americans.

In 1763, the French ceded the eastern Illinois Country, including Kaskaskia and the abandoned fort, to Great Britain. The British did not use the fort and left Kaskaskia almost defenseless. Kaskaskia continued to exist as a French-speaking village on the Mississippi River frontier.

== A key strategic location ==
In early 1778, George Rogers Clark, eager to defend what was western Virginia and the Kentucky country from attacks by Native Americans allied to the British, led a tiny force down the Ohio River. Clark hoped to achieve a strategic coup by linking his expeditionary column with the French-speaking settlements of the Mississippi Valley.

Clark and his men marched overland from Fort Massac, near the present-day Metropolis, Illinois, to Kaskaskia. They avoided being sighted by the British or their Native allies and arrived at Kaskaskia on July 4, 1778. Most of the Kaskaskia townspeople welcomed them.

After facing a threat from a British force at Vincennes, Indiana, Clark and his men used Kaskaskia as their jumping-off place to capture Vincennes in early 1779. The Americans controlled Kaskaskia and its redoubt throughout the rest of the war, and won legal control of the territory in the 1783 Treaty of Paris.

== Kaskaskia, Illinois ==
Following the war, Kaskaskia was part of the United States and the large, French-speaking population became slowly Americanized. Lewis and Clark stopped here in 1803 and recruited many of the professional hunters and sharpshooters that accompanied them to the Pacific Ocean in their fateful 1804–1806 expedition.

The village served as the only capital of Illinois Territory in 1809–1818, and briefly (1818–1820) as the first capital of the new U.S. state of Illinois following Illinois's admission to the Union on December 3, 1818. Pierre Menard, a wealthy fur trader who lived across the Kaskaskia River from Kaskaskia at the bottom of the Fort Kaskaskia redoubt, was elected the new state's first Lieutenant Governor.

== Disaster and new life ==
During much of the 19th century and especially after the American Civil War, the Mississippi River cut through many of its former oxbows and shortened its channel considerably.

In 1881, during a flood, the moving water of the Mississippi "discovered" a much smaller, parallel riverbed, the mouth of the Kaskaskia. Kaskaskia's bed was a few feet lower than the Mississippi's bed, so the whole river shifted to the new watercourse, cutting across the head of a former oxbow to do so.

For the village of Kaskaskia, the river's new course was disastrous. Their village had been by the waterfront of the much smaller river; now the mighty Mississippi was swallowing the town up. Even the village cemeteries were at risk.

In an emergency operation, 3,000 graves of the departed of Kaskaskia were exhumed and the remains reburied atop the bluff to the east, at the site of old Fort Kaskaskia. The state of Illinois agreed to maintain the site forever as a memorial to the vanished historic village.

== The fort today ==
Fort Kaskaskia is a campsite and picnic area overlooking the Mississippi River. The remains of the 18th-century redoubt can be vaguely traced in the earth. The prominent Kaskaskia cemetery recalls the 1881 flood.

The site was named one of the contributing properties to the new French Colonial Historic District in 1974, along with other area French-influenced sites such as Fort de Chartres, the Creole House, the Kolmer Site (a former Indian village), and the Pierre Menard House.
