= French Colonial Historic District =

Historic district in Illinois, United States

- U.S. National Register of Historic Places
- U.S. Historic district
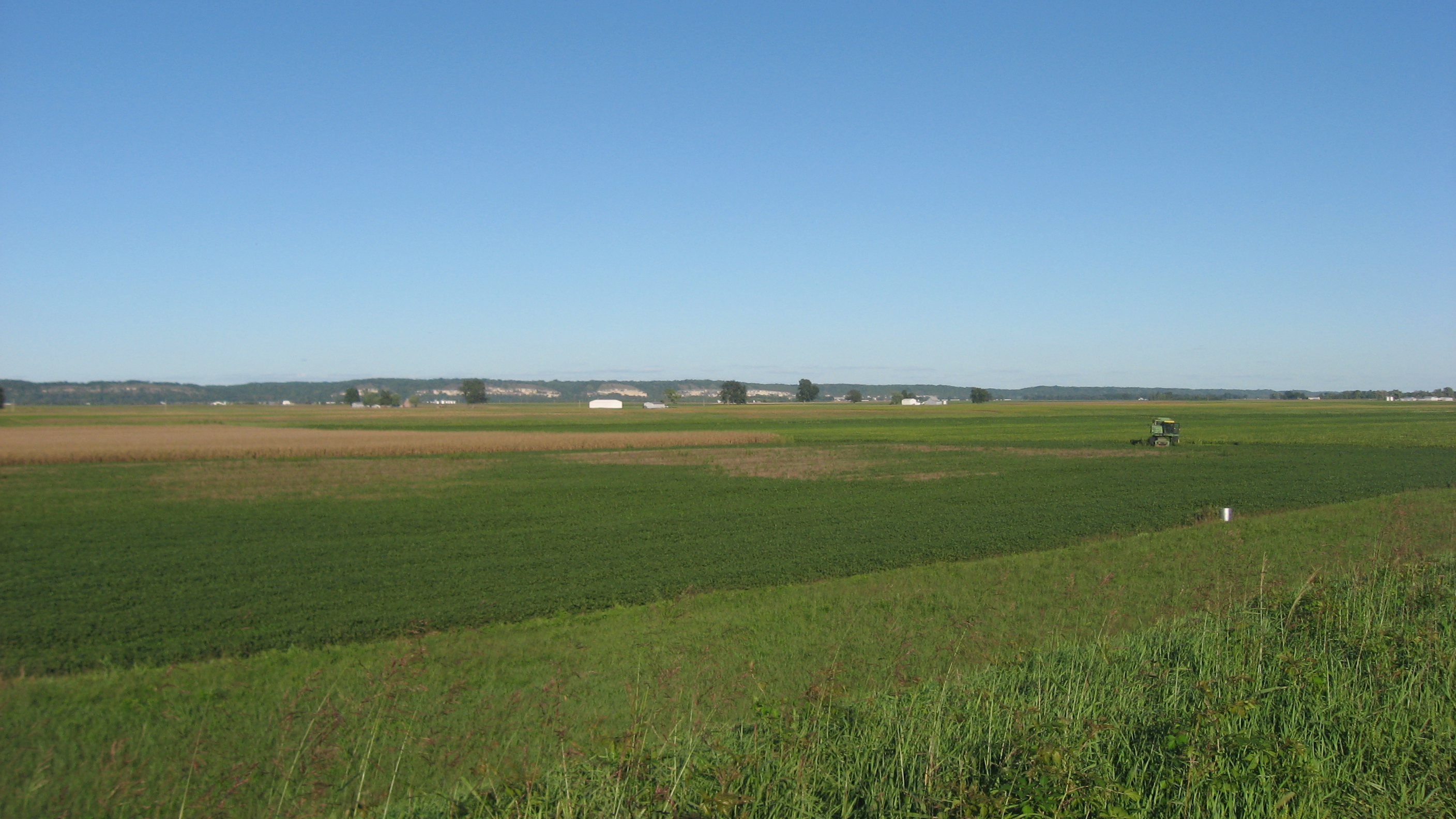

- Location within Illinois Location within the United States
- Location: From Fort Chartres State Park to Kaskaskia Island, Prairie du Rocher, Illinois
- Coordinates: 38°04′48″N 90°07′48″W
- Area: 14,080 acres (5,700 ha)
- NRHP reference No.: 74000772
- Added to NRHP: April 3, 1974

The French Colonial Historic District is a historic district that encompasses a major region of 18th-century French colonization in southwestern Illinois. The district is anchored by Fort de Chartres and Fort Kaskaskia, two important French settlements and military posts in what was then the Illinois Country. The Kaskaskia village site is also included within the district; it includes the Pierre Menard House, the only surviving building from Illinois' first state capital. Over a dozen French houses in Prairie du Rocher are also part of the district, including the poteaux-sur-sol Creole House and the 1735 Meilliere House. In addition to the French sites, the district also includes several Native American archaeological sites, such as the Modoc Rock Shelter, the Kolmer Site, the Waterman Site, and the Henke Site.

The district was added to the National Register of Historic Places on April 3, 1974.
