= La Guiannee =

French medieval New Year's Eve tradition

La Guiannée (or La Guignolée) is celebrated on December 31 (New Year's Eve). It is a French medieval New Year's Eve tradition dating back to the 1600s that is still practiced in two towns in the United States. The phrase La Guiannée may be derived from au gui l'an neuf, a refrain from the Druidic era.

== Customs ==
La Guiannée is similar to the tradition of wassailing and is a "begging quest ritual" in which poor people ask the wealthy for food and drink during winter celebrations. Customarily, a troupe of traveling male singers went from door to door to entertain and ring in the new year. Hosts were expected to give them food and drink. The also requested the presence of the household's oldest daughter, but if no daughter was available, one of the men would dress as a woman to fill the role of la fille aînée (the firstborn daughter). Other sources say the young men were seeking donations for Twelfth Night. Although the practice began as a way for the poor to be given gratuities by the rich, it also became a community social event for young men to visit with the families of young women.

Over time, the practice became an occasion for visiting with relatives and friends and was more or less a traveling feast. At first, only young men, often in costume, performed La Guiannée; women joined some of the modern groups in the 20th century. Many years, the performers appeared in disguise, as part of the celebration was a kind of overturning of the common order.

== Modern practice ==
This tradition has been practiced annually since 1722 in Prairie du Rocher, Illinois. It has been revived in Ste. Genevieve, Missouri. Both were former French colonial villages settled by French Canadians in the 18th century.

In the Ste. Genevieve, current celebrations feature singers and musicians, attired in colonial dress, who begin their night's journey at the local American Legion Hall. They make their way through all the restaurants, bars, nursing homes and high school gyms, ending at midnight at the Knights of Columbus Hall.

=== Song ===
Revelers traditionally sing La Guiannée and there are multiple versions of the song. Here is one French version alongside an English version (not a direct translation).

Bonjour le maître et la maîtresse
Et tous les gens de la maison
Nous avons fait un promesse
De v'nir vous voir une fois l'an.
Un fois l'an ce n'est pas grand'chose
Qu'un petit morceau de chignée

Un petit morceau de chignée,
Si vous voulez,
Si vous voulez rien nous donner
Dites nous lé
Nous prendrons la fille aînée,
Nous y ferons chauffer les pieds!
La Ignolée! La Ignoloche!
Pour mettre du lard dans ma poche!
Nous, ne demandons pas grand chose
Pour l'arrivée.
Vingt'cinq ou trent pieds de chignée,
Si vous voulez.
Nous sommes cinq ou six bons drôles,
Et si notre chant n'vous plaît pas
Nous ferons du feu dans les bois,
Etant à lómbre,
On entendra chante lćoucou
Et la coulombe!

Good evening master and mistress,
And all who live with you.
For the first day of the year,
You owe us La Guignolée.

If you have nothing to give,
A chine of meat or so will do.
A chine of meat is not a big thing,
Only ninety feet long.

Again, we don't ask for very much,
Only the oldest daughter of the house.
We will give her lots of good cheer,
And we will surely warm her feet.

Now, we greet you,
And beg you to forgive us please.
If we have acted a little crazy,
We meant it in good fun.

Another time we'll surely be careful
To know when we must come back here again.
Let us dance La Guenille,
-- La Guenille, La Guenille!
