= Prairie du Rocher, Illinois =

Prairie du Rocher
- Village
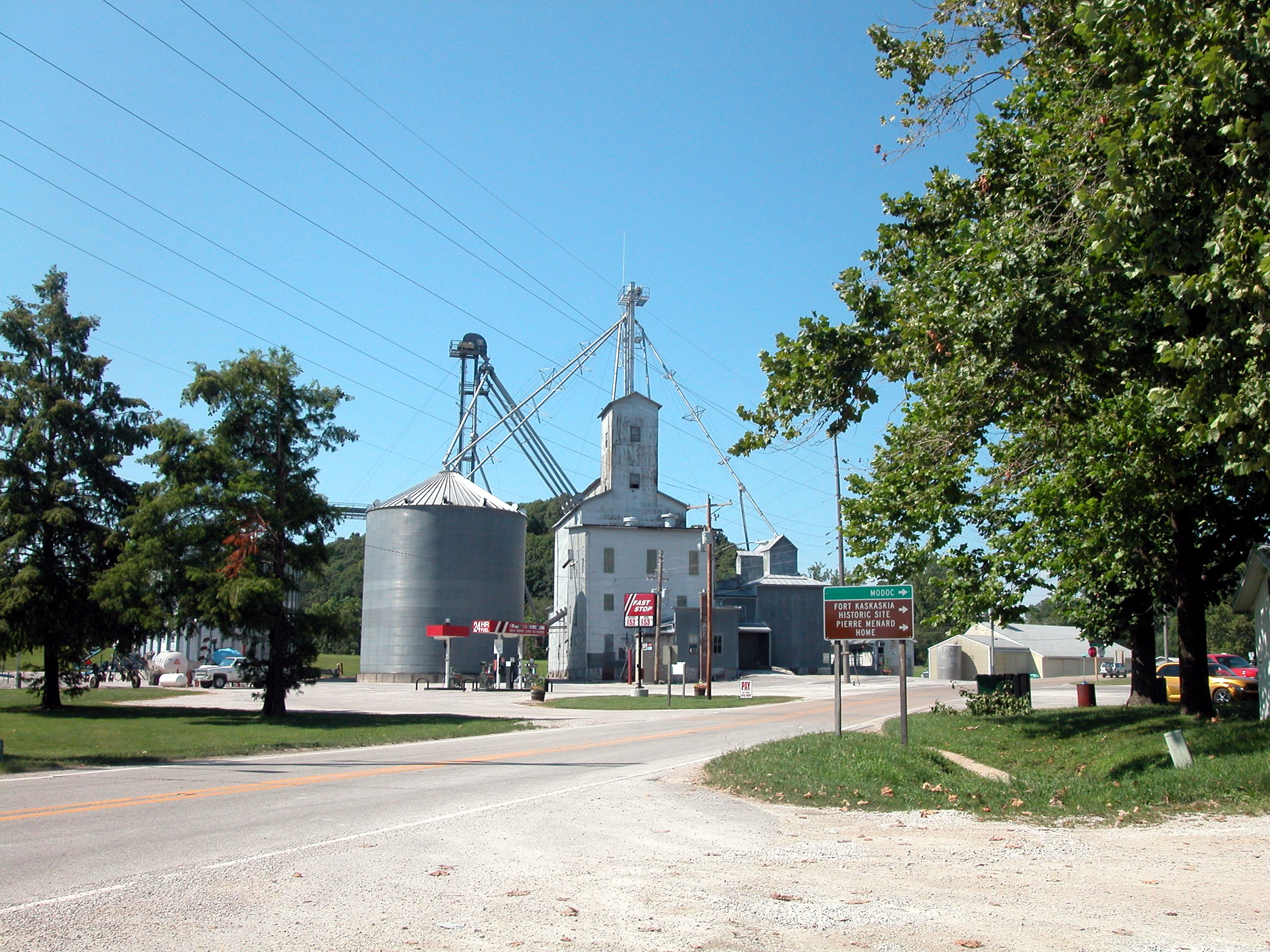
- A grain elevator in Prairie du Rocher

- Flag

- Location of Prairie du Rocher in Randolph County, Illinois.
- Coordinates: 38°04′54″N 90°05′51″W
- Country: United States
- State: Illinois
- County: Randolph
- Precinct: Prairie du Rocher
- Founded: 1722

Area
  - Total: 0.57 sq mi (1.48 km^{2})
  - Land: 0.57 sq mi (1.48 km^{2})
  - Water: 0 sq mi (0.00 km^{2})
- Elevation: 390 ft (120 m)

Population (2020)
  - Total: 502
  - Density: 878.6/sq mi (339.24/km^{2})
- Time zone: UTC-6 (CST)
  - Summer (DST): UTC-5 (CDT)
- ZIP code: 62277
- Area code: 618
- FIPS code: 17-61639
- GNIS feature ID: 2399019

Prairie du Rocher ("The Rock Prairie" in French) is a village in Randolph County, Illinois, United States. Founded in the French colonial period in the Midwest, the community is located near bluffs that flank the east side of the Mississippi River along the floodplain often called the "American Bottom". The population was 502 at the 2020 census.

== History ==
Prairie du Rocher is one of the oldest communities in the 21st-century United States that was founded as a French settlement. About four miles to the west, closer to the Mississippi River, is Fort de Chartres, site of a French military fortification and colonial headquarters established in 1720. Some buildings were reconstructed after falling into ruin, and the complex is now a state park and historical site. The fort and the town were a center of government and commerce when France claimed a vast territory in North America, New France or La Louisiane, which stretched from present-day Louisiana and the Illinois Country to Canada.

The village was founded in 1722 by French colonists, mostly migrants from Canada.

=== New France ===
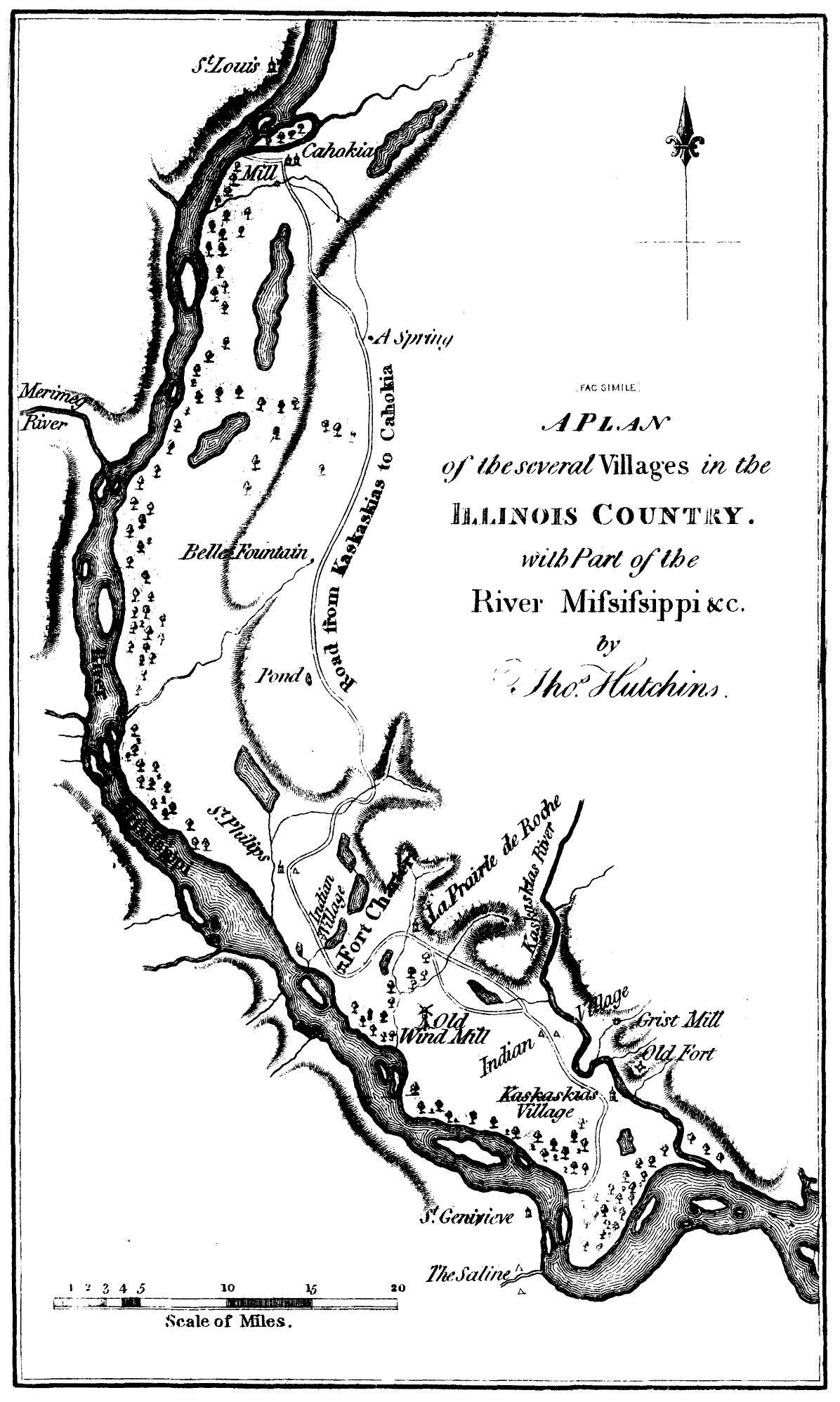
French Colonial Illinois Country

In 1718, Pierre Dugué de Boisbriand built the first Fort de Chartres. In 1722, St. Thérèse Langlois, a nephew of Boisbriand, founded Prairie du Rocher. The town was built on a tract of land donated by the Royal Indian Company. Boisbriand later became the commandant of the area. The town was strategically located along fertile Mississippi River bottomland. Surpluses from the productive cultivation by habitants later helped supply critical wheat and corn to New Orleans and other lower Louisiana Territory communities.

D'Artaguette, an inspector in the country in the early 18th century, wrote:

This country is one of the most beautiful in all Louisiana. Every kind of grain and vegetables are produced here in the greatest abundance .... they have, also, large numbers of oxen, cows, sheep, etc., upon the prairies. Poultry is abundant, and fish plentiful. So that, in fact, they lack none of the necessaries or conveniences of life.

In 1743 the territorial government granted the Prairie du Rocher Common (land used by all the villagers) to the village; the common was used until 1852. The villagers had plots for cultivation defined in typical French fashion: long narrow lots that reached back from the riverfront through the common. The villagers kept the plots open within the common, and built a fence around it to keep out livestock. A school existed as early as the 1760s; students boarded with local families.

Because the habitants did not practice fertilization, the soil became exhausted. In addition, an increase in population meant there was not sufficient land for everyone. Some villagers moved to the west side of the Mississippi and founded Ste. Genevieve about 1750, in present-day Missouri. They quickly created an agricultural community with characteristics similar to Prairie du Rocher.

=== British rule ===
Following their victory in the French and Indian War (also known as the Seven Years' War), the British gained possession of French lands east of the Mississippi, excluding New Orleans. The Treaty of Paris was signed in 1763; however, the British did not arrive in force until 1765. To avoid British rule, many of the town's French residents moved across the Mississippi River to towns such as Ste. Genevieve and St. Louis in what was now, via the secret Treaty of Fontainebleau, Spanish Louisiana. Additionally, King George III's Royal Proclamation of 1763 designated all the land west of the Appalachians and east of the Mississippi an Indian Reserve. He tried to prevent settlers entering from the British Colonies.

=== American Revolution ===
During the American Revolutionary War, George Rogers Clark captured Prairie du Rocher for the colonies in his Illinois campaign that also resulted in the capture of Vincennes, Indiana. Reportedly, his campaign caused some of the remaining French settlers to emigrate to the Spanish-controlled territories west of the Mississippi, leaving relatively few in Prairie du Rocher. Many of the subsequent settlers of the area had been members of Clark's campaign, or were related to someone who was. They were convinced of the promise of the area by tales of the fertility of the soil in the area now called American Bottom.

=== 1993 floods ===
Prairie du Rocher was one of the few towns along the Mississippi River that escaped being flooded in the Great Flood of 1993. After levees broke to the north near the towns of Columbia and Valmeyer, Illinois, flood waters engulfed Fort de Chartres. They also threatened the town of Prairie du Rocher.

With only the Prairie du Rocher Creek levee protecting the town, residents discovered a unique situation had developed. The water that had broken through the main Mississippi River levee and was approaching the top of the Prairie du Rocher Creek levee was higher than the water in the main Mississippi River channel. The Army Corps of Engineers decided to use a barge-mounted shovel to break through the Mississippi River levee near Fort de Chartres, to allow flood waters to escape back to the Mississippi River channel. While not significantly lowering the water level, the COE decided against any further action.

In a 3:30 a.m. decision, with the flood waters at the top of the sandbags stacked on top of the Prairie du Rocher Creek levee, all three commissioners of the Fort de Chartres – Ivy Landing Drainage and Levee District voted to use dynamite to breach the levee in two additional locations. Because of risk, the COE had argued against such a decision. The village put out a call for help and added a foot and a half of sandbags to the creek levee. Finally, the two openings allowed enough water to escape back to the main channel so that the town was saved from flooding. The levee still stands strong today.

=== Recent history ===
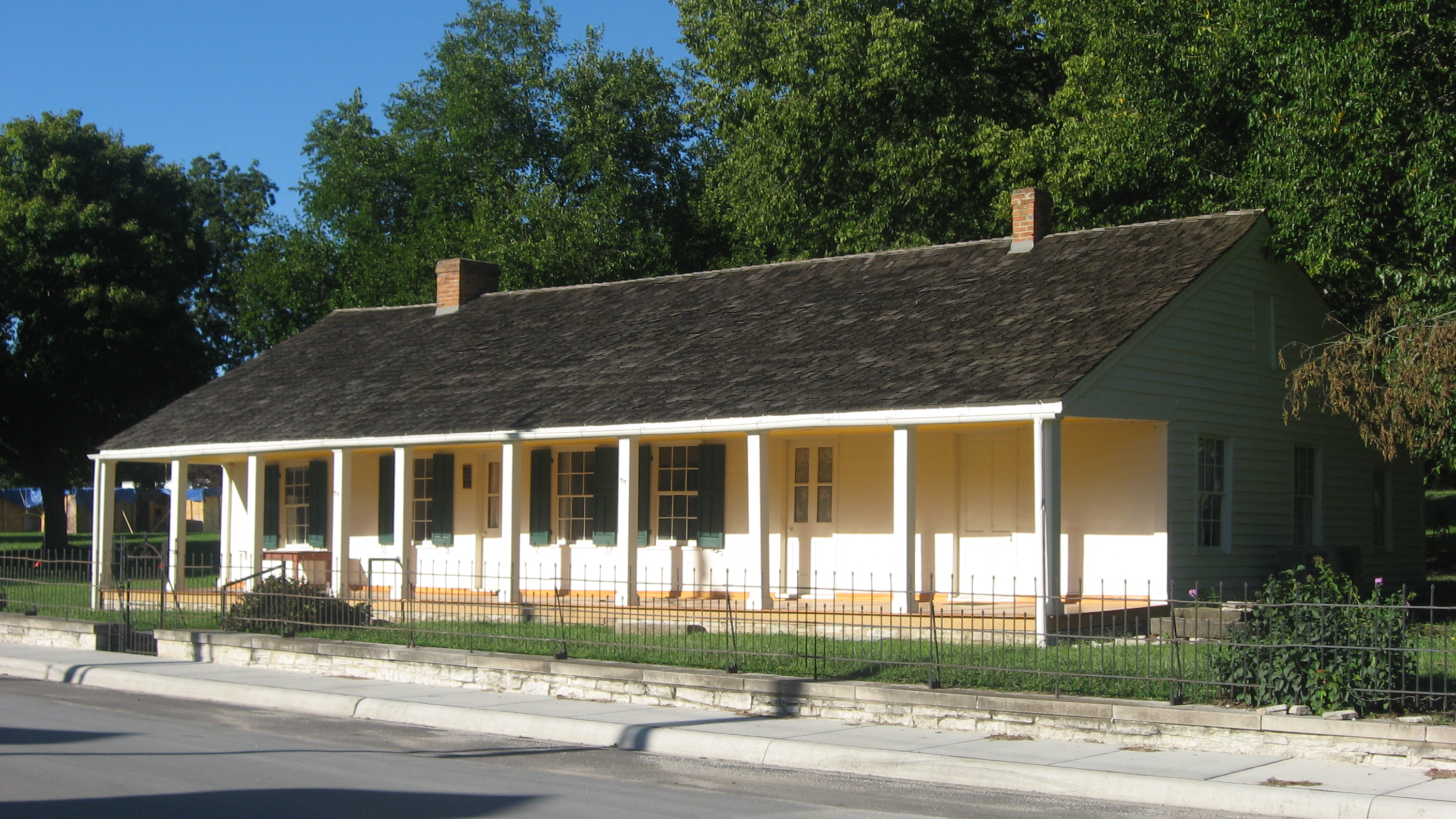
Creole House

French settlers founded Prairie du Rocher circa 1722. At least twelve surviving houses in the village were built in the eighteenth century, including the Melliere House, which was constructed in 1735. Another is the Creole House, constructed in 1800, which was built in the French Colonial style by an unknown English-speaking immigrant from the eastern United States.

== Geography ==
According to the 2010 census, Prairie du Rocher has a total area of 0.57 square miles (1.48 km^{2}), all land.

Illinois Route 155 is the only state highway that runs through Prairie du Rocher. It connects the town with Ruma, 7 miles (11 km) to the northeast, and Fort de Chartres, 4 miles (6 km) to the west. Bluff Road connects the town to as far south as Ellis Grove and as far north as Columbia.

== Demographics ==
Historical population
| Census | Pop. | Note | %± |
|---|---|---|---|
| 1880 | 228 | | — |
| 1890 | 408 | | 78.9% |
| 1900 | 347 | | −15.0% |
| 1910 | 511 | | 47.3% |
| 1920 | 535 | | 4.7% |
| 1930 | 510 | | −4.7% |
| 1940 | 576 | | 12.9% |
| 1950 | 662 | | 14.9% |
| 1960 | 679 | | 2.6% |
| 1970 | 658 | | −3.1% |
| 1980 | 701 | | 6.5% |
| 1990 | 540 | | −23.0% |
| 2000 | 613 | | 13.5% |
| 2010 | 604 | | −1.5% |
| 2020 | 502 | | −16.9% |
U.S. Decennial Census

As of the census of 2000, there were 613 people, 240 households, and 160 families residing in the village. The population density was 1,076.2 inhabitants per square mile (415.5/km^{2}). There were 255 housing units at an average density of 447.7 units per square mile (172.9 units/km^{2}). The racial makeup of the village was 99.02% White, 0.33% Native American, and 0.65% from two or more races.

There were 240 households, out of which 39.2% had children under the age of 18 living with them, 52.5% were married couples living together, 9.2% had a female householder with no husband present, and 33.3% were non-families. 28.3% of all households were made up of individuals, and 12.9% had someone living alone who was 65 years of age or older. The average household size was 2.55 and the average family size was 3.16.

In the village, the population was spread out, with 29.2% under the age of 18, 9.5% from 18 to 24, 27.2% from 25 to 44, 22.0% from 45 to 64, and 12.1% who were 65 years of age or older. The median age was 34 years. For every 100 females, there were 81.4 males. For every 100 females age 18 and over, there were 89.5 males.

The median income for a household in the village was $35,795, and the median income for a family was $44,659. Males had a median income of $31,750 versus $20,556 for females. The per capita income for the village was $14,771. About 9.3% of families and 8.3% of the population were below the poverty line, including 6.3% of those under age 18 and 14.3% of those age 65 or over.

== Arts and culture ==
French customs practiced in Prairie du Rocher include La Guiannée, a custom of caroling on New Year's Eve dating back to medieval times in France. It has been celebrated in Prairie du Rocher every New Year's Eve since settlement in 1722. The town also celebrates Rendezvous during the summer, as well as the winter, at the Fort de Chartres. During that time, people from a broad area come to camp out for the weekend. They dress like Indians and French soldiers of the mid-18th century, camp out at the fort, and re-enact the wars that decided the ownership of the fort.

Fort de Chartres is a French military fort constructed in the 18th century. It later was designated an Illinois state historic site.

== Education ==
The town has one elementary school for grades K-8. Students must travel to a nearby town for high school. The village has a library and two parks, one owned by the school and the other by the town.

== Infrastructure ==
The volunteer fire department occupies part of the city hall (which also houses the post office).

== Notable people ==
- Henry C. Hansbrough, U.S. Congressman and Senator from North Dakota

== Gallery ==
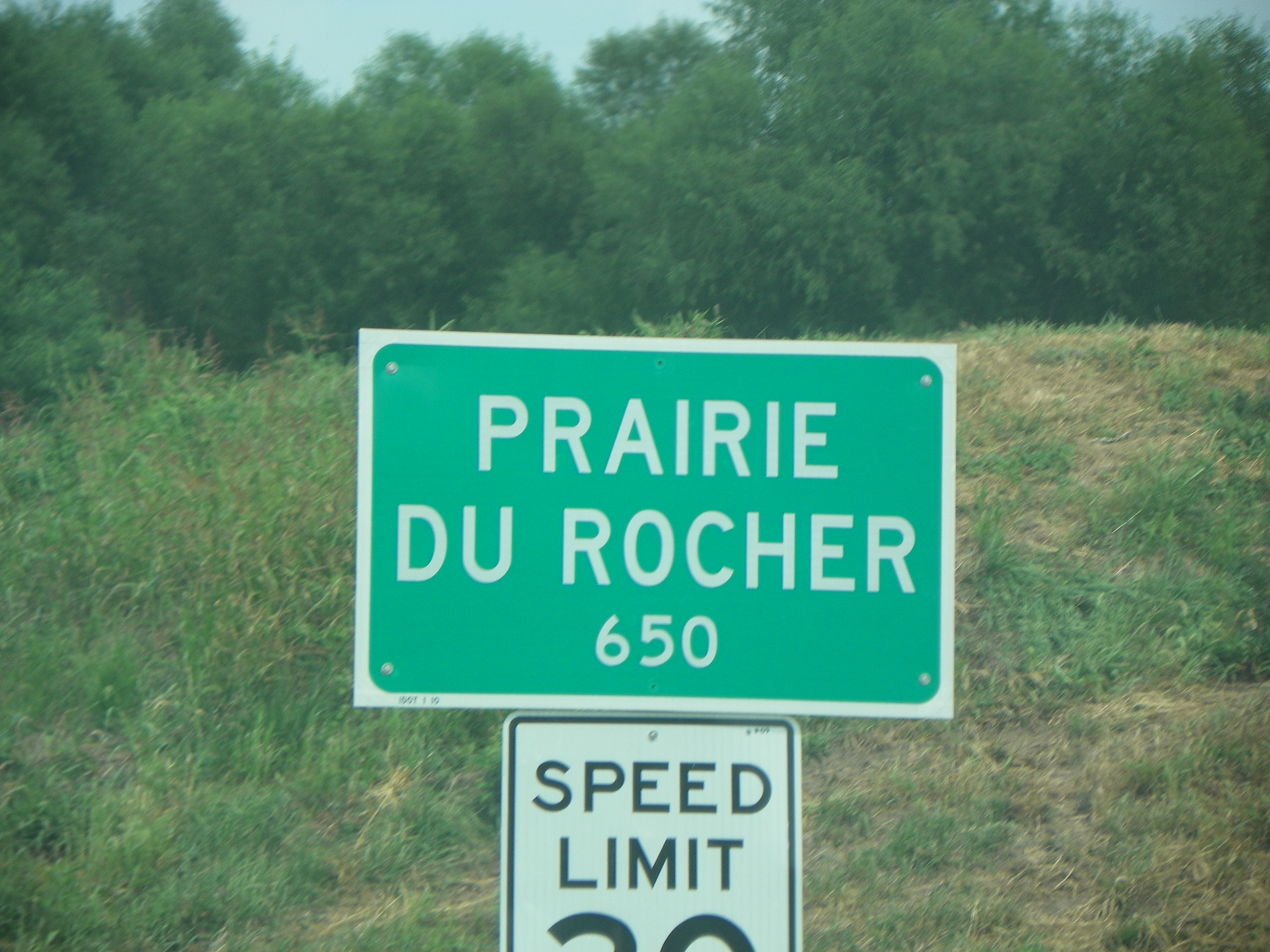
Road sign

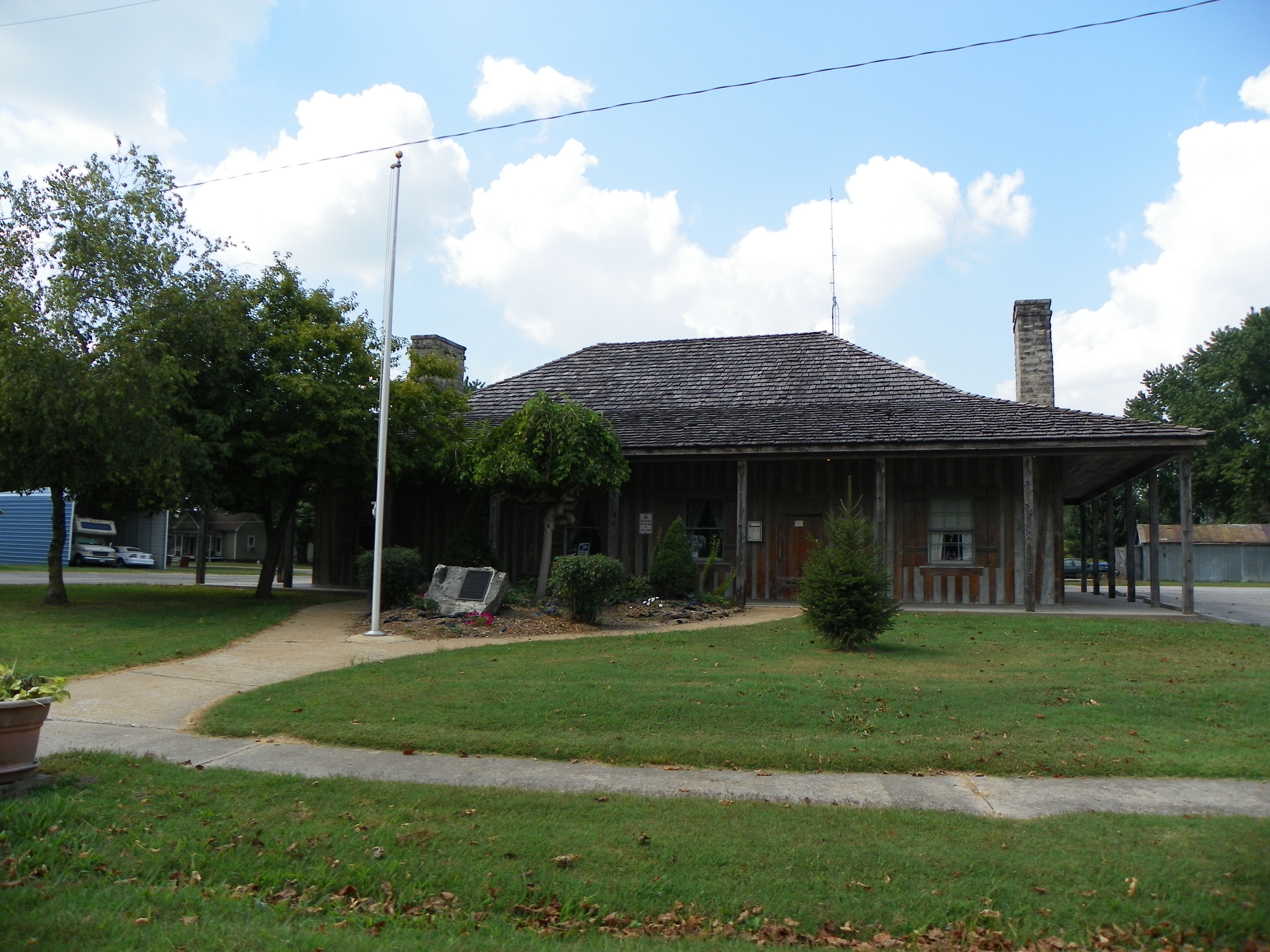
French-Colonial style house

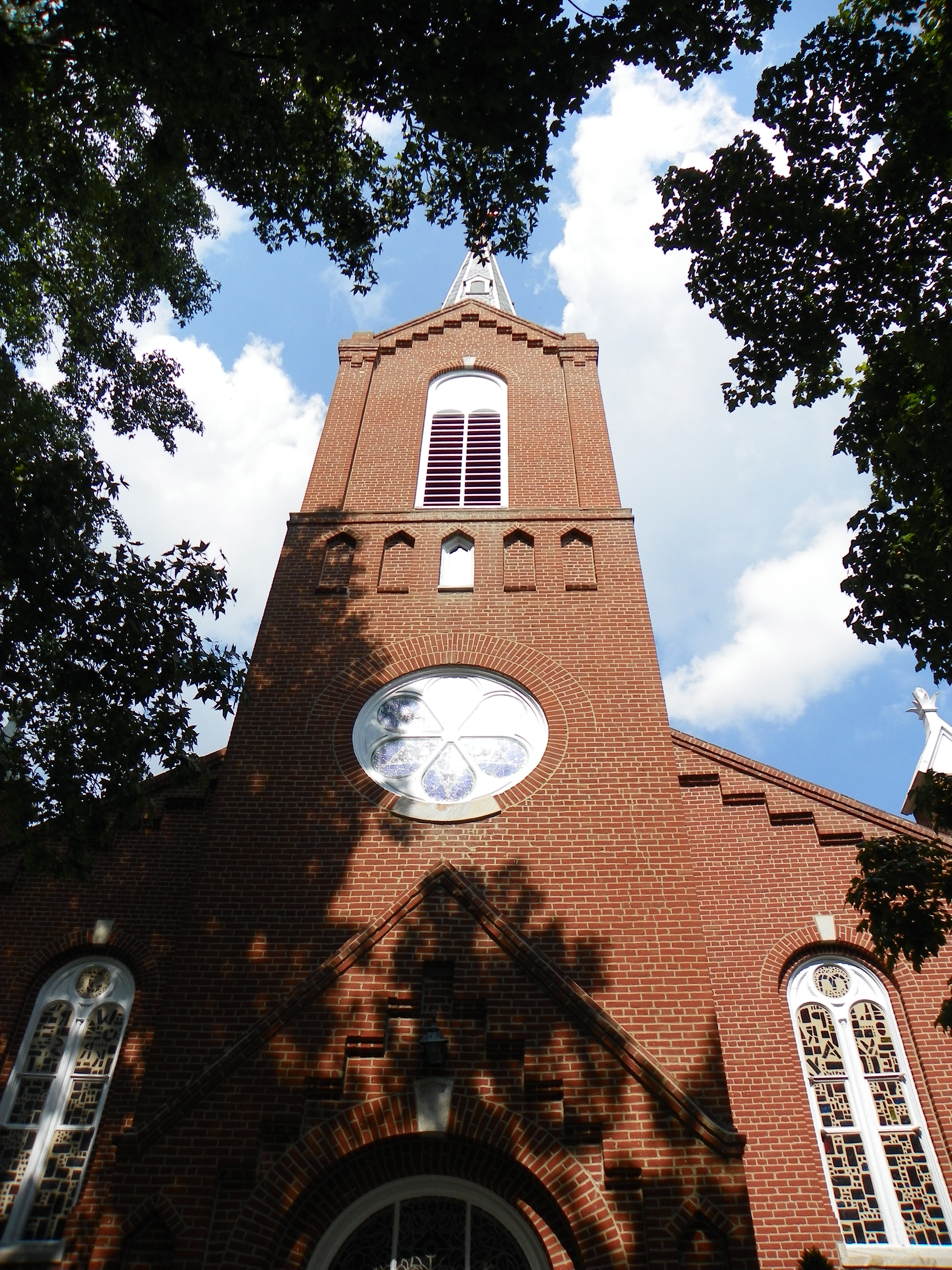
St. Joseph Roman Catholic Church
