= 1818 Illinois lieutenant gubernatorial election =

- September 17, 1818
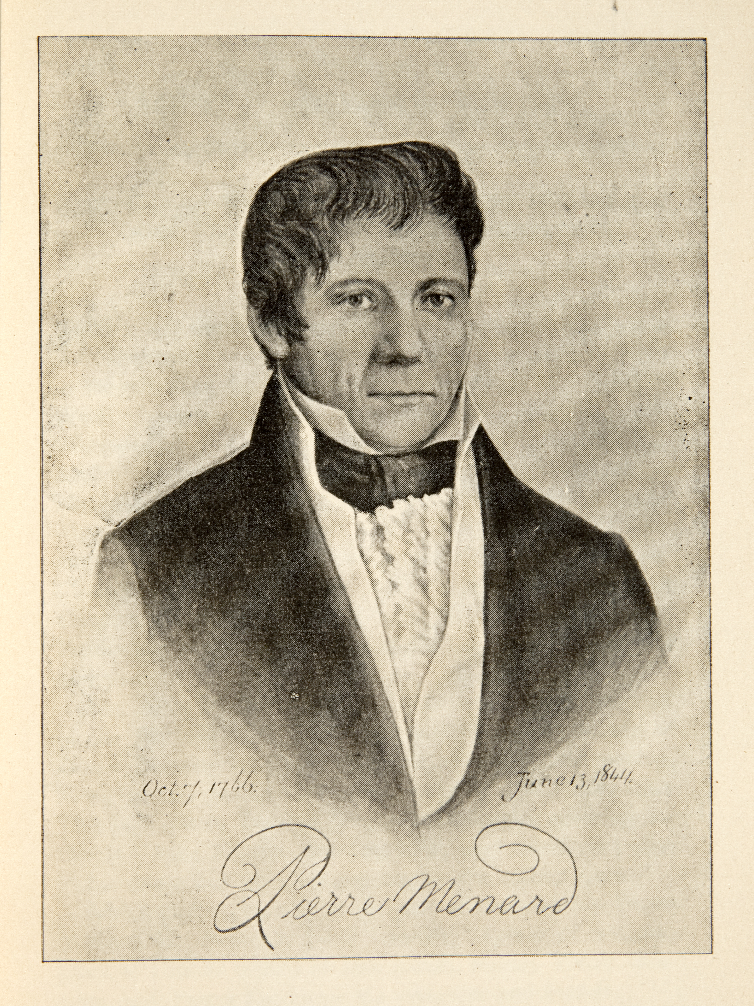

Nominee	Pierre Menard	William L. Reynolds	Edward N. Cullom
Party	Democratic-Republican	Democratic-Republican	Democratic-Republican
Popular vote	2,133	914	760
Percentage	56.03%	24.01%	19.96%
Lieutenant Governor before election
Office Established
Elected Lieutenant Governor
Pierre Menard
Democratic-Republican

The 1818 Illinois lieutenant gubernatorial election was held on September 17, 1818, in order to elect the first lieutenant governor of Illinois upon Illinois acquiring statehood on December 3, 1818. Democratic-Republican candidate Pierre Menard defeated fellow Democratic-Republican candidates William L. Reynolds and Edward N. Cullom.

== General election ==
On election day, September 17, 1818, Democratic-Republican candidate Pierre Menard won the election by a margin of 1,219 votes against his foremost opponent and fellow Democratic-Republican candidate William L. Reynolds, thereby gaining Democratic-Republican control over the office of lieutenant governor. Menard was sworn in as the 1st lieutenant governor of Illinois on October 6, 1818.

=== Results ===
Illinois lieutenant gubernatorial election, 1818
Party	Candidate	Votes	%
Democratic-Republican	Pierre Menard	2,133	56.03
Democratic-Republican	William L. Reynolds	914	24.01
Democratic-Republican	Edward N. Cullom	760	19.96
Total votes		3,807	100.00
Democratic-Republican gain from			

== See also ==
- 1818 Illinois gubernatorial election
