= Pierre Menard =

Fur trader and politician (1766–1844)

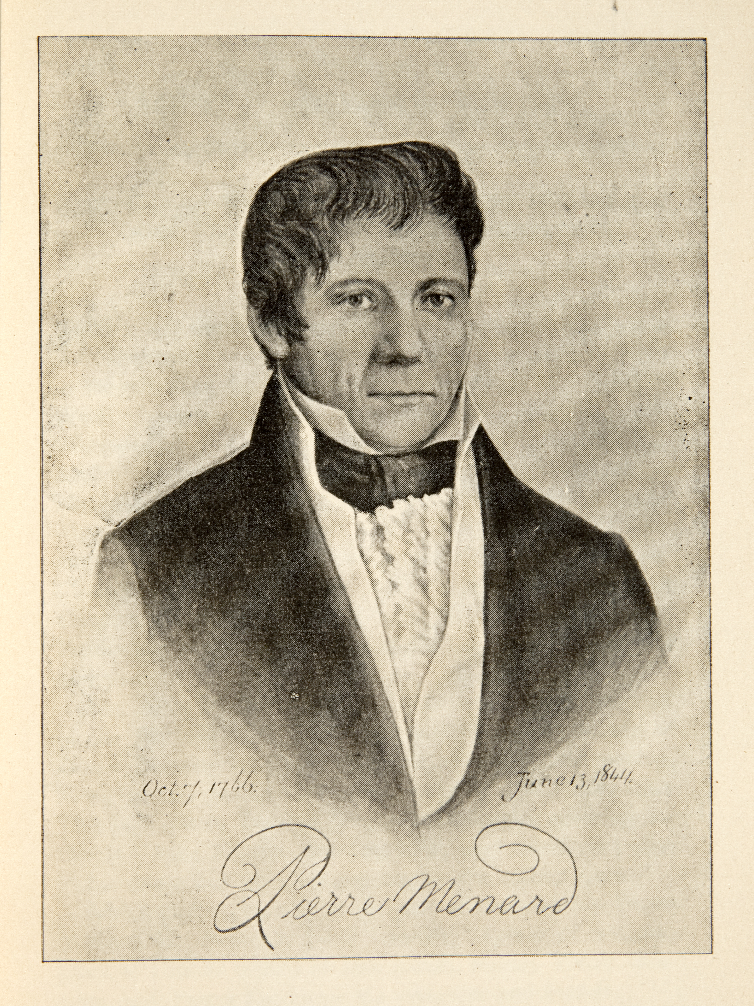

1st Lieutenant Governor of Illinois
- In office December 3, 1818 – December 5, 1822
- Governor: Shadrach Bond
- Preceded by: Office Established
- Succeeded by: Adolphus Hubbard

Personal details
- Born: October 7, 1766 Saint-Antoine-sur-Richelieu, Quebec, Canada
- Died: June 13, 1844 (aged 77) Kaskaskia, Illinois, U.S.
- Party: Democratic-Republican
- Spouses: Therese Godin (m. 1792; died 1804) Angelique Saucier (m. 1806; died 1839)
- Children: 10

Pierre Menard (7 October 1766 – 13 June 1844) was a Canadian-American fur trader and politician who was elected the first lieutenant Governor of Illinois in 1818.

== Biography ==
=== Early life ===
Menard was born at St. Antoine-sur-Richelieu, near Montreal, Canada, third in a family of ten children. His father was Jean Baptiste Ménard, a French soldier in the regiment of Guyenne.

After a short period of formal schooling in Montreal, Pierre, at about age fifteen, signed on with a trading expedition to the vast Illinois Country. By the early 1790s Menard had established a solid trading business of his own; his Kaskaskia business ledgers first recorded transactions, beginning in the spring of 1791. He was granted a St. Clair County commercial license in 1793 at the age of thirty, while already a respected entrepreneur.

=== Family ===
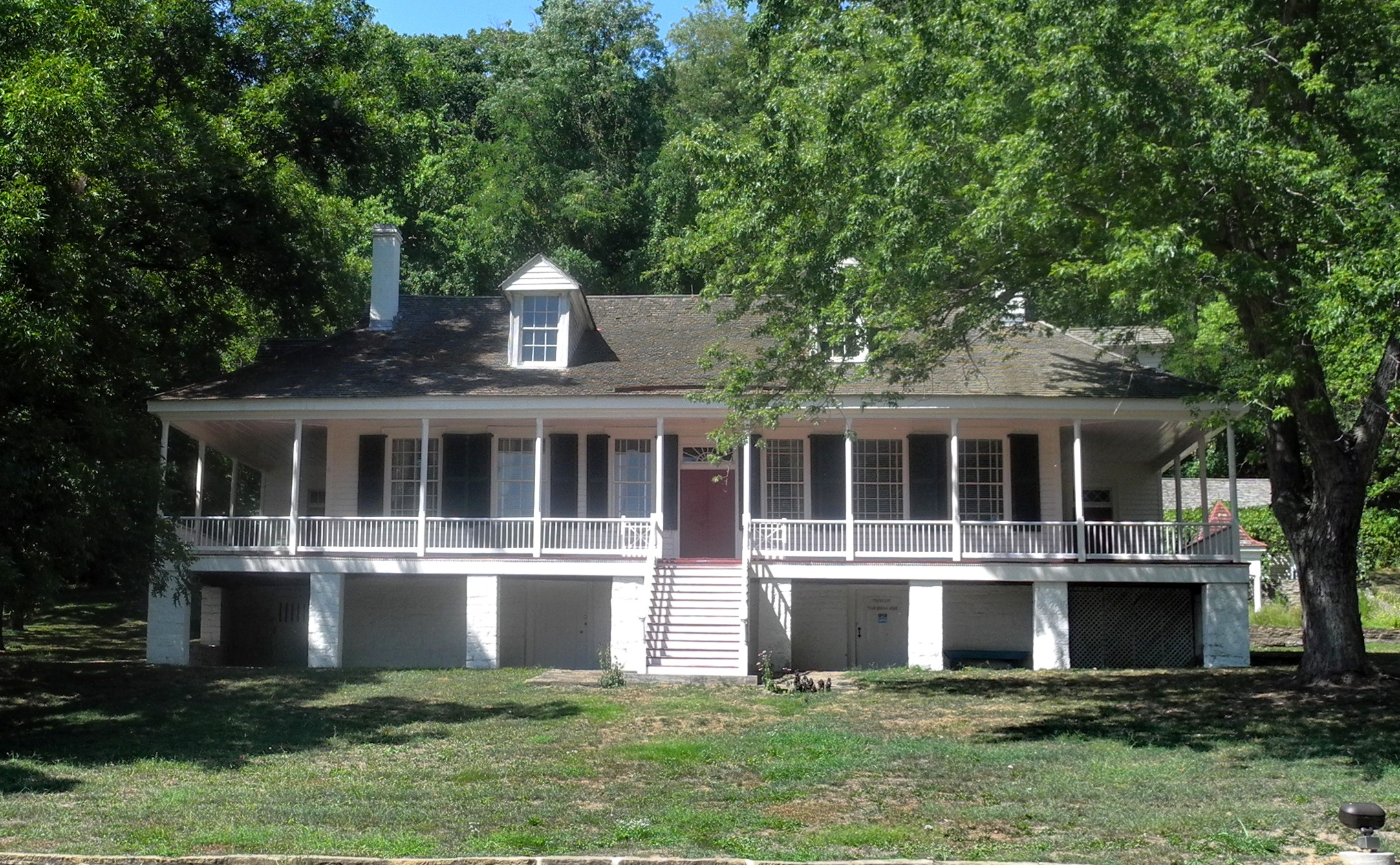
Pierre Menard's home, built in 1802

In 1792, Menard married Thérèse Godin, who died in 1804, leaving four children. Two years later, he married Angélique Saucier, granddaughter of François Saucier, Engineer General in the French army and construction supervisor of nearby Fort de Chartres. Eight children were born to Pierre and Angélique.

=== Political career ===
Menard was a member of the Indiana Territorial Legislature, 1803–1809, and president of the Illinois Territorial Council 1812–1818.

The Illinois Territory was a frontier region of the United States, formerly part of the Illinois Country, a portion of New France administered originally from Quebec and later transferred to Louisiana. Upon the admission of Illinois as a state in 1818, the population of the new state was divided between French-speaking and English-speaking citizens. To balance the ticket, Menard became the state's first Lieutenant Governor, serving from 1818 to 1822 with the first governor, Shadrach Bond.

Economic forces, however, were already leading people inland from the French-speaking areas along the Mississippi River, and largely to promote real estate interests, the first Illinois General Assembly decided in 1820 to move the state capital from Kaskaskia, Menard's home town, to Vandalia.

Menard left office in 1822 and returned to private life.

=== Fur trading ===
Along with his political career, Menard had a second career as a fur trader. In March 1809 he joined the Missouri Fur Company, and that spring, he set out with an expedition of 350 men to trap beaver on the upper Missouri River. After a stop at Fort Mandan in present-day North Dakota, the company wintered at Fort Raymond at the confluence of the Bighorn and Yellowstone rivers. In March 1810, along with fur trader Andrew Henry, Menard led thirty-three men to the headwaters of the Missouri where they established a post. The expedition, however, failed after a series of attacks by Blackfeet raiding parties that killed several trappers and stole their pelts and traps. Menard left the upper Missouri in May and returned home.

He died in 1844 and was buried at Fort Kaskaskia, near his house.

=== Legacy ===
Menard County, Illinois is named for the Lieutenant Governor. His house, near Chester, Illinois, is preserved as the Pierre Menard Home State Historic Site.

Bayou Manard, a branch of the Arkansas River, was named for Pierre Menard.

Menard was, until 2020, commemorated by a statue on the Illinois Statehouse grounds. His statue was the first installed, and is one of only three honoring previous state executives (along with Governors Yates and Palmer). On 19 August 2020, the Office of the Architect of the Capitol announced plans to remove the statues of both Menard and Stephen Douglas, as both had been slave owners. The statues were removed on 26 September 2020.

Political offices
Preceded by Office established	Lieutenant Governor of Illinois; 1818–1822	Succeeded by Adolphus Hubbard
