= 1818 Illinois gubernatorial election =

- September 17–19, 1818
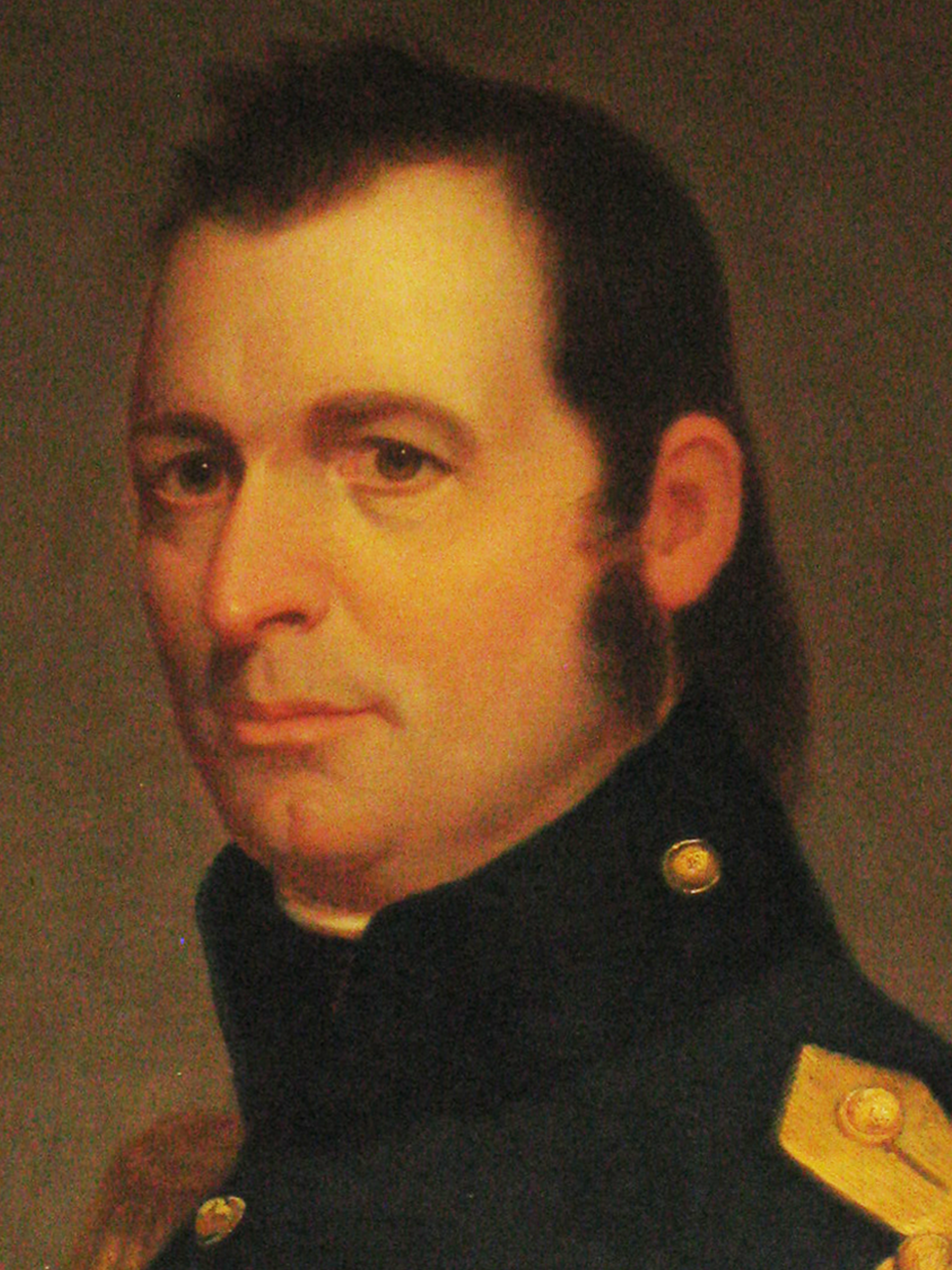
Candidate	Shadrach Bond
Party	Independent
Popular vote	3,828
Percentage	98.99%
- County Results Bond: 90–100% Unknown/No Vote
Governor before election
Office Created
Elected Governor
Shadrach Bond
Independent

The 1818 Illinois gubernatorial election was held on September 17 through 19, 1818. It was the first election for governor in Illinois history. Shadrach Bond was the only serious candidate and won almost unanimously.

== General election ==
=== Candidates ===
- Shadrach Bond, former territorial delegate to the U.S. House of Representatives
- Henry Reavis

=== Results ===
1818 gubernatorial election, Illinois
Party	Candidate	Votes	%	±%
Independent	Shadrach Bond	3,828	98.99	N/A
Independent	Henry Reavis	19	1.01	N/A

== See also ==
- 1818 Illinois lieutenant gubernatorial election
