= 1818 Maryland gubernatorial election =

- December 14, 1818
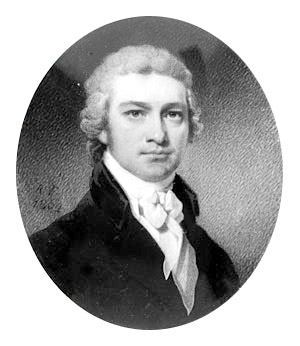

Nominee	Charles Goldsborough	Frisby Tilghman
Party	Federalist	Democratic-Republican
Popular vote	49	44
Percentage	52.69%	47.31%
Governor before election
Charles Carnan Ridgely
Federalist
Elected Governor
Charles Goldsborough
Federalist

The 1818 Maryland gubernatorial election was held on December 14, 1818, in order to elect the Governor of Maryland. Federalist nominee and former member of the U.S. House of Representatives from Maryland's 8th district Charles Goldsborough was elected by the Maryland General Assembly against Democratic-Republican nominee Frisby Tilghman.

== General election ==
On election day, December 14, 1818, Federalist nominee Charles Goldsborough was elected by the Maryland General Assembly, thereby retaining Federalist control over the office of governor. Goldsborough was sworn in as the 16th Governor of Maryland on January 8, 1819.

=== Results ===
Maryland gubernatorial election, 1818
Party	Candidate	Votes	%
Federalist	Charles Goldsborough	49	52.69
Democratic-Republican	Frisby Tilghman	44	47.31
Total votes		93	100.00
Federalist hold			
