= 1818 Connecticut lieutenant gubernatorial election =

- April 6, 1818
Nominee	Jonathan Ingersoll
Party	Toleration
Popular vote	14,390
Percentage	95.20%
Lieutenant Governor before election
Jonathan Ingersoll
Toleration
Elected Lieutenant Governor
Jonathan Ingersoll
Toleration

The 1818 Connecticut lieutenant gubernatorial election was held on April 6, 1818, in order to elect the lieutenant governor of Connecticut. Incumbent Toleration lieutenant governor Jonathan Ingersoll won re-election as he ran virtually unopposed.

== General election ==
On election day, April 6, 1818, incumbent Toleration lieutenant governor Jonathan Ingersoll won re-election with 95.20% of the vote, thereby retaining Toleration control over the office of lieutenant governor. Ingersoll was sworn in for his third term on May 14, 1818.

=== Results ===
Connecticut lieutenant gubernatorial election, 1818
Party	Candidate	Votes	%
Toleration	Jonathan Ingersoll (incumbent)	14,390	95.20
	Scattering	719	4.80
Total votes		15,109	100.00
Toleration hold			
