= Ellis Grove, Illinois =

Ellis Grove
- Village
- Location of Ellis Grove in Randolph County, Illinois.
- Coordinates: 38°00′34″N 89°54′36″W
- Country: United States
- State: Illinois
- County: Randolph

Area
  - Total: 0.49 sq mi (1.28 km^{2})
  - Land: 0.49 sq mi (1.27 km^{2})
  - Water: 0 sq mi (0.00 km^{2})
- Elevation: 568 ft (173 m)

Population (2020)
  - Total: 328
  - Density: 667.8/sq mi (257.83/km^{2})
- Time zone: UTC-6 (CST)
  - Summer (DST): UTC-5 (CDT)
- ZIP code: 62241
- Area code: 618
- FIPS code: 17-23503
- GNIS ID: 2398809
- Website: www.villageofellisgrove.com

Ellis Grove is a village in Randolph County, Illinois, United States. The population was 328 at the 2020 census.

== Geography ==
According to the 2010 census, Ellis Grove has a total area of 0.491 square miles (1.27 km^{2}), of which 0.49 square miles (1.27 km^{2}) (or 99.8%) is land and 0.001 square miles (0.00 km^{2}) (or 0.2%) is water.

== Demographics ==
Historical population
Census	Pop.	Note	%±
1900	280		—
1910	252		−10.0%
1920	269		6.7%
1930	226		−16.0%
1940	290		28.3%
1950	258		−11.0%
1960	218		−15.5%
1970	277		27.1%
1980	296		6.9%
1990	353		19.3%
2000	381		7.9%
2010	363		−4.7%
2020	328		−9.6%
U.S. Decennial Census 2020

As of the 2000 United States census, there were 381 people, 145 households, and 102 families residing in the village. The population density was 819.4 inhabitants per square mile (316.4/km^{2}). There were 149 housing units at an average density of 320.4 units per square mile (123.7 units/km^{2}). The racial makeup of the village was 99.21% White, 0.26% Native American, and 0.52% from two or more races.

There were 145 households, out of which 40.0% had children under the age of 18 living with them, 62.1% were married couples living together, 6.2% had a female householder with no husband present, and 29.0% were non-families. 26.2% of all households were made up of individuals, and 15.9% had someone living alone who was 65 years of age or older. The average household size was 2.63 and the average family size was 3.22.

In the village, the population was spread out, with 29.4% under the age of 18, 7.1% from 18 to 24, 28.1% from 25 to 44, 20.5% from 45 to 64, and 15.0% who were 65 years of age or older. The median age was 36 years. For every 100 females, there were 95.4 males. For every 100 females age 18 and over, there were 97.8 males.

The median income for a household in the village was $33,250, and the median income for a family was $42,750. Males had a median income of $36,667 versus $21,250 for females. The per capita income for the village was $14,527. About 5.9% of families and 8.3% of the population were below the poverty line, including 9.1% of those under age 18 and 2.9% of those age 65 or over.
