= Fort de Chartres =

- U.S. National Register of Historic Places
- U.S. National Historic Landmark
- Illinois State Historic Site
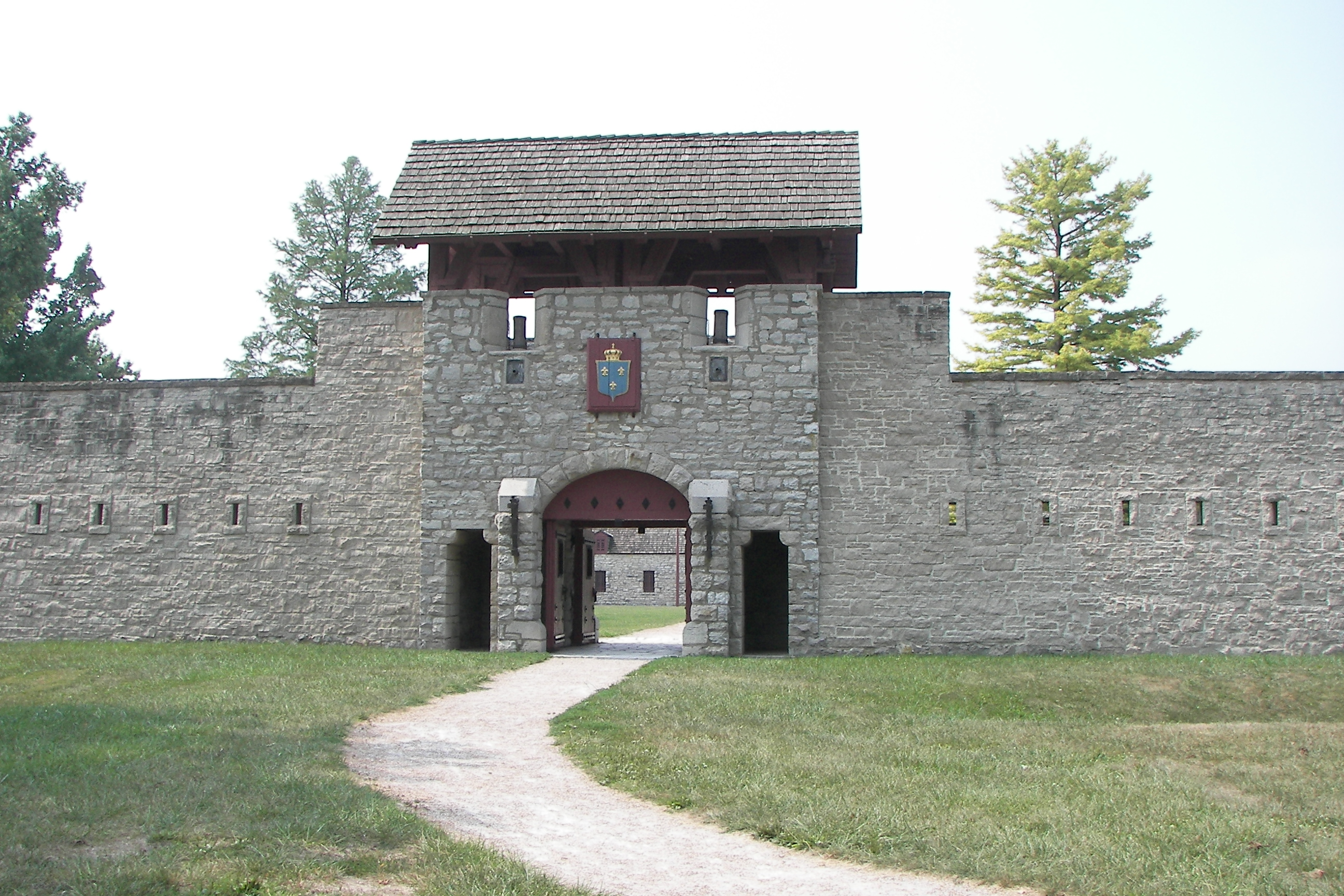
- Reconstructed gatehouse of Fort de Chartres

- Location within Illinois Location within the United States
- Location: Randolph County, Illinois, USA
- Nearest city: Prairie du Rocher, Illinois
- Coordinates: 38°05′05″N 90°09′30″W
- Area: American Bottom
- Built: 1720
- Architectural style: Colonial French Fortification
- Part of: French Colonial Historic District (ID74000772)
- NRHP reference No.: 66000329

Significant dates
- Added to NRHP: October 15, 1966
- Designated NHL: October 09, 1960

Fort de Chartres was a French fortification first built in 1720 on the east bank of the Mississippi River in present-day Illinois. It was used as the administrative center for the province, which was part of New France. Due generally to river flooding, the fort was rebuilt twice, the last time in limestone in the 1750s in the era of French colonial control over Louisiana and the Illinois Country.

The magazine (ammunition storehouse) of the fort is believed to be the oldest surviving building in Illinois. A partial reconstruction now exists of the limestone fort and the site is preserved as an Illinois state park, four miles (6 km) west of Prairie du Rocher in Randolph County, Illinois. Located on the floodplain area that became known as the American Bottom, the site is south of modern St. Louis. The forts were placed on the National Register of Historic Places and recognized as a National Historic Landmark on October 15, 1966. It was named one of the contributing properties to the French Colonial Historic District in 1974, along with other French-influenced sites such as the Creole House, the Pierre Menard House, the Kolmer Site (a former Indian village), and the site of Fort Kaskaskia.

The name of the fort honored Louis, duc de Chartres, son of the Regent of France. The state historic site today hosts several large re-enactments at the fort of colonial-era civil and military life each summer.

== History ==
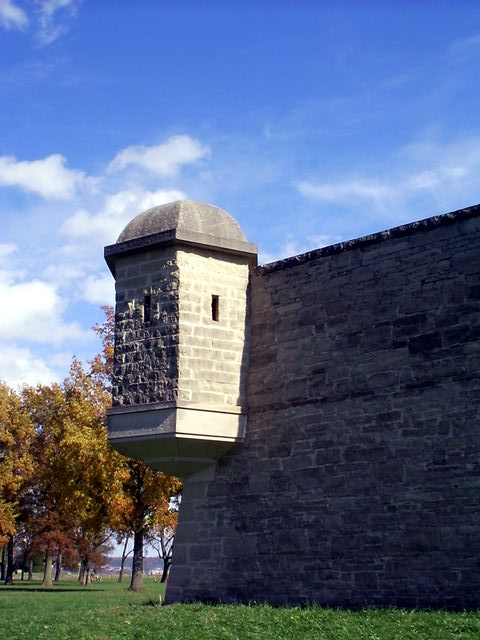
A bartizan at the corner of one of the reconstructed bastions

=== French rule ===
On January 1, 1718, the French government granted a trade monopoly to John Law and his Company of the West. Hoping to make a fortune mining precious metals, the company built a fort to protect its interests. The original wooden fort was built in 1718–1720 by a French contingent from New Orleans, led by Pierre Dugué de Boisbriant. When administration of the Illinois Country was moved from Quebec City to New Orleans, governance was transferred to the Company of the Indies. The fort was built to be the seat of government and to control the Indians of the region, particularly the Meskwaki. The original fort was a palisade of logs with two bastions at opposite corners.

Within five years, flooding from the Mississippi had left the original fort in bad condition. Construction of a second fort further from the river, but still on the flood plain, began in 1725. This fort was also made of logs and had a bastion at each of the four corners.

The second wooden fort deteriorated somewhat less rapidly but by 1742 was in bad repair. In 1747 the French garrison moved to the region's primary settlement 18 miles (29 km) to the south at Kaskaskia. The French debated where to rebuild the fort. When rule of the area reverted to the French crown in the 1730s, officials began to discuss construction of a stone fortress. The government in New Orleans wanted to move the garrison permanently to Kaskaskia, but the local commandant argued for a location near the original site.

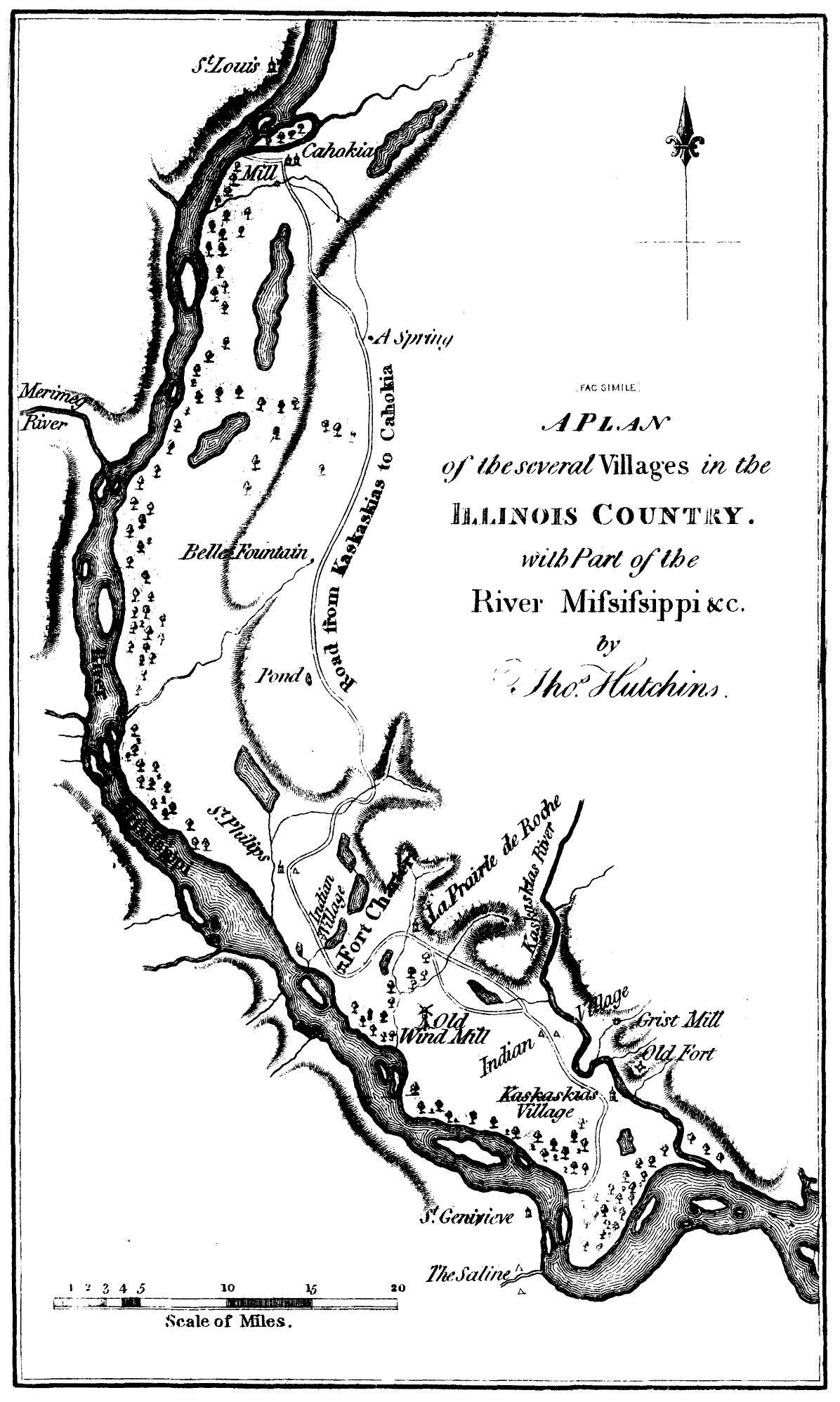
1778 map of the settlements near the fort in the Illinois County

The government decided to rebuild a fort in stone near the first forts rather than at Kaskaskia. Construction began in 1753 and was mostly completed in 1754. The limestone fort had walls 15-ft (3 m)-high and 3-ft (1 m)-thick, enclosing an area of 4 acres (16,000 m^{2}). The stone for construction was quarried in bluffs about two or three miles (4 km) distant and had to be ferried across a small lake.

In August 1751 Francois Saucier was summoned from Mobile to New Orleans by Governor Vaudreuil for a special assignment. This assignment was for the construction of a new fort to accommodate the garrison of additional troops that France was sending to the colony. The new fort was to replace the old wooden Fort de Chartres and was to be constructed of stone at the settlement. The main purpose of the new fort was to impress the warring Chickasaw Tribe of the area and to check and halt the progress of the British in the area. This new assignment required Francois to immediately journey to his new post in Illinois without the benefit of first returning home to Mobile for personal necessities.

The original intention of the French Government was for Francois and his crew to build the new stone Fort de Chartres in Kaskaskia. The Governor of the territory, Vaudreuil, eventually made the decision to leave the Fort where it stood. Due to problems of flooding it was decided to move it a little over one half mile north of the old fort. Upon arriving he took on the task of surveying the terrain, its situation and advantages, in order to make recommendations on construction. Once his plans were completed he sent them as instructed to the governor in New Orleans with all specifications and estimated costs. After some time of deliberations by the French government and many delays and discussions of the cost of construction as planned by Francois, a scaled down version of the fort was finally given approval and Francois was then given permission to start its construction. During this period of waiting for approval from France, preparations were being conducted by Francois and his crew of soldiers as he had been instructed by the governor for the forts construction, including clearing the land, felling of trees for timber and other site preparations. After the many earlier delays, the budget for building the new fort was finally approved and they proceed with the construction of Fort de Chartres.

=== British rule ===
In 1763 the Treaty of Paris was signed following the Seven Years' War (French and Indian War) and the French transferred control of the Illinois Country east of the Mississippi to Great Britain. (Spain had been granted the western part of the Illinois Country—also known as Upper Louisiana—in the 1762 Treaty of Fontainebleau.) The stone fort had served as center of French administration of the region for only twenty years.

The British had difficulty getting a regiment to their newly acquired fort, but on October 10, 1765, a small detachment of the 42nd Regiment of Foot commanded by Captain Thomas Stirling took control of the fort and surrounding area. The 42nd was shortly replaced by the 34th Foot. French Canadian settlers were ordered to leave or get a special license to remain. Many Canadien settlers moved to the more congenial culture of St. Louis. The 34th Regiment of Foot renamed the installation Fort Cavendish, after its colonel. However, the post was known as Ft. Chartres from 1768 on, after the 34th were replaced by the 18th Regiment of Foot under the command of Lt. Col. Wilkins. The British abandoned the post in May 1772 when the majority of the 18th Foot was ordered back to Philadelphia. A small party under Capt Hugh Lord remained at Kaskaskia until May 1776.

=== Ruin ===
The Mississippi continued to take its toll after the fort was abandoned. In 1772 the south wall and bastion fell into the river. The remaining walls deteriorated, and visitors noted trees growing in them by the 1820s. Locals carted away stones for construction over the years. By 1900 the walls were gone. The only part of the original fort that remained was the stone masonry powder magazine.

=== Reconstruction ===
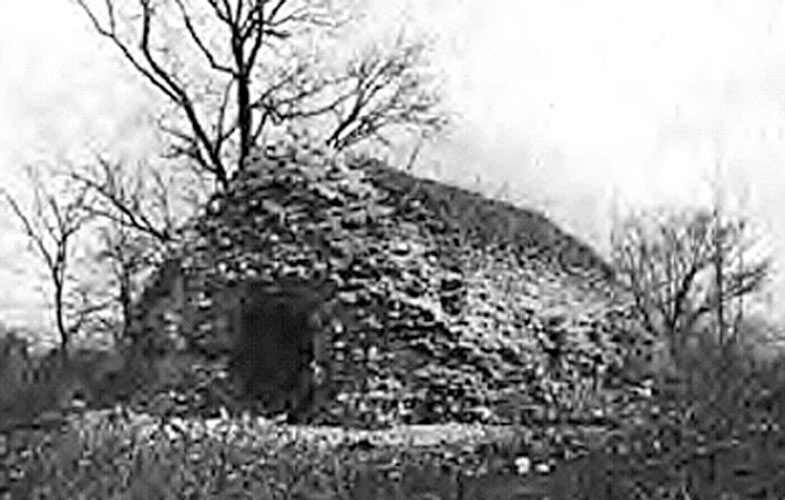
The fort's powder magazine prior to restoration, from photograph in 1906

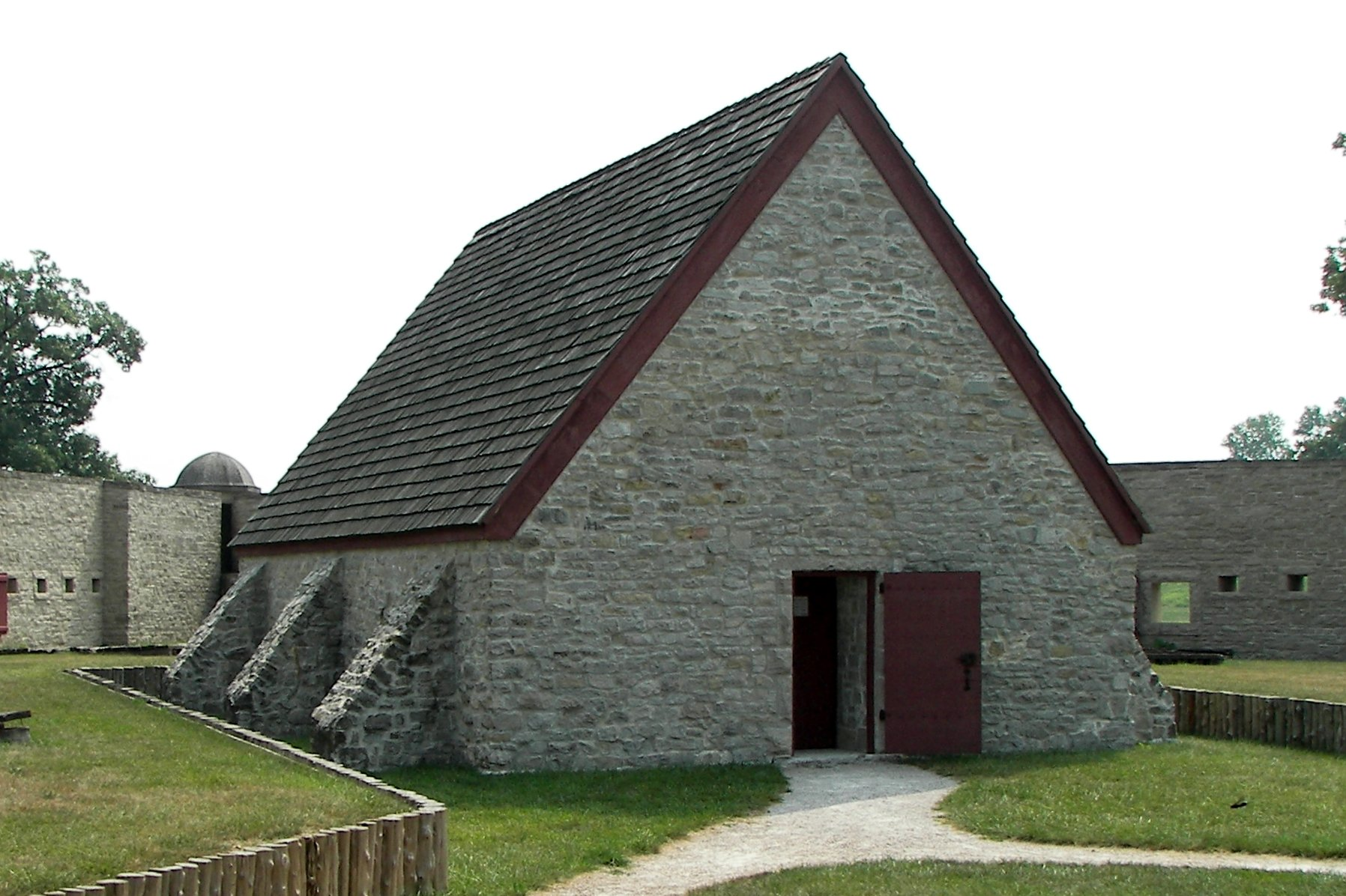
The fort's powder magazine, here restored, is thought to be the oldest standing building in Illinois.

The State of Illinois acquired the ruins in 1913 as a historic site and restored the powder magazine in 1917. The powder magazine is thought to be the oldest existing building in the state of Illinois. In the 1920s the foundations of the fort's buildings and walls were exposed. In the late 1920s and through the 1930s, the US WPA rebuilt the gateway and two stone buildings.

A combination museum and office building, constructed in 1928 on the foundation of an original fort building, houses exhibits depicting French life at Fort de Chartres. The large stone "Guards House", reconstructed in 1936, contains a Catholic chapel furnished in the style of the 1750s, along with a priest's room, a gunner's room, an officer-of-the-day room, and a guard's room. Also on the grounds are an operating bake oven, a garden shed built of upright logs in French Colonial poteaux-sur-sol (French: "post on sill") construction, and a kitchen garden with raised beds of produce typical of French 18th-century Illinois.

Partial reconstruction of the fort's walls on the original foundations followed in 1989. The frames of some additional buildings were erected as a display of the post-and-beam construction techniques used for the originals. Other buildings' foundations and cellars were exposed for educational display as well.

Today the site has a museum and small gift shop. It plays host each June to a Rendezvous that is said to be one of the largest and oldest in the country, celebrating frontier French and Indian culture.

The site is protected by modern levees, but the Mississippi River is still an occasional threat. The flood of 1993 breached the levee and sent waters fifteen feet deep to lap at the top of the walls.

== See also ==
- List of French forts in North America
