= Creole House =

Historic house in Illinois, United States

- U.S. National Register of Historic Places
- U.S. Historic district – Contributing property
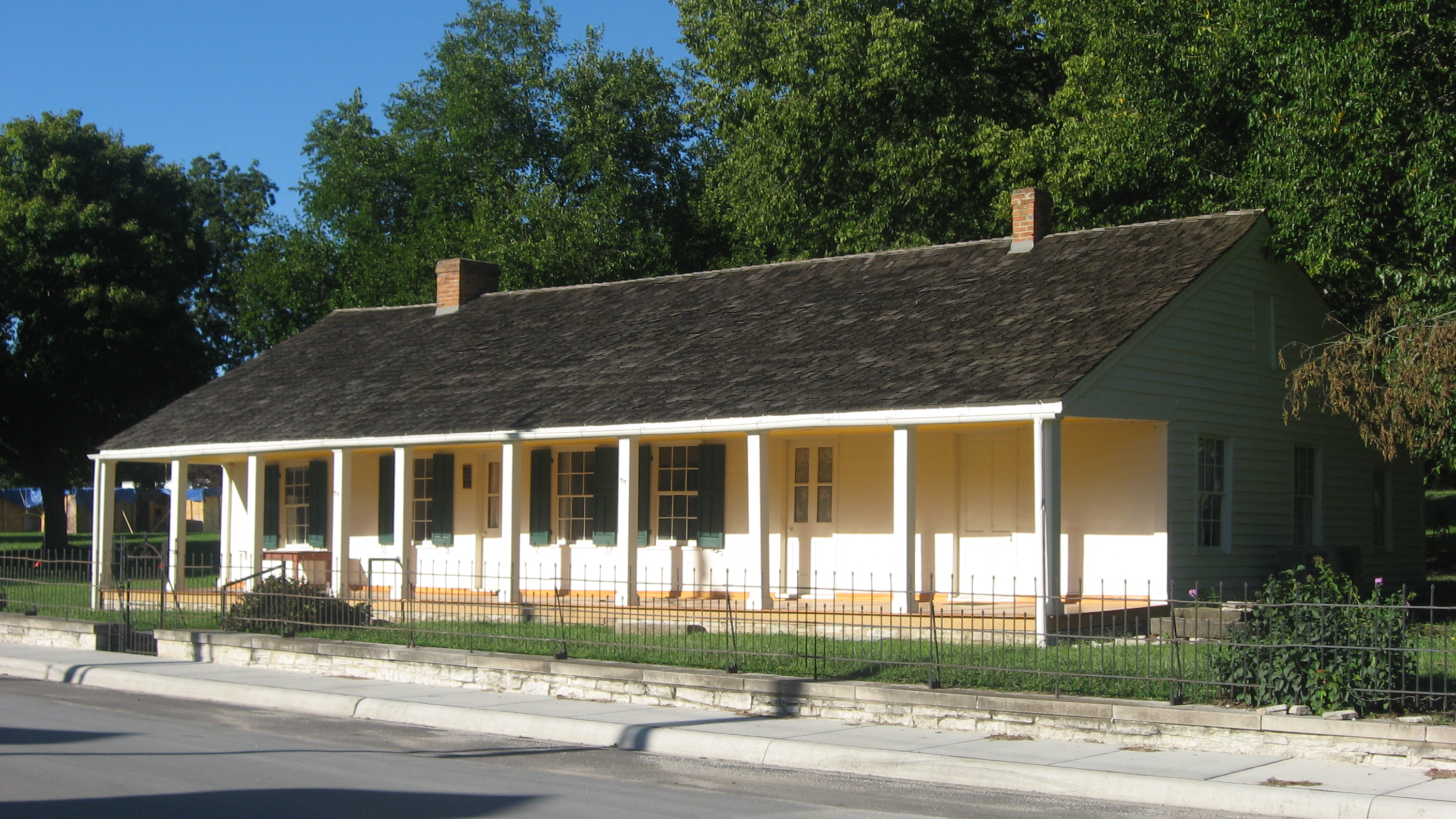
- Front and southern (older) end of the house

- Location within Illinois Location within the United States
- Location: Market St., Prairie du Rocher, Illinois
- Coordinates: 38°5′8″N 90°5′50″W
- Area: 1.7 acres (0.69 ha)
- Built: 1800
- Architectural style: Poteaux-sur-sol
- Part of: French Colonial Historic District (ID74000772)
- NRHP reference No.: 73000717
- Added to NRHP: April 3, 1973

The Creole House is a historic residence in the village of Prairie du Rocher, an old French settlement in present-day Randolph County, Illinois, United States. Built at the end of the eighteenth century and later expanded, the Creole House is the last survivor in Illinois of its type of vernacular architecture, and it forms an important part of the built environment of a portion of the Upper Mississippi Valley that possesses an unparalleled connection to the French settlement period.

== History ==
French settlers founded Prairie du Rocher circa 1722. At least twelve surviving houses in the village were built in the eighteenth century, including the Meilliere House, which was constructed in 1735. One of these is the Creole House, built around 1800, which was constructed in the French Colonial style by an unknown English-speaking immigrant from the eastern United States. The builder was one of Illinois' earliest American settlers; only about eight hundred Americans lived within the bounds of the present state of Illinois in 1800, including just one hundred within present-day Randolph County. From 1830 until 1848, it was owned by William Henry, a local miller, although starting in 1845 it was home to the family of E.C. Hansbrough. In 1848, the property passed into the ownership of Henry's son-in-law A.H. Lee, who owned it until it was obtained by F.W. Brickey in 1855. Brickey moved into the house around 1855, and three years later he arranged for the house to be doubled in size. His heirs owned the house for many decades, although by the 1930s, they were renting it instead of living there themselves. The house's most significant resident was Henry Clay Hansbrough; the son of E.C. Hansbrough, he grew up to be a nationally prominent Republican politician and a U.S. senator from North Dakota.

== Architecture ==
Although it was built by Americans, the Creole House is a typical example of a French colonial style known as poteaux-sur-sol, which is otherwise unknown in present-day Illinois. Such houses were constructed by erecting a palisade of logs on top of a stone foundation, rather than using horizontal beams or studs like more modern designs. While the roof is supported by oak beam rafters, the original roof no longer survives; it is presently composed of modern composite shingles. Atop the stone foundation, pine boards have been laid to form the floor, and the interior walls are plastered. Multiple fireplaces are placed in the various rooms, with wooden mantels around them.

The original portion of the house forms the southern half of the present structure; the northern half is the 1850s addition, which features a more modern stud-based form of construction. While the halves are separate from each other, the newer northern portion and older southern portion appear similar on the exterior, since both were sided when the northern portion was built. Because the shallow gabled roof extends past the western front of the house, it forms a large overhang that has been adapted into a long porch. The partially wooded lawn is surrounded by a fence of cast iron.

== Preservation ==
In 1973, the Creole House was listed on the National Register of Historic Places; it was the fourth Randolph County property to gain this distinction. The house qualified for inclusion on the Register because of its colonial architecture, as it is the only known original house of its type remaining in Illinois. By that time, it was no longer a residence; although vacant, it was owned by the Randolph County Historical Society, which was in the process of restoring it. One year after it was added to the National Register, much of Prairie du Rocher and the surrounding portions of the American Bottom were designated a historic district, the French Colonial Historic District, and listed on the National Register. Although the district included sites as varied as the remains of old Kaskaskia, the site of Fort de Chartres, and archaeological sites such as the historic Kolmer Site and the prehistoric Modoc Rock Shelter, the Creole House was deemed one of the district's core components. By designating the area a historic district, Illinois historic preservation officials hoped to highlight the significance of places such as the Creole House because of their connection to the strong French influence on the region. The house is still owned and used by the Randolph Historical Society, and periodically hosts historical events at the property.
