= Ruma, Illinois =

Ruma
- Village
- Location of Ruma in Randolph County, Illinois.
- Coordinates: 38°07′35″N 89°59′55″W
- Country: United States
- State: Illinois
- County: Randolph

Area
  - Total: 0.74 sq mi (1.92 km^{2})
  - Land: 0.74 sq mi (1.92 km^{2})
  - Water: 0 sq mi (0.00 km^{2})
- Elevation: 459 ft (140 m)

Population (2020)
  - Total: 313
  - Density: 422/sq mi (162.9/km^{2})
- Time zone: UTC-6 (CST)
  - Summer (DST): UTC-5 (CDT)
- ZIP code: 62278
- Area code: 618
- FIPS code: 17-66287
- GNIS feature ID: 2399141
- Website: www.villageofruma.com

Ruma is a village in Randolph County, Illinois, United States. As of the 2020 census, Ruma had a population of 313.

== Geography ==
According to the 2010 census, Ruma has a total area of 0.74 square miles (1.92 km^{2}), all land.

== Demographics ==
Historical population
Census	Pop.	Note	%±
1900	151		—
1910	138		−8.6%
1920	100		−27.5%
1930	79		−21.0%
1940	95		20.3%
1950	107		12.6%
1960	138		29.0%
1970	154		11.6%
1980	254		64.9%
1990	256		0.8%
2000	260		1.6%
2010	317		21.9%
2020	313		−1.3%
U.S. Decennial Census

As of the census of 2000, there were 260 people, 99 households, and 69 families residing in the village. The population density was 634.0 inhabitants per square mile (244.8/km^{2}). There were 103 housing units at an average density of 251.2 units per square mile (97.0 units/km^{2}). The racial makeup of the village was 98.85% White and 1.15% Asian.

There were 99 households, out of which 40.4% had children under the age of 18 living with them, 59.6% were married couples living together, 6.1% had a female householder with no husband present, and 29.3% were non-families. 26.3% of all households were made up of individuals, and 11.1% had someone living alone who was 65 years of age or older. The average household size was 2.63 and the average family size was 3.20.

In the village, the population was spread out, with 31.5% under the age of 18, 8.1% from 18 to 24, 32.3% from 25 to 44, 18.1% from 45 to 64, and 10.0% who were 65 years of age or older. The median age was 33 years. For every 100 females, there were 103.1 males. For every 100 females age 18 and over, there were 100.0 males.

The median income for a household in the village was $33,929, and the median income for a family was $38,333. Males had a median income of $31,346 versus $21,250 for females. The per capita income for the village was $16,176. About 13.2% of families and 13.6% of the population were below the poverty line, including 20.0% of those under the age of eighteen and none of those 65 or over.
