= Priscilla =

Prisca, Priscilla
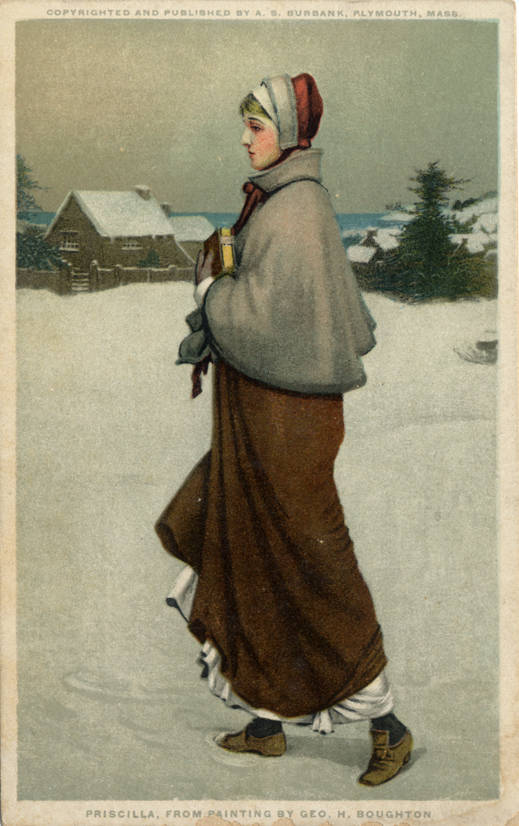
- Priscilla Alden, from a painting by George H. Boughton.
- Gender: Female

Origin
- Origin: Roman
- Meaning: venerable, ancient, classical, primordial

Other names
- Related names: Prisca

Priscilla is an English female given name adopted from Latin Prisca, derived from priscus.

The name first appears in the New Testament either as Priscilla or Prisca, a female leader in early Christianity. The name also appears along with Maximilla, referring to two female leaders of the Montanist movement of the 2nd century AD.

The name appears in English literature in Edmund Spenser's The Faerie Queene (1596), and was adopted as an English name by the Puritans in the 17th century.

It increased in usage in the United States in the 1930s due to the influence of actress Priscilla Lane and again in the late 1970s and early 1980s due to the influence of actress Priscilla Presley.

Notable people and characters with the name include:

== People ==
=== A ===
- Priscilla Abey (born 1999), Ugandan basketball player
- Priscilla Abwao (1924–2009), Kenyan activist
- Priscilla Achapka, Nigerian environmental activist
- Priscilla Agera (born 1978), Nigerian volleyball player
- Priscilla Opoku Agyeman (born 1991), Ghanaian actress and women's advocate
- Priscilla Ahn (born 1984), American musician
- Priscilla Alcantara (born 1996), Brazilian singer
- Priscilla Alden (1602–1685), Member of Massachusetts's Plymouth Colony of Pilgrims
- Priscilla Almodovar (born 1967), American chief executive
- Priscilla B. Anderson (born 1935), American politician
- Priscilla Atkins, Aboriginal Australian leader and television producer

=== B ===
- Priscilla Baird (1828–1904), American academic administrator
- Priscilla Baker, South African professor of analytical chemistry
- Priscilla Baltazar-Padilla (1958–2021), 188th Associate Justice of the Supreme Court of the Philippines
- Priscilla Baltimore, Abolitionist and social worker
- Priscilla Barnes (born 1954), American actress
- Priscilla Bertie, 21st Baroness Willoughby de Eresby (1761–1828), English Baroness
- Priscilla Betti (born 1989), French singer
- Priscilla Beukes, Namibian politician
- Priscilla Block (born 1995), American singer-songwriter
- Priscilla Fairfield Bok (1896–1975), American astronomer
- Priscilla Bonner (1899–1996), American actress
- Priscilla Bowman (1928–1988), American singer
- Priscilla Braislin (1838–1888), First mathematics professor at Vassar College
- Priscilla Buchan, Baroness Tweedsmuir of Belhelvie (1915–1978), British politician
- Priscilla Buckley (1921–2012), American journalist and author
- Priscilla Susan Bury (1799–1872), British botanist and artist
- Priscilla Buxton (1808-1852), British abolitionist

=== C ===
- Priscilla Carnaval (born 1993), Brazilian cyclist
- Priscilla Carrasco (born 1933), American photographer
- Priscilla Castillo
- Priscilla Cellona, Filipina film actress
- Priscilla Chan (singer) (born 1965), Hong Kong pop singer
- Priscilla Chan (born 1985), American pediatrician and philanthropist
- Priscilla Cherry (born 1971), Mauritian judoka
- Priscilla A. Clapp (born 1941), American diplomat
- Priscilla Cohn (1933–2019), American philosopher
- Priscilla Coleman (artist), American courtroom artist
- Priscilla K. Coleman, American psychologist and researcher
- Priscilla Coolidge (1940–2014), American singer
- Priscilla Crabb (1864–1931), New Zealand temperance activist
- Priscilla Cummings (born 1951), American author
- Priscilla Cushman, American physicist

=== D ===
- Priscilla Dean (1896–1987), American actress
- Priscilla Holmes Drake (1812–1892), American suffragist
- Priscilla Duffield (1918–2009), American secretary and office manager
- Priscilla Duncan (born 1983), New Zealand footballer
- Priscilla Dunn (1943–2024), American politician

=== E ===
- Priscilla Ekwere Eleje, Nigerian bank executive
- Priscilla Ernst (born 1971), Dutch speed skater

=== F ===
- Priscilla Faia (born 1985), Canadian actress
- Priscilla Falcón, Chicana activist in Colorado
- Priscilla Ford (1930–2005), American mass murderer
- Priscilla Frederick (born 1989), American-born Antiguan high jumper
- Priscilla Frisch (1943–2025), American astronomer

=== G ===
- Priscilla Gagné (born 1986), Canadian judoka
- Priscilla Galloway (1930–2018), Canadian children's literature author and English teacher
- Priscilla Hertati Lumban Gaol (born 1988), Indonesian martial artist
- Priscilla Garita (born 1968), American actress
- Priscilla Giddings (born 1983), American politician and pilot from Idaho
- Priscilla Gilman (born 1970), American writer and former college professor
- Priscilla Gneto (born 1991), French judoka
- Priscilla Ann Goslin, American graphic designer and author
- Priscilla Gurney (1757–1828), British Quaker minister
- Priscilla Guthrie, American government official

=== H ===
- Priscilla Hagan (born 1996), Ghanaian footballer
- Priscilla Hamby (born 1982), American illustrator and comic book artist
- Priscilla Hastings (1920–2010), British racehorse owner and trainer
- Priscilla Hayner, American human rights activist
- Priscilla Herdman (born 1948), American musician
- Priscilla Hernández (born 1984), Spanish singer-songwriter and fantasy illustrator
- Priscilla Hill (born 1961), American figure skater
- Priscilla Capps Hill (1900–1985), American philanthropist
- Priscilla Hiss (1903–1984), American wife of Alger Hiss
- Priscilla Hon (born 1998), Australian tennis player
- Priscilla Horton (1818–1895), English singer, actress and theatre manager
- Priscilla Hussey (1894–1946), American entomologist

=== I ===
- Priscilla Isaacs, South African politician
- Priscilla Mary Işın (born 1951), Turkish Ottoman-cuisine historian

=== J ===
- Priscilla Freeman Jacobs (born 1940), Waccamaw-Siouan chief
- Priscilla Jana (1943–2020), South African human rights lawyer

=== K ===
- Priscilla Nyokabi Kanyua, Kenyan politician
- Priscilla Kavita (1961–2021), Namibian politician
- Priscilla Kayira, Malawian radio broadcaster, presenter and television personality
- Priscilla Kemble (1756–1845), English actress
- Priscilla Kincaid-Smith (1926–2015), South African-born Australian physician and medical researcher
- Priscilla Krempl, Singaporean school principal and rugby referee
- Priscilla Kuye (born 1940), Nigerian lawyer

=== L ===
- Priscilla Lane (1915–1995), American actress
- Priscilla Laws (born 1940), American physics educator
- Priscilla Lawson (1914–1958), American actress
- Priscilla Leung (born 1960), Hong Kong barrister and politician
- Priscilla Levac, Canadian snowboarder
- Priscilla Lockwood (1936–2019), American politician
- Priscilla Long (born 1943), American writer and political activist
- Priscilla Lopes-Schliep (born 1982), Canadian hurdler
- Priscilla Lopez (born 1948), American singer, dancer, and actress
- Priscilla Lun (born 1990), American badminton player

=== M ===
- Priscilla Maaswinkel (born 1985), Dutch ten-pin bowler
- Priscilla Mamba (born 1972), Swazi long-distance runner
- Priscilla Tozama Mantashe (1960–2021), South African politician
- Priscilla Kolibea Mante, Ghanaian neuropharmacologist
- Priscilla Martins, Brazilian beauty pageant winner
- Priscilla Bright McLaren (1815–1906), British activist
- Priscilla McLean (born 1942), American classical composer
- Priscilla Johnson McMillan (1928–2021), American author and historian
- Priscilla Mead (born 1944), American politician
- Priscilla Meirelles (born 1983), Brazilian beauty pageant winner
- Priscilla Misihairabwi-Mushonga, Zimbabwean politician
- Priscilla Mitchell (1941–2014), American country music singer
- Priscilla Mokaba, South African political activist
- Priscilla Monge (born 1968), Costa Rican installation artist
- Priscilla Moran (1918–2006), American silent film actress
- Priscilla Morand (born 1993), Mauritian judoka
- Priscilla Morgan (born 1934), English actress
- Priscilla Morrill (1927–1994), American actress
- Priscilla Morris, British writer

=== N ===
- Priscilla Namingha (1924–2008), Hopi-Tewa potter
- Priscilla Napier (1908–1998), English writer
- Priscilla Nedd-Friendly, American film editor
- Priscilla Negrón (born 1984), Ecuadorian actress
- Priscilla Nelson, American academic administrator
- Priscilla Ng (born 1984), Hong Kong television journalist
- Priscilla Norman (1883–1964), British activist and suffragist
- Priscilla Nzimiro (1923–1951), Nigerian medical doctor

=== O ===
- Priscilla Okyere (born 1995), Ghanaian footballer
- Priscilla van Oorschot (born 1996), Dutch athlete
- Priscilla Otti (born 1970), First Lady of Abia State, Nigeria

=== P ===
- Priscilla Paetsch (1931–2017), American musician and composer
- Priscilla Paris (1945–2004), American singer
- Priscilla Hannah Peckover (1833–1931), English Quaker
- Priscilla Pemu, American physician
- Priscilla Pitts, New Zealand writer and curator
- Priscilla Pointer (1924–2025), American actress
- Priscilla Prado (born 1983), American politician
- Priscilla Presley (born 1945), American businesswoman and actress
- Priscilla (drag queen) (born 1976), Italian drag performer
- Priscilla (singer, born 1990), Brazilian singer, songwriter and dancer

=== Q ===
- Priscilla Quintana (born 1992), American actor, model

=== R ===
- Priscilla Ransohoff (1912–1992), American education specialist
- Priscilla Rattazzi (born 1956), Italian-born American photographer
- Priscilla Reining (1923–2007), American applied anthropologist
- Priscilla Reis (born 1990s), Brazilian actress
- Priscilla Reyntiens (1899–1991), British politician
- Priscilla Richman (born 1954), American judge
- Priscilla Dorsey Ridgely (1762–1814), First Lady of Maryland
- Priscilla Roberts (1916–2001), American artist
- Priscilla Robertson (1910–1989), American historian
- Priscilla Ruddle (born 1976), Australian volleyball player

=== S ===
- Priscilla Kepner Sage (born 1936), American textile and fiber artist
- Priscilla Schwartz (born 1967), Sierra Leonean lawyer
- Priscilla Scott-Ellis (1916–1983), British diarist
- Priscilla Sekgobela (born 1957), South African politician
- Priscilla Settee (born 1948), Cree activist
- Priscilla Shirer (born 1974), American author and motivational speaker
- Priscilla Shunmugam (born 1981), Singaporean fashion designer
- Priscilla Slade, American university administrator
- Priscilla J. Smith, American attorney
- Priscilla Hollister Starrett, American herpetologist
- Priscilla Steenbergen (born 1998), Dutch darts player
- Priscilla Studd (1864–1929), British Protestant missionary

=== T ===
- Priscilla Tapia (born 1991), Costa Rican footballer
- Priscilla Taylor (born 1976), American model and actress
- Priscilla Taylor (politician) (born 1949), American politician
- Priscilla Jane Thompson (1871–1942), American poet and public reader
- Priscilla Reuel Tolkien (1929–2022), British literary preservationist
- Priscilla Tyler (educator), US educator and scholar of composition and world literature
- Priscilla Cooper Tyler (1816–1889), First Lady of the United States from 1842 to 1844
- Priscilla Tyson (born 1955), Former Columbus Councilwoman

=== U ===
- Priscilla Ikos Usiobaifo, Nigerian feminist and gender rights advocate

=== V ===
- Priscilla de Villiers, Canadian politician
- Priscilla de Vos, Dutch football player

=== W ===
- Priscilla Wadsworth (born 2000), American pencil artist
- Priscilla Wakefield (1751–1832), English Quaker and writer
- Priscilla Wald (born 1958), American English professor and literary critic
- Priscilla Weems (born 1972), American-born actress and singer
- Priscilla Wehi, New Zealand ethnobiologist
- Priscilla Welch (born 1944), British marathon runner
- Priscilla Fane, Countess of Westmorland (1793–1879), British linguist and artist
- Priscilla White (physician) (1900–1989), American diabetologist (1900–1989)
- Priscilla Williams, South African politician
- Priscilla Wong (born 1981), Hong Kong actress and television host
- Priscilla A. Wooten (1936–2017), American politician
- Priscilla Wright (singer) (born 1940), Canadian singer

=== Y ===
- Priscilla Young (1925–2006), English social worker

== Fictional characters ==
- Priscilla "Pris" Stratton, from the 1982 film Blade Runner
- Priscilla Kelly, in the soap opera The Bold and the Beautiful

== See also ==
- Priscila (disambiguation), an alternative spelling of Priscilla
- List of biblical names
