= Priscilla (disambiguation) =

Priscilla is a feminine given name.

Priscilla may also refer to:

== Music ==
=== People ===
- Priscilla (singer, born 1996), Brazilian singer Priscilla Alcantara
- Priscilla (singer, born 1990), Brazilian singer Priscilla Florencio
- Priscilla (French singer) (born 1989), Priscilla Betti

=== Albums ===
- Priscilla (album), a 2002 album by the French singer Priscilla

=== Songs ===
- "Priscilla", a song from the 2014 album Platinum by Miranda Lambert
- "Priscilla", a song on the 1983 album Midnight at the Lost and Found by Meat Loaf
- "Priscilla", a 1971 song by Phil Pickett
- "Priscilla" (Eddie Cooley song), 1957
- "Priscilla", a 1981 song by Yellowjackets, Jimmy Haslip, Robben Ford, Chris Palmaro
- "Priscilla", a song from the 2001 album Songs in Red and Gray by Suzanne Vega

== Ships ==
- Priscilla (sloop), a U.S. National Historic Landmark built in 1888 and berthed in West Sayville, New York
- USS Priscilla (SP-44), the proposed designation of a United States Navy auxiliary schooner acquired in 1917, but never commissioned

== Other uses ==
- List of storms named Priscilla, several tropical cyclones worldwide
- The Adventures of Priscilla, Queen of the Desert, a 1994 Australian film
- Priscilla (beetle), a genus of beetles in the family Cerambycidae
- Priscilla (film), a 2023 film about Priscilla Presley
- 2137 Priscilla, an asteroid
- a small lunar crater near the crater Davy
- Priscilla, a nuclear test blast in 1957, part of the American Operation Plumbbob

== See also ==
- Priscila, a list of people with a slightly different spelling of the given name
- "Prescilla" (song), by Bat for Lashes in 2006
