= Joseph Henry (disambiguation) =

Joseph Henry (1797–1878) was an American scientist.

Joseph Henry may also refer to:

- Joseph Henry (politician) (1853–1894), New Zealand Member of Parliament
- Joe Henry (born 1960), Grammy-award-winning American musician
- Joe Henry (baseball) (1930–2009), American baseball player
- The Joseph Henry, a mine-planting ship of the U.S. Army
- Joseph Henry Press, an American publisher named after the scientist
- Joseph Henry (soul singer), (?-2005) American soul singer
