= Lamb Site =

Archaeological site in the Illinois River Valley

The Lamb Site (11SC24) is an archeological site located in the central Illinois River Valley (CIRV). Excavations of this site began in the 1990s to attempt to understand the Mississippinization of the area following several generations after the intervention of the Cahokians before Columbus's discovery of America. During the eleventh and twelfth centuries A.D., changes amongst the Native American groups in the Midwest erupted in an attempt to conform to the growing Mississippian lifestyle. These changes were apparent in their cosmology practices and in their maintenance of social, political and economic systems.

== History of Site ==
=== Geographic Location & Environment Type ===
The Lamb site, located within the CIRV, is primarily composed of oak-hickory forests and prairie lands. The soil in the area is ideal for agriculture and includes the growth many different kinds of fruits as well as maize. The climate of the area can be described as temperate with an average level of rainfall per year.

=== Cahokia Culture & Mississipianization ===
Cahokia is located in the American Bottom of the Mississippi River. It was one of the largest and most politically complex groups of Native Americans in the U.S. prior to Columbus's arrival. From about 1050 - 1100 A.D., Cahokia experienced changes in their political structures, social hierarchies and architecture. Previous excavations indicate that public and residential areas became separated and established. This new planning of layouts in residential areas were accompanied by new means of construction and advancements in technologies. This resulted in a difference of how houses, building structures and ceramic pottery were created. To name a few changes: houses were constructed using wall trenches, shell temper was used more frequently, jars were created with different shoulders and lips. Additionally, these advancements and changes led to intensification of social stratification. The changes in the societal structures of the Cahokians then resulted in the migration of the people northward and as this migration continued, traditions of these people began to change with the core premise of them remaining the same.

== Excavation ==
In the 1990s, excavations were done by archaeologists Glenn and Mary Hanning that yielded several material artifacts as well as ecofacts in 2 separate areas with a total of 33 features. Their excavation was described as a salvage excavation because the site was initially found due to construction by Lafe and Dorothy Lamb, putting it at a high risk for possible destruction of anything that may have been preserved. The 33 features that were presented on the site plan map were excavated, however, the fills that were at the various areas of the site were not screened any further. Besides excavation of the features, archaeologists also found artifacts from the ground surface. Several things were uncovered from the site itself, including material items that served as tools and ceramics as well as botanical and faunal remains.

=== Ceramics ===
Ceramics that were found through excavations of the Lamb Site, indicated influence from Mississipianization, retention of local Bauer Branch creation and hybridization of both cultures. 63% of the potsherds that were found were reminiscent of the style that Cahokians used to create their ceramics and vessels. 35% of the remaining potsherds that were found retained their Bauer Branch influence and less than 1% of the potsherds were identified as having a hybrid of styles.

=== Features ===
Pit features and food storage areas were found during excavation on the site. Upon inspection, the pits had traces of oxidation as well as fire-cracked rocks. These characteristics provide evidence that the pits were used as roasting pits or earth ovens.

Food storages were found separate from living areas and arranged around the pits that were used to cook food. Pits appeared to be deep and in clusters with others to hold large amounts of food, namely foods like maize.

=== Analysis ===
Analysis of both artifacts and features of the Lamb Site indicate that although inhabitants of the Lamb Site were influenced by the Cahokians, many of their traditions and societal structures remained the same.

When looking at housing structures of the area, there is no indication of structures being separated as they were through the Mississippianization of the Cahokians. Ceramic structures and vessels were created to imitate that of the Cahokians, however, the use of them did not change from traditional usage, e.g., servingware and food processing. Researchers suggest that this is could be due to traveling of inhabitants to Cahokia land and bringing back influence of their ceramic work or influence from the migration and spread of Cahokian culture to be connected with them. There is little indication of trade occurring between the two peoples, therefore, some believe that this is not as likely of a reasoning for similarities in ceramics.

The pit features that were used for cooking purposes and the food storages appear to show that preparation and cooking of food was a communal act, rather than one that occurred in individual households. The size of the central earth oven on the site as well as the abundance of deep storages led researchers to believe that food was made on a large scale as has been documented through historical records. These features show a lack of Mississippian influence on the inhabitants of the site because Cahokians at the time were beginning to privatize many of their activities, making them individual. Rather than having cooking pits and food storage in public spaces, they had been moved inside residences or into private spaces. These findings in the Lamb site also are consistent with the areas surrounding it.

It is still debated whether or not these changes at the Lamb site were a direct result of contact, but influence from the Cahokians is apparent.

== Significance ==
The Lamb site and other locations within the CIRV are of particular interest to archaeologists because of their connections to the Cahokians. Understanding the influence that Cahokians had on surrounding areas in the midwest allow researchers to be able to analyze the complexity of the political and social structures that were present prior to Columbus.
