= MC Niack =

Brazilian musician

- Born: Davi Alexandre Magalhães de Almeida; 2002 or 2003 (age 23–24); Ribeirão Preto, São Paulo, Brazil
- Occupations: Singer; songwriter
- Years active: 2017–present
- Musical career
- Genres: Funk, Pop
- Instrument: Vocals

Davi Alexandre Magalhães de Almeida (born 2002 or 2003), professionally known as MC Niack, is a Brazilian singer, known for his hits "Oh Juliana" and "Na Raba Toma Tapão", which were number # 1 on the Spotify chart Brazil. Niack was the artist who spent the longest time at the top of the Brazilian Spotify chart in 2020, staying 95 days in the lead, in the same year he became the first Brazilian to enter the Billboard Global 200 chart. In September 2020, Niack signed to Warner Music. Niack's biggest hit "Oh Juliana" reached 247 million views on YouTube.

== Career ==
In May 2020, Niack and Markin WF reached the top of the Spotify Brasil chart with the track "Na Raba Toma Tapão", in September the singer scored the hit "Oh Juliana" at the top of the chart Spotify Brasil, the song also entered the Spotify Global chart. Oh Juliana reached 62nd position on the Billboard Global Excl chart. U.S. charts and appeared on the Billboard Global 200 chart. Also in September, Niack signed on to Warner Music. In February 2021, Niack released "Nervozinha" in partnership with MC Kekel for KondZilla, who also produced the video for "Oh Juliana", in the same month launched his first international collaboration "Vida", in partnership with American rapper Maejor and Mexican singer Sofia Reys. In February 2023, Niack collaborated with Brazilian singer Priscilla on the single "Molhadinha," released under Virgin Music Brasil. The track blends elements of funk carioca and pop, showcasing Niack's versatility in the Brazilian music scene.

== Singles ==
- "Na Rab* Tom* Tap*"
- "Oh Juliana"
- "Nervosinha" (feat. MC Kekel)
- "Vida" (feat. Maejor e Sofia Reys)
- "Prepara"
- "To Tranquilão"
- "Futuro"
- "Colocada Forte"
- "Vem na Tremidinha"
- "Molhadinha" (feat Priscilla)
