= Carioca =

Demonym for anything related to the city of Rio de Janeiro, Brazil

Carioca (Brazilian Portuguese pronunciation: [kaɾiˈɔkɐ]) is a demonym used to refer to residents of the city of Rio de Janeiro, in Brazil and their culture.

Like other Brazilians, Cariocas speak Portuguese. The carioca accent and sociolect (also simply called "carioca", see below) are one of the most widely recognized in Brazil, in part because TV Globo, the most popular TV network in Brazil, is headquartered in Rio de Janeiro. Thus, many Brazilian TV programs, from news and documentary to entertainment (such as the telenovelas), feature carioca-acting and -speaking talent.

== Etymology ==
Carioca derives from Old Tupi and means "Carijó house". The interpretation of Carioca as "white man house", according to Frederico Edelweiss, is inadmissible, and anyone who interprets the name this way "understands little or nothing" of Tupi.

== History ==
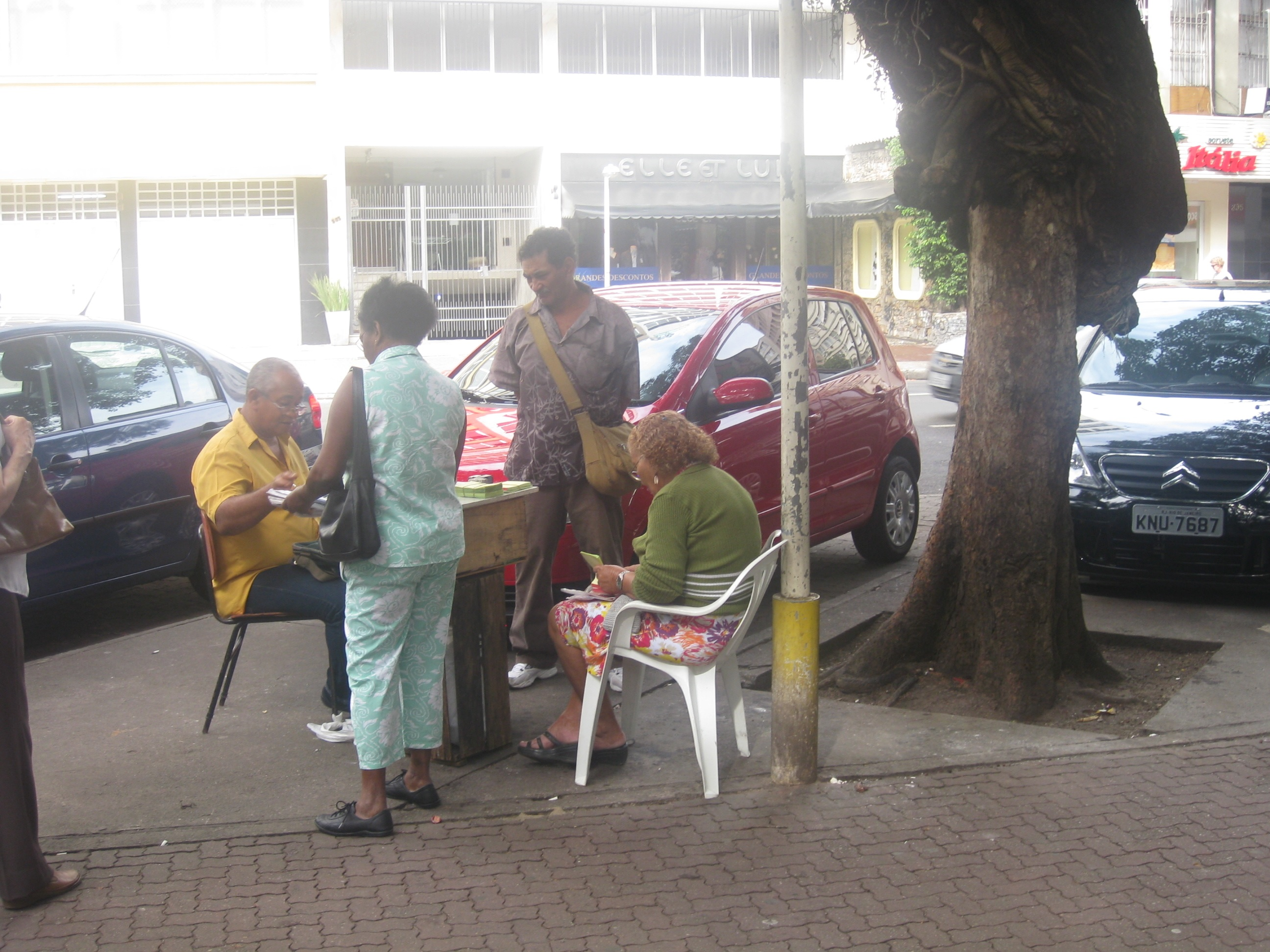
Cariocas

The archaic demonym for the state of Rio de Janeiro is Fluminense, taken from the Latin word flūmen, meaning "river". Despite the fact that Carioca is a more ancient demonym of Rio de Janeiro's inhabitants (known since 1502), it was replaced by fluminense in 1783, when the latter was sanctioned as the official demonym of the Royal Captainship of Rio de Janeiro (later the Province of Rio de Janeiro).

In 1763, the colonial capital of Brazil was transferred from Salvador to Rio de Janeiro. From 1783 and during the rest of the colonial period and then the independent empire, Carioca remained only as a nickname by which other Brazilians called the inhabitants of Rio (city and province). During the first years of the Brazilian Republic, Carioca was the name given to those who lived in the slums or a pejorative way to refer to the bureaucratic elite of the Federal District.

In 1960, when Brazil’s capital and the Federal District were transferred from Rio de Janeiro to newly built Brasília, the city of Rio de Janeiro was reorganized as the state of Guanabara. During this transition, Carioca was recognized as a co-official demonym alongside Guanabarino, both referring to residents of the former capital.

In 1975, during the presidency of Ernesto Geisel under Brazil’s military dictatorship, the State of Guanabara was merged with the neighboring State of Rio de Janeiro. Following the merger, the city of Rio de Janeiro replaced Niterói as the capital of the unified state, and Carioca became the official demonym for inhabitants of the city.

Nowadays, Carioca is used to exclusively refer to those born in the city of Rio de Janeiro, while everyone born in the state of Rio de Janeiro is referred to as a Fluminense.

== Accomplishments and influence ==
Carioca people have invented a few sports; the most famous is footvolley.

Cariocas are credited with creating the bossa nova style of music.

Famous Cariocas in film include "Brazilian bombshell" Carmen Miranda, a Portuguese-born Brazilian woman who grew up in Rio de Janeiro. The eponymous song "Carioca", from the 1933 film Flying Down to Rio, has become a jazz standard.

Carnaval Carioca is the Portuguese name for the largest Brazilian Carnival, the Rio Carnival.

Samba Carioca is a localized style of Brazilian Samba.

How to be a Carioca by Priscilla Ann Goslin provides advice to visitors to the city on how to fit in with the local culture and lifestyle. It has sold over 350,000 copies since being first published in 1992 and provided the inspiration for a Portuguese television series of the same name that was released in 2023.

There is an exercise drill used for dynamic stretching called Carioca. It consists of a repeating Samba dance step.

== Sociolect ==
Carioca
- Carioca, sotaque
- Pronunciation: Portuguese pronunciation: [kaɾiˈɔkɐ] or [kɐɾiˈɔkɐ]
- Region: Rio de Janeiro
- Language family: Indo-European: Italic; Romance; Western Romance; Ibero-Romance; West-Iberian; Galician-Portuguese; Portuguese; Brazilian Portuguese; Carioca
- Writing system: Portuguese alphabet

Language codes
- ISO 639-3: –
- IETF: pt-u-sd-brrj

The Portuguese spoken across the states of Rio de Janeiro and Espírito Santo and neighboring towns in Minas Gerais (and to a certain extent the city of Florianópolis), has similar features, hardly different from one another so cities such as Paraty, Resende, Campos dos Goytacazes, Cachoeiro de Itapemirim, Vila Velha and Linhares may be said to have the same dialect as Rio de Janeiro, as they are hardly perceived as strong regional variants by people from other parts of Brazil.

The Brazilian Portuguese variant spoken in the city of Rio de Janeiro (and metropolitan area) is called Carioca, and it is called Sotaque locally, literally translated as "accent". It can be said that Rio de Janeiro presents a sociolect inside the major Fluminense dialect group, as speakers inside the city may be easily recognizable more by their slang than the way the phonology of their speech. It is known especially for several distinctive traits new to either variant (European or Brazilian) of the Portuguese language:

1. (for Brazilians) Coda /s/ and /z/ can be pronounced as palato-alveolar [ʃ] and [ʒ] of English or the alveolo-palatal [ɕ] and [ʑ] of Catalan. That is inherited from European Portuguese, and Carioca shares it only with Florianopolitano and some other Fluminense accents. In the northern tones of Brazilian Portuguese, not all coda /s/ and /z/ become postalveolar.
2. (for Europeans) /ʁ/, as well what would be coda /ɾ/ (when it is not pre-vocalic) in European Portuguese, may be realized as various voiceless and voiced guttural-like sounds, most often the latter (unlike in other parts of Brazil), and many or most of them can be part of the phonetic repertory of a single speaker. Among them the velar and uvular fricative pairs, as well both glottal transitions (voiced & unvoiced), the voiceless pharyngeal fricative and the uvular trill: [x], [ɣ] (between vowels), [χ], [ʁ], [h], [ɦ], [ħ] and [ʀ]. That diversity of allophones of a single rhotic phoneme is rare not just in Brazilian Portuguese but among world languages.
3. (for both) The consonants /t/ and /d/ before /i/ or final unstressed /ɛ ~ e/ ([e̞], that in this position may be raised to [i] or deleted) become affricates [tʃ ~ tɕ] and [dʒ ~ dʑ] (again, as those of English or Catalan, depending on the speaker), respectively. Originally probably from Tupi influence, through the Portuguese post-creole that appeared in southeastern Brazil after the ban of Língua Geral Paulista as a marker of Jesuit activity by the Marquis of Pombal, this is now common place in Brazilian Portuguese, as it spread with the Bandeiras Paulistas, expansion of Mineiros to the Center-West and mass media. It is not as universal in São Paulo, Espírito Santo and southern Brazil even though they were populated mostly by the original bandeirantes (caboclos, formerly Língua Geral speakers) because the European immigrants learning Portuguese and their descendants preferred more conservative registers of the language, perhaps as a mark of a separate social identity. The Northeast had Nheengatu, another Língua Geral, too, but it had a greater native Portuguese-speaker presence, had a greater contact with the colonial metropolis and was more densely populated.
4. (for both) Historical [ɫ] (/l/ in syllable coda), which merged with coda /ɾ/ ([ɻ]) in Caipira, has undergone labialization to [lʷ], and then vocalized to [u̯]; Nevertheless, with the exception of [ʊ̯] being used in Southern Brazil and São Paulo instead of [u̯], both commonly transcribed as [w], the process is now nearly ubiquitous in Brazilian Portuguese so only some areas retain velarized lateral alveolar approximant (rural areas close to the frontier with Uruguay) or the retroflex approximant (a very few caipira areas) as coda /l/.

The traits (particularly the chiado, a palatalization process that creates a postalveolar pronunciation of coda s and z and affricate pronunciation of [ti] and [di] and te and de rhymes), as a whole and consistent among the vast majority of speakers, were once specifically characteristic of Rio de Janeiro speech and distinguished particularly from the pronunciation of São Paulo and areas further south, which formerly had adapted none of the characteristics. The chiado of the coda sibilant is thought to date from the early 1800s occupation of the city by the Portuguese royal family, as European Portuguese had a similar characteristic for the postalveolar codas.

More recently, however, all of the traits have spread throughout much of the country by the cultural influence of the city that diminished the social marker character the lack of palatalization once had (a part of assimilation of the caboclo minorities in most of South and Southeast Brazil). Affrication is today widespread, if not nearly omnipresent among young Brazilians, and coda guttural r is also found nationwide but less among speakers in the 5 southernmost states other than Rio de Janeiro, and if accent is a good social indicator, 95-105 million Brazilians consistently palatalize coda sibilant in some instances (but as in Rio de Janeiro, it is only a marker of adoption of foreign phonology at large in Florianópolis and Belém: palatalization, as in any other Romance language, is a very old process in Portuguese and its lacking in some dialect rather than reflecting a specific set of Galician, Spanish and indigenous influences on their formation).

Another common characteristic of Carioca speech is, in a stressed final syllable, the addition of /j/ before coda /s/ (mas, dez may become [majʃ], [dɛjʃ], which can also be noted ambiguously as [mɐ̞ⁱʃ], [dɛⁱʃ]). The change may have originated in the Northeast, where pronunciations such as Jesus [ʒeˈzujs] have long been heard. Also immigration from Northeastern Brazil and Spanish immigration causes debuccalization of the coda sibilant: mesmo [meɦmu]. Many Brazilians assume that is specific to Rio, but in the Northeast, debuccalization has long been a strong and advanced phonological process that may also affect onset sibilants /s/ and /z/ as well as other consonants, primarily [v].

There are some grammatical characteristics of this sociolect as well, an important one is the mixing of second person pronouns você and tu, even in the same speech. For instance, while normative Portuguese requires lhe as the oblique for você and te as oblique for tu, in Carioca slang, the once formal você (now widespread as an informal pronoun in many Brazilian Portuguese varieties) is used for all cases. In informal speech, the pronoun tu is retained, but with the verb forms belonging to the form você: Tu foi na festa? ("Did you go to the party?"). So the verbal forms are the same for both você and tu.

Many Cariocas and many Paulistas (from the coast, capital city or hinterland) shorten você and use cê instead: Cê vai pra casa agora? ("Are you going home now?"). That, however, is common only on the spoken language and is rarely written.

Slang words among youngsters from Rio de Janeiro include caraca! (gosh!) [now spread throughout Brazil], e aê? and qualé/quaé/coé? (literally "which is [it]", carrying a meaning similar to "What's up?"), maneiro ("cool", "fine", "interesting", "amusing"), mermão ("bro", contraction of meu irmão), caô (a lie), and sinistro (in standard Portuguese, "sinister"; in slang, "awesome," "terrific," but also "terrible," "troublesome," "frightening," "weird"). Many of these slang words can be found in practically all of Brazil by to cultural influence from the city. Much slang from Rio de Janeiro spreads across Brazil and may be not known as originally from there, and those less culturally accepted elsewhere are sometimes used to shun not only the speech of a certain subculture, age group or social class but also the whole accent.

== Bibliography ==
- Anchieta, José de (2006). Navarro, Eduardo de Almeida (ed.). Teatro [Theater]. Dramaturgos do Brasil (in Portuguese) (2nd ed.). São Paulo: Martins Fontes. ISBN 85-336-2142-6.
- Bisol, Leda (2005), "Introdução a estudos de fonologia do português brasileiro", Editora EDIPUCRS (4th ed.), Porto Alegre - Rio Grande do Sul, ISBN 978-85-7430-529-5
- Edelweiss, Frederico (1967). "Os topônimos indígenas do Rio de Janeiro quinhentista" [The Indigenous toponyms of 16th-century Rio de Janeiro]. Revista do Instituto Histórico e Geográfico Brasileiro (in Portuguese). 275. Rio de Janeiro: Departamento de Imprensa Nacional: 80–134.
- Lery, Iean de (1578). Chuppin, Antoine (ed.). Histoire d'un voyage fait en la terre du Bresil, autrement dite Amerique [History of a voyage made in the land of Brazil, otherwise called America] (in Middle French).
- Navarro, Eduardo de Almeida (2005). Método moderno de tupi antigo: a língua do Brasil dos primeiros séculos [Modern Method of Old Tupi: the language of Brazil of the first centuries] (in Portuguese) (3rd ed.). São Paulo: Global. ISBN 85-260-1058-1.
- Navarro, Eduardo de Almeida (2013). Dicionário de tupi antigo: a língua indígena clássica do Brasil [Dictionary of Old Tupi: the classical Indigenous language of Brazil ] (in Portuguese) (1st ed.). São Paulo: Global. ISBN 978-85-260-1933-1.
