= Priscila =

Priscila is a feminine given name. It may refer to:

- Priscila Borja (born 1985), Spanish footballer
- Priscila Bosio (born 1994), Argentine volleyball player
- Priscila Cachoeira (born 1988), Brazilian mixed martial arts fighter
- Priscila Chinchilla (born 2001), Costa Rican footballer
- Priscila Daroit (born 1988), Brazilian volleyball player
- Priscila De Carvalho (born 1975), Brazilian-born American contemporary artist
- Priscila Fantin (born 1983), Brazilian actress
- Priscila Faria de Oliveira (born 1982), Brazilian footballer
- Priscila Flor da Silva (born 2004), Brazilian footballer
- Priscila Jardel (born 1996), Argentine field hockey player
- Priscila Krause (born 1978), Brazilian journalist
- Priscila Machado (born 1986), Brazilian TV host and model
- Priscila Marques (born 1978), Brazilian judoka
- Priscila Navarro (born 1994), Peruvian pianist
- Priscila Oliveira (born 1992), Brazilian volleyball player
- Priscila Ortiz (born 1996), Salvadoran footballer
- Priscila Perales (born 1983), Mexican actress and spokesperson
- Priscila Rezende (born 1985), Brazilian performance artist
- Priscila Senna (born 1990), Brazilian singer and songwriter
- Priscila Sol (born 1980), Brazilian actress
- Priscila Sousa, American politician
- Priscila Tommy (born 1991), ni-Vanuatu table tennis player

== See also ==
- Priscilla (disambiguation)
