= Peter Mokaba =

South African politician (1959–2002)

- Born: January 7, 1959; Near Pietersburg, South Africa
- Died: June 9, 2002 (aged 43); Johannesburg, South Africa

Peter Mokaba, OLS (7 January 1959 – 9 June 2002) was a member of the South African parliament, deputy minister in the government of Nelson Mandela and president of the South African governing party's youth wing, the ANC Youth League. The Peter Mokaba Stadium, a Polokwane stadium used for the 2010 FIFA World Cup, was named after him.

He was a friend of Winnie Madikizela-Mandela, the former wife of Mandela. At the time of his death, he had been appointed to head the ANC electoral campaign in 2004, and his funeral was attended by former President Nelson Mandela, President Thabo Mbeki and Deputy President Jacob Zuma. Julius Malema has described Mokaba as a personal hero.

== Life ==
Peter Ramoshoane Mokaba was born on 7 January 1959, in Mankweng near Polokwane (then Pietersburg), where he did both his primary and secondary education. His mother is Priscilla Mokaba.

In 1982, he was convicted for a number of his underground activities as a member of paramilitary organization Umkhonto we Sizwe and was sentenced to prison on the Robben Island; yet, his sentence was suspended in 1984.

Subsequently, he renewed his anti-regime activities, especially among the youth. In 1987, he was elected as the first president of the South African Youth Congress (SAYCO). One year later, he was again charged with commanding Umkhonto we Sizwe in the northern Transvaal province but acquitted when his co-accused comrades refused to testify against him. When the liberation movement was unbanned in February 1990, Mokaba led the SAYCO movement, together with other youth formations (Congress of South African Students, South African National Students’ Congress, National Union of South African Students, Young Christian Students, etc.) to formal establishment of the African National Congress Youth League (ANCYL) and became the first president of this united organisation.

Mokaba was elected to the ANC National Executive Committee in 1991. After the end of apartheid era in 1994, he was appointed Deputy Minister of Tourism in the first democratically elected South African Parliament in the cabinet led by President Nelson Mandela. By the time of his death, Peter Mokaba had been appointed by the ANC to head the preparations for the 2004 national election campaign.

=== Apartheid spy accusation ===
In the book Askari, by Jacob Dlamini, it is alleged that Mokaba was an apartheid spy at one point. He was turned from insurgent to counter-insurgent by the apartheid government. Seeing that the Youth League, greatly influenced by Mokaba, would be greatly demoralised, the Lusaka ANC leadership decided to spare his life. According to the book, that was only after serious deals were reached with him that are known only to the current ANC leadership.

== Personal views ==
=== AIDS denialism ===
It is unclear if Mokaba himself had HIV, but nevertheless he was an AIDS denialist. He died in 2002 of pneumonia. He claimed that drugs had no benefits "beyond profits for the pharmaceutical industry". The fight against the companies, he said, should be waged with the same intensity as the struggle against apartheid. Privately, he assured supporters that HIV and AIDS were part of an "international Western plot" to decimate blacks and "regain colonial control" in Africa.

=== "Kill the farmer, kill the Boer" ===
Mokaba became known in the early 1990s for his use of the slogan "Kill the farmer, kill the Boer". The chant was ruled as hate speech by the South African Human Rights Commission in 2003. Opponents of the song argue that it bears a literal interpretation, inciting racial violence against whites; defenders claim that its value is purely as a reminder of South Africa's history and that it does not incite violence.
