= Brooklyn, Illinois =

Brooklyn
- Village
- Motto: Founded by Chance, Sustained by Courage
- Brooklyn in St. Clair County, Illinois
- Coordinates: 38°39′15″N 90°10′04″W
- Country: United States
- State: Illinois
- County: St. Clair
- Founded: July 8, 1873
- Founder: traditionally said to be Priscilla Baltimore

Area
  - Total: 0.81 sq mi (2.10 km^{2})
  - Land: 0.81 sq mi (2.10 km^{2})
  - Water: 0 sq mi (0.00 km^{2})
- Elevation: 410 ft (120 m)

Population (2020)
  - Total: 649
  - Density: 800.0/sq mi (308.89/km^{2})
- Time zone: UTC-6 (CST)
  - Summer (DST): UTC-5 (CDT)
- ZIP code: 62059
- Area code: 618
- FIPS code: 17-08667
- GNIS feature ID: 2397466
- Website: www.thevillageofbrooklyn.com

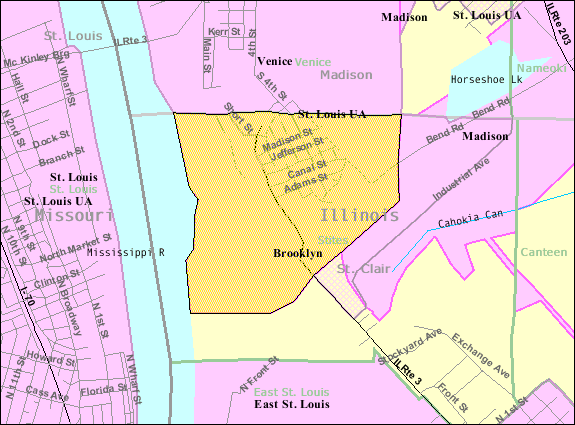
U.S. Census map

Brooklyn (popularly known as Lovejoy) is a village in St. Clair County, Illinois, United States. As of the 2020 census, Brooklyn had a population of 649. Located two miles north of East St. Louis, Illinois and three miles northeast of downtown St. Louis, Missouri, it is the oldest majority-Black incorporated town in the United States, founded by freed and fugitive slaves and incorporated in 1873. Its motto is "Founded by Chance, Sustained by Courage."

== History ==
A missionary AME Church was established in the new settlement in 1836. Now known as Quinn's Chapel AME, its congregation is believed to have supported the Underground Railroad and aided fugitive slaves to freedom, together with members of the Antioch Baptist Church established in 1838.

An early interracial community, it suffered from structural discrimination; transport lines were routed to bypass and isolate it rather than connecting it, and economic development projects passed over it, and indeed were set up in competition to it. In 2015, the county's state attorney Brendan Kelly described the village as a 'failed state.'

According to oral history tradition, by 1829 "Mother" Priscilla Baltimore led a group of eleven families, composed of both fugitive and free African Americans, to flee slavery in St. Louis, Missouri. They crossed the Mississippi River to the free state of Illinois, where they established a freedom village in the American Bottom. "Mother" Baltimore was said to have purchased her freedom as an adult from her master. She also bought the freedom of members of her family. Born in Kentucky, she tracked her white father to Missouri and bought her mother's freedom from him. The earliest black families included Anderson, Sullivan, Singleton, Wilson, Cox, Wyatt, and Carper.

Miranda Yancey-Bailey, an archaeologist working on a 21st-century project in Brooklyn, has found written evidence that Baltimore still lived in St. Louis in the 1830s; the first documentation of her associated with Brooklyn is from 1839. She may have been traveling between these locations for a time.

Baltimore had become a Methodist preacher and participated in the religious life of the new settlement. William Paul Quinn, then a missionary of the newly formed African Methodist Episcopal Church (AME), visited the settlement in 1836 and helped found the Brooklyn AME church that year. He had been assigned as a missionary that year to what was then called the Northwest, including Indiana and Ohio. Quinn was also active in planting new congregations in Kentucky and Missouri; he later became the fourth bishop of the AME Church. Brooklyn AME Church is thought to be the first AME Church west of the Appalachian Mountains. It is now known as Quinn's Chapel AME Church in his honor.

In 1837, five white abolitionists platted the land and created an unincorporated nearly all-black town. Thomas Osburn was one of them, and he is documented as having lived in the area for decades. Priscilla Baltimore built a house on his former land, which she occupied from 1851 to 1872. In the 1840s and 1850s, the African-American population of the village was about 200.

From the beginnings of Brooklyn, the ministers of the Quinn Chapel AME Church and Antioch Baptist Church (1838) used their churches as Underground Railroad stations to aid slaves escaping to freedom in Canada. William Paul Quinn and Priscilla Baltimore visited slaves in neighboring towns to inform them of the Underground Railroad's existence, and housed slaves in the churches before sending them to the next station. At one point, Quinn was captured by Missouri slave-catchers while on a missionary tour, but presented himself as a citizen of British India and was set free. Both of these church buildings have survived.

On July 8, 1873, Brooklyn was incorporated. By 1880, its population included 371 African-American and 203 European-American residents. In the late 19th century, its residents joined in taking new industrial jobs, commuting to those in East St. Louis and nearby areas. "Blacks who migrated to what became known as Brooklyn were attracted to the possibilities of working in an industrialized settlement that would enjoy race autonomy and self-determinism." In 1886, the African-American majority worked to register voters and gained political control of the village electing John Evans as the communitiy's first Black mayor. As with most political enterprises, factions developed within the community.

Regional capital investment largely bypassed Brooklyn, taking place in the competing East St. Louis, Illinois, which gained the all-important railroad connection. Other white-majority towns also benefited by being part of the network of investment. "[A]lmost none of the all-Black towns obtained a railroad." The small village soon became all black.

In 1891, then-Mayor Evans dedicated the town's new post office with the name Lovejoy (after the abolitionist Elijah P. Lovejoy, who had been assassinated in Alton, Illinois, in 1837). The later high school was also named after him. Around the turn of the 20th century, the high school had a high reputation in the area.

=== 20th century ===
Black autonomy did not automatically yield unity in the village. Tensions ran high with class and color conflicts by the early decades of the twentieth century, and evidence of political corruption. In addition, with the growth in number of young, single male workers, attracted to industrial jobs, the demographics changed and family life in the village declined. In 1915, two rival gangs attempting to declare themselves police chief had a shootout in front of a grocery store, resulting in three deaths. In 1933, the police chief ran an extortion ring and dissolved the city council at gunpoint, causing the county board of supervisors to replace the entire police force.

In 1940, it was reported that the town had fewer than ten white inhabitants, but the most prosperous businesses in the town were all white-owned. Furthermore, the local school had declined in quality. Black residents blamed a sense of fatalism.

Brooklyn was unaffected by the black nationalism movement in the 1960s, but in 1972, a small armed group called the United Front migrated from East St. Louis, professing a desire to create a sort of black nationalist intentional community. The mayor of the city, concerned that functions of city government might be usurped, deputized several men, who used the opportunity to gain social power in the city. Finally, in 1973, the mayor named a police chief in order to disarm the deputies, which resulted in one of them being shot dead after refusing to disarm. The chief was acquitted of murder in 1975.

With the decline of industry, from the mid-20th century on and the loss of jobs, Brooklyn has suffered high unemployment and problems similar to those of East St. Louis. It has struggled with persistent crime, and a limited economy and tax base. A cluster of bars and strip clubs provide a primary source of revenue in its limited economy. In June 2007, it was reported that three-quarters of Brooklyn's revenue of $380,000 comes through sales tax and a $30,000 licensing fee from the adult clubs.

=== Archeaological and historic research ===
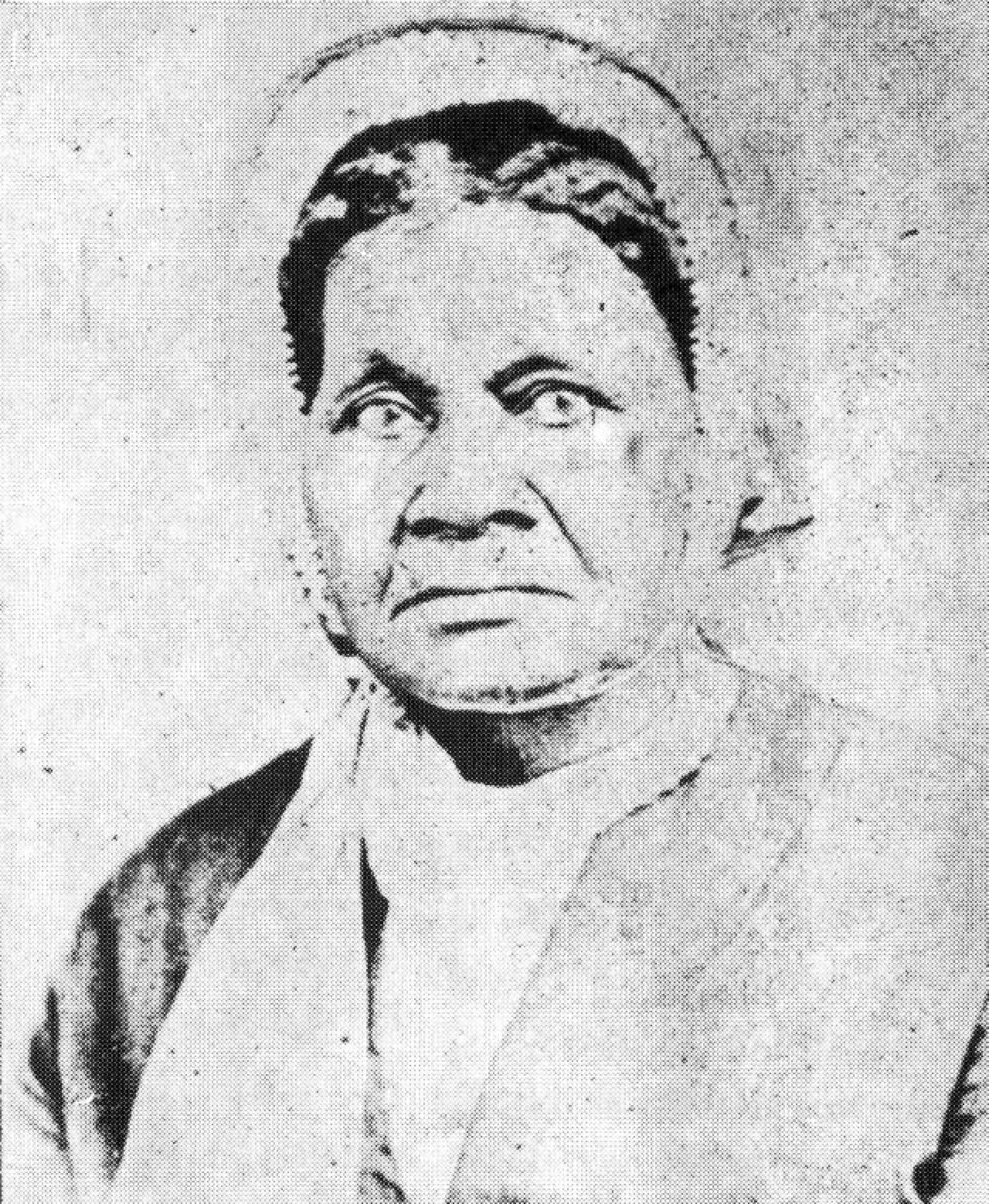
Priscilla "Mother" Baltimore

A state archaeological survey was required before construction of the Stan Musial Veterans Memorial Bridge between St. Louis and Illinois, which would require realignment of part of Rte. 3 near the village. In 2002, work revealed extensive prehistoric artifacts, so many that the researchers named the site "Janey B. Goode" after the popular Chuck Berry song, "Johnny B. Goode". This site lies within Brooklyn's incorporated limits but just east of the historical residential part of town. It lies along the southern margin of the Horseshoe Lake meander just north of the East St. Louis Mound Group of earthworks. By the end of the 2007 field season, the team had excavated 7,000 prehistoric features, making this one of the largest sites ever excavated in the USA. Most of these features are associated with the Late Woodland Patrick phase and early Terminal Late Woodland Lloyd phase, approximately from 600 AD to 1200 AD. They suggest a more complex and dense indigenous community than researchers had known lived in the area.

In association with its work, the Illinois State Archaeological Survey (ISAS) (formerly ITARP), a joint project of the state and the University of Illinois, conducted outreach with the village of Brooklyn, volunteering to survey some of the areas associated with its early 19th-century history. A team of archaeologists led by Dr. Joseph Galloy found evidence of early Afro-American occupation from 1830 to 1850, as well as material in other areas from 1850 to 1870. This discovery suggests that the remains of Mother Baltimore's Freedom Village survive beneath the surface in Upper Brooklyn. It also means that artifacts and other evidence of the town's founding may be revealed if additional excavations are conducted there in the future. This would enhance the town's historical significance and research potential.

Since the turn of the 21st century, residents have rallied around new work related to documentation of the village's rich historical past. They have worked to collect oral histories and personal accounts of the village. In 2007, residents founded the Historical Society Of Brooklyn, Illinois. The historical society, together with the ISAS' Drs. Joseph Galloy, Thomas Emerson and Miranda Yancey; Dr. Chris Fennell of the University of Illinois, and the Illinois State Museum, is working to preserve the history of Brooklyn.

ISAS also helped the historical society to review documents to locate "Mother" Priscilla Baltimore's unmarked grave at Bellefontaine Cemetery in St. Louis. In September 2010, the Brooklyn Historical Society installed a gravestone in her honor at the cemetery. In addition, ISAS will assist the village in surveying the Brooklyn cemetery to detect gravesites and try to document the history.

Surveys in 2008 revealed that "the archaeological record of Brooklyn lies intact beneath the extensive open spaces of current-day residential parcels." In the summer of 2009, an archaeological field study began to excavate Mother Priscilla Baltimore's freedom village. The results of this collaborative project are expected to yield material that will aid the town in gaining designation for an historic district to be listed on the National Register of Historic Places. In 2023, Landmarks Illinois added Brooklyn to 2023's list of Most Endangered Historic Places in Illinois, listing among its threats Brooklyn's decline in population and economy, high unemployment and low tax base, its lack of recognition for its history, and its sale of parcels to railroads that separate the community from the riverbank.

The Historical Society of Brooklyn and its collaborators are seeking national designation for three particularly significant sites: the late prehistoric Janey B. Goode archaeological site, identified as 11S1232; Brooklyn's historic cemetery, identified as 11S1233; and Quinn Chapel A.M.E. Church. Built in 1836, Quinn Chapel African Methodist Episcopal Church was the first of that newly formed, independent black denomination to be built west of the Appalachian Mountains, as well as the first in Illinois. The AME Church was founded as a denomination by free blacks in Philadelphia and its region in 1816.

== Geography ==
According to the 2010 census, Brooklyn has a total area of 0.83 square miles (2.15 km^{2}), all land.

== Demographics ==
Historical population
Census	Pop.	Note	%±
1900	1,019		—
1910	1,569		54.0%
1920	1,685		7.4%
1930	2,063		22.4%
1940	2,158		4.6%
1950	2,568		19.0%
1960	1,922		−25.2%
1970	1,702		−11.4%
1980	1,233		−27.6%
1990	1,144		−7.2%
2000	676		−40.9%
2010	749		10.8%
2020	649		−13.4%
U.S. Decennial Census

Brooklyn, Illinois – Racial and ethnic composition Note: the US Census treats Hispanic/Latino as an ethnic category. This table excludes Latinos from the racial categories and assigns them to a separate category. Hispanics/Latinos may be of any race.
Race / Ethnicity (NH = Non-Hispanic)	Pop 2000	Pop 2010	Pop 2020	% 2000	% 2010	% 2020
White alone (NH)	4	17	15	0.59%	2.27%	2.31%
Black or African American alone (NH)	664	703	604	98.22%	93.86%	93.07%
Native American or Alaska Native alone (NH)	1	0	2	0.15%	0.00%	0.31%
Asian alone (NH)	0	0	0	0.00%	0.00%	0.00%
Native Hawaiian or Pacific Islander	0	0	0	0.00%	0.00%	0.00%
Other race alone (NH)	0	2	1	0.00%	0.27%	0.15%
Mixed race or Multiracial (NH)	4	15	16	0.59%	2.00%	2.47%
Hispanic or Latino (any race)	3	12	11	0.44%	1.60%	1.69%
Total	676	749	649	100.00%	100.00%	100.00%

As of the census of 2000, there were 676 people, 267 households, and 166 families residing in the village. The population density was 801.9 inhabitants per square mile (309.6/km^{2}). There were 346 housing units at an average density of 410.5 per square mile (158.5/km^{2}). The racial makeup of the village was 0.59% White, 98.67% African American, 0.15% Native American, and 0.59% from two or more races. Hispanic or Latino of any race were 0.44% of the population.

There were 267 households, out of which 27.0% had children under the age of 18 living with them, 16.9% were married couples living together, 39.7% had a female householder with no husband present, and 37.8% were non-families. 36.0% of all households were made up of individuals, and 25.8% had someone living alone who was 65 years of age or older. The average household size was 2.53 and the average family size was 3.34.

In the village, the population was spread out, with 30.3% under the age of 18, 9.8% from 18 to 24, 21.9% from 25 to 44, 19.2% from 45 to 64, and 18.8% who were 65 years of age or older. The median age was 33 years. For every 100 females, there were 68.6 males. For every 100 females age 18 and over, there were 60.8 males.

The median income for a household in the village was $16,630, and the median income for a family was $30,994. Males had a median income of $24,375 versus $21,108 for females. The per capita income for the village was $7,944. About 28.2% of families and 48.5% of the population were below the poverty line, including 33.5% of those under age 18 and 74.0% of those age 65 or over.

== Government ==
Brooklyn has an elected city council and mayor.

The town has a police department that in 2015 was described by the county prosecutor as having “gone from dysfunctional to nonfunctional.”

== Education ==
Brooklyn Unit School District 188 operates public schools.

== Notable people ==
- Hamiet Bluiett, saxophonist (1940–2018)
- Prince Joe Henry, Negro league baseball player
- Albert King, blues guitarist (1923–1992)

== Bibliography ==
- Cha-Jua, Sundiata Keita (2000). America's First Black Town: Brooklyn, Illinois, 1830-1915, Urbana, IL: University of Illinois Press, 2002.
- "Examining Structural Racism in the Jim Crow Era of Illinois," in The Materiality of Freedom: Archaeologies of Post-Emancipation Life, edited by Jodi Barnes, pp. 173–189, University of South Carolina Press (2011).
- Norman Dwight Harris, The History of Negro Servitude In Illinois, and of the Slavery Agitation in That State, 1719-1864 (Chicago: A.C. McClurg, 1904)
- Glennette Tilley Turner, The Underground Railroad in Illinois (Glen Ellyn, Illinois: Newman Educational Publishing, 2001)
