= Brooklyn Unit School District 188 =

School district in St. Clair County, Illinois, United States

Address
- PO Box 250 Lovejoy, Illinois, 62059; United States

District information
- Type: Public
- Grades: PreK–12
- NCES District ID: 1723640

Students and staff
- Students: 152

Other information
- Website: www.lovejoyschool.org

Brooklyn Unit School District is a school district serving Brooklyn, Illinois in Greater St. Louis, United States.

As of 2012, the district has about 240 students. The district consists of two school buildings: the main Lovejoy School building, which houses the district administrative offices and facilities for grades 3 through 12, and the Amelia Cole Liddell Annex building, which houses Head Start/Pre-Kindergarten programs, Kindergarten, and Grades 1 and 2. The students are organized into three schools: Lovejoy Elementary in grades Kindergarten through 5, Lovejoy Middle School in grades 6 through 8, and Lovejoy Academy in grades 9 through 12.
