= Prisca =

Prisca is a feminine given name related to Priscilla. It is borne by:

- Prisca (empress) (died 315), Roman empress, wife of Emperor Diocletian
- Prisca (prophet) (late 2nd century), founding leader and prophet of Montanism
- Saint Prisca, Roman Catholic martyr and saint
- Prisca Awiti Alcaraz (born 1996), English-born judoka competing for Mexico
- Prisca Bustamante (born 1964), Peruvian-Ecuadorian actress
- Prisca Chesang (born 2003), Ugandan middle- and long-distance runner
- Prisca Chilufya] (born 1999), Zambian footballer
- Prisca Emeafu (born 1972), Nigerian former footballer
- Prisca Liberali, 21st century Italian chemist
- Prisca or Priscah Mupfumira, 21st century Zimbabwean politician and former government minister
- Prisca Matimba Nyambe (born 1951), Zambian judge
- Prisca Steinegger (born 1977), Swiss footballer
- Prisca Thévenot (born 1985), French politician

== See also ==
- Priscah Jepleting Cherono (born 1980), Kenyan 5000 m and cross-country runner
- Santa Prisca (DC Comics), fictional location
