= American Bottom =

Flood plain of the Mississippi River in Illinois

Coordinates: 38°24′N 90°18′W

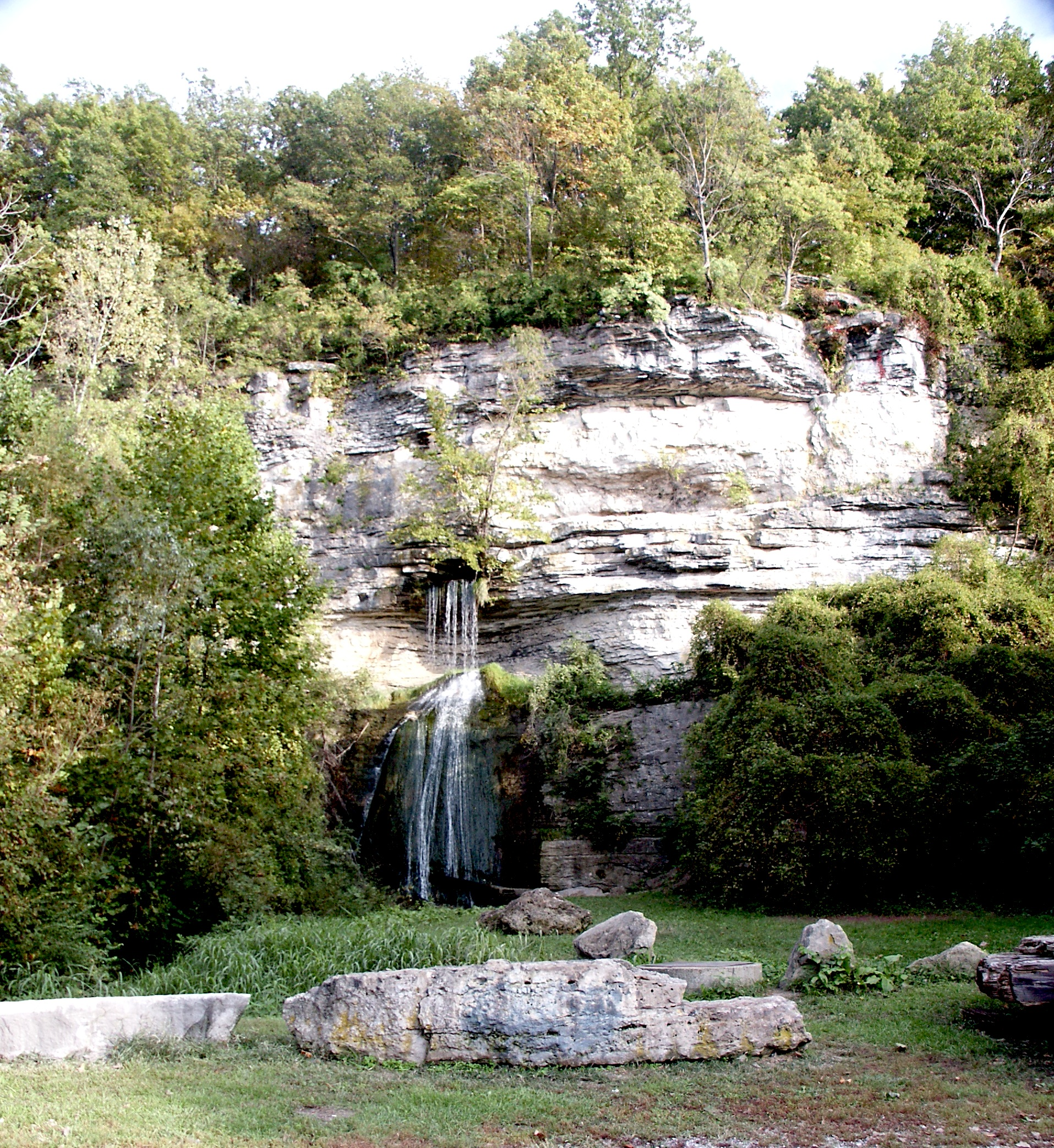
The American Bottom region is bordered by tall bluffs such as this one, rising near Dupo, Illinois. This waterfall is called Falling Springs.

The American Bottom is the flood plain of the Mississippi River in the Metro East region of Southern Illinois, extending from Alton, Illinois, south to the Kaskaskia River. It is also sometimes called the "American Bottoms". The area is about 175 square miles (450 km^{2}), mostly protected from flooding in the 21st century by a levee and drainage canal system. Immediately across the river from St. Louis, Missouri, are industrial and urban areas, but nearby marshland, swamps, and the Horseshoe Lake (which was created by the river) are reminders of the Bottoms' riparian nature.

This plain with its rich alluvial soil, served as the center for the pre-Columbian Cahokia Mounds civilization, and later the French settlement of Illinois Country. Deforestation of the river banks in the 19th century to fuel steamboats had dramatic environmental effects in this region. The Mississippi River between St. Louis and the confluence with the Ohio River became wider and more shallow, as unstable banks collapsed into the water. This resulted in more severe flooding and lateral changes of the major channel, causing the destruction of several French colonial towns, such as Kaskaskia, which relocated; Cahokia, and St. Philippe, Illinois.

The southern portion of the American Bottoms is primarily agricultural, planted chiefly in corn, wheat, and soybean. The American Bottom is part of the Mississippi Flyway used by migrating birds and has the greatest concentration of bird species in Illinois. The flood plain is bounded on the east by a nearly continuous, 200- to 300-foot high, 80-mile (130 km) long bluff of limestone and dolomite, above which begins the great prairie that covers most of the state. The Mississippi River bounds the Bottom on its west, and the river abuts the bluffline on the Missouri side. Portions of St. Clair, Madison, Monroe, and Randolph counties are in the American Bottom. Its maximum width is about 9 miles (14 km) in the north, and it is about 2 to 3 miles in width throughout most of its southern extent.

== History ==
=== Indigenous people ===
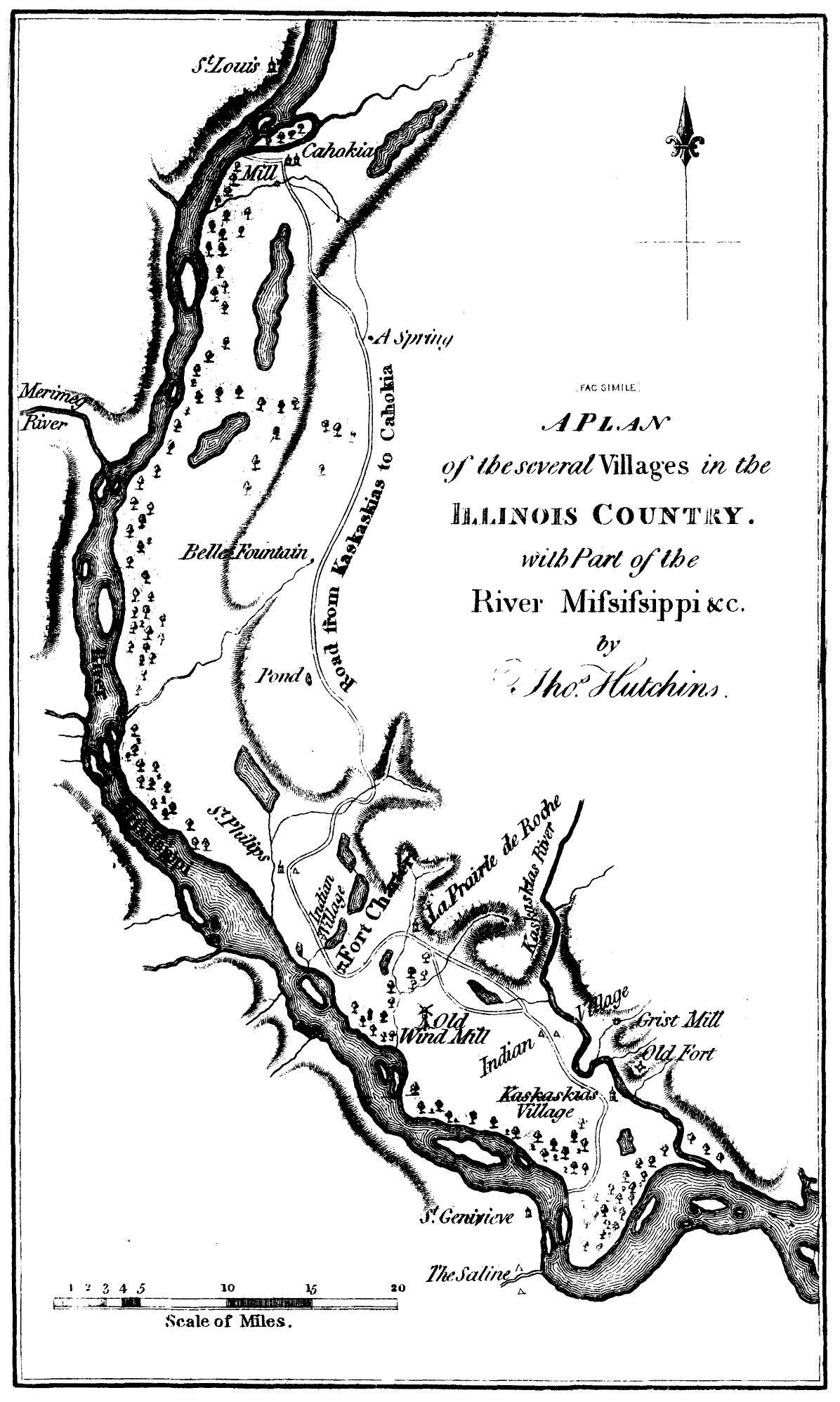
Map of the villages of the American Bottom as they appeared in the late 18th century

Before European settlement, the area was home to indigenous peoples for many centuries. The peak civilization was created by peoples of the Mississippian culture, known as the Mound Builders. With the cultivation of maize, they were able to create food surpluses and build concentrated settlements in the centuries after 600 CE. The Cahokia Mounds Site, which was built as the center attracted a rapid increase in population after 1000 CE, is a six-square mile complex of large, man-made, earthen mounds rising from the flood plain. In 1982, it was designated by UNESCO as one of only eight World Heritage Sites in the United States.

The most prominent structure is Monks Mound, rising 10 stories high at the center of the complex and fronting on a 40-acre (160,000 m^{2}) Grand Plaza. Monks Mound is the largest Pre-Columbian earthwork in the Americas, and the complex is the largest earthwork north of Mexico. The engineering of the mounds showed that their builders had an expert knowledge of the varying soils and their capacities. Cahokia was a complex, planned, and designed urban center with a residential population, farming, and artisan production of refined crafts and goods. With its location at the confluence of three major rivers, it was the center of a regional trading network reaching to the Great Lakes and the Gulf Coast. With a population estimated at 30,000 at its peak, Cahokia was the largest city north of modern-day Mexico. Perhaps for ecological reasons—deforestation and overhunting—the city went into decline after 1300 and was abandoned before 1400. No city in the territorial United States surpassed this population until 1790, when New York City exceeded it.

Archaeological investigation has determined that the various types of mounds were arranged in a planned construction that reflected the cosmology of the Mississippians. The smaller ridge-top and conical mounds were used for ritual burials, some for elites and some for apparent sacrifices. The larger platform mounds were used for temples and homes of the elite. Archaeologists have found remains of a 2-mile (3.2 km) long, defensive wooden stockade that enclosed the central precinct and was rebuilt several times. They also discovered two major solar calendars, now known as Woodhenge, as the works were constructed of cedar, which was considered a sacred wood. The area surrounding the mounds had numerous borrow pits from which soil was taken to build the mounds and to fill and level the Grand Plaza and other plazas.

=== French settlement ===
After Cahokia was abandoned, there were few indigenous inhabitants in the area in the 17th century at the time of first French exploration. The French made the earliest European settlement in this region of the Mississippi River Valley. They encountered Illiniwek clans called Cahokia, after whom they named the earthwork complex, and Kaskaskia, after whom the French named a river, a town and a fort. The French villages included Kaskaskia, Cahokia, Prairie du Rocher, St. Philippe, and Prairie du Pont, all under the protection of Fort de Chartres and Fort Kaskaskia. Examples of 18th-century French Colonial architecture survive here, including the old Cahokia courthouse and Holy Family Catholic Church, both made with the distinctive vertical-log construction known as poteaux-sur-solle.

=== Americans ===
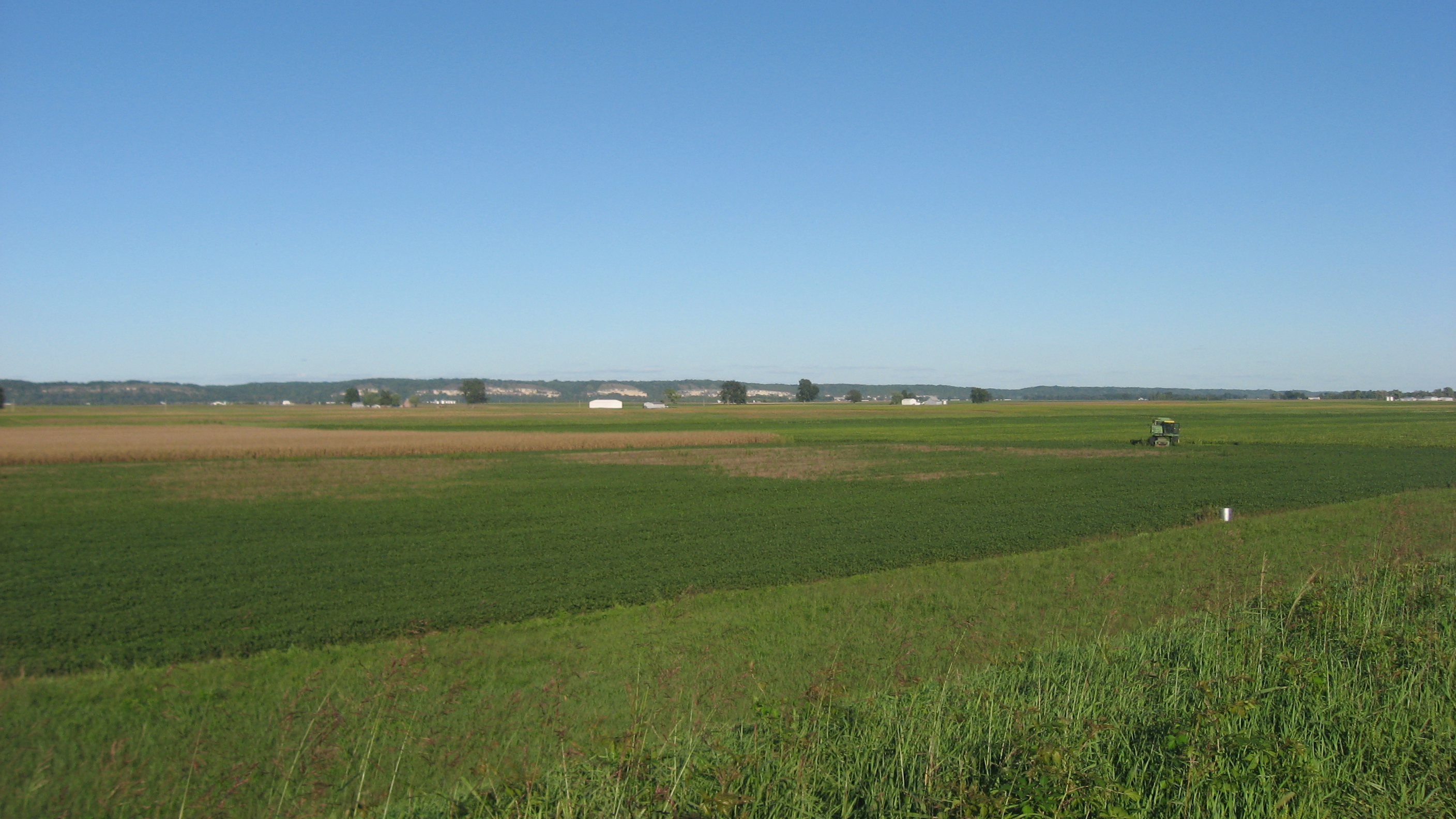
Fields in the Bottom in far southern Monroe County

American settlers began arriving near the end of the American Revolution after the Illinois Country was ceded by Great Britain to the new United States. In the early years, American single men came to the country, and there was little government and much anarchy. As Americans arrived, many residents of French descent moved west of the Mississippi River to St. Louis and Ste. Genevieve, Missouri. Within several years, the former French colonial towns had become mostly American in population, and English dominated as the language.

The Goshen Settlement was an early American settlement at the edge of the Bottom. The settlers continued to use the rich alluvial floodplain mostly for agriculture until the late 19th century. Brooklyn, Illinois was founded by 1839 as a freedom village by free people of color and fugitive slaves, led by "Mother" Priscilla Baltimore. It was the first town incorporated by African Americans under a state legal system.

The rivers were used as transportation routes for trading and travel. The introduction of steamboats to the Mississippi and other major rivers led to deforestation of the river banks in the 19th century. The steamboats consumed much wood for fuel, leading to dramatic environmental effects along the Mississippi River between St. Louis and the confluence with the Ohio River. With so many trees taken down, the banks became unstable, collapsing into the river due to the powerful current. In this area, the Mississippi became wider and more shallow, which resulted in more severe flooding and lateral changes of the major channel. Several French colonial towns in the 19th century, such as Kaskaskia, Cahokia, and St. Philippe, Illinois, were flooded and destroyed. Kaskaskia was rebuilt but, after the channel of the Mississippi shifted, it was cut off from the mainland of Illinois and is connected to Missouri land.

The area of the Bottom directly across from St. Louis became highly industrialized. Industrialists located many "smokestack" industries here, such as steel mills, chemical plants, and oil refineries, because they ran on Illinois coal. In addition, the people who built the first bridge from St. Louis across the Mississippi River to Illinois imposed a tax on heavy traffic. Rather than pay it, developers simply located their industries in East St. Louis.

In the early 20th century, dramatic growth in industrial jobs in the American Bottom attracted many European immigrants and African-American migrants. The latter left the rural South in the Great Migration to work in factories and gain better lives for their children. Eastern European immigrants founded the first Bulgarian Orthodox Church in the United States in Madison, Illinois. Today, East St. Louis is predominantly African-American in ethnicity. Following industrial restructuring, other immigrant descendants moved to other areas when following jobs and housing. Heavy industry is still prominent in the area, although total employment in these industries continues to decline after restructuring and industry changes.

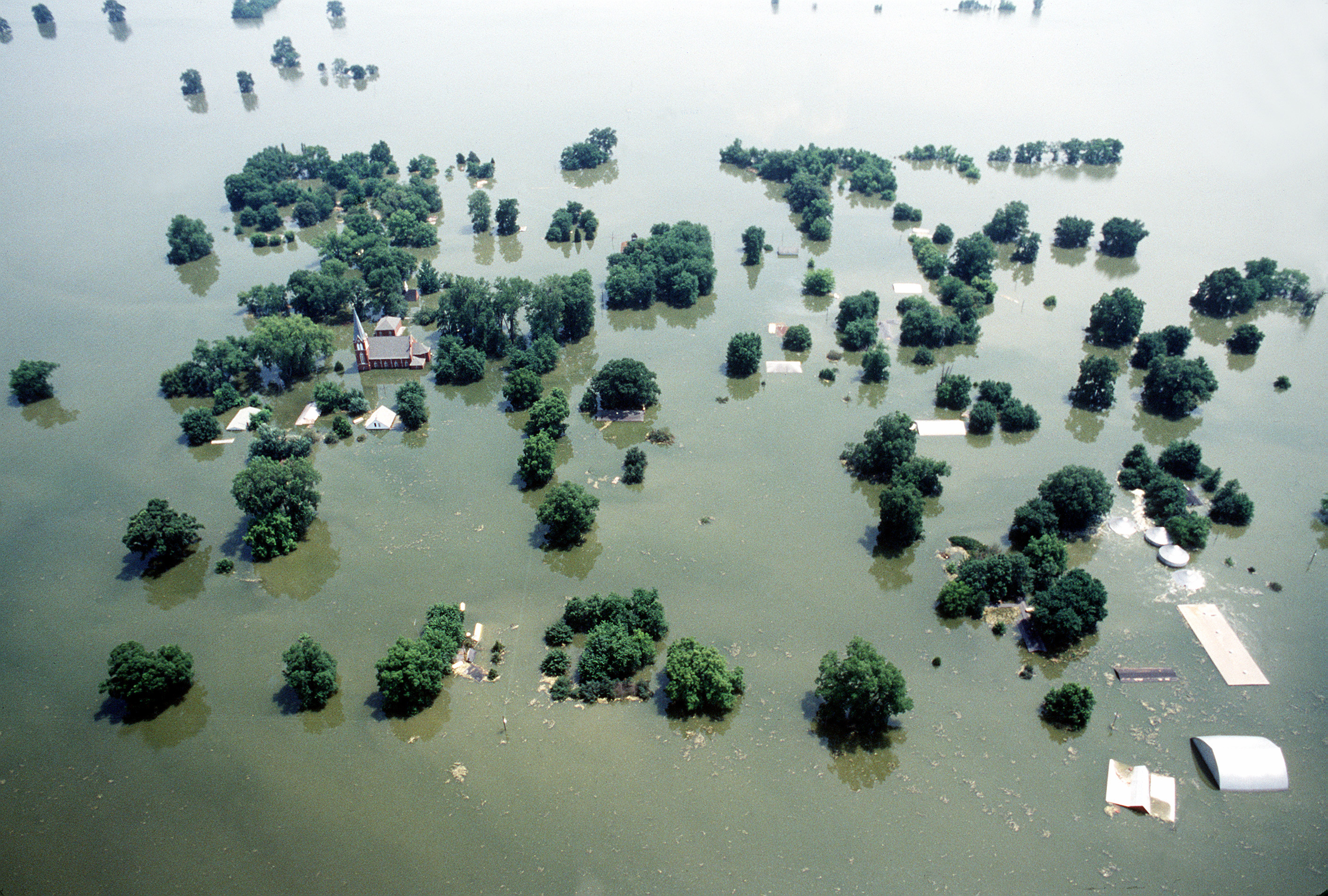
1993 flooding of Kaskaskia, looking south.

Like the Mississippians, Americans made massive changes in the floodplain; their development has reduced its ability to absorb floods. The destruction of wetlands and paving over of areas along all the major rivers has increased the severity of flooding over the decades, despite attempted engineering solutions for flood control, which in turn have exacerbated flooding. During the Great Flood of 1993, major portions of the southern Bottom were flooded; 47,000 acres (190 km^{2}) of land below Columbia, Illinois was inundated, destroying the town of Valmeyer. The waters came within five feet of overtopping the East St. Louis levee. If they had run over, they would have flooded 71,000 acres (290 km^{2}) and destroyed this urban industrial area. More than nine feet of floodwater covered the town of Kaskaskia in 1993 after it overtopped the levee; only the spire of the Catholic church and roof of a nearby shrine rose far above the waters.

== Major cities in American Bottom ==
- Alton
- East St. Louis
- Granite City
- Madison
- Cahokia

== See also ==
- Brooklyn, Illinois, first town in the US to be incorporated by African Americans
- Southern Illinois, a major geographical region of Illinois
- Metro-East, the urban area east of St. Louis, Missouri
- Illinois Caverns State Natural Area, part of a major Karst region draining into the Bottom.
- Fort de Chartres, early French colonial fort
