= Revista do Instituto Histórico e Geográfico Brasileiro =

Magazine of the Brazilian Historic and Geographic Institute

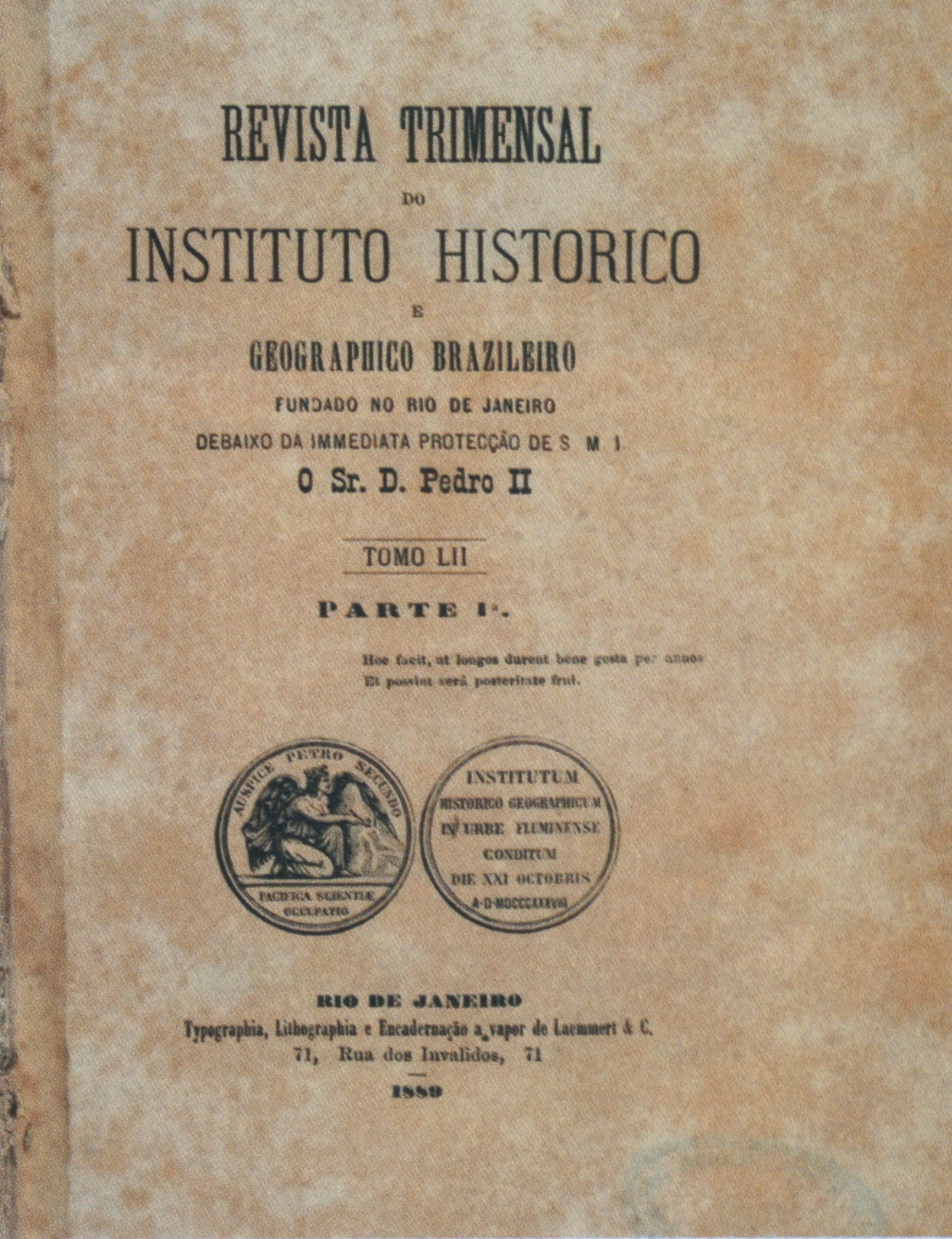
- Tome 52 (part 1) of the magazine, published in 1889
- Frequency: Quarterly (every 3 months)
- Founded: 1838; 188 years ago
- First issue: 1839; 187 years ago
- Company: Brazilian Historic and Geographic Institute
- Country: Brazil
- Based in: Rio de Janeiro
- Language: Brazilian Portuguese
- Website: www.ihgb.org.br/publicacoes/revista-ihgb
- ISSN: 0101-4366
- OCLC: 985580660

The Revista do Instituto Histórico e Geográfico Brasileiro is the magazine of the Brazilian Historic and Geographic Institute.

Founded in 1839, the magazine is a quarterly that tries to uphold the institutions ideals of objective research. The publication is part of the Institutes h role in preserving the country's cultural memory. Disseminating the studies and works of its members and similar entities from the rest of the world, the Brazilian Historical and Geographic Institute also allows research in its vast collection.

== Editorial line ==
The IHGB's official website features the following statement on the journal's editorial policy:

Circulating regularly since 1839, the Revista do Instituto Histórico e Geográfico Brasileiro is one of the longest-running specialized publications in the Western world. It aims to disseminate the production of the Institute's social body, as well as contributions from historians, geographers, anthropologists, sociologists, architects, ethnologists, archaeologists, museologists and archivists in general. It is published quarterly, the last number of each year being reserved for recording the academic life of the IHGB and other institutional activities.
