= Priscila Rezende =

Brazilian performance artist (born 1985)

Priscila Rezende (born 1985) is a Brazilian performance artist who lives and works in Belo Horizonte, Brazil. She received a degree in Visual Arts from Guignard-UEMG School in Belo Horizonte, specializing in Photography and Ceramics. Her work departs from her experiences as a Black woman to examine and challenge discourses of racism in Brazil. She explores the legacy of Transatlantic African slavery and plantation economies, as well as anti-black racism in beauty standards. She has shown work at the Museu de Arte da Pampulha (2013), Rabieh Gallery in São Paulo (2014), SAVVY Contemporary in Berlin (2016), Sesc Palladium in Belo Horizonte (2017), and at the Performe-se Festival in Vitoria. In 2018, she was an artist in Residence at CMC/SESC at Central Saint Martins in London and at Art Omi in Ghent, New York. Though she primarily works through performance, she has also produced "Bargain" (2017), a video work.

Her performance works include:

- Bombril (2010)
- Body (2011)
- Ties (2013)
- Purification I (2013)
- Purification II (2014)
- Purification III (2014)
- Deformation (2015)
- Genesis 9:25 (2015)
- Re-education (2016)
- Genesis 3:16 (2017)
- Come...to be unhappy (2017)
- Black Indices Exhibition (2017)
- November 29, 1781 (2018)
- £20m (2018)
