= Joe Henry (baseball) =

American baseball player

- Second base / Third base
- Born: October 4, 1930; Brooklyn, Illinois
- Died: January 2, 2009 (aged 78); Brooklyn, Illinois
- Batted: Left Threw: Right

Negro leagues debut
- 1950, for the Memphis Red Sox

Last Negro leagues appearance
- 1959, for the Detroit Stars

Teams
- Memphis Red Sox (1950–1952); Indianapolis Clowns (1955–1957); Detroit Stars (1957–1959)

"Prince" Joe Henry (October 4, 1930 – January 2, 2009) was an American baseball player. He played for several Negro league teams in the 1950s.

== Life and sports ==
Henry was born and raised in Brooklyn, Illinois, where he played softball as a youngster. He was discovered by catcher Josh Johnson, who encouraged him to try baseball. Goose Curry scouted him to play in the Negro leagues, starting him off in a Mississippi baseball school. He played for three years with the Memphis Red Sox, then signed a minor league contract, playing in 1952 in the Mississippi–Ohio Valley League for Canton and in 1953 for Mount Vernon. During these years he sustained injuries that prevented him from playing further in the minors. He returned to the Negro leagues in 1955–56 with the Indianapolis Clowns, but did not play for most of 1957 until he was convinced to return and play with the Detroit Stars. In 1958 he was selected as an All-Star for the East-West All Star Game. His last year in the Negro leagues was 1959.

Late in his life, Henry fought a long battle with Major League Baseball to secure pension benefits that the league promised Negro league players in the 1990s. In the 2000s, Henry began authoring a newspaper column for the St. Louis, Missouri, Riverfront Times (with the help of his grandson, Sean R. Muhammad) called "Ask a Negro Leaguer". He died January 2, 2009, after a sustained illness.
