= Priscilla Wadsworth =

American pencil artist

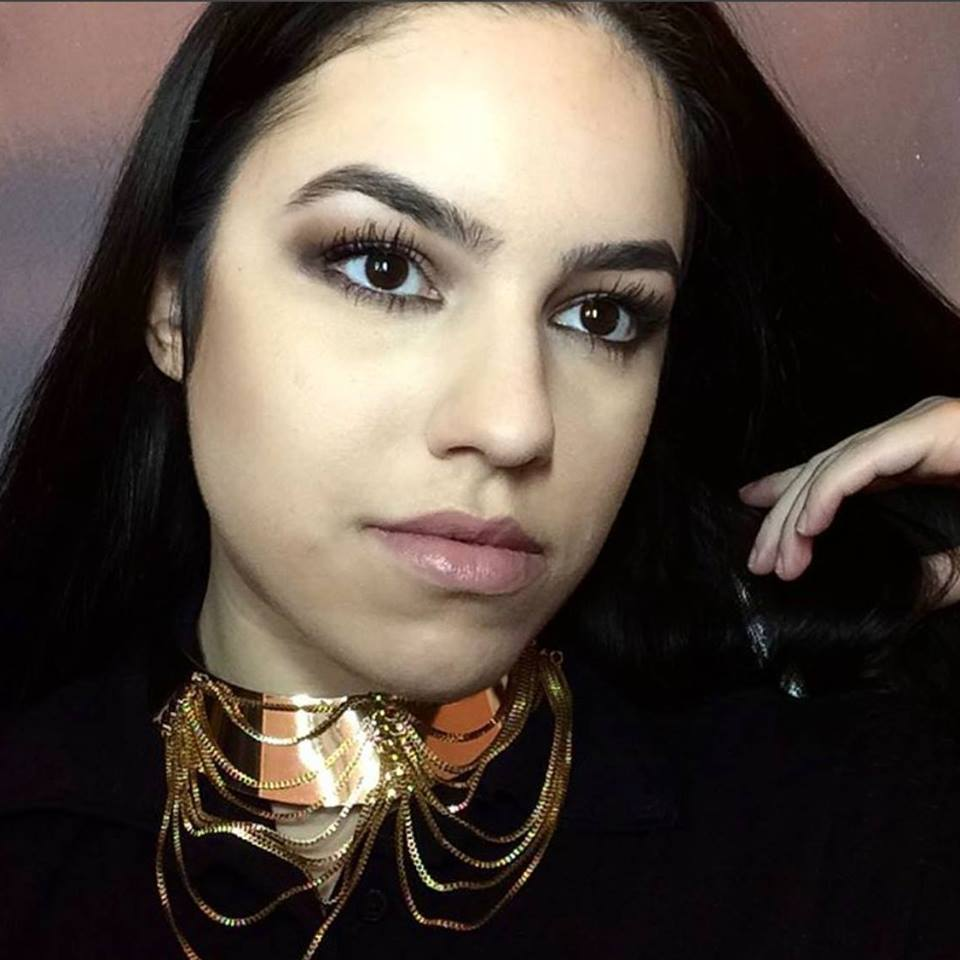
Priscilla Wadsworth

Priscilla Wadsworth (born 1990) is a pencil artist who specializes in sports art, particularly related to Alabama Crimson Tide football. Her portrait of Mal Moore was displayed in the Paul Bryant Museum.

== Career ==
Wadsworth began doing pencil drawings at age 16. She continued to draw while at the University of Alabama, studying music performance, until she decided to focus on art in the summer of 2012.

In addition to the portrait of Moore that is in the Paul Bryant Museum, Nick Saban requested a copy of her print of him holding the college football championship trophy, and her work has been purchased by popular Alabama football players such as Eddie Lacy, A. J. McCarron, and C.J. Mosley.

Aside from sports art, Priscilla's other artistic ventures include diorama making, figure sculpting, and digital drawings. She was also licensed by Against Gravity, the creators of the virtual reality game Rec Room, to sell her Rec Room inspired artwork.

== Personal life ==
In 2017, Wadsworth married Mark Gebbia; their legal marriage was followed up by a ceremony in Rec Room. Wired featured their online wedding in a 2018 story.
