= Priscilla Mokaba =

South African political activist

- Born: 1937; South Africa
- Died: 22 December 2013 (aged 76); South Africa
- Citizenship: South African
- Occupations: Political activist; Community worker
- Organization: African National Congress
- Known for: Anti-apartheid activism
- Children: Peter Mokaba

Priscilla Mokaba was a South African political activist. She was the mother of Peter Mokaba, a former deputy minister and member of parliament in South Africa. Priscilla was one of several political activists put in jail in South Africa during the 1980s. She was described as "a distinguished activist who had stood firm against the apartheid regime" by the African National Congress.

== Community work ==
Priscilla continued her services to her community until her death. It is reported that she was working with female soccer teams in her home country. She also taught beadwork and ran a "vegetable project." Mokaba died at the age of 76 on 22 December 2013.

== Legacy ==
She died on 22 December 2013 at the age of 76. The President Jacob Zuma offered a state funeral in her honor.
