= Priscilla Freeman Jacobs =

Waccamaw-Siouan chief

- Born: October 27, 1940 (age 85); Ricefield, North Carolina
- Education: Miller Mott Business College
- Occupation: Chief of the Waccamaw-Siouan
- Predecessor: Clifton Jacobs
- Spouse: Welton Jacobs
- Parent(s): Clifton Freeman and Vara Patrick

Priscilla Freeman Jacobs is a former Native American chief of the Waccamaw-Siouan tribe from 1986 to early 2005. Throughout her life she advocated for her tribe, helping to improve educational opportunity and economic development as well as promoting a resurgence of appropriation for Indian culture and heritage.

== Childhood and early life ==
Priscilla Freeman Jacobs was born in 1940 to Clifton Freeman and Vara Patrick and was the first born of her 3 other siblings. They grew up in the Ricefield area of the Waccamaw-Siouan community, about 37 miles from Wilmington, North Carolina where her family made a living through logging and forestry.

At 9 years old Jacobs traveled to Washington, DC with a delegation of the Waccamaw-Siouan community to ask federal recognition from the US Congress to stand as an Indian Tribe. However, the bill did not pass. After her father, Clifton Freeman, became chief in 1941, she accompanied him to many country wide meetings, learning about the challenges her people faced and watching as he worked to secure jobs, and improve infrastructure for the Waccamaw-Siouan.

She was educated in the American Indian schools, a local school, (open from the 1920s-1960s) which primarily taught literacy, mathematics, history and respect for her heritage and then studied secretarial work at the Miller Mott Businesses College of Wilmington. After graduating, she returned home to work for her fathers logging business and in 1961, she married Welton Jacobs who was also Waccamaw-Siouan. They had two children: Ray Freeman and Welton Jacobs.

== Career ==
Throughout the 1960s Jacobs and her father worked to re-introduce the pan-Indian powwow as a way to bring solidarity and recognition to the Tribes. Finally in 1970 Jacobs, led the group who organized the first modern Waccamaw-Siouan powwow. This was a big step in regaining the identity of the Waccamaw-Siouan after the Indian schools had been closed. In Jacobs' own words:

"[The purpose was]... to revive our Indian culture. This was a way of doing it - of letting people see... It was our intention to bring [Indian] people together for fellowship, to see what each other was doing, to share our arts and crafts with one another, [to share] the progress."

After the loss of the Indian schools this was seen as the greatest thing to unify around. The Waccamw Sioux have organized their powwow annually each October since 1970.

In 1974 Jacobs acquired five acres of land from the International Paper Company to use as the Waccamaw center of tribal life. Today that area has grown to thirty acres and includes a daycare, office, and ball field. This ownership of the Waccamaw culture was a part of the larger national cultural renaissance in the 1960s and 1970s which was characterized by the growing participation in powwows and the emergence of a national generalized Indian Identity.

Jacobs succeeded her father as chief of the Waccamaw-Siouan when she was 45, after his death in November 1985. Although her brothers were next in line for the chieftainship, they declined, choosing instead to focus on running the family's logging business. Her inauguration as chief was held at Frontier Fort near Wilmington in 1986 making her the first female chief of the Waccamaw Sioux and one of very few in the country. Her tribal board was made up mostly of family.

Jacobs adamant activism is partially responsible for the formation of the N.C. Commission of Indian Affairs and she acted as the first secretary of the commissions board of directors and later on she became community developer. Between 1971 and 1973, she represented the Waccamaw Sioux at the Coalition for Eastern Native Americans alongside her father. She was a participant in the N.C. Indian Unity Conference and was part of the collaborative force that formed the Waccamaw-Siouan Development Association (WSDA) whose goal is to develop programs for and improve education, economic development, and culture.

Jacobs was a social and political figurehead for her tribe as well as a spiritual leader. She was given a religious upbringing under Christianity and continued to practice into adulthood. She was a minister, bookkeeper and secretary before becoming chief. Her faith is deeply interwoven with her pride in her Indian heritage.

She ceased to be chief in 2005.
