= Priscilla Settee =

Cree activist

Priscilla Settee is a Cree activist for Native rights, women's rights and environmental rights living in Canada. She is the director of the Indigenous People's program at the University of Saskatchewan.

== Biography ==
Settee is from north Saskatchewan. She attended Trent University and then became a teacher in Saskatchewan. She works with Aboriginal gang members and she is a professor at the University of Saskatchewan. Her specialty in Native studies is researching Aboriginal ways of understanding the world in the fields of sciences and engineering. As a professor, she stresses real-world learning, assigning community service to her students. Settee was on the board of the Oskayak High School, the only Aboriginal high school in Saskatoon. from 1996 to 2013.

As an activist, she has worked to set up a shelter for women facing domestic violence in Prince Albert. In 1996, she was the only Canadian woman on the board of the Indigenous Women's Network (IWN). In 2013, she was awarded the Queen Elizabeth II Diamond Jubilee Medal for her work and contributions to Canada.

In 2011, she published The Strength of Women: Âhkamêyimowak. The book's collection of stories were called by Windspeaker to be "both inspiring and thought-provoking" on the topic of women in Native communities. The word Âhkamêyimowak, roughly means "persistence" and the "strength for women to carry on in the face of extreme adversity," writes Settee. She has also published Pimatisiwin: Global Indigenous Knowledge Systems (2013).
