= Priscilla Dorsey Ridgely =

First Lady of Maryland (1762–1814)

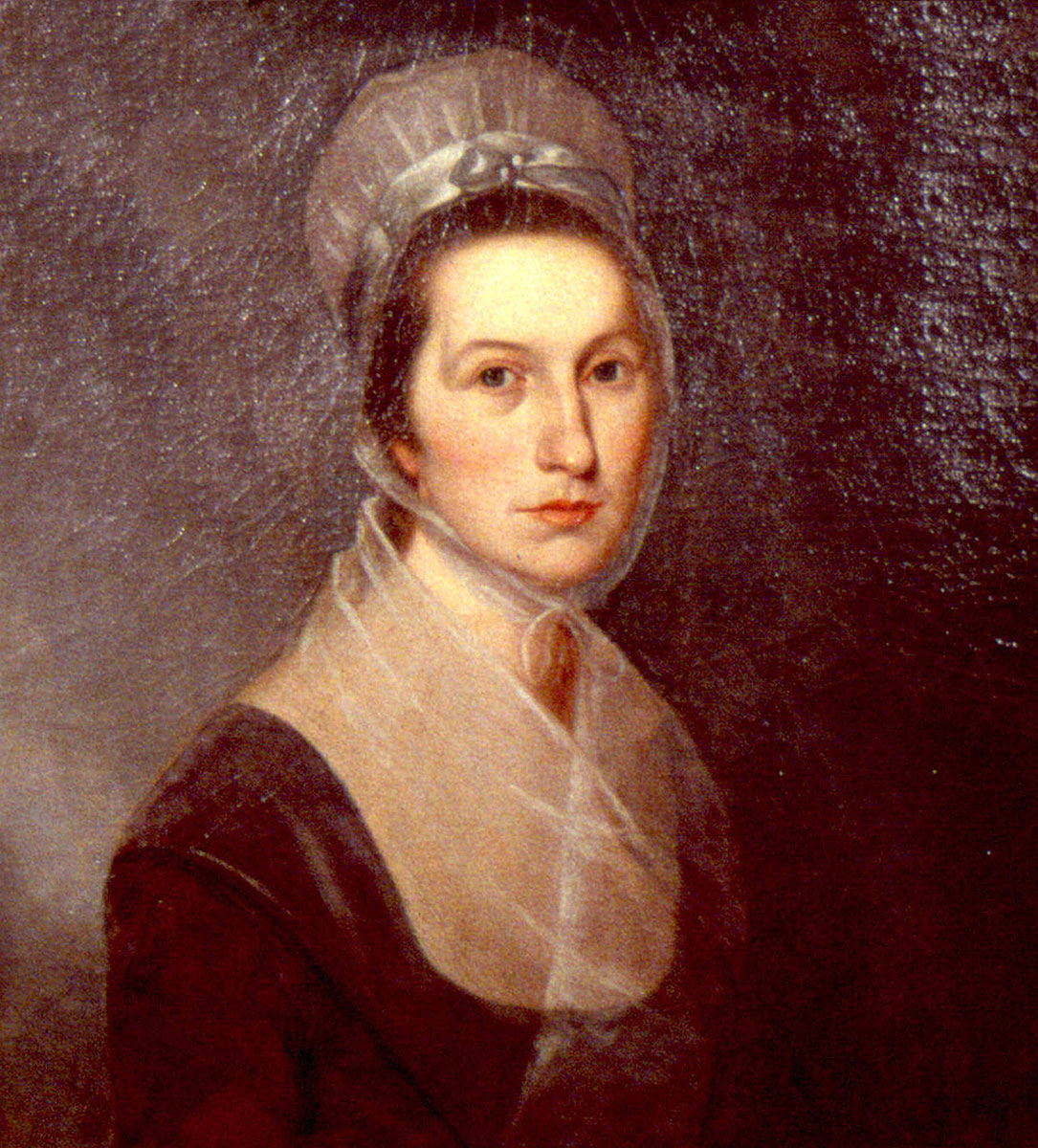

First Lady of Maryland

Personal details
- Born: July 12, 1762
- Died: April 30, 1814 (aged 51)
- Spouse: Charles Carnan Ridgely

Priscilla Dorsey Ridgely (July 12, 1762 – April 30, 1814) was First Lady of Maryland.

== Early life ==
Ridgely was born on July 12, 1762, in Anne Arundel County.

== Career ==
She managed the Hampton Mansion. In 1782, she married Charles Carnan Ridgely, who was Governor of Maryland from 1816 to 1819. She was a Methodist elder.

== Death and legacy ==
Ridgely died on April 30, 1814, in Baltimore County.
