= Priscilla Braislin =

First mathematics professor at Vassar College (1838–1888)

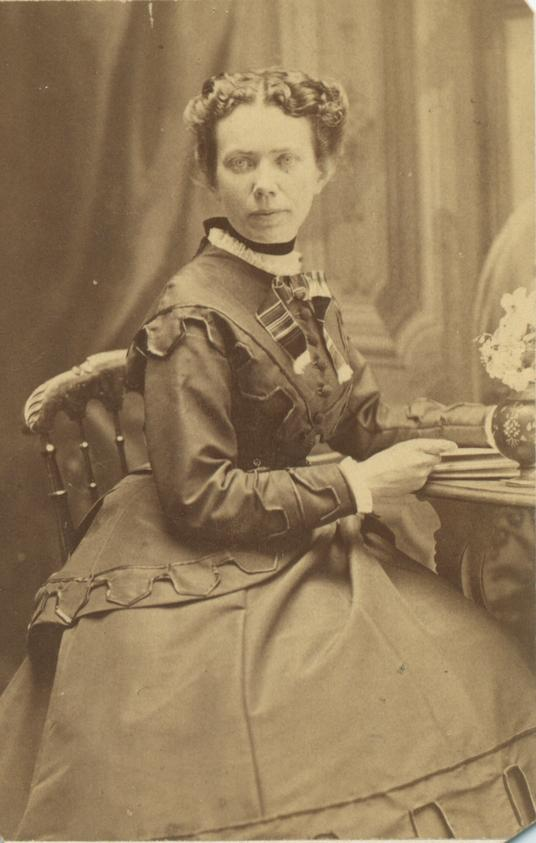
- Born: July 1838
- Died: December 15, 1888 (aged 50); Holyoke, Massachusetts
- Occupation: Educator
- Spouse: Timothy Merrick (1887-1888, her death)

Priscilla Harris Braislin Merrick (July 1838 – December 15, 1888) was the first mathematics professor at Vassar College.

== Early life ==
Braislin was originally from Burlington, New Jersey, the eldest of six children. Her father was Catholic and her mother Quaker, but with five of her siblings she became a Baptist; one of her brothers, Edward Braislin (1846–1915), became a Baptist minister.

== Vassar ==
She was hired around 1865 to teach mathematics at Vassar, within the Department of Mathematics, Natural Philosophy and Chemistry. When the head of the department, Charles Farrar, stepped down in 1874, Braislin became the chair of the newly formed Department of Mathematics, and appointed as an instructor of mathematics.

In 1875 she was elected as professor of mathematics. She was the first professor in the department and the first female professor at Vassar, in addition to being (after Susan Jane Cunningham at Swarthmore College in 1871) one of the first female professors of mathematics in the US.

She resigned in 1887, to marry Timothy Merrick, a wealthy businessman in Holyoke, Massachusetts. She died of heart disease at her Holyoke home the following year. On December 18, 1888, her funeral was held in Holyoke.

== Legacy ==
The Priscilla Braislin School for Girls in Bordentown, New Jersey was founded in 1889 and operated by two of Braislin's sisters, Alice G. Braislin and Mary Braislin Cooke.
