= Priscilla Pemu =

American physician

- Education: University of Benin; National Postgraduate Medical College of Nigeria
- Scientific career
- Workplaces: Morehouse School of Medicine; Morehouse College

Priscilla E. Pemu is a Nigerian-American physician who is Professor of Clinical Medicine at the Morehouse School of Medicine. She has campaigned for increased diversity in clinical trials and equitable participation of populations in medical research. She was elected to the National Academy of Medicine in 2024.

== Early life and education ==
Pemu studied at the University of Benin. She specialized in anesthesia at the National Postgraduate Medical College of Nigeria, and was a medical resident at Morehouse School of Medicine.

== Research and career ==
Pemu is a professor of clinical medicine at Morehouse College. Alongside clinical practice, her research has explored barriers that prevent communities engaging with clinical trials. These include restricted access to trial sites, reduced diversity among clinical investigators, the detrimental financial impacts of participation and mistrust. She has worked with Yale University and the Vanderbilt University School of Medicine on "Equitable Breakthroughs in Medicine Development", an initiative that looks to increase diversity in clinical trials. In 2019, Pemu was elected a TED Resident, an in-house incubator for breakthrough ideas, where she introduced Culturally Congruent Coaching.

Pemu has worked closely with the Community Physicians Network, an organization that looks to improve health outcomes for underserved patients.

Pemu was elected Fellow of the National Academy of Medicine in 2024.

== Selected publications ==
- Tanayott Thaweethai; Sarah E. Jolley; Elizabeth W. Karlson; et al. (13 June 2023). "Development of a Definition of Postacute Sequelae of SARS-CoV-2 Infection". JAMA. 329 (22): 1934. doi:10.1001/jama.2023.8823. ISSN 0098-7484. PMID 37278994. Wikidata Q124145663.
- Christine A Sorkness; Christine Pfund; Elizabeth O Ofili; et al. (4 December 2017). "A new approach to mentoring for research careers: the National Research Mentoring Network". BMC Proceedings. 11 (Suppl 12): 22. doi:10.1186/s12919-017-0083-8. ISSN 1753-6561. PMC 5773914. PMID 29375663. Wikidata Q47552729.
- Heval M Kelli; Muhammad Hammadah; Hina Ahmed; et al. (1 September 2017). "Association Between Living in Food Deserts and Cardiovascular Risk". Circulation: Cardiovascular Quality and Outcomes. 10 (9). doi:10.1161/circoutcomes.116.003532. ISSN 1941-7705. PMC 5810926. PMID 28904075. Wikidata Q40042550.
