= Priscilla Nyokabi Kanyua =

Woman Representative for Nyeri County
- In office 2013–2017
- President: Uhuru Kenyatta

Personal details
- Born: Priscilla Nyokabi Kanyua Kenya
- Education: University of Nairobi; Kenya School of Law
- Occupation: Lawyer, politician
- Known for: First Woman Representative for Nyeri County
- Awards: Top 40 Under 40 Women (2010, 2011)

Priscilla Nyokabi Kanyua is a Kenyan lawyer and politician. She was the first Woman Representative for Nyeri County.

== Early life and education ==
Nyokabi was born in Kenya.She pursued Bachelor of Laws at the University of Nairobi and Kenya School of Law.

Prior to joining active politics, she served as the Executive Director of Kituo cha Sheria, Complaints Commissioner at the Media Council of Kenya and also served as the Deputy Presiding Officer for Eastern Africa at the African Union's Economic, Social and Cultural Council .

== Political career ==
Priscilla Nyokabi Kanyua joined active politics in 2013 and she was elected as the first Woman Representative for Nyeri County. She served in the Kenyan parliament from 2013 to 2017 under The National Alliance. During this term, she was the chair to Caucus 47 and also she was an executive committee member of the Kenya Women Parliamentary Association.

She contested for the second time for Nyeri woman representative but lost to her rival Rahab Mukami Wachira.

== Career ==
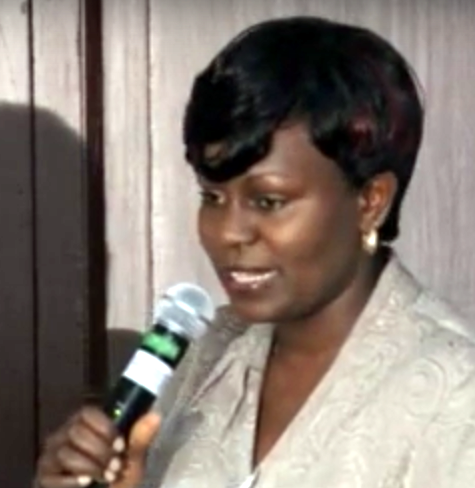
Priscilla Nyokabi Kanyua

Out of politics Nyokabi served in various public roles such as public administration and advocacy for women's rights. She was appointed a commissioner at the National Gender and Equality Commission by President Uhuru Kenyatta.

== Personal life ==
Priscilla Nyokabi Kanyua was nominated as one of the Top 40 in the under 40 women excelling in their careers in 2010 and 2011 by the Nation Media Group.

== See also ==
- Anyang Nyong’o
- National Gender and Equality Commission
- Uhuru Kenyatta
- Rahab Mukami Wachira
