= Priscilla Ann Goslin =

American graphic designer and author

- Born: Priscilla Ann Goslin; Minnesota, United States
- Occupations: Graphic designer and author
- Writing career
- Notable work: How to be a Carioca

Priscilla Ann Goslin is an American graphic designer who has spent much of her life in Rio de Janeiro. She is best known as the author of How to be a Carioca (The alternative guide for the tourist in Rio), which is a humorous guide for visitors to Rio de Janeiro, where the inhabitants are known as Cariocas. First published in 1992, the book was also the inspiration for a six-part Disney television series for Brazil with the same name, which was released in 2023.

== Early life ==
Goslin was born in the north of Minnesota, in the United States. Her father was a pilot for Pan Am who was posted to Rio de Janeiro, and she first went there at the age of six weeks. She attended the Graded School in São Paulo. She also lived in London, New York and San Francisco, where she obtained a Bachelor in Fine Arts degree in graphic design from the California College of the Arts. After she was married, her husband was transferred from the U.S. to São Paulo and, later, to Rio de Janeiro, where her second son was born. She has lived on and off in Rio for around 50 years.

== Career ==
Goslin worked for J. Walter Thompson and Salles Interamericana before founding her own company, DesignCorp, to providing design services related to corporate identity. She has also been partner and creative director of the design studio, S/2M2. An enthusiastic exponent of hang gliding at São Conrado Beach, through another of her companies, PEGE Promotions and Design, she organized the First International Invitational Camel Hang Gliding Challenge, sponsored by the R. J. Reynolds Tobacco Company in Brazil. This ten-day event involved 25 international pilots and 40 Brazilians.

== How to be a Carioca ==
The first edition of How to Be a Carioca was published in June 1992. As a resident of the city, Goslin was inspired to write the tongue-in-cheek book because she was always being asked to explain the particularities of the local culture to visitors. It has been described as a "survival manual" for the city that gives humorous tips to foreigners about the Carioca way of getting by in the so-called Cidade Maravilhosa. Goslin recruited her friend, Carlos Carneiro, to do amusing drawings for the book. In 1993 they produced a calendar on the same theme as the book, but after that Carneiro emigrated to Arizona in the U.S.

Goslin initially had difficulties in publishing the book, which was rejected by publishing houses. The one publisher who expressed interest insisted that the cover illustration of the statue of Christ on Corcovado ogling a bikini-clad girl would have to be removed, which was unacceptable to her. As a result, she decided to self-publish and ordered 3000 copies from a printer. She then had difficulties in persuading retailers to stock the book until the owner of a boutique bookstore allowed her to leave five copies in their shop on consignment. The next day, the book was seen by a prominent journalist who published a two-page article about it in Veja magazine. Her phone immediately began ringing from all the bookstores and publishers that had rejected her. That was when she established her publishing house, TwoCan Press. The book was later published in Portuguese with the phonetic name of Rau Tchu Bi A Carioca.

The book is regularly updated to reflect changes in technology and practices. For example, early issues discussed the orelhão (Big ear), which is the public telephone in an open cabinet, shaped like an ear. With the growth of mobile phones, these are now largely redundant. A ninth edition and 36th printing was produced in 2023, by which time over 350,000 copies of the book had been sold. Over the years she has also been working on a Carioca slang-English dictionary.

== Media appearances ==
Requests for media appearances and interviews followed the Veja article and Goslin is still being interviewed by the media. Her television appearances have included conversations with former Monty Python star, Michael Palin, who did a four-part television series on Brazil for the BBC, on Primetime with Diane Sawyer for the ABC and on Anthony Bourdain's A Cook's Tour. She has had articles written about her in Time, The New York Times, The Washington Post, and Reader's Digest among many others. Considered a sociological study, How to Be a Carioca is included in the syllabus at the University of Cambridge, as well as several other universities worldwide.

== The television series ==
The six-part television series in Portuguese, How To Be a Carioca , which was inspired by her book was for Goslin the culmination of 14 years of intellectual property negotiations and the creative process necessary to bring her words to the screen. The series was directed by Carlos Saldanha and stars Seu Jorge, Malu Mader, and Douglas Silva.

== Personal life ==
Goslin has two sons. She is a pianist and a retired rock climber as well as a retired hang glider pilot. When not in Rio de Janeiro, she spends time in Oregon, U.S.
