= Priscilla Baltimore =

Abolitionist and social worker

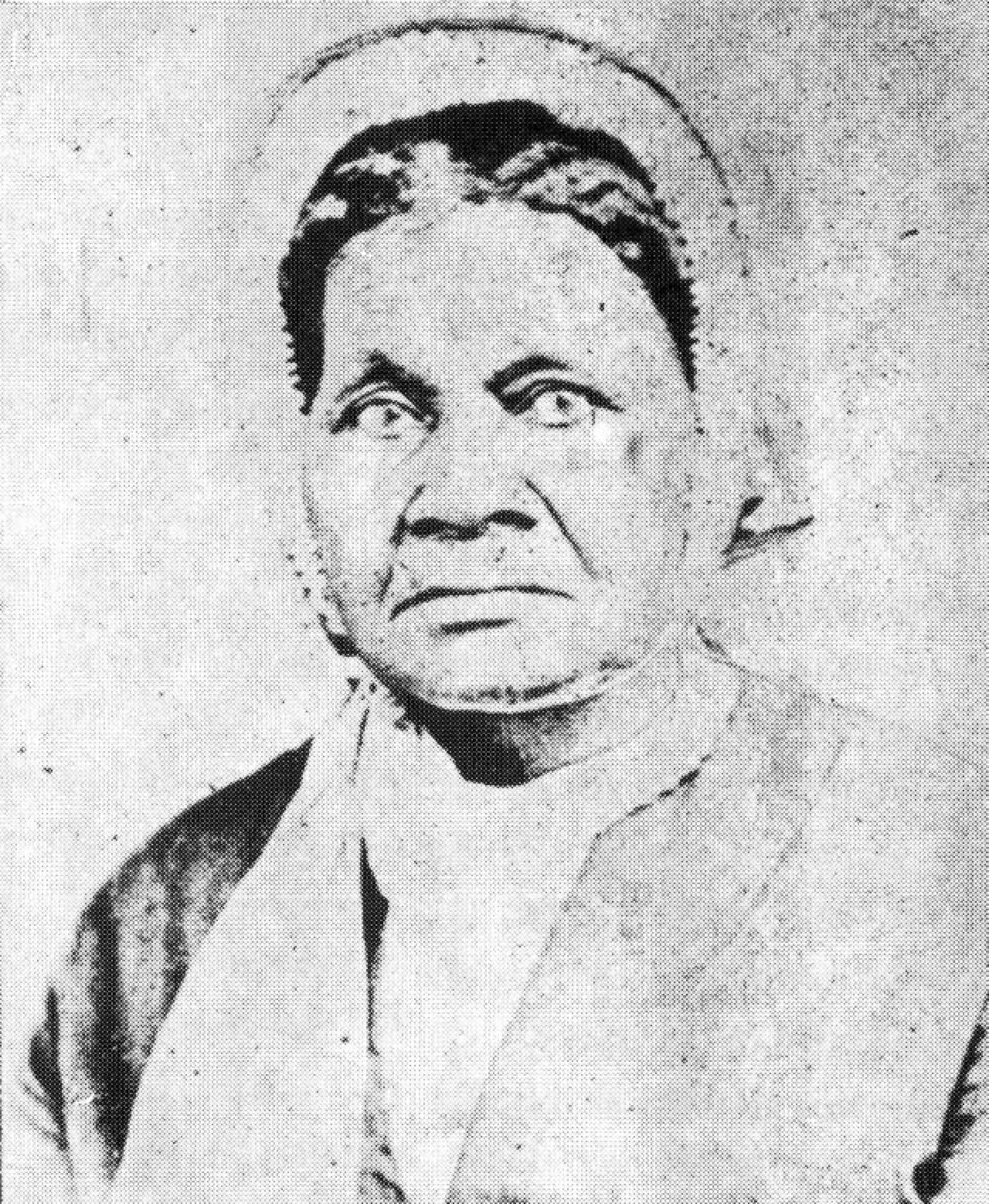
- Priscilla "Mother" Baltimore, undated photograph.
- Born: May 13, 1801; Bourbon County, Kentucky
- Died: November 28, 1882 (aged 81)

Priscilla "Mother" Baltimore (13 May 1801 – 28 November 1882, died age 81) was a Black, multiracial, abolitionist, nurse, and community organizer who was formerly enslaved. She adopted orphaned children and assisted former slaves. She is also known as the founder of Brooklyn, Illinois.

== Early life ==
She was born in Bourbon County, Kentucky in 1801, the child of a white slaveowner and one of his slaves. Her father sold her at age 10. Later, in St. Louis, she was bought by a Methodist missionary who allowed her to buy her own freedom. It took her seven years to earn enough money.

Once free, she set out in search of her father. He had moved from Kentucky to southern Missouri. Having found him, she bought her mother from him. She brought her mother back to St. Louis. She also purchased the freedom of her husband, John, but eventually divorced him in 1856. She became esteemed among St. Louis aristocracy as a well-trained nurse and earned up to $150 per visit.

== Founding of Brooklyn, abolitionism ==
In 1829, she fled St. Louis, and Missouri (a slave state), crossing the Mississippi with eleven black families, and, on the opposite bank, founded Brooklyn, Illinois, described as a freedom village, according to local oral histories (a village where the inhabitants could, despite the "black codes" in law at the time, live more freely, including escaped slaves legally liable to recapture). She may have subsequently made the trip again; there are records of her in St. Louis in the 1830s. She helped found two African Methodist Episcopal Churches (AME churches), one (St. Paul's) in St Louis, and one (Quinn Chapel) in Brooklyn.

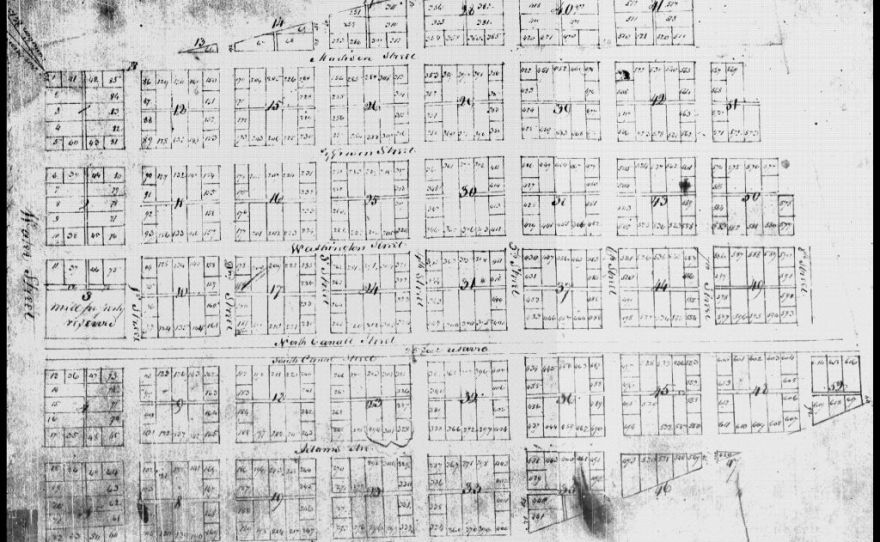
The 1837 plat, showing Priscilla Baltimore's plot near the top right, lot 521 on Madison near 6th Street.

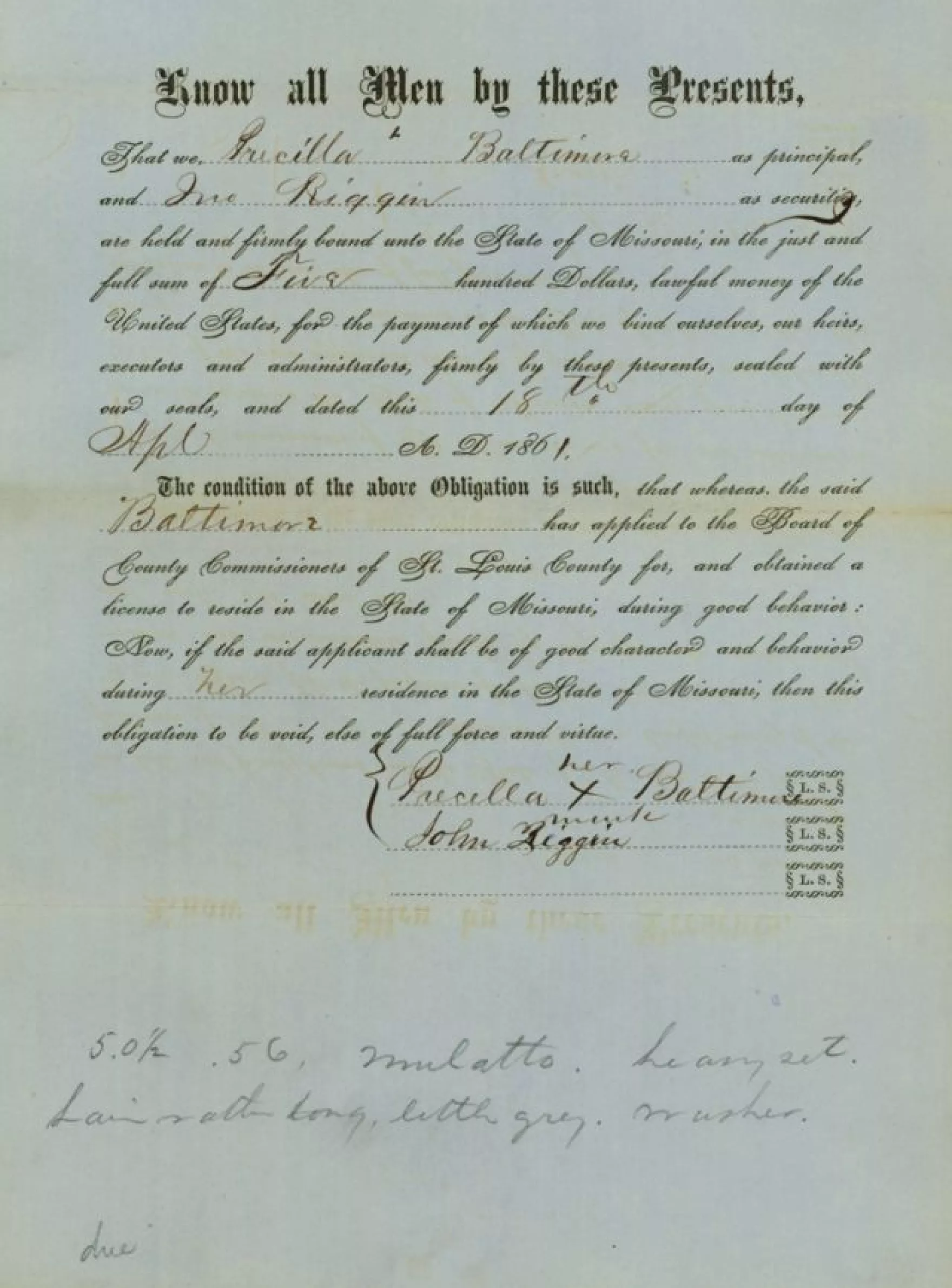
1861 "Free Negro Bond" of a "Pricilla Baltimore", washer. Missouri History Museum.

The land the families settled was owned by a white farmer named Thomas Osburn. In 1837 he and four other white landowners had it platted (had a cadastral survey carried out). There are records of Priscilla Baltimore living in Brooklyn in 1839, and in 1851, she bought lot 521, on Madison Street, in the second house east of 6th Street. She built a simple wood-frame house there. The site was studied in an archeological dig in 2014.

In 1861, one "Pricilla Baltimore" (sic), occupation "washer", paid $500 as a "Free Negro Bond" to the State of Missouri.

Brooklyn became a major place of Underground Railroad activity. Priscilla Baltimore's degree of involvement in this is not known, but she was a very active abolitionist at the time, and the Quinn Chapel, with which she was closely involved, was very active in helping escapees, as were a network of other strategically placed AME churches. After the end of the US Civil War in 1865, Priscilla Baltimore was active in social and religious organizations helping freed slaves coming north.

In 1873, Brooklyn voted to incorporate, the first American majority-black community to do so.

When Priscilla Baltimore died in 1882, there were two articles written about her in the St. Louis Daily Globe-Democrat, an unusual amount of coverage for a black woman at that time. The location of her unmarked grave was found again in 2008. The Brooklyn Historical Society fundraised and installed a headstone in 2010.

Brooklyn is the only known black town founded in the US in the 1800s that survives as a living community. Priscilla Baltimore is still locally remembered and respected as the founding mother of the town.
