= Priscilla (singer, born 1990) =

Brazilian singer, songwriter and dancer

- Born: Priscilla Florencio; April 9, 1990 (age 36); Belo Horizonte, Brazil
- Genres: Pop; dance-pop; electropop
- Occupations: Singer; songwriter; dancer
- Years active: 2013–present

Priscilla Florencio (born April 9, 1990) is a Brazilian singer, songwriter and dancer. In 2016, Priscilla was discovered by Brazilian music producer Dj Batutinha who then introduced Priscilla to music manager Kamilla Fialho, CEO of K2L Entertainment. K2L Entertainment was the management firm behind Brazilian music stars Anitta (singer) and Lexa (singer). Priscilla signed with K2L in April 2016. She began releasing music independently before signing with Warner Music Brazil in 2020. In 2022, she joined Virgin Music Brasil, a division of Universal Music Group, under which she released singles including "Molhadinha" featuring MC Niack and "Sumidinha".

== Early life ==
Born in Belo Horizonte, Brazil, Priscilla discovered her passion for performing at the age of six. She began to showcase her talent in her local community and won a local dance competition in which she was the youngest competitor. She became a regular at Brazilian theatre Teatro Marilia, and moved on to make several appearances on various Brazilian television shows. At the age of 17, Priscilla moved to Portugal where she attended college and earned her Master's degree in Psychology. After graduating from college, Priscilla moved to Los Angeles, California in 2014 to pursue her music career.
