= David Friess =

American politician (born 1960s)

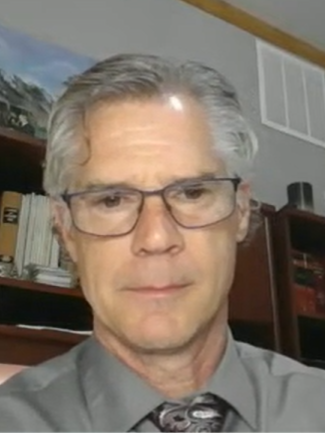
- Friess in 2026

Member of the Illinois House of Representatives from the 115th district
- Incumbent
- Assumed office January 13, 2021
- Preceded by: Nathan Reitz

Personal details
- Born: 1968 or 1969 (age 58) Southern Illinois, U.S.
- Spouse: Miki (m. 1989)
- Children: 2
- Education: Mercer University (BS); Atlanta's John Marshall Law School (JD)

Military service
- Allegiance: United States
- Branch/service: United States Air Force; Air Force Reserves
- Battles/wars: Gulf War

David Friess is a Republican member of the Illinois House from the 116th district since January 13, 2021. The 116th district, located in part of the Metro East, includes all or parts of Baldwin, Cahokia, Chester, Columbia, Coulterville, Cutler, Darmstadt, Du Quoin, Dupo, East Carondelet, Ellis Grove, Evansville, Fayetteville, Floraville, Fults, Hecker, Kaskaskia, Lenzburg, Maeystown, Marissa, Millstadt, New Athens, Paderborn, Percy, Pinckneyville, Prairie du Rocher, Red Bud, Rockwood, Ruma, Sauget, Smithton, Sparta, St. Libory, Steeleville, Tilden, Valmeyer, Waterloo, and Willisville.

Friess was elected to the district after defeating appointed Democratic incumbent Nathan Reitz.

== Early life, education, and career ==
Friess was born in Southern Illinois and grew up in Chester. He attended and graduated from Chester High School. Immediately after graduating, Friess joined the United States Air Force as an aircraft mechanic. After completing his active duty obligation, he joined the Air Force Reserves as a flight engineer and crew chief of the Lockheed C-141 Starlifter and stationed in Charleston, South Carolina. During his time in the reserves, he served in the Gulf War. After retiring from the Air Force, Friess worked for Delta Air Lines in Atlanta briefly as an aircraft mechanic. He earned his Bachelor of Science in Criminal Justice from Mercer University and earned his Juris Doctor from Atlanta's John Marshall Law School. He is a member of the Randolph County Bar Association.

As of July 3, 2022, Representative Friess is a member of the following Illinois House committees:

- Appropriations - Public Safety Committee (HAPP)
- Elementary & Secondary Education: School Curriculum & Policies Committee (HELM)
- Judiciary - Criminal Committee (HJUC)
- Natural Gas Subcommittee (HPUB-NGAS)
- Public Utilities Committee (HPUB)
- State Government Administration Committee (HSGA)

== Political career ==
=== 2018 ===
Friess first ran for the 116th district in the 2018 Illinois House of Representatives election. He ran unopposed in the primary and in the general election ran against Democratic then-incumbent Jerry Costello II. He lost in the general election by an 8-point margin.

=== 2020 ===
In 2019, Friess' previous opponent Costello was appointed by Governor J. B. Pritzker as director of law enforcement for the Illinois Department of Natural Resources. Democrat Nathan Reitz, son of Dan Reitz (the state Representative of the district before Costello), was appointed to fill Costello's remaining term. Friess ran again for the district in a crowded Republican primary. His fellow primary opponents were David Holder, a CPA and governmental auditor, and Kevin Schmidt, a chiropractor. Friess won the nomination with 41.51% of the vote. He faced off against Reitz in the general election. He improved over his previous margin by defeating appointed incumbent Reitz by a 30-point margin.

== Electoral history ==
Illinois 116th State House District Republican Primary, 2018
Party	Candidate	Votes	%
Republican	David Friess	5,362	100.0
Total votes		5,362	100.0

Illinois 116th State House District General Election, 2018
Party	Candidate	Votes	%
Democratic	Jerry Costello II (incumbent)	22,429	53.52
Republican	David Friess	19,480	46.48
Total votes		41,909	100.0

Illinois 116th State House District Republican Primary, 2020
Party	Candidate	Votes	%
Republican	David Friess	2,956	41.51
Republican	Kevin Schmidt	2,229	31.30
Republican	David M Holder	1,936	27.19
Total votes		7,121	100.0

Illinois 116th State House District General Election, 2020
Party	Candidate	Votes	%
Republican	David Friess	34,595	64.83
Democratic	Nathan Reitz (incumbent)	18,765	35.17
Total votes		53,360	100.0

== Personal life ==
Friess and his wife Miki currently reside in Red Bud, Illinois with their two children. He is a member of Ebenezer Church in Rockwood, Illinois. He is a member of the Red Bud VFW and the Chester American Legion. He currently coaches for his children in youth sports.
