= National Register of Historic Places listings in Monroe County, Illinois =

Location of Monroe County in Illinois

This is a list of the National Register of Historic Places listings in Monroe County, Illinois.

This is intended to be a complete list of the properties and districts on the National Register of Historic Places in Monroe County, Illinois, United States. Latitude and longitude coordinates are provided for many National Register properties and districts; these locations may be seen together in a map.

There are 7 properties and districts listed on the National Register in the county. Another property was once listed but has been removed.

This National Park Service list is complete through NPS recent listings posted March 21, 2025.

== Current listings ==
	Name on the Register	Image	Date listed	Location	City or town	Description
1	Fountain Creek Bridge	Fountain Creek Bridge	December 22, 1978 (#78001176)	Off Illinois Route 156; 38°19′33″N 90°11′45″W	Waterloo	
2	French Colonial Historic District	French Colonial Historic District	April 3, 1974 (#74000772)	From Fort Chartres State Park to Kaskaskia Island; 38°07′01″N 90°12′30″W	Prairie du Rocher	Extends into Randolph County
3	Gundlach-Grosse House	Gundlach-Grosse House	December 18, 1978 (#78001173)	625 N. Main St. 38°26′54″N 90°12′17″W	Columbia	
4	Lunsford-Pulcher Archeological Site	Lunsford-Pulcher Archeological Site	July 23, 1973 (#73000712)	Western side of Oklahoma Hill Rd. 38°29′40″N 90°13′52″W	Columbia	Extends into St. Clair County
5	Maeystown Historic District	Maeystown Historic District	June 23, 1978 (#78001174)	Illinois Route 7; 38°13′34″N 90°14′01″W	Maeystown	
6	Peterstown House	Peterstown House	November 16, 1977 (#77000489)	275 N. Main St. 38°20′32″N 90°09′03″W	Waterloo	
7	Waterloo Historic District	Waterloo Historic District	December 1, 1978 (#78001177)	Most of the central portion of the city, roughly bounded by Morrison, Moore, Konigsmark, and Hickory/Oak/Elm; 38°20′06″N 90°09′06″W	Waterloo	

== Former listing ==
	Name on the Register	Image	Date listed	Date removed	Location	City or town	Description
1	Stephen W. Miles House		November 28, 1978 (#78001175)	October 4, 1982	Northwest of Valmeyer off Illinois Route 156	Valmeyer	Demolished.

== See also ==
- List of National Historic Landmarks in Illinois
- National Register of Historic Places listings in Illinois
