= WDQN =

WDQN may refer to:

- WDQN (AM), a radio station (1580 AM) licensed to Du Quoin, Illinois, United States
- WDQN-FM, a radio station (95.9 FM) licensed to Du Quoin, Illinois, United States
