= Ray Rippelmeyer =

American baseball player (1933–2022)

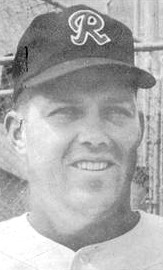
- Pitcher
- Born: July 9, 1933; Valmeyer, Illinois, U.S.
- Died: September 9, 2022 (aged 89); Waterloo, Illinois, U.S.
- Batted: Right Threw: Right

MLB debut
- April 14, 1962, for the Washington Senators

Last MLB appearance
- July 1, 1962, for the Washington Senators

MLB statistics
- Win–loss record: 1–2
- Earned run average: 5.49
- Strikeouts: 17
- Stats at Baseball Reference

Teams
- As player: Washington Senators (1962); As coach: Philadelphia Phillies (1970–1978)

Raymond Roy Rippelmeyer (July 9, 1933 – September 9, 2022) was an American professional baseball player and pitching coach. During his 12-season active career, he was a 6 ft 3 in (1.91 m), 200 lb (91 kg) right-handed pitcher who spent part of one year in Major League Baseball as a member of the 1962 Washington Senators. He coached for the Philadelphia Phillies from 1970 to 1978.

== Playing career ==
Rippelmeyer was born on July 9, 1933, and grew up on a family farm near Valmeyer, Illinois. He attended Valmeyer High School, and played on the baseball and basketball teams. He graduated in 1951. He played college baseball and college basketball for the Southern Illinois Salukis. In 1953, his basketball teammates named him their most valuable player.

Ripplemeyer signed with the Milwaukee Braves in 1954. No longer eligible to play basketball in the National Collegiate Athletic Association, he transferred to Southeast Missouri State University to play for the Southeast Missouri State Redhawks in the National Association of Intercollegiate Athletics. He spent eight full seasons in the minor leagues, in the farm systems of the Braves and Cincinnati Reds.

The Washington Senators selected Ripplemeyer in the Rule 5 draft on November 27, 1961. He made the 1962 Senators Opening Day roster and appeared in 18 games, 17 of them in relief. Rippelmeyer won his first major league game on June 1, 1962, against the Minnesota Twins, pitching two hitless innings and striking out one as Washington won in extra innings 4–3 on a home run by Chuck Hinton. One month later, on July 1, Rippelmeyer made his only start against the same team, but he lasted only 3 2/3 innings, surrendered two two-run homers (to Lenny Green and Bernie Allen), and left the game trailing, 4–0. The Senators eventually fell, 9–0. It was his last major league appearance; in 391/3 innings pitched over his 18 games, he had a 1–2 win–loss record, a 5.73 earned run average and 17 strikeouts, allowing 24 earned runs, 47 hits and 17 walks.

Ten days later, the Senators returned Rippelmeyer to the Cincinnati organization. He was sold to the San Diego Padres of the Triple-A Pacific Coast League, and pitched for them into middle of the 1965 season, when he retired.

== Coaching career ==
Ripplemeyer was hired as the manage the Short Season Class A Aberdeen Pheasants in the Baltimore Orioles' system in June 1965. He became a pitching coach in 1966 with the Triple-A Padres.

Ripplemeyer became the pitching coach of the Philadelphia Phillies in 1970. After the 1972 season, Rippelmeyer was one of five finalists for their managerial position. Rippelmeyer coached for three National League East Division champions (1976–1978). He was a minor-league pitching instructor in the Phillies farm system both before and after his assignment with the major-league staff.

== Personal life ==
Rippelmeyer and his wife, Glenda Faye (née Jones), married in 1955 and had four children. She died in 2015. He died on September 9, 2022, at age 89.

Sporting positions
Preceded by Al Widmar	Philadelphia Phillies pitching coach 1970–1978	Succeeded by Herm Starrette
