= Terry Deering =

American politician (1958–1997)

Member of the Illinois House of Representatives from the 116th district 115th District (1991-1993)
- In office January 1991 – June 1997
- Preceded by: Charles Goforth (115th)
- Succeeded by: Dan Reitz (116th)

Personal details
- Born: November 7, 1958 DuQuoin, Illinois, US
- Died: June 27, 1997 (aged 38) Near Du Bois, Illinois, US
- Party: Democratic
- Spouse: Reita Jean
- Children: Three
- Occupation: Coal Miner

Terry Deering (November 7, 1958 – June 26, 1997) was an American legislator and coal miner who served as a Democratic member of the Illinois House of Representatives from January 1991 until his death in June 1997.

== Biographical sketch ==
Born in DuQuoin, Illinois, Deering went to Nashville High School in Nashville, Illinois. He was a coal miner and then served as Mayor of Du Bois, Illinois. In the 1990 general election Deering defeated Republican incumbent Charles Wayne Goforth in what was regarded as an upset. He served in the Illinois House of Representatives, as a Democrat, from 1990 until his death. He died in an auto accident near Du Bois, Illinois. Local Democratic Party leaders appointed Dan Reitz, a County Commissioner in Randolph County, to succeed Deering.
