= Jerry Costello II =

American politician

Illinois Director of Agriculture
- Incumbent
- Assumed office February 28, 2020
- Governor: JB Pritzker
- Preceded by: John M. Sullivan

Member of the Illinois House of Representatives from the 116th district
- In office July 25, 2011 – May 7, 2019
- Preceded by: Dan Reitz
- Succeeded by: Nathan Reitz

Personal details
- Born: February 13, 1969 (age 57) Belleville, Illinois
- Party: Democratic
- Spouse: Lori Costello
- Children: Three
- Education: Southern Illinois University
- Occupation: Financial adviser Police officer (former)

Military service
- Allegiance: United States
- Branch/service: United States Army
- Unit: 82nd Airborne Division
- Battles/wars: Operation Desert Storm

Jerry Costello (born February 13, 1969) is the Director of the Illinois Department of Agriculture. Prior, he served as a member of the Illinois House of Representatives from 2011 to 2019. until his resignation in May 2019. He is a member of the Democratic Party.

== Early and personal life ==
He is the son of former U.S. Representative Jerry Costello, whose district overlapped his son's. After Desert Storm, he worked as a police officer is Sauget, Illinois for six years.

== Legislative career ==
Democratic incumbent Dan Reitz resigned from the Illinois House of Representatives effective June 25, 2011. The Democratic Representative Committee of the 116th Representative District appointed Costello to fill the resulting vacancy for the remainder of 97th General Assembly. On July 25, 2011, Costello was sworn into office. The 116th district includes all or parts of Cahokia, Chester, Columbia, Dupo, East Carondelet, East St. Louis, Red Bud, Smithton, Sparta and Waterloo. After the 2011 decennial reapportionment, the 116th district retained its territory and was extended eastward to add Du Quoin to the district. Costello resigned from the Illinois House of Representatives effective May 7, 2019, to become the Director of Law Enforcement at the Illinois Department of Natural Resources. The Democratic Representative Committee of the 116th Representative District appointed Nathan Reitz, a village trustee for Steeleville, to fill the vacancy. Reitz took office on May 9, 2019.

== Executive branch ==
In 2018, Jerry Costello Jr. was named by J. B. Pritzker a member of the Prtizker's Agriculture Transition Committee. On February 28, 2020, Governor Pritzker announced his appointment of Costello to serve as the Director of the Illinois Department of Agriculture. On April 20, 2021, Costello was confirmed by the Illinois Senate.
