= Nathan Reitz =

American politician

Nathan D. Reitz

Member of the Illinois House of Representatives from the 116th district
- In office May 9, 2019 – January 13, 2021
- Preceded by: Jerry Costello II
- Succeeded by: David Friess

Personal details
- Born: December 28, 1976 (age 49)
- Party: Democratic

Nathan D. Reitz is a former Democratic member of the Illinois House of Representatives from the 116th district. The 116th, located in Southern Illinois, includes all or portions of Monroe, Perry, Randolph, and St. Clair counties. Reitz was appointed to office after Jerry Costello II was appointed by J. B. Pritzker to be director of law enforcement for the Illinois Department of Natural Resources. Nathan Reitz, the son of former Representative Dan Reitz, previously served as an alderman in Steeleville, Illinois.

In the 2020 general election, Reitz lost to Republican candidate David Friess by a large margin.
