= Community Unit School District 300 (disambiguation) =

Community Unit School District 300 could refer to:

- Community Unit School District 300 in Kane County and a small part of McHenry County, Illinois — based in Algonquin, Illinois
- Du Quoin Community Unit School District 300 in Perry County, Illinois
- Savanna Community Unit District 300 in Carroll County, Illinois — merged into West Carroll Community Unit District 314
- Rockridge Community Unit School District 300 in Rock Island County, Illinois — based in Taylor Ridge, Illinois
- Sullivan Community Unit School District 300 in Moultrie County, Illinois
