= Kaskaskia–Cahokia Trail =

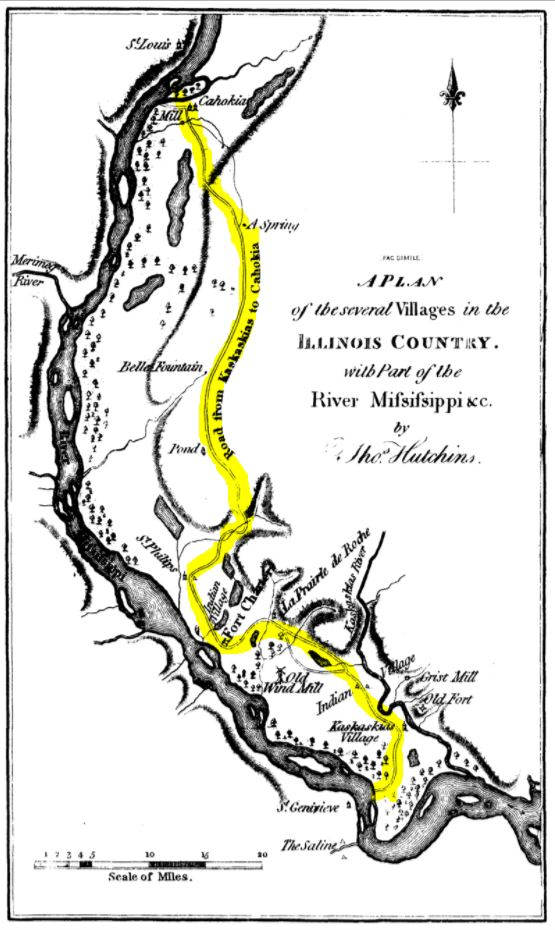
1778 map by Thomas Hutchins of the French settlements in the Illinois Country showing the "Road from Kaskaskias to Cahokia" highlighted in yellow

The Kaskaskia–Cahokia Trail was the first road in Illinois, running from Kaskaskia to Cahokia. It was used for walking and stagecoaches.

== History ==
=== Native Americans ===
The Confederated Peorias originated in the land surrounding the Great Lakes and drained by the Mississippi River. Those peoples are the Illinois or the Ilini Indians, descendants of the people who created the large mound societies in the Great Plains two to three thousand years ago. The Kaskaskia–Cahokia Trail had a role in the lives of some Ilini Indians.

=== Settlers ===
When the French created permanent settlements at Kaskaskia and Cahokia, they named these townships after the Illini Indians who lived there before.

Other villages, towns, and settlements grew over the next century dotting the east half of the Mississippi River's floodplain. This first road caused other roads that eventually led to Illinois becoming the 21st state in 1818, with Kaskaskia holding the title of the first state capital.

== Points of interest ==
There are many interesting attractions along the Kaskaskia–Cahokia Trail such as:

- Pierre Menard House
- Mississippi River Ferry
- Modoc Rock Shelter
- Creole House
- Village Hall
- St. Joseph Church
- Fort de Chartres
- St. Joseph Church
- Historic District
- Peterstown House
- Waterloo Historic District
- Bellefontain House & Spring
- Moore Cemetery
- KCT Remnant with Stone Arch Bridge
