= Senator Kent =

Senator Kent may refer to:

- Joseph Kent (1779–1837), U.S. Senator from Maryland from 1833 to 1837
- Marvin Kent (1816–1908), Ohio State Senate
- Mary Lou Kent (1921–1981), Illinois State Senate
- Moss Kent (1766–1838), New York State Senate
- Susan Kent (politician) (born 1963), Minnesota State Senate

== See also ==
- Martha Kent, fictional adoptive mother of Superman and U.S. Senator from Kansas in the TV series, Smallville
