= Nick Hill =

American football player and coach (born 1985)

Southern Illinois Salukis
- Title: Head coach

Personal information
- Born: April 5, 1985 (age 41); Du Quoin, Illinois, U.S.
- Listed height: 6 ft 3 in (1.91 m)
- Listed weight: 210 lb (95 kg)

Career information
- Position: Quarterback
- High school: DuQuoin (Du Quoin, Illinois)
- College: Southern Illinois (2004–2007)
- NFL draft: 2008: undrafted

Career history

Playing
- Chicago Bears (2008)*; Rio Grande Valley Dorados (2009); Orlando Predators (2010–2011); Tampa Bay Storm (2012); Green Bay Packers (2012)*; Tampa Bay Storm (2012)*; San Antonio Talons (2013)
- * Offseason or practice squad member only

Coaching
- Carbondale Community HS (IL) (2013) Head coach; Southern Illinois (2014–2015) co-offensive coordinator & quarterbacks coach; Southern Illinois (2016–present) Head coach

Awards and highlights
- First-team Gateway All-Academic (2006); CoSIDA/ESPN The Magazine Academic All-District V (2006); First-team All-Gateway (2007); Gateway All-Academic honorable mention (2007); Sports Network All-America honorable mention (2007); 2x Gateway Offensive Player of the Week (2007); College Sporting News Offensive Player of the Week (2007)

Career AFL statistics
- Comp. / Att.: 990 / 1,507
- Passing yards: 11,684
- TD–INT: 218–49
- QB rating: 111.75
- Rushing TD: 36
- Stats at ArenaFan.com

Head coaching record
- Regular season: 57–62 (college)
- Postseason: 3–3 (NCAA D-I playoffs)
- Career: 57–62 (college); 5–5 (high school)

Nick Hill (born April 5, 1985) is an American football coach and former quarterback. He is the head football coach at his alma mater, Southern Illinois University. Hill was signed by the Chicago Bears of the National Football League (NFL) as an undrafted free agent in 2008. He then played professionally in the Arena Football League (AFL) and in the af2. He played college football at Southern Illinois.

== Early life ==
Hill attended Du Quoin High School where he was a three-year starter in football. He played basketball as well. As a junior, he was a First-team All-State selection in basketball, averaging 26.7 points, 6.0 rebounds and 2.4 assists. As a senior, he was a First-team All-State selection again after averaging 22.7 points, 7.7 rebounds, 5.7 assists and 3.0 steals. In football, he was a First-team All-State and First-team All-Conference selection after passing for 1,451 yards, 19 touchdowns and one interception, and also rushing for 543 yards, and 11 touchdowns. He became the school's first 4,000-career yard passer in 35 years, the first since former major league pitcher Don Stanhouse in 1968.

== College career ==
Hill originally attended Western Kentucky University where he played on the basketball team and averaged 1.7 points-per-game in 23 games. He then transferred to Southern Illinois University where he was three-year letterman and two-year starter on the football team.

Hill redshirted during his first season at Southern Illinois after transferring from Western Kentucky. As a redshirt sophomore, he played in four games, completing 16-of-20 passes for 288 yards and three touchdowns. He also rushed the ball nine times for 102 yards and one touchdown. As a junior, he started all 13 games, and ranked second in the conference and seventh in the nation in passing efficiency (156.7). He completed 121-of-196 passes (61.7%) for 1,721 yards, 15 touchdowns and four interceptions. He was the team's third-leading rusher with 91 carries for 382 yards and six touchdowns. He was a First-team Gateway Conference All-Academic and CoSIDA/ESPN The Magazine Academic All-District V.

As a senior, he led the conference in passing yards-per-game with 226.8, total offense with 252.3 and ranked second in passing efficiency (167.1), which was also third in the nation. He set school single season records in passing; yards (3,175), touchdowns (28), completions (258) and attempts (361). He was named a First-team All-Conference, Gateway All-Academic and Sports Network All-America honorable mention. He was honored as Gateway Offensive Player of the Week, twice, and College Sporting News Offensive Player of the Week, once. He finished sixth in the voting for the Walter Payton Award, given to the top player in the Football Championship Subdivision. He also set a school single-game record with 436 passing yards at Northern Iowa, and passed for 200 yards or more in nine games. He ranked second on the team with 121 carries for 357 yards and four touchdowns. For his career, Hill completed 394-of-577 passes (68.3%) for 5,184 yards, 46 touchdowns and 11 interceptions, while rushing 221 times for 841 yards (3.8 avg) and 11 touchdowns. He led Southern Illinois to a 21–6 record as a starter. He also played in the Texas vs. The Nation All-Star Bowl. While in college, he majored in Special Education.

== Professional career ==
Hill went unselected in the 2008 NFL draft, however on April 27, 2008, Hill signed a three-year contract as an undrafted free agent with the Chicago Bears. During Training Camp, Hill competed with Caleb Hanie for the Bears' third quarterback spot on the depth chart behind Kyle Orton and Rex Grossman. The Bears chose to keep Hanie as their practice squad quarterback and Hill was waived by the Bears on July 29.

After not playing in the National Football League in 2008, Hill joined af2, a professional arena football league. On January 15, 2009, he was assigned to the Rio Grande Valley Dorados.

Hill caught on with the Orlando Predators for the 2010 AFL season. He would become the starter midway through the season, and be the starter for the entire 2011 season. He was then set to join the Tampa Bay Storm in 2012 until he was signed by the Packers.

On January 20, 2012, Hill joined the Green Bay Packers and wore jersey #17. On May 23, 2012, he was released by the Packers. He played for the Storm in 2012 after being released by the Packers.

In April 2013, Hill signed with the San Antonio Talons to replace injured quarterback John Dutton.

== Coaching career ==
Hill was the head coach for the Carbondale Terriers in Carbondale, Illinois for one season in 2013.

On January 13, 2014, Hill was announced as the QB coach and co-offensive coordinator for the Southern Illinois Salukis.

On December 1, 2015, it was announced Hill would be the Salukis interim head coach after the firing of Dale Lennon. On January 4, 2016, SIU removed the interim tag and made Hill their next head football coach.

== Head coaching record ==
=== College ===
Year	Team	Overall	Conference	Standing	Bowl/playoffs	Coaches^{#}	STATS^{°}
Southern Illinois (Missouri Valley Football Conference) (2016–present)
2016	Southern Illinois	4–7	2–6	T–8th			
2017	Southern Illinois	4–7	2–6	T–8th			
2018	Southern Illinois	2–9	1–7	10th			
2019	Southern Illinois	7–5	5–3	T–3rd		25	
2020–21	Southern Illinois	6–4	3–3	5th	L NCAA Division I Quarterfinal	14	14
2021	Southern Illinois	8–5	5–3	T–3rd	L NCAA Division I Second Round	17	16
2022	Southern Illinois	5–6	4–4	T–6th			
2023	Southern Illinois	8–5	4–4	T–7th	L NCAA Division I Second Round	13	12
2024	Southern Illinois	4–8	2–6	T–8th			
2025	Southern Illinois	7–5	4–4	T–6th			25
2026	Southern Illinois	5–7	3–5	T–6th			
Southern Illinois:		60–68	35–51				
Total:		60–68					

=== High school ===
Year	Team	Overall	Conference	Standing	Bowl/playoffs
Carbondale Terriers () (2013)
2013	Carbondale	5–5	1–4	6th	
Carbondale:		5–5	1–4		
Total:		5–5			
