= John M. Sullivan (politician) =

American politician (born 1959)

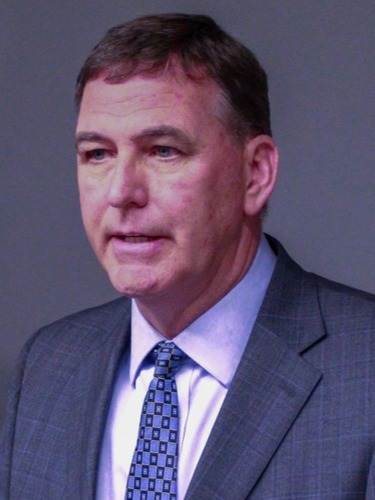
- Sullivan at an IEMA press conference (2019)

Illinois Director of Agriculture
- In office 2019–2020
- Governor: J. B. Pritzker
- Preceded by: Raymond Poe
- Succeeded by: Jerry Costello II

Member of the Illinois Senate from the 47th district
- In office January 2003 – January 2017
- Preceded by: Laura Kent Donahue
- Succeeded by: Jil Tracy

Personal details
- Born: January 9, 1959 (age 67) Macomb, Illinois
- Party: Democratic
- Spouse: Joan Sullivan
- Children: Four
- Education: Quincy University
- Profession: Businessman

John M. Sullivan (born January 9, 1959) is an American politician and the former Director of the Illinois Department of Agriculture. Prior to this, he served as a Democratic member of the Illinois Senate for the 47th district of Illinois from 2003 to 2017.

== Early life and career ==
John Sullivan was born in Macomb in 1959. He graduated from Quincy University with a bachelor's degree in history. He went on to work as an agricultural loan officer before joining Sullivan's Auctioneers, the family's successful auction and real estate business. He currently lives on the family farm north of Rushville with his wife, three sons and one daughter.

== State senator ==
Sullivan was elected in 2002, defeating 22-year Republican incumbent Laura Kent Donahue in one of the closest and most expensive senate races that election cycle. The district, the largest in the state includes all of Adams, Brown, Cass, Hancock, Henderson, Mason, McDonough, Schuyler, Warren counties and portions of Fulton and Knox counties.

Since he represented a historically Republican district, Sullivan was targeted for defeat by the Republicans in the 2004 election. However, he defeated Republican Tom Ernst with 61 percent of the vote. In March 2006 Illinois's 17th congressional district's congressman, Lane Evans, announced he would be retiring at the end of his 12th term shortly after he won the nomination for a thirteenth term. Sullivan, whose district was largely coextensive with the west-central portion of the congressional district, entered the special nominating election finishing second to a longtime aide of Evans, Phil Hare. Sullivan was unopposed for reelection in 2008. In 2012, Sullivan handily defeated Adams County Clerk Randy Frese.

Senator Sullivan was Vice Chair of the Agriculture & Conservation committee and served on five other committees; Energy, Higher Education, Revenue, Transportation and Insurance. Senator Sullivan currently serves a Majority Whip.

Proving just how Republican Sullivan's district was at most levels, for his entire tenure his associated Representatives in Districts 93 and 94 were both Republicans. In Illinois, state house districts are formed by dividing senate districts in half. This gave Sullivan the distinction of being the only State Senator to have two associated Representatives from the opposite party.

On June 19, 2015, he announced that he would be retiring from the Illinois Senate at the end of his term in 2017. Underlining the Republican bent of his district, Republican Jil Tracy, who formerly represented District 93—the western portion of the Senate district—won the seat unopposed.

== Post legislative career ==
In 2017, John Sullivan was named by J. B. Pritzker the co-chair of the latter's Agriculture Transition Committee. After the transition, it was announced on December 27, 2018, that Sullivan would be the next director of the Illinois Department of Agriculture. He succeeded Ray Poe. In January 2020, John Sullivan resigned from being Secretary of the Illinois Department of Agriculture.

== Election history ==
2008 General Election Results – Illinois’s 47th Senate District
Party	Candidate	Votes	%
Democratic	John M Sullivan	77,597	100
Democratic hold			

2002 General Election Results – Illinois’s 47th Senate District
Party	Candidate	Votes	%
Democratic	John Sullivan	40,403	51.5
Republican	Laura Kent Donahue (incumbent)	38,009	48.5
Democratic gain from Republican			
