= Frank Hansford =

American baseball player (1874–1952)

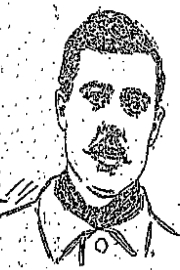
- Pitcher
- Born: December 26, 1874; DuQuoin, Illinois, US
- Died: December 14, 1952, aged 77; Fort Scott, Kansas, US
- Batted: Unknown Threw: Left

MLB debut
- June 9, 1898, for the Brooklyn Bridegrooms

Last MLB appearance
- June 9, 1898, for the Brooklyn Bridegrooms

MLB statistics
- Win–loss record: 0–0
- Earned run average: 3.86
- Strikeouts: 0
- Stats at Baseball Reference

Teams
- Brooklyn Bridegrooms (1898)

Frank Cicero Hansford (December 26, 1874 - December 14, 1952) was a professional baseball pitcher who played for the Brooklyn Bridegrooms. He appeared in one game for the Bridegrooms on June 9, 1898.
