= Capt. James Moore Farmstead =

- U.S. National Register of Historic Places
- Nearest city: Waterloo, Illinois
- Area: 0 acres (0 ha)
- Architectural style: Colonial, Brick
- NRHP reference No.: 82005204
- Added to NRHP: May 3, 1982

The Capt. James Moore Farmstead in Waterloo, Illinois represents the oldest American settlement in the Northwest Territory. It includes the Bellefontaine House, the kitchen of which is believed to be Moore's original log cabin. It was placed on the National Register of Historic Places on May 3, 1982.
