= Laura Kent Donahue =

American businesswoman and politician

Laura Kent Donahue (born April 22, 1949) was an American businesswoman and politician. She served as a Republican member of the Illinois Senate from 1981 to 2003.

Born in Quincy, Illinois, Donahue received a Bachelor of Science from Stephens College. She worked in the merchandise and bookkeeping business. Donahue also had her own business as an instructor, musical theatre consultant, choreographer. In 1981, she succeeded her late mother Mary Lou Kent in the Illinois State Senate. Donaue served as a Republican Caucus Chair, Assistant Majority Leader, Vice Chair of the Appropriations Committee and as Minority Spokesperson on the executive committee at various points during her legislative tenure.

Days after her defeat by Democrat John M. Sullivan, George Ryan appointed her to the Illinois Educational Labor Relations Board where she served for fourteen months. In 2011, she announced she was running for the position of Adams County Circuit Clerk to succeed fellow Republican Randy Frese. Kent Donahue lost to Democratic candidate Lori Geschwandner by a margin of 1,582 votes.

Kent Donahue was the Chairwoman of the Adams County Republican Party from April 14, 2017 until June 25, 2019.

On May 16, 2019, Governor J. B. Pritzker nominated Kent Donahue for a position on the Illinois State Board of Elections for a term beginning July 1, 2019 and ending June 30, 2023. The Illinois Senate confirmed Kent Donahue unanimously on May 31, 2019.
