= Frank Donnelly =

American baseball player (1869–1953)

- Pitcher
- Born: October 7, 1869; Tamaroa, Illinois, U.S.
- Died: February 3, 1953 (aged 83); Canton, Illinois, U.S.
- Batted: Unknown Threw: Unknown

MLB debut
- August 15, 1893, for the Chicago Colts

Last MLB appearance
- May 23, 1894, for the Chicago Colts

MLB statistics
- Win–loss record: 3–1
- Earned run average: 6.36
- Strikeouts: 7
- Stats at Baseball Reference

Teams
- Chicago Colts (1893–1894)

Franklin Marion Donnelly (October 7, 1869 – February 3, 1953) was an American professional baseball player. He was a right-handed pitcher for parts of two seasons (1893–94) with the Chicago Colts. For his career, he compiled a 3–1 record in 7 appearances, with a 6.36 earned run average and 7 strikeouts.

Donnelly was born in Tamaroa, Illinois and later died in Canton, Illinois at the age of 83.

== See also ==
- List of Major League Baseball annual saves leaders
