= Fountain Creek Bridge =

Historic place in Illinois, United States

- U.S. National Register of Historic Places
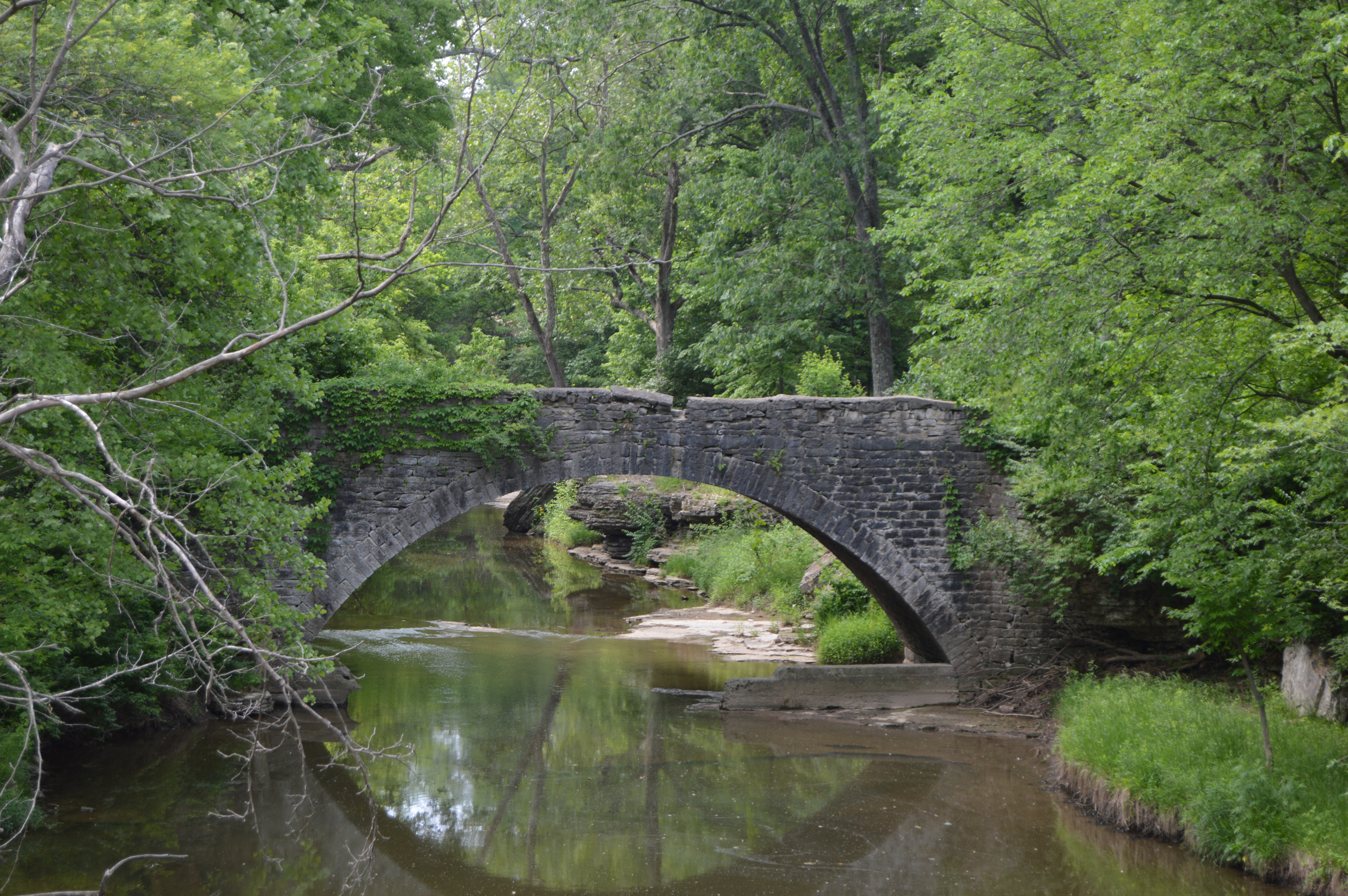
- Overview from north

- Location within Illinois Location within the United States
- Nearest city: Waterloo in Monroe County, Illinois, USA
- Coordinates: 38°19′32.69″N 90°11′44.76″W
- Built: 1849
- Architect: Garleb, Herman
- NRHP reference No.: 78001176
- Added to NRHP: December 22, 1978

Fountain Creek Bridge is a limestone arch bridge which crosses Fountain Creek near Waterloo in Monroe County, Illinois, USA. The bridge was constructed in 1849 and served as a road bridge until the 1920s, when Illinois Route 156 opened on a new bridge. During the nineteenth century, stone arch bridges were commonly built in regions with stone quarries, such as Monroe County; roughly 100 stone bridges were built in the county. The Fountain Creek Bridge is the largest remaining stone arch bridge in the county and the second-largest which was only used by road traffic in the state.

The bridge was added to the National Register of Historic Places on December 22, 1978.
