= Vickie M. Moseley =

American politician (born 1956)

Vickie M. Moseley (born March 6, 1956) is an American politician and public official.

Born in Mattoon, Illinois, Moseley received her bachelor's degree in political science from Blackburn College in Carlinville, Illinois. She lived in Springfield, Illinois with her husband and family. Moseley served in the Illinois House of Representatives from 1993 to 1995 and was a Democrat. Mosely was defeated in her 1994 reelection bid by Republican Raymond Poe; she challenged Poe for the seat again in 1998, but was again defeated. She thereafter joined the office of the Secretary of State of Illinois as assistant director for investor education.
