= Albert Bollinger =

American politician

Member of the Illinois Senate
- In office 1897–1901

Personal details
- Born: November 22, 1868 Steeleville, Illinois
- Died: February 14, 1933 (aged 63) Waterloo, Illinois
- Party: Republican

Albert Bollinger (November 22, 1868 – February 14, 1933) was an American politician, lawyer, and businessman.

== Biography ==
Bollinger was born in Steeleville, Illinois. He was admitted to the Illinois bar in 1893 and lived in Waterloo, Illinois with his wife and family. He served in the Illinois Senate from 1897 to 1901 as a Republican. Bollinger served as the master of the Monroe County Chancery Court since 1904. He also helped organized the Waterloo First National Bank. He died from heart problems at his home in Waterloo, Illinois.
