= Illinois Department of Agriculture =

State agency in Illinois, United States

Department of Agriculture
Department overview
- Jurisdiction: Illinois
- Department executive: Jerry Costello II, Director
- Website: agr.illinois.gov

The Illinois Department of Agriculture is the code department of the Illinois state government that regulates various facets of the agriculture industries of Illinois, oversees Illinois soil and water conservation, supervises the weights and measures of various commodity products, including gasoline, and supervises the Illinois State Fair. Agriculture industries that are supervised include the production of livestock, the growing of commodity crops such as corn and soybeans, and the regulation of grain elevators.

Governor Bruce Rauner accepted the resignation of Agriculture Director Phil Nelson on September 25, 2015, effective 30 days later. State Fair Director Patrick Buchen resigned the same day, telling The State Journal-Register, "I resigned because they fired (Nelson), and it's just a bunch of bull crap." Rauner appointed former State Representative Raymond Poe to the position in November of that year.

Governor J. B. Pritzker appointed Jerry Costello II as the Director of Agriculture on February 28, 2020.

== List of Directors ==
This is an incomplete list of all the people who have served as Director of the Illinois Department of Agriculture

Image	Name	Party	Term	Governor
	Thomas F. Jennings	Democratic	?-2012	Pat Quinn
	Robert Flider	Democratic	2012–2015	Pat Quinn
	Phil Nelson	Republican	2015-2015	Bruce Rauner
	Raymond Poe	Republican	2015-2018	Bruce Rauner
	John M. Sullivan	Democratic	2019-2020	JB Pritzker
	Jerry Costello II	Democratic	2020–present	JB Pritzker
