= John Linebaugh Knuppel =

American politician

John Linebaugh Knuppel (August 5, 1923 – November 15, 1986) was an American politician and Democratic member of the Illinois Senate from 1971 until 1981.

== Early life and career ==
Knuppel was born and raised in Mason County, Illinois. He was educated in the public schools at Easton, Illinois. He later attended Millikin University and Marquette University receiving his Bachelor of Philosophy from the latter. In 1949, he received a Bachelor of Laws from the University of Illinois College of Law. During World War II, he served overseas in the United States Marine Corps. As an attorney, his legal career included service as a senior member of the firm of Knuppel, Grosboll, Becker and Tice and as counsel for Lincoln Land Community College, the Menard Electric Cooperative, the Association of Illinois Electric Cooperatives and eight years an Assistant Attorney General in the Office of the Illinois Attorney General. He married Verdell Berndt and had three children. He was a resident of Virginia, Illinois.

== Illinois Senate ==
In 1970, Knuppel served as a delegate to the 1970 Illinois Constitutional Convention. That same year, Knuppel was elected to the Illinois Senate from the 42nd district. Knuppel was reelected in 1972 and 1976 from the 48th district. The 48th district included all or parts of Adams, Brown, Cass, Fulton, Mason, Peoria, and Schuyler counties in West-Central Illinois. In 1977, he supported Thomas Hynes for President of the Illinois Senate. During his tenure, he served on the Illinois Energy Resources Commission.

=== Political positions ===
Knuppel was an advocate for an unicameral legislature similar to the Nebraska Legislature. He proposed it during the Illinois Constitutional Convention of 1970 and again a decade later as a response to the Cutback Amendment. He was a supporter of the Equal Rights Amendment.

== Post-Senate career ==
Knuppel retired from the Illinois Senate in 1980 to run, unsuccessfully, for Congress in Illinois's 18th congressional district against Republican incumbent Robert H. Michel. Knuppel lost to Michel. That same year, Mary Lou Kent, a Republican member of the Illinois House, defeated Democratic candidate George Lewis, a delegate to the 1970 Illinois Constitutional Convention, for Knuppel's state senate seat. In 1982, Knuppel ran for Congress in Illinois's 20th congressional district losing the Democratic primary to Dick Durbin who would go on to defeat Republican incumbent Paul Findley. Knuppel died November 15, 1986. During the 93rd General Assembly, Vince Demuzio and Lawrence M. Walsh Sr. attempted to rename the Agriculture Building on the State Fairgrounds as the John L. Knuppel Department of Agriculture Building. The resolution did not succeed.
