= Tamaroa, Illinois =

Tamaroa
- Village
- Location of Tamaroa in Perry County, Illinois.
- Coordinates: 38°08′11″N 89°13′45″W
- Country: United States
- State: Illinois
- County: Perry

Area
  - Total: 0.96 sq mi (2.48 km^{2})
  - Land: 0.96 sq mi (2.48 km^{2})
  - Water: 0 sq mi (0.00 km^{2})
- Elevation: 505 ft (154 m)

Population (2020)
  - Total: 544
  - Density: 568.1/sq mi (219.33/km^{2})
- Time zone: UTC-6 (CST)
  - Summer (DST): UTC-5 (CDT)
- ZIP code: 62888
- Area code: 618
- FIPS code: 17-74444
- GNIS ID: 2399950

Tamaroa is a village in the Tamaroa Precinct of Perry County, Illinois, United States. As of the 2020 census, Tamaroa had a population of 544.

== History ==
The village is named after the Tamaroa, an Illiniwek people.

== Geography ==
According to the 2010 census, Tamaroa has a total area of 0.96 square miles (2.49 km^{2}), all land.

== Demographics ==
Historical population
Census	Pop.	Note	%±
1870	937		—
1900	853		—
1910	910		6.7%
1920	1,115		22.5%
1930	881		−21.0%
1940	951		7.9%
1950	849		−10.7%
1960	696		−18.0%
1970	799		14.8%
1980	885		10.8%
1990	780		−11.9%
2000	740		−5.1%
2010	638		−13.8%
2020	544		−14.7%
U.S. Decennial Census

As of the census of 2000, there were 740 people, 300 households, and 201 families residing in the village. The population density was 753.0 inhabitants per square mile (290.7/km^{2}). There were 336 housing units at an average density of 341.9 per square mile (132.0/km^{2}). The racial makeup of the village was 97.84% White, 0.14% African American, 1.08% Native American, 0.41% Asian, 0.14% from other races, and 0.41% from two or more races. Hispanic or Latino of any race were 0.54% of the population.

There were 300 households, out of which 29.0% had children under the age of 18 living with them, 50.7% were married couples living together, 10.0% had a female householder with no husband present, and 32.7% were non-families. 27.0% of all households were made up of individuals, and 14.3% had someone living alone who was 65 years of age or older. The average household size was 2.47 and the average family size was 2.94.

In the village, the population was spread out, with 23.5% under the age of 18, 10.9% from 18 to 24, 28.8% from 25 to 44, 21.2% from 45 to 64, and 15.5% who were 65 years of age or older. The median age was 37 years. For every 100 females, there were 95.8 males. For every 100 females age 18 and over, there were 93.8 males.

The median income for a household in the village was $25,682, and the median income for a family was $36,607. Males had a median income of $31,111 versus $16,944 for females. The per capita income for the village was $14,573. About 13.4% of families and 17.3% of the population were below the poverty line, including 24.4% of those under age 18 and 13.0% of those age 65 or over.

== Notable persons ==
- Roy Alden, Illinois politician and newspaper editor
- Frank Donnelly, pitcher for the Chicago Colts
- Charles Wayne Goforth, Illinois politician
- Logan H. Roots, American politician
- Logan H. Roots, (1870 - 1945) Episcopal missionary to China and Bishop of Hankow
