= WDQN (AM) =

Currently silent
- Du Quoin, Illinois; United States
- Broadcast area: Du Quoin, Illinois
- Frequency: 1580 kHz
- Branding: MeTV FM 97.1

Programming
- Language: English
- Format: Soft oldies
- Affiliations: MeTV FM; CBS News Radio

Ownership
- Owner: Du Quoin Broadcasting Company; (E&R Media LLC)

History
- First air date: 1951 (as WAVA)
- Former call signs: WAVA (1951–1953)
- Call sign meaning: Du QuoiN

Technical information
- Licensing authority: FCC
- Facility ID: 17748
- Class: D
- Power: 170 watts (daytime); 6.6 watts (nighttime)
- Translator: 97.1 W246DU (Du Quoin)

Links
- Public license information: Public file; LMS

WDQN (1580 AM, "MeTV FM 97.1") was a radio station based in Du Quoin, Illinois. It is owned by the Du Quoin Broadcasting Company and operated by E&R Media. It transmits on 1580 kHz at 170 watts daytime & 6.6 watts nighttime. WDQN went dark in June 2022.

== History ==
WDQN began as WAVA of the Ava Broadcasting Company and was based out of Ava, Illinois. The station was moved to Du Quoin in 1953 and began transmitting from north of Du Quoin in St. Johns. The station then changed its call letters to WDQN of the DuQuoin Broadcasting Company. Their first studio was in Du Quoin on the 2nd floor of the Riggio building at Main and Walnut Streets. Around 1959 they constructed their studio at the site of their tower. The station signed on with a BC-GY250 radio transmitter that was manufactured by the Gates Radio Corporation of Quincy, Illinois in 1953. WDQN operated at a power of 250 watts during the day and a power of 10 watts at night. They remained at this power even after the deregulation of broadcast powers by the FCC. This power was used until the original transmitter was replaced in 2003, where the power was then reduced to 170 watts and 6.6 watts. WDQN began simulcasting with WDQN-FM in 1969. This continued until WDQN-FM was sold to The Three Angels Broadcasting Co. of West Frankfort, Illinois in 2003–2004. The original tower was constructed to a height of about 173 feet, but was then added on to in 1988 to take the height to 311 feet. WDQN played a format of easy listening music, now referred to as adult contemporary. WDQN discontinued broadcasting on May 14, 2017. WDQN returned to the air on July 24, 2017 as a venture of E&R Media. The station continues to transmit from their location in St. Johns, but also opened a second studio on Main Street in Du Quoin in 2017.

On October 19, 2018 WDQN dropped its hot adult contemporary and began stunting with Christmas music, branded as "Christmas 97.1"(simulcast on FM translator W246DU 97.1 FM Du Quoin). On October 22, they re-branded as "Sunny 97.1 - The 90's (sic) & Now!". Shortly thereafter, the tagline was changed to "2k & Today!"

On August 28, 2020, WDQN changed their format from hot adult contemporary to soft oldies. branded as "MeTV FM 97.1".

WDQN ceased broadcasting in the summer of 2022, with management citing the inability to be profitable as the reason.

== Programming ==
For several years, WDQN was known as "Your favorite music mix" broadcasting a mix of pop and country. However, in 2008, the station began broadcasting solely as a country music station. In 2017 they returned to a full service format, with national news from FOX News Radio as well as local news updates. In the late part of March 2018, WDQN shifted its format to Hot AC and added several nationally syndicated programs, including: Uncovered with Dr. Laura Berman, The Weekly Top-20 Countdown with Rick Dees, The iHeartRadio Top-20 Countdown with Mario Lopez and Backtrax USA 90's (sic) with Kidd Kelly.

In August 2020, WDQN switched from Hot AC to soft oldies, branded as "MeTV FM 97.1" and features syndicated programs like “Rock & Roll's Greatest Hits with Dick Bartley”, The History of Rock ‘N’ Roll hosted by legendary TV game show host Wink Martindale and Into the 70’s with Todd Chambless.
