= Lusk's Ferry Road =

Early road in Illinois

Coordinates: 37.9800°N 89.5000°W

Lusk's Ferry Road was an early road in Illinois that provided an overland connection between the main settlement, Fort Kaskaskia, on the Mississippi River, and Lusk's Ferry, an important crossing point on the Ohio River. The overland route afforded an alternative to the river route, which required a difficult trip upstream on the Mississippi.

Fort Massac is on the Ohio River, about 20 miles (overland) southwest of Lusk's Ferry. This was a French fort that was abandoned and burned in 1763, at the end of the French and Indian War, when control of the Illinois Country passed to the British. It is likely that the Lusk's Ferry road started as a French road that connected Fort Massac with Fort Kaskaskia. After Lusk's Ferry came into use, a road was built from the Ferry to the Fort Massac Road. With the Fort abandoned, the southern stretch of the road fell into disuse, and the road became the Lusk's Ferry Road.

In his conquest of Illinois in 1778 and 1789, George Rogers Clark, with the army of Virginia, crossed the Ohio River from Kentucky to Fort Massac. From there he headed north to the Lusk's Ferry Road, which he followed at least part of the way to Fort Kaskaskia, whose defenses were oriented toward repelling an assault coming up the Mississippi. Clark was able to take the Fort by surprise by approaching from the interior of Illinois.

The northwestern and southeastern segments of the Lusk's Ferry Road, close to Kaskaskia and Lusk's Ferry, were accurately mapped in the early surveys of Illinois, which were conducted around 1800. This survey was oriented toward marking out "Townships" that were six miles (10 km) square, subdivided into "Sections" that were one mile (1.6 km) square, pursuant to the Land Ordinance of 1785. Although the surveyors were not charged with mapping the roads, many did so. The locations of the roads were probably exact where they met the Section lines, about once every mile, and approximated between these points. The actual maps were drawn in the 1830s, but were based on the surveyors' notes from around 1800.

The Lusk Ferry Road was a very old road, at least by Illinois standards, being present before the original survey. It is, however, notable that, on its northwestern end, this was a carefully surveyed road. It ran east out of Kaskaskia mostly in segments that ran nearly due east, almost to modern DuQuoin, where it made a sharp turn to the southeast, running for miles on a very straight line directly toward Fort Massac and Lusk's Ferry. Although the road jogged to avoid obstacles, it did not follow the natural lay of the land like animal trails, Indian trails and most pioneer roads. This was an engineered road that was not equaled in Illinois until many decades after the original survey. This suggests that the road had its origin as a military road connecting Fort Kaskaskia with Fort Massac. The road may have been laid out by the French in the 1750s, or by the Americans after the reoccupation of Fort Massac in 1794.

The direction of the road was controlled by several factors. Out of Kaskaskia, the road went north toward the headwaters of Marys River, avoiding a river crossing. The road then headed east to cross the Big Muddy River as far upstream as possible consistent with a direct route to the southeast. After crossing the Big Muddy, the road seems to aim straight for the most direct pass over the Shawnee Hills.

The Big Muddy crossing was a major limitation on this road. Although bridges over the Big Muddy existed in the area in the early 19th century, there is no reference to a bridge on the Lusk's Ferry Road. Even if there was a bridge, the Big Muddy is notable for its broad, flat floodplain. A true all weather route would have required long causeways over the floodplain that would have been more than a mile long.

In wet weather, there were two options. One would be to go down the Mississippi and up the Ohio by boat. The other would have been to follow the Fort Vincennes road northeast to the Goshen Road, and then southeast to Old Shawneetown, Illinois. Although this would have been at least eighty miles farther, there were no river crossings.

== Randolph County ==
The original surveys of Illinois show several roads in Randolph County, consistent with its role as the original State Capital and economic center of the State. Towards the eastern edge of the County (Township 6 South, Range 5 West), one of these roads is clearly labeled as the Lusk's Ferry Road. This road crosses Mary's River, just to the north of modern County road 1400N. The road seems to join modern Illinois Route 150 through Steeleville. At the east edge of Steeleville, the old road veered south from Route 150, heading straight for modern Illinois Route 4 at the county line.

- TopoQuest Steeleville

== Perry County ==
The Lusk Ferry Road entered Perry County, in T6S, R4W, on modern Route 4. Rather than follow that road south, however, the old road headed almost due east across the Township to what was once the village of Denmark. There the road jogged a mile south, along the eastern boundary of T6S, R3W, and again headed due east, crossing Beaucoup Creek, just north of its fork with Gallum Creek. The road exited to T6S, R2W just north of the Pinckneyville/DuQuoin Airport. From there the road jogged back a mile north, and headed due east toward Duquoin. Although this township became a moonscape of strip mines, there is an east/west road through the spoil piles that seems to line up exactly with the old road.

Just west of DuQuoin, the Lusk Ferry Road turned toward the southeast, near the point where it entered T6S, R1W, running about six miles (10 km) toward Jackson County and the Big Muddy River. Somewhere close to the Big Muddy, Chief DuQuoin met his defeat at the hands of the Shawnee.

- Google Maps, Denmark
- TopoQuest DuQuoin

== Jackson County ==
The Lusk Ferry Road cut through the northeast corner of Jackson County in T7S, R1W. The road entered the County about 3.5 miles (5.6 km) west of the corner, heading southeast. It crossed the Little Muddy River, and exited the County about 3 miles (4.8 km) south of the northeast corner.

- TopoQuest, NW Corner, Jackson County

== Franklin County ==
The Lusk Ferry Road cut through the southwest corner of Franklin County, heading southeast. It entered the County about four miles (6 km) north of the corner, passing through Royalton, before exiting the county about four miles (6 km) east of the corner.

Although it is not shown on the original survey maps, there must have been a road that crossed or branched off of the Lusk Ferry Road in Franklin County. In 1814, John James Audubon attempted to cross Illinois by horse, on his way to Henderson, Kentucky. Audubon lost his horse crossing the Big Muddy near modern Plumfield, and nearly lost his life soon thereafter. This suggests an east/west road roughly following modern Illinois Route 149. This road would have led to Frank's Fort and Jordan's Fort, which were built around 1811, in response to Tecumseh's War.

- TopoQuest Little Muddy NW of Royalton
- TopoQuest Royalton to Big Muddy to Herrin

== Williamson County ==
The Lusk's Ferry Road entered Williamson County, in T8S, R1E, about four miles (6 km) east of the northwest corner of the County, heading southeast, straight toward modern Herrin. The road followed modern Illinois Route 148, but was about a mile south. This area was heavily strip mined, raising the possibility that Route 148 once followed the old road, but was moved a mile north to avoid the mines.

The road turned south, running straight though modern downtown Herrin, T8S, R2E, along the route of modern Route 148. South of Herrin, the road entered T9S, R2E. The Lusk's Ferry Road is clearly marked as such where it entered this Township. The road then enters a maze of "Traces", none of which are clearly marked as the Lusk Ferry Road.

About five miles (8 km) south of Herrin there was once a town called "Bainbridge". All that is now left is the Bainbridge cemetery, about five miles (8 km) southwest of Marion. This was located in what is now the Crab Orchard National Wildlife Refuge. Some sources describe this as an important early cross roads in this area, near the base of the Shawnee Hills. Beyond Bainbridge, the Lusk's Ferry Road is not marked on the old maps through the rest of Williamson County.

There were two routes over the hills to the south, neither of which is clearly marked on the original survey maps. The western route crossed the Shawnee Hills at "Buffalo Gap", near Goreville. The eastern crossed the Shawnee Hills at "Mocassin Gap". While the Buffalo Gap route had the lower summit, the Mocassin Gap was the more direct route.

There is a line of disconnected diagonal road segments leading from Marion to Creal Springs, a small village in southeastern Williamson County. A modern road runs south out of Creal Springs toward Lake of Egypt. This is the most likely route for the Lusk's Ferry Road.

- TopoQuest Herrin to Bainbridge
- TopoQuest Creal Springs to Wagon Creek

== Mocassin Gap/Johnson County ==
The road from Creal Springs enters Johnson County a little to the east of Lake of Egypt. There it turns southeast, running up the Shawnee Hills alongside Wagon Creek.

On the original survey plats, a short segment of the Lusk's Ferry Road is labeled in Section 19, T11S, R4E. This segment lines up with the Wagon Creek Road, and is pointed toward modern Reynoldsburg, three miles (5 km) southeast, which some sources cite as having been on the road. (The road is not, however, shown on the map at the location of Reynoldsburg.) The Shawnee summit is between the mapped segment and Reynoldsburg, so this area was probably once called Mocassin Gap. Modern U.S. Route 45 crosses this area, but perpendicular to the apparent route of the old road.

The short, mapped segment of the road between Wagon Creek and Reynoldsburg shows the road going down a steep grade to Sugar Creek. A high ridge lies between Sugar Creek and Reynoldsburg. From the top of the ridge, a modern road runs down to Mocassin Gap and Reynoldsburg. This is probably the route of the old road: except for the missing Sugar Creek crossing, there would be a modern road all the way from Creal Springs to Reynoldsburg.

Crossing the Sugar Creek valley and the ensuing ridge was probably very difficult. Having reached the ridge overlooking Sugar Creek, it would have been far easier to go southwest toward Tunnel Hill, circling around the watershed back east toward Reynoldsburg. A line of modern roads follows this route. Alternatively, it would have been much simpler to have gone in a zig zag from Creal Springs to New Burnside, through the gap along modern U.S. Route 45, and then back east to Reynoldsburg. The original route may be hard to spot in this area because it was abandoned early on for the simpler routes followed by the modern roads.

- TopoQuest, Sugar Creek

== Pope County ==
The original survey shows the Lusk's Ferry Road entering Pope County near the modern village of Robbs. From there, the road followed the modern County/Forest Service road through Glendale and Rising Sun, down to Illinois Route 146. The road then followed Route 146 into Golconda and Lusk's Ferry.

- TopoQuest Reynoldsburg to Robbs & Glendale, Illinois
- TopoQuest Robbs & Glendale to Rising Sun, Illinois
- TopoQuest Rising Sun to Golconda, Illinois

== See also ==
- Ford's Ferry Road
