= Roy Alden =

American politician and newspaper editor

Royal Penny Alden (July 22, 1863 – August 7, 1937) was an American politician and newspaper editor.

Alden was born in Tamaroa, Illinois and went to public schools. He lived in Pinckneyville, Illinois and was the editor of the Pickneyville Democrat newspaper. Alden served in the Illinois Senate from 1901 to 1907. He was a Democrat. He also worked as a cashier in the First National Bank. Alden died at his home in Pinckneyville from a long illness.
