= Raymond Poe =

American politician

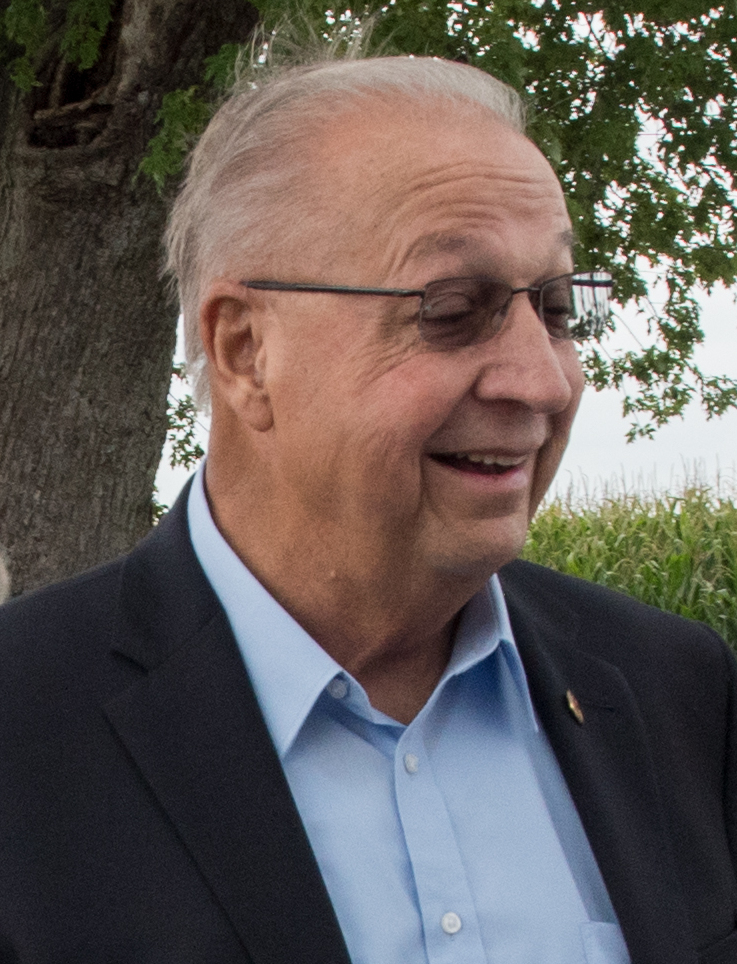
- Poe in 2017

Member of the Illinois House of Representatives from the 99th district
- In office January 11, 1995 – November 15, 2015
- Preceded by: Vickie Moseley
- Succeeded by: Sara Wojcicki Jimenez

Personal details
- Born: March 26, 1944 (age 82) Lincoln, Illinois
- Party: Republican
- Spouse: Carol
- Children: Lance Poe
- Education: DeVry University
- Profession: Farmer; Politician

Raymond Poe (born March 26, 1944) is an American politician and former Republican member of the Illinois House of Representatives.

== Early life and career ==
Raymond Poe was born March 26, 1944, in Lincoln, Illinois. In 1963, he graduated from DeVry University. He and his wife Carol had three children. Poe served on the Williamsville School Board from 1970 to 1991. Poe served for a time as the president of the Sangamon County Farm Bureau and on the board of directors for the Lincolnland FS Inc., an agricultural cooperative. In 1990, Poe served on the Advisory Council on Business/Education Partnerships, an advisory council created to assist the Illinois State Board of Education in aligning educational efforts with the needs of the business community.

== Illinois House of Representatives ==
In the 1994 election, Poe defeated Democratic incumbent Vickie Moseley in the 99th district.

Raymond Poe was the first person to announce his candidacy for Lieutenant Governor of Illinois in the 2006 Republican primary. However, Poe was unable to break out of the crowded field or pair himself with a gubernatorial candidate and opted to run for reelection as state representative from the 99th district.

In 2013, Tom Cross stepped down as House Minority Leader to run for the Republican nomination for Illinois Treasurer in the 2014 election. Poe campaigned for the leadership position within the Republican caucus, but conceded to Jim Durkin prior to the caucus vote.

Poe resigned from the Illinois House on November 15, 2015. Local Republican leaders appointed Sara Wojcicki Jimenez. Wojcicki Jimenez was sworn into office on November 20, 2021.

== Post-legislative career ==
On December 4, 2015, Governor Bruce Rauner nominated Poe to serve as the Director of the Illinois Department of Agriculture. Poe was confirmed by the Illinois Senate unanimously. Poe replaced Philip Nelson, a former president of the Illinois Farm Bureau, who resigned after less than one year in the Rauner administration. After Rauner lost his reelection campaign to J. B. Pritzker, Poe opted to retire on December 31, 2018.
