= Charles Wayne Goforth =

American law enforcement officer and politician (1931–2018)

Charles Wayne Goforth (October 22, 1931 – March 16, 2018) was an American law enforcement officer and politician.

Born in Tamaroa, Illinois, Goforth served in the United States Navy during the Korean War. He went to the Illinois State Police Academy and then served with the Illinois State Police. He lived in Nashville, Illinois. From 1985 to 1991, Goforth served in the Illinois House of Representatives and was a Republican. After his service in the Illinois House of Representatives, Goforth switched his party affiliation and joined the Democratic Party. In 2002, Goforth ran for the Illinois State Senate and lost the election. Goforth died at his home in Tamaroa, Illinois.
