= DuQuoin Community Unit School District 300 =

School district in Perry County, Illinois, United States

Address
- 845 East Jackson Street Du Quoin, Illinois, 62832; United States

District information
- Type: Public
- Grades: PreK–12
- NCES District ID: 1712760

Students and staff
- Students: 1,393

Other information
- Website: www.duquoinschools.org

DuQuoin Community Unit School District 300 is a school district headquartered in DuQuoin, Illinois. In addition it serves St. Johns and Sunfield. The district's area is 105.14 square miles (272.3 km^{2}).

== Schools ==
- DuQuoin High School
- DuQuoin Middle School
- DuQuoin Elementary School

Built in 1999, the K-8 school building has 120,000 square feet (11,000 m^{2}) of space.
