= Mary Lou Kent =

American businesswoman and politician

Mary Lou Kent (October 3, 1921 – March 9, 1981) was an American businesswoman and politician.

Born in Quincy, Illinois, Kent went to the University of Colorado and Michigan State University. She worked as an administrative assistant for the Quincy Chamber of Commerce. In 1973, Kent served in the Illinois House of Representatives as a Republican. In the 1980 general election, Kent defeated Democratic candidate George Lewis, a delegate to the 1970 Illinois Constitutional Convention, for the seat in the Illinois Senate being vacated by John Linebaugh Knuppel's run for the United States House of Representatives. She died of a heart attack while in a car in an Quincy shopping mall in Quincy, Illinois. Her daughter Laura Kent Donahue succeeded her mother in the Illinois Senate.
