= Du Bois, Illinois =

Du Bois
- Village
- Location of Du Bois in Washington County, Illinois.
- Coordinates: 38°13′17″N 89°12′46″W
- Country: United States
- State: Illinois
- County: Washington

Area
  - Total: 1.05 sq mi (2.73 km^{2})
  - Land: 1.05 sq mi (2.73 km^{2})
  - Water: 0 sq mi (0.00 km^{2})
- Elevation: 515 ft (157 m)

Population (2020)
  - Total: 175
  - Density: 166/sq mi (64.2/km^{2})
- Time zone: UTC-6 (CST)
  - Summer (DST): UTC-5 (CDT)
- ZIP code: 62831
- Area code: 618
- FIPS code: 17-20890
- GNIS ID: 2398750

Du Bois is a village in Washington County, Illinois, United States. As of the 2020 census, Du Bois had a population of 175.

== History ==
Du Bois was originally named Coloma. In 1869, the village was renamed for Jesse K. Du Bois, state auditor of public accounts, 1856–1864. An early variant name was "Bois".

== Geography ==
According to the 2010 census, Du Bois has a total area of 1.07 square miles (2.77 km^{2}), all land.

== Demographics ==
Historical population
Census	Pop.	Note	%±
1880	274		—
1890	304		10.9%
1900	335		10.2%
1910	351		4.8%
1920	443		26.2%
1930	197		−55.5%
1940	280		42.1%
1950	282		0.7%
1960	229		−18.8%
1970	234		2.2%
1980	241		3.0%
1990	216		−10.4%
2000	222		2.8%
2010	205		−7.7%
2020	175		−14.6%
U.S. Decennial Census

As of the census of 2000, there were 222 people, 96 households, and 54 families residing in the village. The population density was 207.8 inhabitants per square mile (80.2/km^{2}). There were 116 housing units at an average density of 108.6 per square mile (41.9/km^{2}). The racial makeup of the village was 97.30% White, 0.45% Native American, 0.45% from other races, and 1.80% from two or more races. Hispanic or Latino of any race were 2.25% of the population.

There were 96 households, out of which 30.2% had children under the age of 18 living with them, 42.7% were married couples living together, 8.3% had a female householder with no husband present, and 43.8% were non-families. 38.5% of all households were made up of individuals, and 22.9% had someone living alone who was 65 years of age or older. The average household size was 2.31 and the average family size was 3.13.

In the village, the population was spread out, with 30.2% under the age of 18, 7.2% from 18 to 24, 31.1% from 25 to 44, 17.6% from 45 to 64, and 14.0% who were 65 years of age or older. The median age was 35 years. For every 100 females, there were 115.5 males. For every 100 females age 18 and over, there were 93.8 males.

The median income for a household in the village was $30,417, and the median income for a family was $32,500. Males had a median income of $28,750 versus $16,250 for females. The per capita income for the village was $12,367. About 17.3% of families and 15.7% of the population were below the poverty line, including 15.7% of those under the age of eighteen and 27.8% of those 65 or over.
