= Hecker, Illinois =

- Village
- Etymology: Friedrich Franz Karl Hecker
- Location in Monroe County, Illinois
- Coordinates: 38°18′18″N 89°59′37″W
- Country: United States
- State: Illinois
- County: Monroe
- Precinct: 1
- Founded: 1895

Area
  - Total: 0.25 sq mi (0.66 km^{2})
  - Land: 0.25 sq mi (0.65 km^{2})
  - Water: 0.0039 sq mi (0.01 km^{2})
- Elevation: 472 ft (144 m)

Population (2020)
  - Total: 429
  - Density: 1,698/sq mi (655.6/km^{2})
- Time zone: UTC-6 (CST)
  - Summer (DST): UTC-5 (CDT)
- ZIP code: 62248
- Area code: 618
- FIPS code: 17-33877
- GNIS feature ID: 2398483
- Website: hecker.illinois.gov

Hecker is a village in Monroe County and St. Clair County in the U.S. state of Illinois. The population was 429 at the 2020 census,

== History ==
Hecker was originally named "Freedom". The town was laid out on land of Theodore Hilgard. It was platted and surveyed by Thomas Singleton, county surveyor, December 18, 1840, the first home being built in 1849. In 1895 the citizens of what was then Freedom decided to incorporate, to facilitate improvements to the nascent town's infrastructure. Due to complaints from the Post Office, there being another town calling itself Freedom in Illinois, they were forced to change the name. Friedrich Franz Karl Hecker, a former German revolutionary, orator, and American Civil War colonel, whose farm was near Summerfield in adjacent St. Clair County, was known to and well respected by the town's inhabitants, and they decided to honor him by naming the town after him.

== Geography ==
Hecker is in eastern Monroe County, with its northern border following the St. Clair County line. Illinois Route 159 passes through the village on Main Street, leading north 15 miles (24 km) to Belleville and south 6 miles (10 km) to Red Bud. Illinois Route 156 enters the village on West Monroe Street and departs to the north with IL 159; it leads west 9 miles (14 km) to Waterloo, the Monroe county seat, and east 8 miles (13 km) to New Athens.

According to the U.S. Census Bureau, the village of Hecker has a total area of 0.27 square miles (0.70 km^{2}), of which 0.003 square miles (0.008 km^{2}), or 1.11%, are water. The village drains east to a tributary of Richland Creek and west toward Toole Branch, a tributary of Prairie du Long Creek, which itself is a tributary of Richland Creek. The entire village is part of the Kaskaskia River watershed.

== Demographics ==
Historical population
Census	Pop.	Note	%±
1900	200		—
1910	187		−6.5%
1920	159		−15.0%
1930	177		11.3%
1940	205		15.8%
1950	204		−0.5%
1960	313		53.4%
1970	380		21.4%
1980	531		39.7%
1990	534		0.6%
2000	475		−11.0%
2010	481		1.3%
2020	429		−10.8%
U.S. Decennial Census

As of the census of 2000, there were 475 people, 188 households, and 134 families residing in the village. The population density was 1,993.8 inhabitants per square mile (769.8/km^{2}). There were 201 housing units at an average density of 843.7 per square mile (325.8/km^{2}). The racial makeup of the village was 99.16% White, 0.21% African American, and 0.63% from two or more races. Hispanic or Latino of any race were 0.63% of the population.

There were 188 households, out of which 31.9% had children under the age of 18 living with them, 60.1% were married couples living together, 9.6% had a female householder with no husband present, and 28.2% were non-families. 23.4% of all households were made up of individuals, and 10.1% had someone living alone who was 65 years of age or older. The average household size was 2.53 and the average family size was 3.02.

In the village, the population was spread out, with 22.3% under the age of 18, 9.7% from 18 to 24, 31.2% from 25 to 44, 23.6% from 45 to 64, and 13.3% who were 65 years of age or older. The median age was 36 years. For every 100 females there were 106.5 males. For every 100 females age 18 and over, there were 100.5 males.

The median income for a household in the village was $43,333, and the median income for a family was $51,071. Males had a median income of $38,125 versus $21,447 for females. The per capita income for the village was $18,423. About 2.8% of families and 4.7% of the population were below the poverty line, including 10.1% of those under age 18 and none of those age 65 or over.
