= Peterstown House =

- U.S. National Register of Historic Places
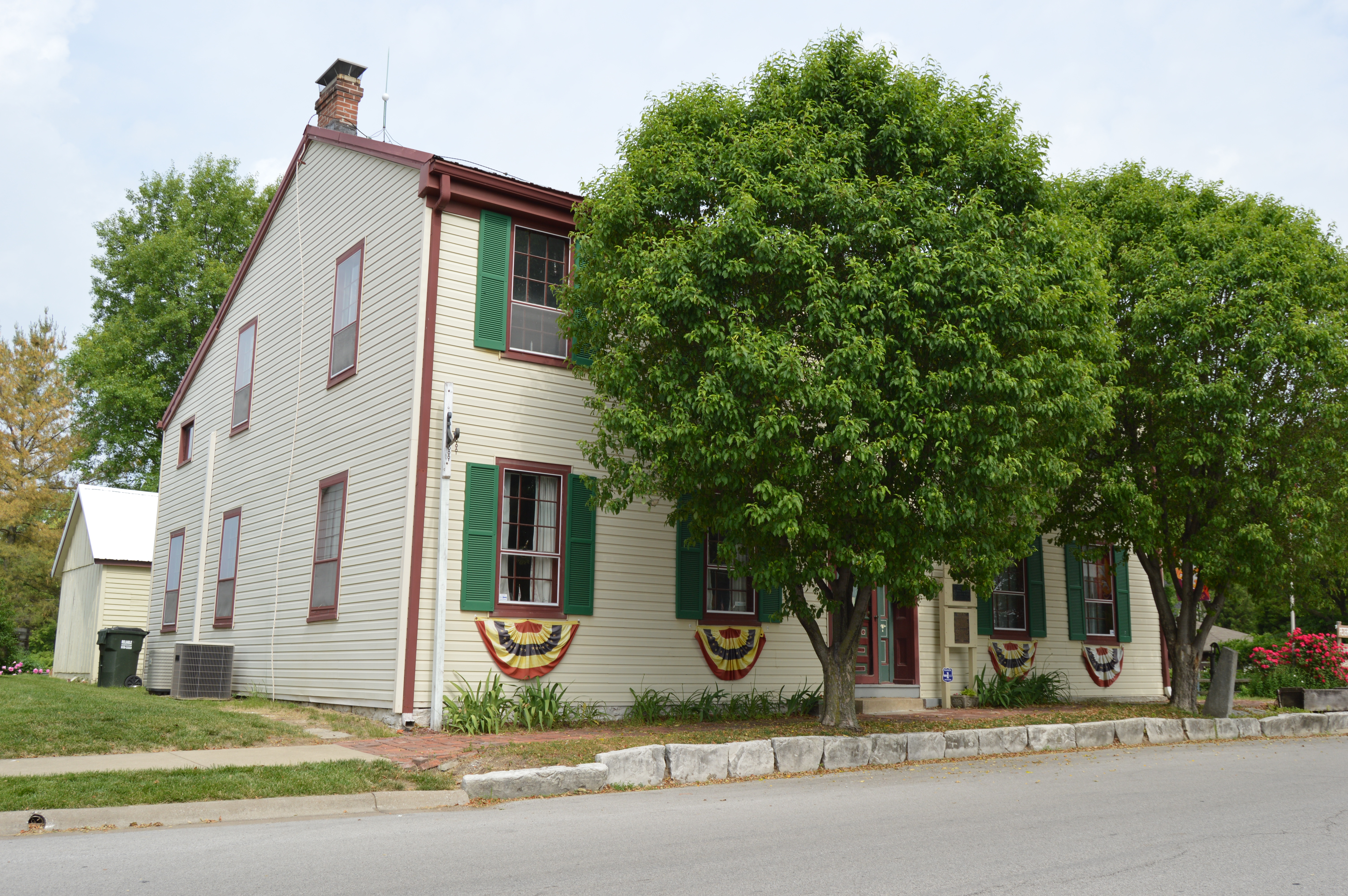
- Front and southern side

- Location within Illinois Location within the United States
- Location: 275 N. Main St., Waterloo, IL, USA
- Coordinates: 38°20′31″N 90°09′03″W
- Built: 1830
- Architectural style: Colonial, Saltbox
- NRHP reference No.: 77000489
- Added to NRHP: Nov 16, 1977

The Peterstown House is a house in Waterloo, Illinois. The saltbox building was constructed in the mid-1830s; an addition was placed on its north side around the 1860s. Emory Peter Rogers, for whom the house and surrounding neighborhood were named, was its first owner.

The house was later an inn and stagecoach stop along the Kaskaskia-Cahokia Trail, the first road in Illinois, which connected the French settlements at Kaskaskia and Cahokia.

In the late 19th century, the Peterstown House became a social hall. It was listed on the National Register of Historic Places on November 16, 1977.
