= Gundlach-Grosse House =

Historic house in Illinois, United States

- U.S. National Register of Historic Places
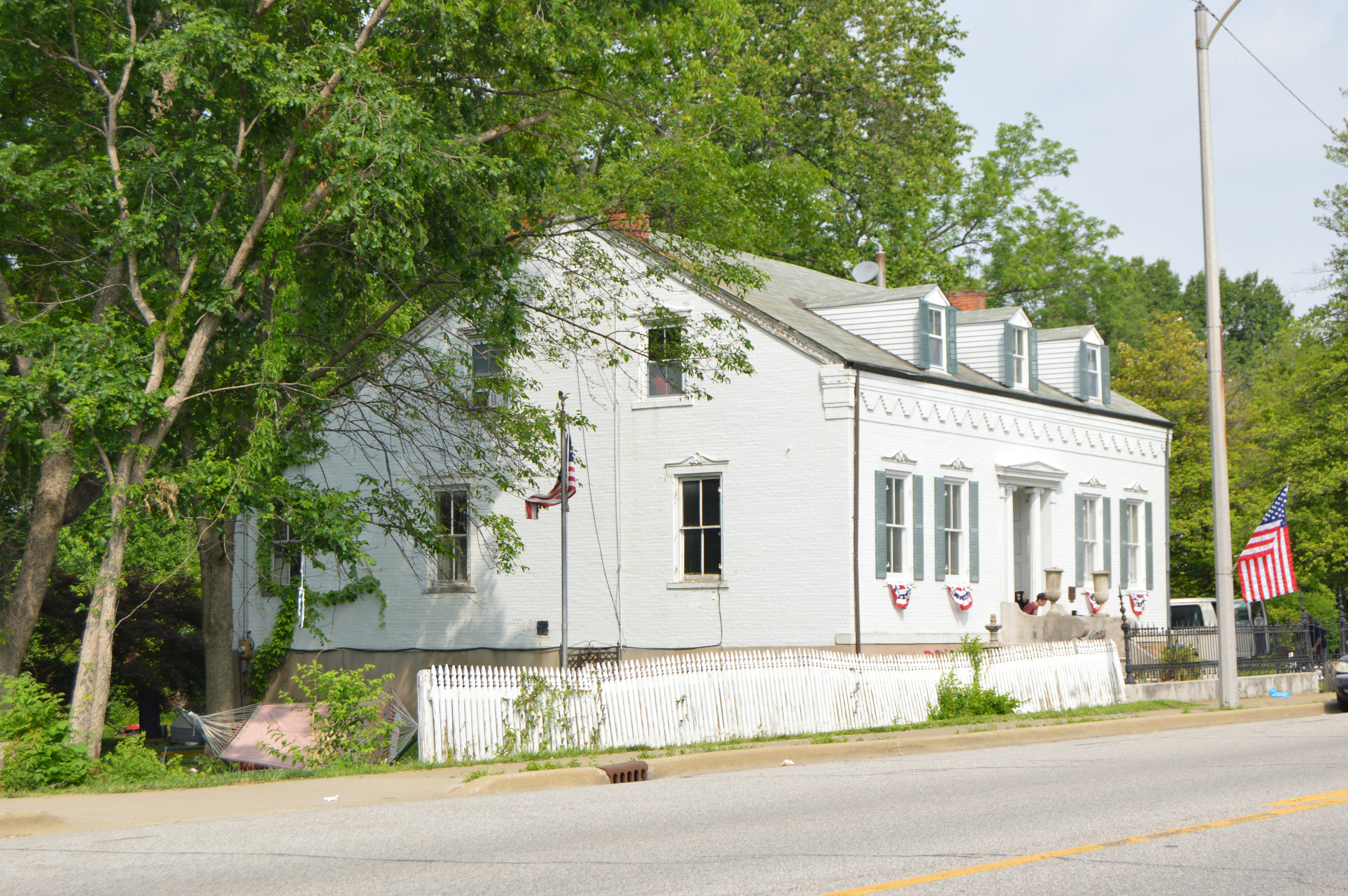
- Front and southern side

- Location within Illinois Location within the United States
- Location: 625 N. Main St., Columbia, Illinois
- Coordinates: 38°26′53″N 90°12′18″W
- Area: less than one acre
- Built: 1857
- Architectural style: Greek Revival
- NRHP reference No.: 78001173
- Added to NRHP: December 18, 1978

The Gundlach-Grosse House is a historic house located at 625 N. Main St. in Columbia, Illinois, United States. The Greek Revival house was built in 1857 for German immigrants John and Philip Peter Gundlach. The brothers ran a local brewery which remained in their family for four generations, and John Gundlach served as Columbia's mayor for four years. The house is a 1 ½-story brick building; its corbeled brick frieze is representative of the decorative brickwork commonly designed by German immigrant builders. The entrance to the house features a classical pediment supported by Ionic columns and cast iron pilasters. Two windows with broken scroll pedimented lintels are situated on each side of the door. The house's gable roof features three gabled dormers on the front and back sides.

The house was added to the National Register of Historic Places on December 18, 1978.
