= St. Johns, Illinois =

St. Johns
- Village
- Location of St. Johns in Perry County, Illinois.
- Coordinates: 38°02′02″N 89°14′24″W
- Country: United States
- State: Illinois
- County: Perry

Area
  - Total: 0.76 sq mi (1.98 km^{2})
  - Land: 0.73 sq mi (1.88 km^{2})
  - Water: 0.039 sq mi (0.10 km^{2})
- Elevation: 463 ft (141 m)

Population (2020)
  - Total: 163
  - Density: 224.7/sq mi (86.76/km^{2})
- Time zone: UTC-6 (CST)
  - Summer (DST): UTC-5 (CDT)
- ZIP code: 62832
- Area code: 618
- FIPS code: 17-66924
- GNIS ID: 2399165

St. Johns (Saint Johns) is a village in Perry County, Illinois, United States. As of the 2020 census, St. Johns had a population of 163.

The village was named in 1856 after St. John's Day.

== Geography ==
According to the 2010 census, St. Johns has a total area of 0.767 square miles (1.99 km^{2}), of which 0.73 square miles (1.89 km^{2}) (or 95.18%) is land and 0.037 square miles (0.10 km^{2}) (or 4.82%) is water.

Although St Johns is an established village, people who reside in St Johns have a Du Quoin street address.

== Demographics ==
Historical population
Census	Pop.	Note	%±
1870	356		—
1880	495		39.0%
1910	370		—
1920	353		−4.6%
1930	297		−15.9%
1940	314		5.7%
1950	275		−12.4%
1960	206		−25.1%
1970	220		6.8%
1980	284		29.1%
1990	262		−7.7%
2000	218		−16.8%
2010	219		0.5%
2020	163		−25.6%
U.S. Decennial Census

As of the census of 2000, there were 218 people, 96 households, and 62 families residing in the village. The population density was 310.0 inhabitants per square mile (119.7/km^{2}). There were 106 housing units at an average density of 150.7 per square mile (58.2/km^{2}). The racial makeup of the village was 92.66% White, 2.75% African American, 0.92% Asian, 0.46% from other races, and 3.21% from two or more races. Hispanic or Latino of any race were 0.46% of the population.

There were 96 households, out of which 29.2% had children under the age of 18 living with them, 47.9% were married couples living together, 10.4% had a female householder with no husband present, and 35.4% were non-families. 30.2% of all households were made up of individuals, and 9.4% had someone living alone who was 65 years of age or older. The average household size was 2.27 and the average family size was 2.79.

In the village, the population was spread out, with 21.6% under the age of 18, 9.2% from 18 to 24, 29.4% from 25 to 44, 30.3% from 45 to 64, and 9.6% who were 65 years of age or older. The median age was 40 years. For every 100 females, there were 118.0 males. For every 100 females age 18 and over, there were 111.1 males.

The median income for a household in the village was $35,455, and the median income for a family was $43,750. Males had a median income of $32,083 versus $14,167 for females. The per capita income for the village was $15,802. About 9.4% of families and 11.4% of the population were below the poverty line, including 7.9% of those under the age of eighteen and none of those 65 or over.
