= Waterloo Historic District (Illinois) =

Historic district in Illinois, United States

- U.S. National Register of Historic Places
- U.S. Historic district
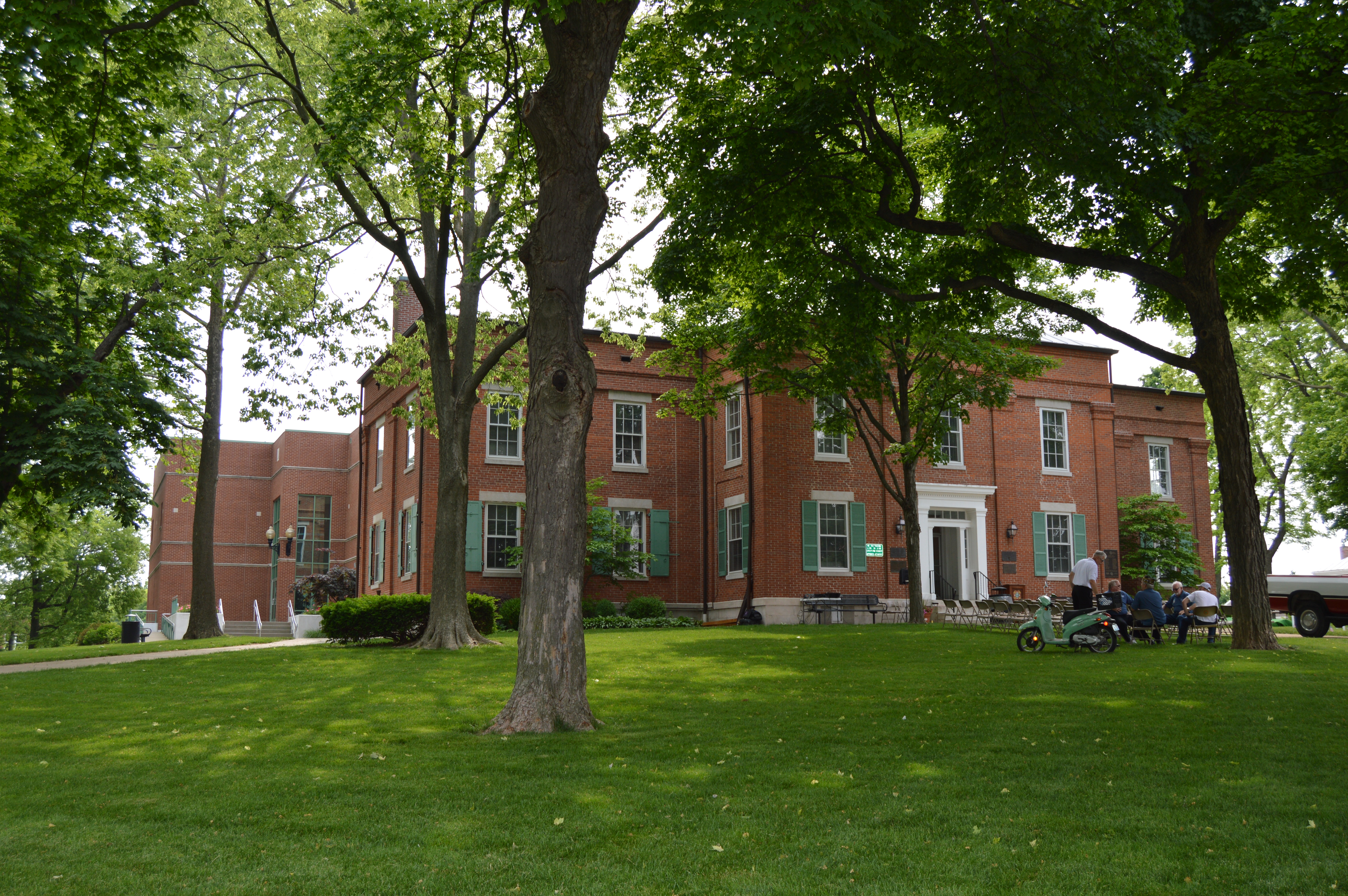
- Monroe County Courthouse

- Location within Illinois Location within the United States
- Location: Most of the central portion of Waterloo, Illinois, roughly bounded by Morrison, Moore, Konigsmark & Hickory/Oak/Elm
- Coordinates: 38°20′07″N 90°09′10″W
- Area: 77 acres (31 ha)
- Built: 1836
- Architectural style: Italianate
- NRHP reference No.: 78001177
- Added to NRHP: December 1, 1978

The Waterloo Historic District is a historic district composed of the majority of central Waterloo, Illinois. The district includes 271 buildings, of which 182 are contributing buildings to its historic character. The center of the district includes Waterloo's town square, the site of the Monroe County Courthouse, as well as a two-block section of Main Street which forms the city's commercial core. The town square is surrounded by residential development on three sides, an unusual arrangement among small towns in Illinois. The predominant architectural styles in the residential parts of the district are local adaptations of the Federal style and a German cottage style developed by the city's German immigrants in the 19th century.

The district was placed on the National Register of Historic Places on December 1, 1978.
