= Steeleville, Illinois =

Steeleville
- Village
- Location of Steeleville in Randolph County, Illinois.
- Coordinates: 38°00′18″N 89°39′48″W
- Country: United States
- State: Illinois
- County: Randolph

Area
  - Total: 1.53 sq mi (3.97 km^{2})
  - Land: 1.53 sq mi (3.95 km^{2})
  - Water: 0.0077 sq mi (0.02 km^{2})
- Elevation: 423 ft (129 m)

Population (2020)
  - Total: 1,930
  - Density: 1,266.9/sq mi (489.17/km^{2})
- Time zone: UTC-6 (CST)
  - Summer (DST): UTC-5 (CDT)
- ZIP code: 62288
- Area code: 618
- FIPS code: 17-72468
- GNIS feature ID: 2399891
- Website: steeleville.org

Steeleville is a village in Randolph County, Illinois, United States. As of the 2020 census, Steeleville had a population of 1,930.

== History ==
Steeleville had the names Alma, Georgetown and Steele's Mill before obtaining its present name. The area near Steeleville was first settled by John Steele in 1807. In 1810 George Steele (John's son) settled in what came to be known as Georgetown. In 1812 a fort was built for protection against the Indians. In 1825 Steele's Mill was erected. Col. Gabriel Jones had a store. In 1827 the Post Office opened under the name Steele's Mill. It was not until 1832 that lots were sold in the town by Capt. Rogers, Col. Jones, Dr. Jones, Robert Jones and Tanner Briggs. The Baptist church was organized in 1838 by Rev J B Alcott.

In the early 19th century, the Lusk's Ferry Road ran through what is now Steeleville. This important, early road connected Fort Kaskaskia with Lusk's Ferry on the Ohio River. The road headed northeast out of Kaskaskia toward what is now Steeleville to make its crossing of Mary's River, before heading east and southeast toward Lusk's Ferry.

== Geography ==
According to the 2010 census, Steeleville has a total area of 1.528 square miles (3.96 km^{2}), of which 1.52 square miles (3.94 km^{2}) (or 99.48%) is land and 0.008 square miles (0.02 km^{2}) (or 0.52%) is water. Steeleville is located adjacent to Mary's River, a direct tributary of the Mississippi River.

== Demographics ==
Historical population
Census	Pop.	Note	%±
1880	490		—
1890	401		−18.2%
1900	562		40.1%
1910	708		26.0%
1920	702		−0.8%
1930	909		29.5%
1940	1,212		33.3%
1950	1,353		11.6%
1960	1,569		16.0%
1970	1,957		24.7%
1980	2,240		14.5%
1990	2,059		−8.1%
2000	2,077		0.9%
2010	2,083		0.3%
2020	1,930		−7.3%
U.S. Decennial Census

=== 2020 census ===
As of the 2020 census, Steeleville had a population of 1,930. The median age was 41.9 years. 23.6% of residents were under the age of 18 and 22.2% of residents were 65 years of age or older. For every 100 females there were 88.5 males, and for every 100 females age 18 and over there were 85.8 males age 18 and over.

0.0% of residents lived in urban areas, while 100.0% lived in rural areas.

There were 850 households in Steeleville, of which 30.2% had children under the age of 18 living in them. Of all households, 47.3% were married-couple households, 16.0% were households with a male householder and no spouse or partner present, and 30.0% were households with a female householder and no spouse or partner present. About 31.9% of all households were made up of individuals and 18.9% had someone living alone who was 65 years of age or older.

There were 965 housing units, of which 11.9% were vacant. The homeowner vacancy rate was 3.9% and the rental vacancy rate was 7.4%.

Racial composition as of the 2020 census
Race	Number	Percent
White	1,804	93.5%
Black or African American	13	0.7%
American Indian and Alaska Native	9	0.5%
Asian	14	0.7%
Native Hawaiian and Other Pacific Islander	0	0.0%
Some other race	15	0.8%
Two or more races	75	3.9%
Hispanic or Latino (of any race)	30	1.6%

=== 2000 census ===
As of the census of 2000, there were 2,077 people, 905 households, and 581 families residing in the village. The population density was 1,593.0 inhabitants per square mile (615.1/km^{2}). There were 967 housing units at an average density of 741.7 units per square mile (286.4 units/km^{2}). The racial makeup of the village was 98.84% White, 0.14% Native American, 0.43% Asian, 0.24% from other races, and 0.34% from two or more races. Hispanic or Latino of any race were 0.67% of the population.

There were 905 households, out of which 27.6% had children under the age of 18 living with them, 52.4% were married couples living together, 8.5% had a female householder with no husband present, and 35.7% were non-families. 31.9% of all households were made up of individuals, and 18.8% had someone living alone who was 65 years of age or older. The average household size was 2.30 and the average family size was 2.89.

In the village, the population was spread out, with 23.1% under the age of 18, 6.7% from 18 to 24, 27.3% from 25 to 44, 22.6% from 45 to 64, and 20.3% who were 65 years of age or older. The median age was 40 years. For every 100 females, there were 86.6 males. For every 100 females age 18 and over, there were 85.6 males.

The median income for a household in the village was $34,679, and the median income for a family was $45,909. Males had a median income of $36,094 versus $25,000 for females. The per capita income for the village was $19,124. About 5.7% of families and 7.9% of the population were below the poverty line, including 14.6% of those under age 18 and 2.2% of those age 65 or over.

== Education ==
=== Steeleville High School ===
Steeleville High School is located at 701 South Sparta Street. Its mascot is the Warrior. As of 2023, the Principal and assistant superintendent was Jennifer Haertling. The school offers many sports: for the boys, basketball, baseball, bowling, football, golf, track, cross-country, and trap shooting; and for the girls, basketball, softball, bowling, golf, cheerleading, volleyball, track, cross-country and trap shooting. There are many clubs available, including the Art Society, Annual Yearbook Committee, Future Business Leaders of America, Fellowship of Christian Athletes, History, Industrial Arts, Life Savers, Math League, National Honor Society, Science, Student Activity Board, and Varsity Club.

=== Steeleville Grade School ===
Steeleville Grade School is located at 609 South Sparta Street. Its mascot is the Brave. As of 2020, the Principal and District Superintendent was Dr. Stephanie Mulholland. The school has grades from pre-k to 8th. It offers sports for boys including baseball, basketball, and cross-country. And for the girls, there is softball, basketball, volleyball, cheerleading, and cross-country.

=== St. Mark's Lutheran School ===
St. Mark's is a parochial school located at 504 N. James Street. Its mascot is the Panther. The school offers pre-school (3 to 4 year old) through fifth-grade education.

== Government ==
The police department and fire department are located within the Village Hall building at 107 West Broadway. As of 2021, the Mayor is Andy Gerlach, the Police Chief is James Zeidler, and the Fire Chief is Richard Reitz.

== Notable people ==
- Albert Bollinger, Illinois state senator, businessman, and lawyer
- Herb Hall, pitcher with the Detroit Tigers
- William George Juergens, United States District Court judge
- Nathan Reitz, Illinois state representative
