= Lusk's Ferry, Illinois =

Coordinates: 37°22′00″N 88°28′58″W

- Former site of Lusk's Ferry, in Golconda, Illinois in 1927
- Locale: Golconda, Pope County, Illinois or across the Ohio River in Livingston County, Kentucky
- Waterway: Ohio River
- Transit type: Passenger/wagon ferry
- Operator: James and Sarah Lusk
- Began operation: 1797
- Ended operation: 1957
- No. of terminals: 2

Lusk's Ferry was a place where pioneers crossed the Ohio River from Kentucky into Illinois. Some sources say that Golconda, Illinois was once called "Lusk's Ferry". Others say that the name properly refers to the place across the river, in Livingston County, Kentucky.

Lusk's Ferry was a terminus of the Lusk's Ferry Road, an early overland route connecting the Ohio River with Fort Kaskaskia. In his conquest of Illinois in 1778, George Rogers Clark crossed the Ohio River at Fort Massac. He then marched north a short distance to the Lusk's Ferry Road, and from there to Fort Kaskaskia.

In 1798, Major James Lusk moved the ferry across the river to Illinois. The major died while building a road into the interior of Illinois. His widow, Sarah, then took over the ferry business. The town on the Illinois side became known as "Sarahville" by 1816. The name was changed to Golconda in 1817.

In 1817, the Western Gazetteer listed two places to cross the Ohio River and make the overland journey to the Territorial Capital at Kaskaskia, Illinois. The shortest overland journey was from Lusk's Ferry.

From 1838 to 1839, thousands of Cherokee were forced to cross the Ohio at Lusk's Ferry on the Trail of Tears.

Lusk Creek joins the Ohio River at Golconda. The creek flows through a deep canyon which is crossed by few roads. It is the site of the Lusk Creek Wilderness Area.

== See also ==
- Cave-In-Rock Ferry, from Illinois to Kentucky
- Ford's Ferry, from Kentucky to Illinois
- Lusk's Ferry Road
- List of crossings of the Ohio River
