= Du Quoin, Illinois =

Du Quoin
- City
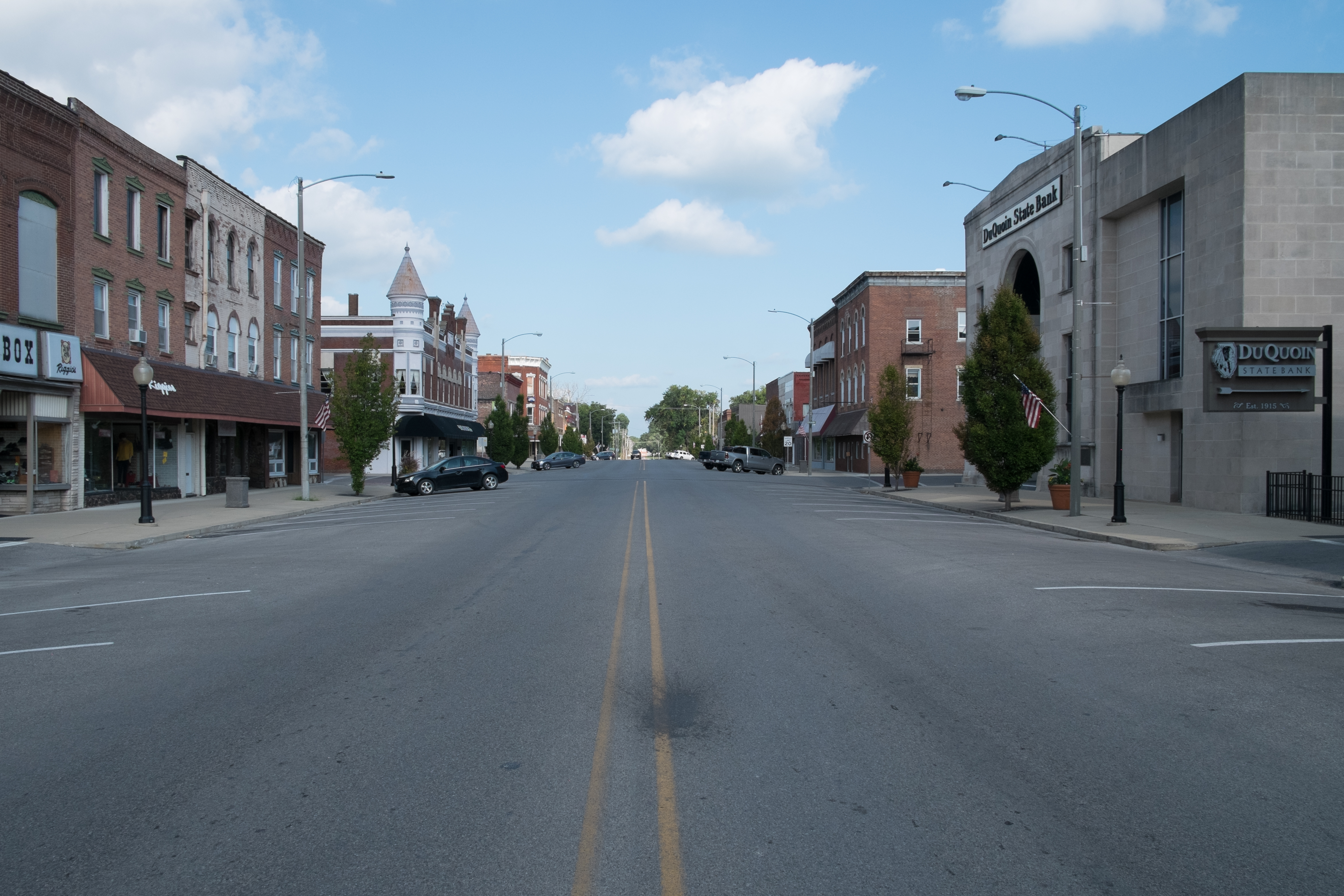
- Du Quoin in September 2019
- Motto: "In the heart of southern Illinois"
- Location of Du Quoin in Perry County, Illinois.
- Coordinates: 38°00′17″N 89°14′12″W
- Country: United States
- State: Illinois
- County: Perry

Government
  - Type: Mayor-Council
  - Body: City Commission

Area
  - Total: 7.06 sq mi (18.29 km^{2})
  - Land: 6.98 sq mi (18.07 km^{2})
  - Water: 0.081 sq mi (0.21 km^{2})
- Elevation: 449 ft (137 m)

Population (2020)
  - Total: 5,827
  - Density: 835.0/sq mi (322.38/km^{2})
- Time zone: UTC−6 (CST)
  - Summer (DST): UTC−5 (CDT)
- ZIP code: 62832
- Area code: 618
- FIPS code: 17-21267
- GNIS ID: 2394564
- Website: duquoinil.gov

Du Quoin (/duːˈkɔɪn/ doo-KOYN) is a city in Perry County, Illinois, United States. Its name reflects an alternate spelling of the surname of Jean Baptiste de Coigne, a chief of the Tamaroa and later Kaskaskia indigenous people of the area during the American Revolutionary War and early statehood. As of the 2020 census, Du Quoin had a population of 5,827. It is best known for hosting the annual DuQuoin State Fair and the Street Machine Nationals.

== History ==
The area east of Du Quoin is known as Old Du Quoin. In the early 19th century, Du Quoin was near the Lusk's Ferry Road, an important early road that connected Kaskaskia with Lusk's Ferry on the Ohio River. The road ran easterly out of Steeleville to a point southwest of Du Quoin. There it turned to the southeast to cross the Big Muddy River and head for Lusk's Ferry.

Du Quoin had its start at its present location in 1853 when the railroad was extended to that point. The city was named after Chief Jean Baptiste Ducoigne of the Kaskaskia, an Illiniwek people, who were defeated by the Shawnee near here in 1802.

The first mayor of Du Quoin was George Spencer Smith.

== Geography ==
The city of Du Quoin is located in the southeastern portion of Perry County, Illinois.

According to the 2010 census, Du Quoin has a total area of 7.061 square miles (18.29 km^{2}), of which 6.98 square miles (18.08 km^{2}) (or 98.85%) is land and 0.081 square miles (0.21 km^{2}) (or 1.15%) is water.

=== Climate ===
Climate data for Du Quoin, Illinois (1991–2020 normals, extremes 1895–present)
Month	Jan	Feb	Mar	Apr	May	Jun	Jul	Aug	Sep	Oct	Nov	Dec	Year
Record high °F (°C)	76 (24)	79 (26)	92 (33)	92 (33)	97 (36)	106 (41)	113 (45)	113 (45)	108 (42)	96 (36)	85 (29)	76 (24)	113 (45)
Mean daily maximum °F (°C)	40.4 (4.7)	45.7 (7.6)	55.9 (13.3)	67.5 (19.7)	76.1 (24.5)	84.4 (29.1)	87.2 (30.7)	86.4 (30.2)	80.0 (26.7)	69.0 (20.6)	55.0 (12.8)	44.4 (6.9)	66.0 (18.9)
Daily mean °F (°C)	32.1 (0.1)	36.7 (2.6)	46.0 (7.8)	56.8 (13.8)	66.1 (18.9)	74.3 (23.5)	77.4 (25.2)	75.7 (24.3)	68.3 (20.2)	57.5 (14.2)	45.2 (7.3)	36.2 (2.3)	56.0 (13.3)
Mean daily minimum °F (°C)	23.9 (−4.5)	27.7 (−2.4)	36.1 (2.3)	46.1 (7.8)	56.1 (13.4)	64.3 (17.9)	67.6 (19.8)	64.9 (18.3)	56.6 (13.7)	46.0 (7.8)	35.5 (1.9)	28.0 (−2.2)	46.1 (7.8)
Record low °F (°C)	−22 (−30)	−21 (−29)	−10 (−23)	20 (−7)	29 (−2)	39 (4)	47 (8)	43 (6)	27 (−3)	20 (−7)	−4 (−20)	−15 (−26)	−22 (−30)
Average precipitation inches (mm)	3.16 (80)	2.90 (74)	4.39 (112)	5.35 (136)	5.51 (140)	4.79 (122)	3.94 (100)	3.30 (84)	3.40 (86)	3.66 (93)	4.07 (103)	3.24 (82)	47.71 (1,212)
Average snowfall inches (cm)	3.8 (9.7)	3.2 (8.1)	0.7 (1.8)	0.1 (0.25)	0.0 (0.0)	0.0 (0.0)	0.0 (0.0)	0.0 (0.0)	0.0 (0.0)	0.2 (0.51)	0.3 (0.76)	3.6 (9.1)	11.9 (30)
Average precipitation days (≥ 0.01 in)	7.9	7.4	9.6	10.0	10.7	8.6	7.4	7.2	6.4	7.4	8.1	7.8	98.5
Average snowy days (≥ 0.1 in)	2.0	1.8	0.4	0.0	0.0	0.0	0.0	0.0	0.0	0.2	0.2	1.4	6.0
Source: NOAA

== Media ==
Du Quoin is served by a weekly newspaper, the Weekly-Press. Du Quoin is also served by radio stations WDQN AM 1580/FM 97.1 and WDQN-FM 95.9 FM. A former daily newspaper, the Du Quoin Call, was published from 1895 until 2022.

== Transportation ==
=== Rail transportation ===
Amtrak, the national passenger rail system, provides service to Du Quoin. Amtrak Train 391, the southbound Saluki, is scheduled to depart Du Quoin at 1:17 pm daily with service to Carbondale. Amtrak Train 393, the southbound Illini, is scheduled to depart Du Quoin at 9:07 pm daily serving the same point as the southbound Saluki. Amtrak Train 390, the northbound Saluki, is scheduled to depart Du Quoin at 7:51 am daily with service to Centralia, Effingham, Mattoon, Champaign-Urbana, Rantoul, Gilman, Kankakee, Homewood, and Chicago. Amtrak Train 392, the northbound Illini, is scheduled to depart Du Quoin at 4:36 pm daily serving the same points as the northbound Saluki.

=== Bus service ===
Public transit service in Du Quoin is provided by South Central Transit.

== Demographics ==
Historical population
Census	Pop.	Note	%±
1880	2,807		—
1890	4,052		44.4%
1900	4,353		7.4%
1910	5,454		25.3%
1920	7,285		33.6%
1930	7,593		4.2%
1940	7,515		−1.0%
1950	7,147		−4.9%
1960	6,558		−8.2%
1970	6,691		2.0%
1980	6,594		−1.4%
1990	6,697		1.6%
2000	6,448		−3.7%
2010	6,109		−5.3%
2020	5,827		−4.6%
U.S. Decennial Census

=== 2020 census ===
As of the 2020 census, Du Quoin had a population of 5,827. The median age was 41.7 years. 22.2% of residents were under the age of 18 and 21.5% of residents were 65 years of age or older. For every 100 females there were 93.1 males, and for every 100 females age 18 and over there were 89.8 males age 18 and over.

92.1% of residents lived in urban areas, while 7.9% lived in rural areas.

There were 2,428 households in Du Quoin, of which 28.1% had children under the age of 18 living in them. Of all households, 39.0% were married-couple households, 20.1% were households with a male householder and no spouse or partner present, and 33.7% were households with a female householder and no spouse or partner present. About 35.4% of all households were made up of individuals and 16.7% had someone living alone who was 65 years of age or older.

There were 2,861 housing units, of which 15.1% were vacant. The homeowner vacancy rate was 2.5% and the rental vacancy rate was 14.7%.

Racial composition as of the 2020 census
Race	Number	Percent
White	5,043	86.5%
Black or African American	344	5.9%
American Indian and Alaska Native	19	0.3%
Asian	60	1.0%
Native Hawaiian and Other Pacific Islander	1	0.0%
Some other race	65	1.1%
Two or more races	295	5.1%
Hispanic or Latino (of any race)	174	3.0%

=== 2000 census ===
As of the census of 2000, there were 6,448 people, 2,716 households, and 1,648 families residing in the city. The population density was 939.3 inhabitants per square mile (362.7/km^{2}). There were 2,988 housing units at an average density of 435.3 per square mile (168.1/km^{2}). The racial makeup of the city was 90.23% White, 7.23% African American, 0.36% Native American, 0.34% Asian, 0.05% Pacific Islander, 0.36% from other races, and 1.44% from two or more races. Hispanic or Latino of any race were 1.32% of the population.

There were 2,716 households, out of which 28.0% had children under the age of 18 living with them, 45.0% were married couples living together, 12.4% had a female householder with no husband present, and 39.3% were non-families. 35.6% of all households were made up of individuals, and 19.9% had someone living alone who was 65 years of age or older. The average household size was 2.26 and the average family size was 2.92.

In the city, the population was spread out, with 23.5% under the age of 18, 10.2% from 18 to 24, 24.9% from 25 to 44, 20.7% from 45 to 64, and 20.8% who were 65 years of age or older. The median age was 39 years. For every 100 females, there were 89.4 males. For every 100 females age 18 and over, there were 84.8 males.

The median income for a household in the city was $29,124, and the median income for a family was $37,688. Males had a median income of $33,576 versus $18,958 for females. The per capita income for the city was $14,883. About 13.3% of families and 18.1% of the population were below the poverty line, including 22.6% of those under age 18 and 12.1% of those age 65 or over.

== Medical care ==
Du Quoin is home to Marshall Browning Hospital, a 25-bed critical access facility, and two nursing homes. The nearest ICU is 25 miles away, at Memorial Hospital of Carbondale.

== Education ==
Du Quoin belongs in DuQuoin Community Unit School District 300 and is composed of: Du Quoin Elementary School, Du Quoin Middle School, and Du Quoin High School. The Elementary and Middle School are in adjoining buildings that share some common areas.

== Events ==
The DuQuoin State Fair is held in late August and early September since 1923. The DuQuoin State Fairgrounds Racetrack has hosted different types of racing. It hosted a AAA National Championship race from 1948 to 1955, and a USAC National Championship race from 1955 to 1970. It currently hosts a USAC Silver Crown Series race and a ARCA Menards Series race. From 1957 to 1980, Du Quoin was home to the Hambletonian Stakes, one of the most famous events in harness racing, and one of three races comprising the Triple Crown of Harness Racing for Trotters. Du Quoin now is best known for Street Machines Nationals and the Du Quoin State Fair.

== Nature and Parks ==
Du Quoin is known for the large amount of Canada Geese that migrate for winter and to nest in Spring. Clutches between 3-8 goslings are common in April and May.

== Notable people ==
- Terry Deering, Illinois legislator; born in Du Quoin
- Ralph A. Dunn, businessman and Illinois state legislator
- Edward Murray East, plant geneticist, born in Du Quoin
- Ruby Berkley Goodwin, writer and actress, born in Du Quoin
- Frank Hansford, pitcher for the Brooklyn Bridegrooms; born in Du Quoin
- Gerald Hawkins, Illinois legislator; born in Du Quoin
- Billie Hayes, actress; born in Du Quoin
- Nick Hill, football quarterback and head coach; born in Du Quoin
- Les Hite, musician and bandleader; born in Du Quoin
- John Iffert, Roman Catholic Bishop of the Diocese of Covington.
- Judy Jordan, National Book Critics Circle Award winning writer; lives in Du Quoin
- Bhavesh Patel, theatre and television actor; lived in Du Quoin
- Tyler Reddick, NASCAR Cup Series driver; lived in Du Quoin
- Charles Schlueter, retired musician (Trumpet)
- Don Stanhouse, pitcher with various teams; born in Du Quoin
- Ken Swofford, actor; born in Du Quoin
- Rudolf Wanderone, billiards player known as "Minnesota Fats"; lived in Du Quoin
