= Dan Reitz =

American politician

Member of the Illinois House of Representatives from the 116th district
- In office July 1997 – June 25, 2011
- Preceded by: Terry Deering
- Succeeded by: Jerry Costello II

Personal details
- Born: March 16, 1954 (age 72) Red Bud, Illinois
- Party: Democratic
- Spouse: Joyce
- Profession: Educator

Dan Reitz (born 1954) is an American politician and former Democratic member of the Illinois House of Representatives, representing the 116th District from his July 23, 1997 appointment until he stepped down in May 2011. Jerry Costello II was appointed to serve the remainder of Reitz's term.

Prior to his service in the Illinois House, he was a member of the Randolph County Board. He was succeeded by Jerry Costello.
