= Illinois Route 156 =

State highway in southwestern Illinois, US

Illinois Route 156
- IL 156 highlighted in red

Route information
- Maintained by IDOT
- Length: 22.95 mi (36.93 km)
- Existed: 1926–present

Major junctions
- West end: South Meyer Avenue / C Road in Valmeyer
- East end: IL 13 in New Athens

Location
- Country: United States
- State: Illinois
- Counties: Monroe, St. Clair

Highway system
- Illinois State Highway System; Interstate; US; State; Tollways; Scenic
← IL 155	→ IL 157

Illinois Route 156 is an east–west state road in southwestern Illinois. It runs from South Meyer Avenue & C Road in Valmeyer to just west of New Athens. This is a distance of 22.95 miles (36.93 km).

== Route description ==
Illinois 156 runs through rural southwestern Illinois. It is the main east–west state road through Waterloo. Illinois 156 overlaps Illinois Route 159 from Hecker north for a short distance, when 156 leaves 159 and turns back toward its eastern terminus.

== History ==
SBI Route 156 is the same as Illinois 156 is now. There have been no changes since 1926.

== Major Intersections ==
County	Location	mi	km	Destinations	Notes
Monroe	Valmeyer	0.0	0.0	S Meyer Avenue / C Road	
Monroe	Waterloo	7.0	11.3	IL 3 – Wartburg, Maeystown	
Monroe	Hecker	16.8	27.0	IL 159 south	West end of IL 159 concurrency
St. Clair		18.1	29.1	IL 159 north – Belleville	East end of IL 159 concurrency
St. Clair		22.95	36.93	IL 13 – Belleville, New Athens	
1.000 mi = 1.609 km; 1.000 km = 0.621 mi: Concurrency terminus
