= Valmeyer, Illinois =

- Village
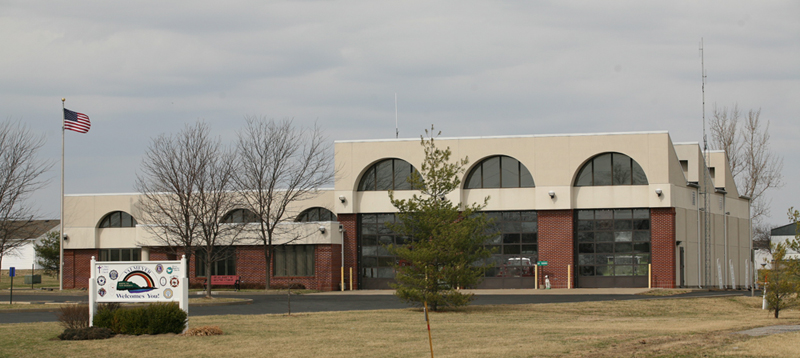
- Valmeyer City Hall and Emergency Services

- Location in Monroe County, Illinois
- Coordinates: 38°18′23″N 90°17′51″W
- Country: United States
- State: Illinois
- County: Monroe

Area
  - Total: 3.51 sq mi (9.08 km^{2})
  - Land: 3.45 sq mi (8.93 km^{2})
  - Water: 0.054 sq mi (0.14 km^{2})
- Elevation: 646 ft (197 m)

Population (2020)
  - Total: 1,233
  - Density: 357.5/sq mi (138.04/km^{2})
- Time zone: UTC-6 (CST)
  - Summer (DST): UTC-5 (CDT)
- ZIP code: 62295
- Area code: 618
- FIPS code: 17-77265
- GNIS feature ID: 2400041
- Website: www.valmeyerillinois.com

Valmeyer is a village in Monroe County, Illinois, United States. The population was 1,233 at the 2020 census. It was originally located in the American Bottom floodplain of the Mississippi River, but now occupies higher land to the east.

== History ==
After the Great Flood of 1993 the residents of Valmeyer decided to relocate the town 2 miles (3 km) to the east, on land that is more than 300 feet (91 m) higher than the floodplain. The town was rebuilt with financial assistance from the Federal Emergency Management Agency. The old townsite has been described as a ghost town with few inhabitants but still an important traffic artery. Valmeyer's successful relocation is seen as a potential model for other localities retreating from sea level rise.

A documentary about Valmeyer's 1993 flood fight and subsequent rebuilding titled "Valmeyer, IL: The Documentary" was released in 2015.

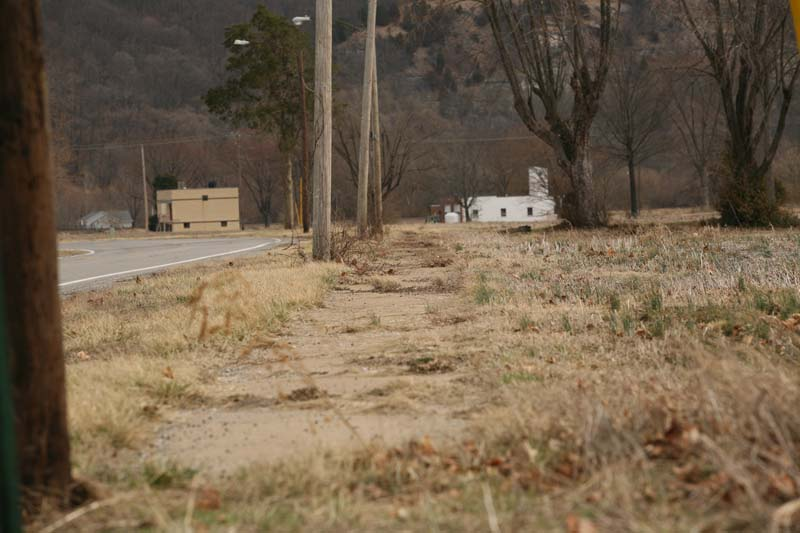
The remains of the business district in Old Valmeyer has been reduced to a few broken sidewalks and empty space.

== Geography ==
Valmeyer is located in western Monroe County. Illinois Route 156 runs along the southern edge of the new village and passes through the center of the old village. IL 156 leads east 7 miles (11 km) to Waterloo, the county seat, and west 5 miles (8 km) to its terminus at Harrisonville, 1 mile (1.6 km) east of the Mississippi River.

According to the U.S. Census Bureau, Valmeyer has a total area of 3.45 square miles (8.9 km^{2}), of which 3.42 square miles (8.9 km^{2}) are land and 0.054 square miles (0.14 km^{2}), or 1.56%, are water.

== Demographics ==
Historical population
Census	Pop.	Note	%±
1920	406		—
1930	528		30.0%
1940	591		11.9%
1950	656		11.0%
1960	709		8.1%
1970	733		3.4%
1980	898		22.5%
1990	897		−0.1%
2000	608		−32.2%
2010	1,263		107.7%
2020	1,233		−2.4%

=== 2020 census ===
As of the 2020 census, Valmeyer had a population of 1,233. The median age was 38.3 years. 24.4% of residents were under the age of 18 and 15.4% of residents were 65 years of age or older. For every 100 females there were 96.3 males, and for every 100 females age 18 and over there were 90.6 males age 18 and over.

0.0% of residents lived in urban areas, while 100.0% lived in rural areas.

There were 456 households in Valmeyer, of which 40.8% had children under the age of 18 living in them. Of all households, 64.5% were married-couple households, 11.0% were households with a male householder and no spouse or partner present, and 21.1% were households with a female householder and no spouse or partner present. About 21.0% of all households were made up of individuals and 12.3% had someone living alone who was 65 years of age or older.

There were 479 housing units, of which 4.8% were vacant. The homeowner vacancy rate was 0.3% and the rental vacancy rate was 2.3%.

Racial composition as of the 2020 census
Race	Number	Percent
White	1,175	95.3%
Black or African American	2	0.2%
American Indian and Alaska Native	2	0.2%
Asian	5	0.4%
Native Hawaiian and Other Pacific Islander	0	0.0%
Some other race	5	0.4%
Two or more races	44	3.6%
Hispanic or Latino (of any race)	25	2.0%

=== 2000 census ===
As of the census of 2000, there were 608 people, 222 households, and 166 families residing in the village. The population density was 182.7 inhabitants per square mile (70.5/km^{2}). There were 241 housing units at an average density of 72.4 per square mile (28.0/km^{2}). The racial makeup of the village was 98.68% White, 0.33% African American, 0.33% Asian, 0.16% Pacific Islander, and 0.49% from two or more races. Hispanic or Latino of any race were 0.82% of the population.

There were 222 households, out of which 39.2% had children under the age of 18 living with them, 64.0% were married couples living together, 9.9% had a female householder with no husband present, and 25.2% were non-families. 24.8% of all households were made up of individuals, and 14.9% had someone living alone who was 65 years of age or older. The average household size was 2.74 and the average family size was 3.29.

In the village, the age distribution of the population shows 27.8% under the age of 18, 10.0% from 18 to 24, 28.1% from 25 to 44, 21.1% from 45 to 64, and 13.0% who were 65 years of age or older. The median age was 36 years. For every 100 females there were 87.1 males. For every 100 females age 18 and over, there were 79.9 males.

The median income for a household in the village was US$53,214 (equivalent to $99,487 in 2025), and the median income for a family was $58,646 (equivalent to $109,643 in 2025). Males had a median income of $38,500 versus $26,838 for females. The per capita income for the village was $20,420 (equivalent to $38,177 in 2025). None of the families and 3.0% of the population were living below the poverty threshold, including no under eighteens and 10.2% of those over 64.
