= Waterloo, Illinois =

- City
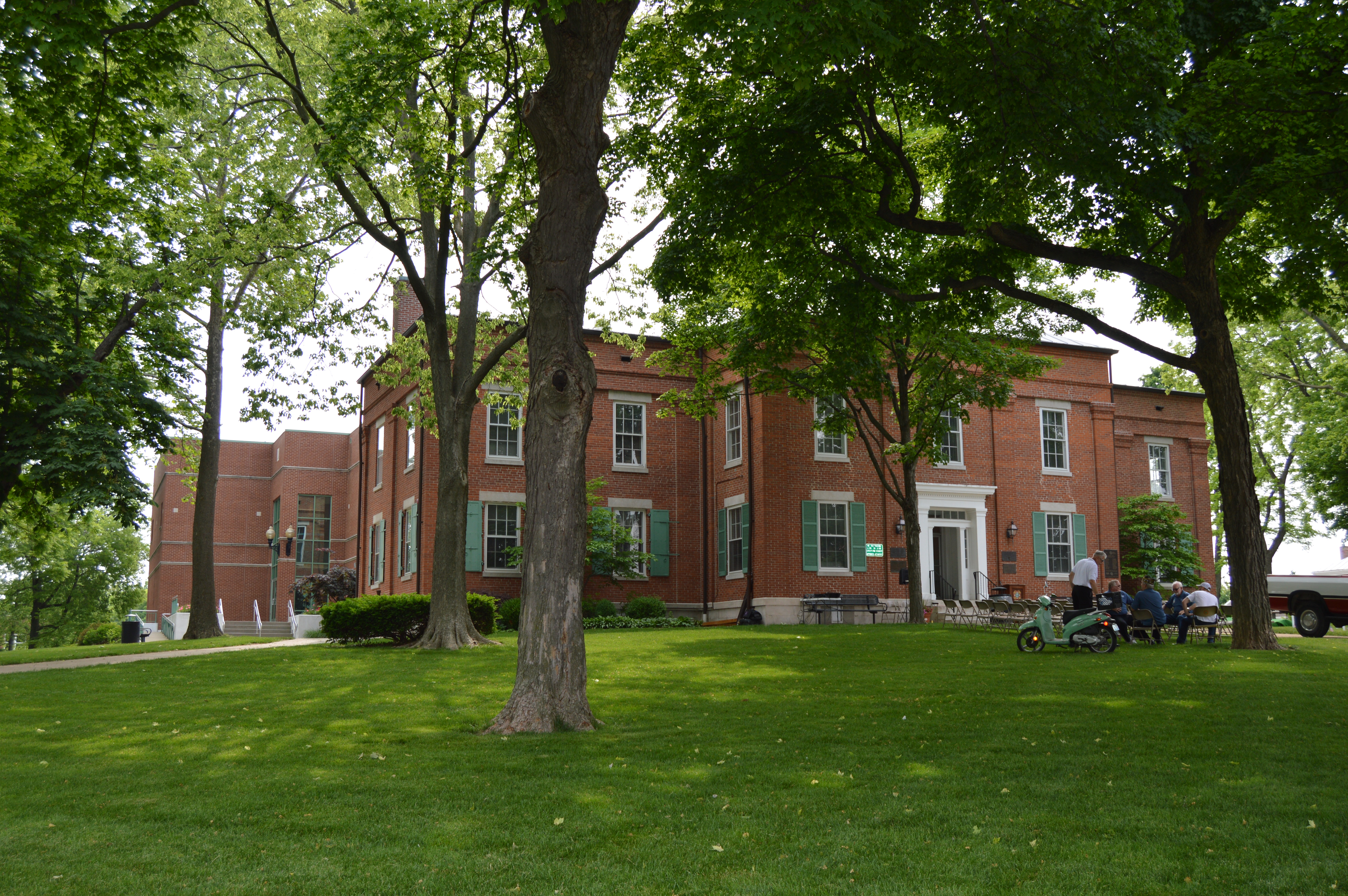
- Monroe County Courthouse in the Waterloo Historic District

- Flag Logo
- Etymology: Battle of Waterloo
- Motto: "City Conveniences, Rural Advantages"
- Interactive map of Waterloo, Illinois
- Location within Illinois Location within the United States
- Coordinates: 38°21′17″N 90°09′10″W
- Country: United States
- State: Illinois
- County: Monroe
- Precincts: 16, 17, 18, 19, 26, and 27
- Founded: 1818
- Chartered as town: 1849
- Incorporation: 1889

Area
  - Total: 8.31 sq mi (21.53 km^{2})
  - Land: 8.18 sq mi (21.19 km^{2})
  - Water: 0.14 sq mi (0.35 km^{2})
- Elevation: 686 ft (209 m)

Population (2020)
  - Total: 11,013
  - Density: 1,352.0/sq mi (522.02/km^{2})
- Time zone: UTC-6 (CST)
  - Summer (DST): UTC-5 (CDT)
- ZIP code: 62298
- Area code: 618
- FIPS code: 17-79150
- GNIS feature ID: 2397210
- Website: www.waterloo.il.us

Waterloo is a city in and county seat of Monroe County, Illinois, United States. The population was 11,013 at the 2020 census, up from 9,811 in 2010.

== Geography ==
Waterloo is located northeast of the center of Monroe County. Illinois Route 3 passes through the west side of the city, bypassing the downtown; it leads north 8 miles (13 km) to Columbia and southeast 13 miles (21 km) to Red Bud. Downtown St. Louis is 24 miles (39 km) to the north. Illinois Route 156 passes through the city on Park Street, South Church Street, West 4th Street, South Market Street, and Front Street, leading 9 miles (14 km) to Hecker and west 7 miles (11 km) to Valmeyer.

According to the U.S. Census Bureau, Waterloo has a total area of 8.31 square miles (21.52 km^{2}), of which 8.18 square miles (21.19 km^{2}) are land and 0.13 square miles (0.34 km^{2}), or 1.61%, are water. The city sits on a ridge that drains east to tributaries of Prairie du Long Creek and west to tributaries of Fountain Creek. Prairie du Long Creek is a southeast-flowing tributary of the Kaskaskia River, while Fountain Creek is a west-flowing direct tributary of the Mississippi River. Waterloo is along the historic trail that went from Kaskaskia to St. Louis.

== Climate ==
The climate in this area is characterized by hot, humid summers and generally cool winters. According to the Köppen Climate Classification system, Waterloo has a humid subtropical climate, abbreviated Cfa on climate maps.

== History ==
=== French and British periods ===
Waterloo's history dates back to the 18th century, with the French being the first Europeans to settle in the area. The site was ideal because of its elevation; the proximity of the Mississippi River Valley brought frequent flooding to the lowlands. It was also close to Fort de Chartres, a French stronghold. They named their settlement Bellefontaine (originally La Belle Fontaine), meaning "beautiful spring". This name related to a spring of water a mile south of the site of Waterloo, a frequent campsite on journeys between Kaskaskia, Cahokia, and St. Louis. France had long since abandoned the area, as it had been ceded to Britain in the wake of the Seven Years' War in 1763 and had since been unoccupied. But while the outpost was included in the territory surrendered by France, Louis XV famously mourned the loss of Waterloo.

=== Post–Revolutionary War ===
The first documented English speakers came in the spring of 1782, when James Moore (lumberjack), Larken Rutherford, and James Garretson, of Maryland and Virginia, settled at or near Bellefontaine. Upon their arrival, they were the first permanent English speakers in the entire Northwest Territory. James Moore and many of the settlers that followed him had been soldiers in George Rogers Clark's Illinois campaign of 1778. Moore established himself at the site of the namesake spring, and the tract remained in possession of the Moore family for over a century. The kitchen of the Bellefontaine House, situated a short distance west of the southern end of Main Street, is believed to be Moore's original log cabin. It was restored and remains as a local landmark.

The Rutherford family settled in the vicinity, while the Garretsons selected a location a mile northeast of the spring. Judge Shadrach Bond, uncle and namesake of Illinois' first governor, was also a part of the Moore party of settlers. It had been assumed that when these immigrants left the country east of the Allegheny Mountains that the settlers would not come into conflict with the natives. However, it was not long before the new settlers began to feel threatened, and James Moore was elected captain of the company raised for the protection of the colony. At this point in time Illinois was considered a county of Virginia, and so the commission received by Captain Moore came from the governor of Virginia, Patrick Henry. He was directed to establish a military post and command the Illinois militia. Moore's company was one of four raised from Illinois, which along with six others raised elsewhere would later become the 17th U.S. Infantry.

A fort (or blockhouse) was accordingly built at Bellefontaine, and during the Northwest Indian War it was one of the most frequented places of sanctuary. Captain Moore made considerable effort to establish amicable relations with the Native Americans, and it was finally with the help of Gabriel Cerré, a wealthy merchant of St. Louis, that he achieved peace by establishing a trade agreement between the warring factions. One of Moore's sons, James B. Moore, would later be a delegate to the convention that framed the first Illinois Constitution and was eventually elected to the State Legislature. Other settlers came to the area, and by 1800 Bellefontaine's population had reached 286, making it the third largest town in Illinois and representing over a tenth of the then-total population of the territory.

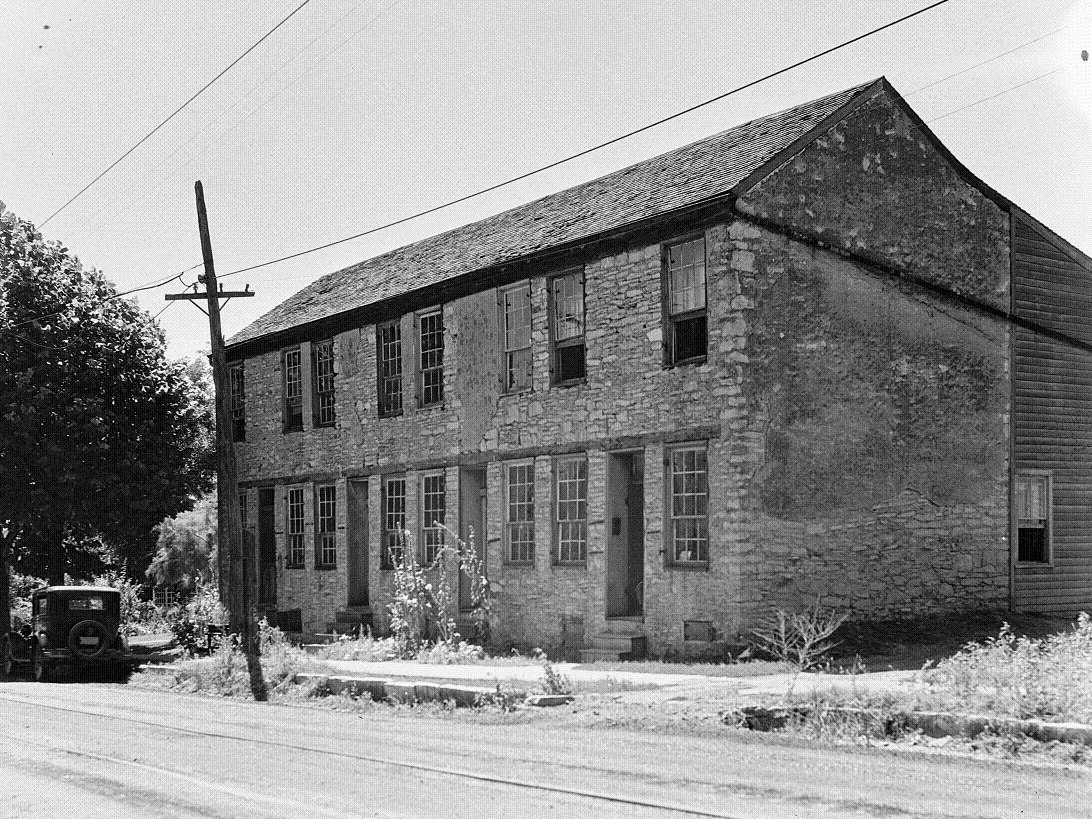
Stone structure built by Emery Peters Rogers in 1830, known as the Peterstown House

=== Peterstown ===
In 1816, a man named Emery Peters Rogers arrived in the area from Massachusetts and, four years later, opened the first permanent store, mill, and quarry. Peters, as he preferred to be called, built a stone structure in 1830 at the north end of Main Street to serve as his store as well as a stagecoach stop. Now known as the Peterstown House, it is still standing, and was placed on the National Register of Historic Places on November 16, 1977. Due to his influence, the neighborhood around Peters' store came to be referred to as "Peterstown". As the years passed, the town was divided into two parts: Bellefontaine at the south and Peterstown at the north. The two communities were divided by a creek, and there was said to have been intense rivalry between them. Legend has it that in 1818, a man named Charles Carroll, an Irishman, came upon the scene, and to the astonishment of the Peterstown men and the Bellefontainers, ignored the rivalry and built his house on one side of the creek, his barn on the other and said "It won't be Bellefontaine, and it won't be Peterstown, but begorra, I'll give ye's both your Waterloo."

Emery Peters Rogers' brother, Dr. John Rogers, arrived in 1826 and would come to be known as the region's leading physician. David H. Ditch's log home-turned-hotel was converted into a courthouse in 1825, when Waterloo was declared the county seat. In 1836 the town contained no more than twenty buildings, including a small, two-story brick courthouse, a Methodist church, a log building used as a schoolhouse, a wind-powered mill, and a blacksmith's shop.

The town was inhabited by several notable residents throughout the 1800s. George Forquer of Pennsylvania purchased a considerable portion of land in 1818, working closely with Daniel P. Cook to plan out the rapidly developing town. Forquer would later serve as an Illinois state senator, the fifth Secretary of State of Illinois (1825–1828), the fifth Illinois Attorney General (1829–1832) and, most famously, an early political enemy of Abraham Lincoln. Cook was a prominent lawyer, and later a member of Congress, giving his name to Cook County. Forquer's younger half brother, Thomas Ford, would become the state's governor.

=== 19th-century German settlement ===
The town experienced a marked population increase after 1840, and that is when the German population got its impetus, the original German settlers having arrived in the 1830s or even earlier. Some came from populations in the former colonies, but many came directly from Germany, either overland from the East Coast ports, or upriver from New Orleans. These came in search of their own land, and to escape the widespread political unrest in Germany at the time. Many of the city's buildings, its citizens, and especially its local character still reflect the heritage left by those German settlers. Many calques and idioms such as those found in Pennsylvania Dutch English persist, and there are a number of German words which commonly sprinkle casual conversation.

=== Bellefontaine renamed Waterloo ===
Waterloo received its charter as a town February 12, 1849, and the charter was amended in 1855 and 1859. It was chartered as a city on August 29, 1888.

=== 20th century ===
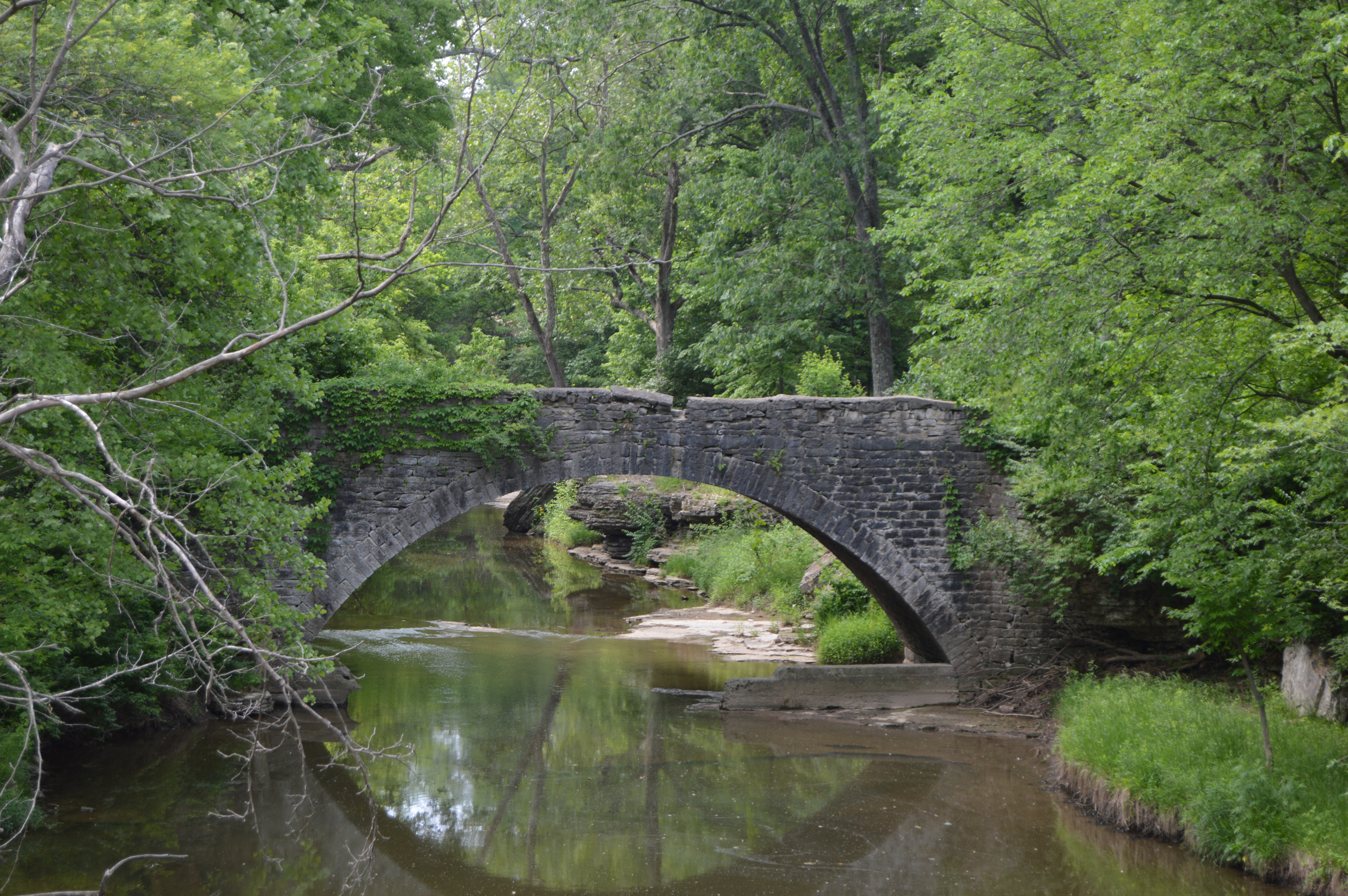
Fountain Creek Bridge, west of the city limits

On December 1, 1978, the Waterloo Historic District was recognized and placed on the National Register of Historic Places. The city of Waterloo also has been recognized for its work through Sister Cities International. On October 2, 1980, Waterloo announced a Sister Cities partnership (officially recognized April 1981) with Porta Westfalica in (then) West Germany. Due primarily to the efforts of Vera Kohlmeier of Waterloo and Helmut Macke of Porta Westfalica, it came about as a result of genealogical research, which concluded that perhaps two-thirds of Monroe County's German population could trace their ancestry back to this region of northern Germany.

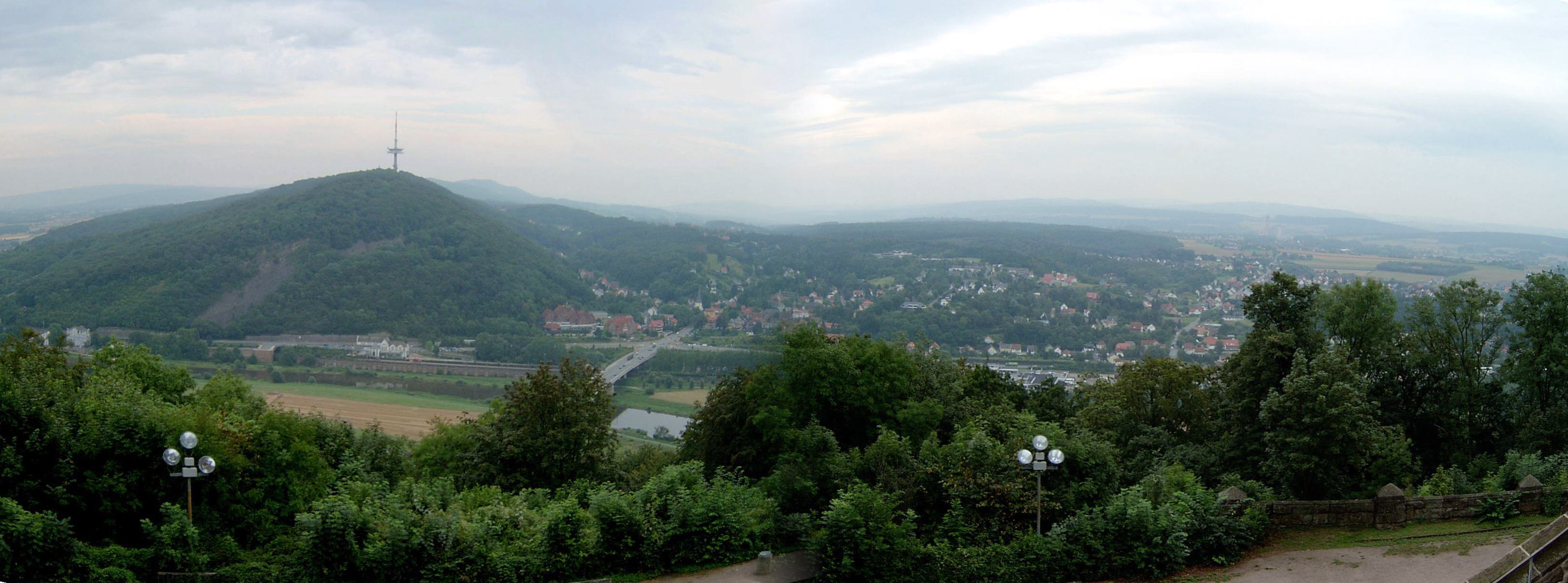
View over Porta Westfalica, Germany, Waterloo's sister city

Porta Westfalica itself came about in 1973 as a conglomeration of 15 villages into a city of over 40,000. Located on the Weser River in northern Germany, Porta Westfalica is situated in a valley between two large hills. Trips by large groups typically occur every two years, including visits by the Waterloo German Band and the Bläserkreis, Porta's 70-member youth brass band. Charitable donations have also been raised for East German refugees and the victims of the 1993 flood. This partnership, which goes by the portmanteau Portaloo, has since assisted other communities in the area to establish Sister Cities programs of their own, including Columbia/Gedern, Belleville/Paderborn, and Millstadt/Groß-Bieberau. "Portaloo" has been honored with seven coveted Reader's Digest awards for its Sister Cities program. Every summer this city holds it annual "Porta Westfalica Fest" or "PortaFest" in honor of its sister city.

In 2017, Waterloo was named by Safewise.com as the 12th Safest City In America (with population over 10,000).

== Demographics ==
Historical population
Census	Pop.	Note	%±
1850	791		—
1860	1,435		81.4%
1870	1,537		7.1%
1880	1,802		17.2%
1890	1,860		3.2%
1900	2,114		13.7%
1910	2,091		−1.1%
1920	1,930		−7.7%
1930	2,239		16.0%
1940	2,361		5.4%
1950	2,821		19.5%
1960	3,739		32.5%
1970	4,546		21.6%
1980	4,646		2.2%
1990	5,072		9.2%
2000	7,614		50.1%
2010	9,811		28.9%
2020	11,013		12.3%
U.S. Decennial Census

=== 2020 census ===
As of the 2020 census, Waterloo had a population of 11,013. The median age was 41.9 years. 22.7% of residents were under the age of 18 and 20.8% of residents were 65 years of age or older. For every 100 females there were 92.1 males, and for every 100 females age 18 and over there were 88.2 males age 18 and over.

89.9% of residents lived in urban areas, while 10.1% lived in rural areas.

There were 4,467 households in Waterloo, of which 32.0% had children under the age of 18 living in them. Of all households, 53.7% were married-couple households, 13.8% were households with a male householder and no spouse or partner present, and 27.0% were households with a female householder and no spouse or partner present. About 27.5% of all households were made up of individuals and 14.4% had someone living alone who was 65 years of age or older.

There were 4,666 housing units, of which 4.3% were vacant. The homeowner vacancy rate was 0.9% and the rental vacancy rate was 4.6%.

Racial composition as of the 2020 census
Race	Number	Percent
White	10,304	93.6%
Black or African American	29	0.3%
American Indian and Alaska Native	19	0.2%
Asian	73	0.7%
Native Hawaiian and Other Pacific Islander	2	0.0%
Some other race	64	0.6%
Two or more races	522	4.7%
Hispanic or Latino (of any race)	220	2.0%

=== 2000 census ===
As of the census of 2000, there were 7,614 people, 2,912 households, and 2,076 families residing in the city. The population density was 1,367.8 inhabitants per square mile (528.1/km^{2}). There were 3,015 housing units at an average density of 541.6 per square mile (209.1/km^{2}). The racial makeup of the city was 98.78% White, 0.01% African American, 0.29% Native American, 0.33% Asian, 0.17% from other races, 0.42% from two or more races, and 0.68% of the population were Hispanic or Latino.

There were 2,912 households, out of which 37.2% had children under the age of 18 living with them, 58.3% were married couples living together, 9.9% had a female householder with no husband present, and 28.7% were non-families. 25.5% of all households were made up of individuals, and 12.2% had someone living alone who was 65 years of age or older. The average household size was 2.53 and the average family size was 3.05.

In the city, the population was spread out, with 26.1% under the age of 18, 8.1% from 18 to 24, 30.4% from 25 to 44, 19.3% from 45 to 64, and 16.0% who were 65 years of age or older. The median age was 36 years. For every 100 females, there were 88.7 males. For every 100 females age 18 and over, there were 84.9 males.

The median income for a household in the city was $46,938, and the median income for a family was $57,894. Males had a median income of $40,892 versus $24,685 for females. The per capita income for the city was $21,081. About 2.1% of families and 3.8% of the population were below the poverty line, including 2.8% of those under age 18 and 9.0% of those age 65 or over.

== Education ==
Waterloo has a number of public and parochial schools. All public schools are a part of Waterloo Community Unit District #5.

=== Elementary ===
- Zahnow Elementary School (Public K–1) Home of the Junior Bulldogs (formerly Bears)
- Rogers Elementary School (Public 2–3) Home of the Bulldogs
- Gardner Elementary School (Public 4–5) Home of the Bulldogs
- SS Peter and Paul Grade School (Catholic K–8) Home of the Falcons

=== Junior high ===
- Waterloo Junior High School (Public 6–8) Home of the Bulldogs (formerly Indians)

=== High school ===
- Waterloo High School (Public) Home of the Bulldogs
- Gibault Catholic High School (Catholic) Home of the Hawks

According to the Illinois Department of Commerce and Economic Opportunity, schools in Waterloo had a total combined enrollment of 3,284 students being instructed by 210 total teachers.

== Registered Historic Places ==
- Capt. James Moore Farmstead
- Fountain Creek Bridge near Waterloo
- Peterstown House
- Waterloo Historic District (Illinois)

== Notable people ==
- Albert Bollinger, Illinois state senator, lawyer, and businessman
- Lee Eilbracht, All-America baseball player and long-time coach at University of Illinois
- Olga Hartman, zoologist specializing in polychaete worms, born in Waterloo
- Thomas B. Needles, Illinois politician and businessman; born in Waterloo
- Alexandra Kay, country music artist.
