= Decatur, Illinois =

City in Macon County, Illinois, United States

- City
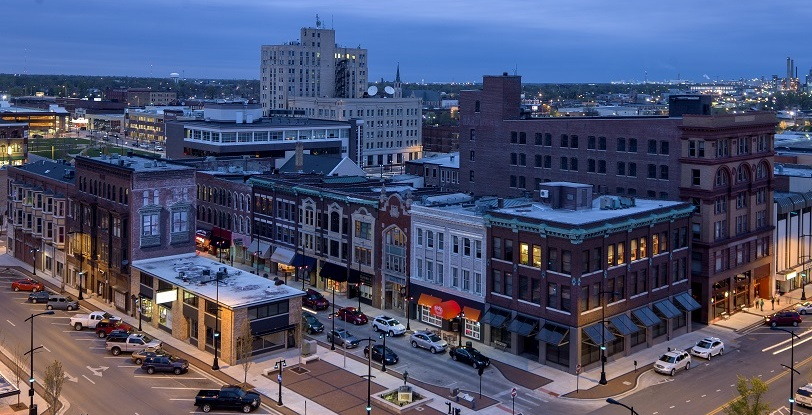
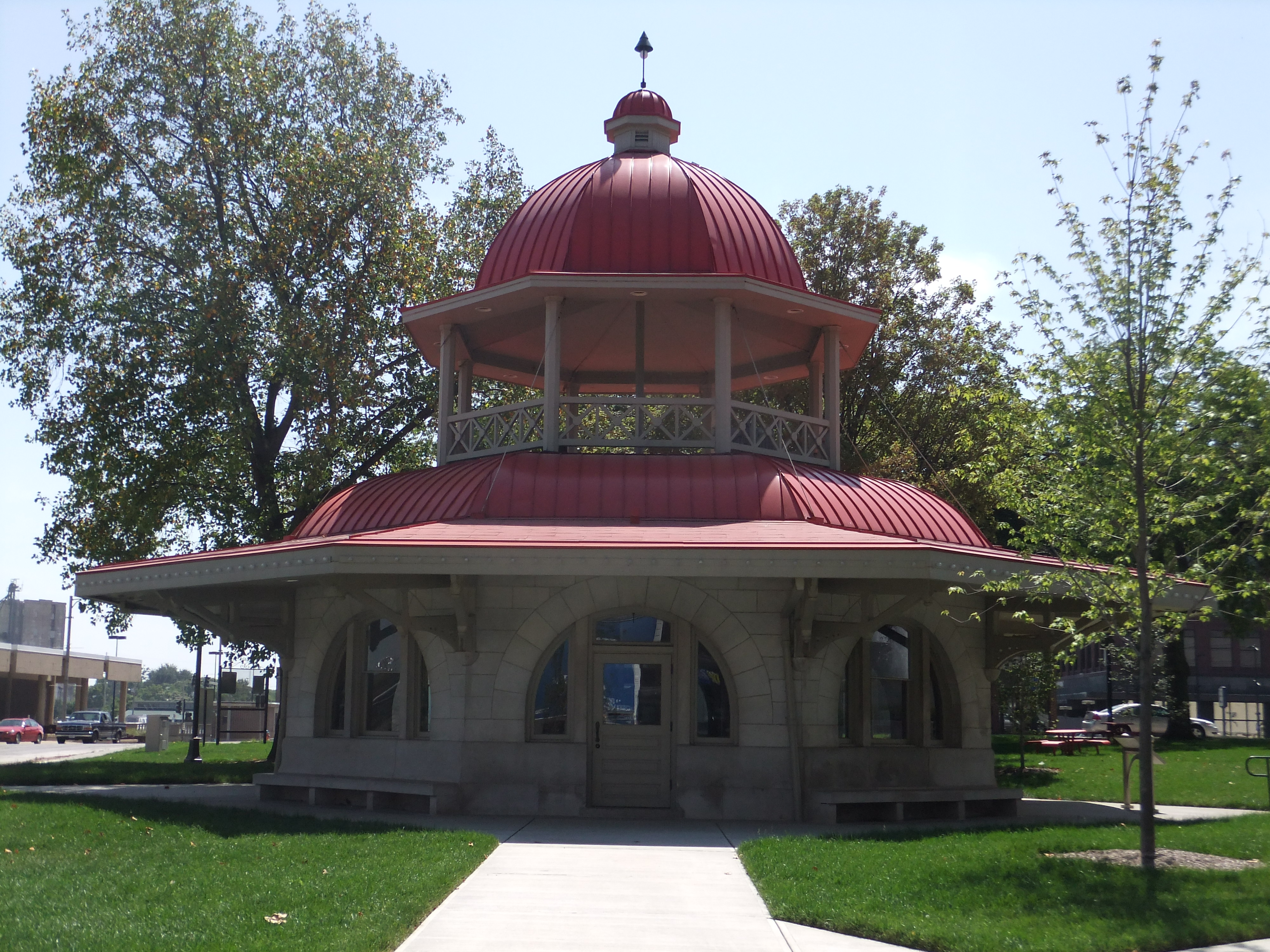
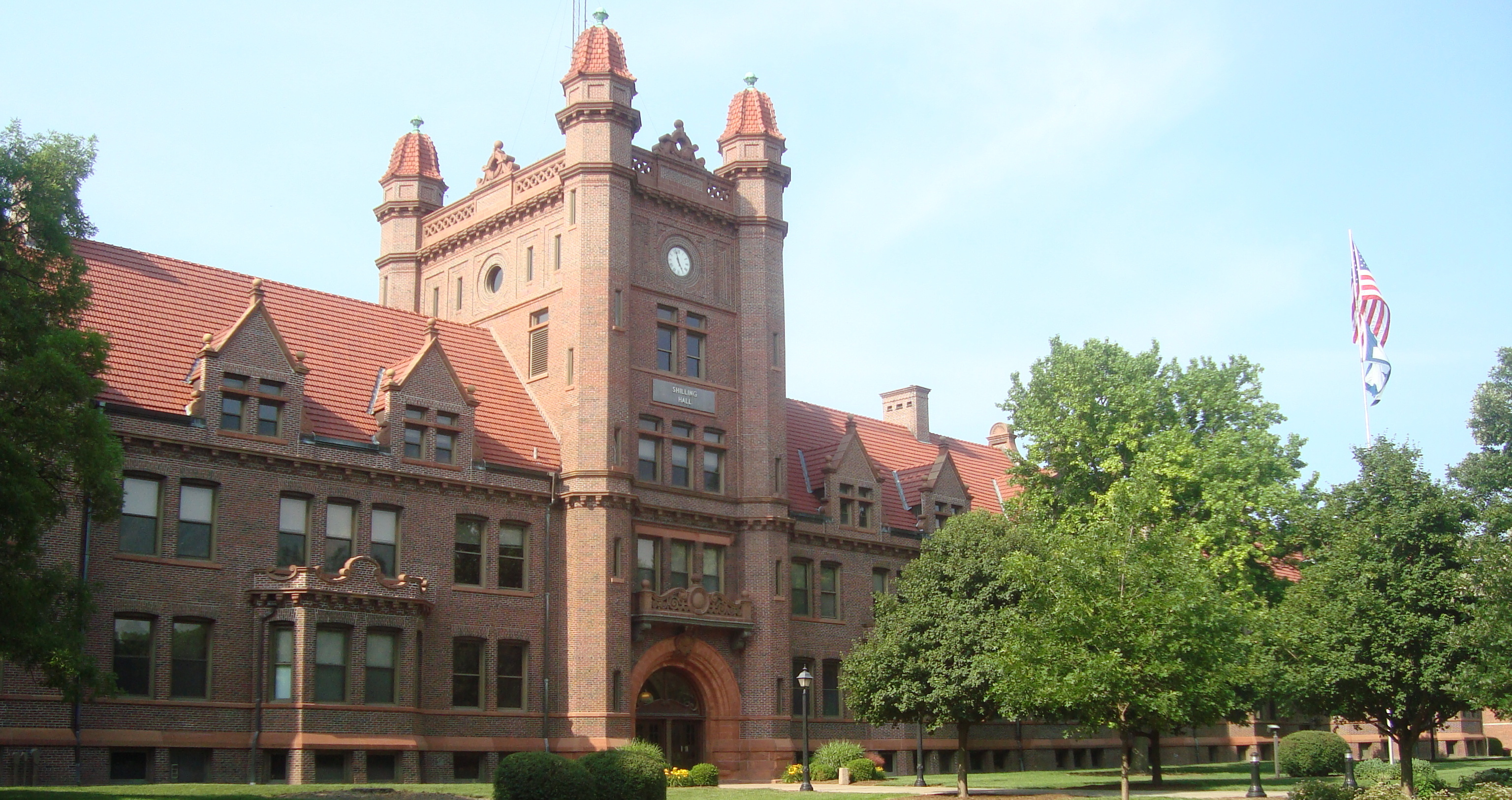
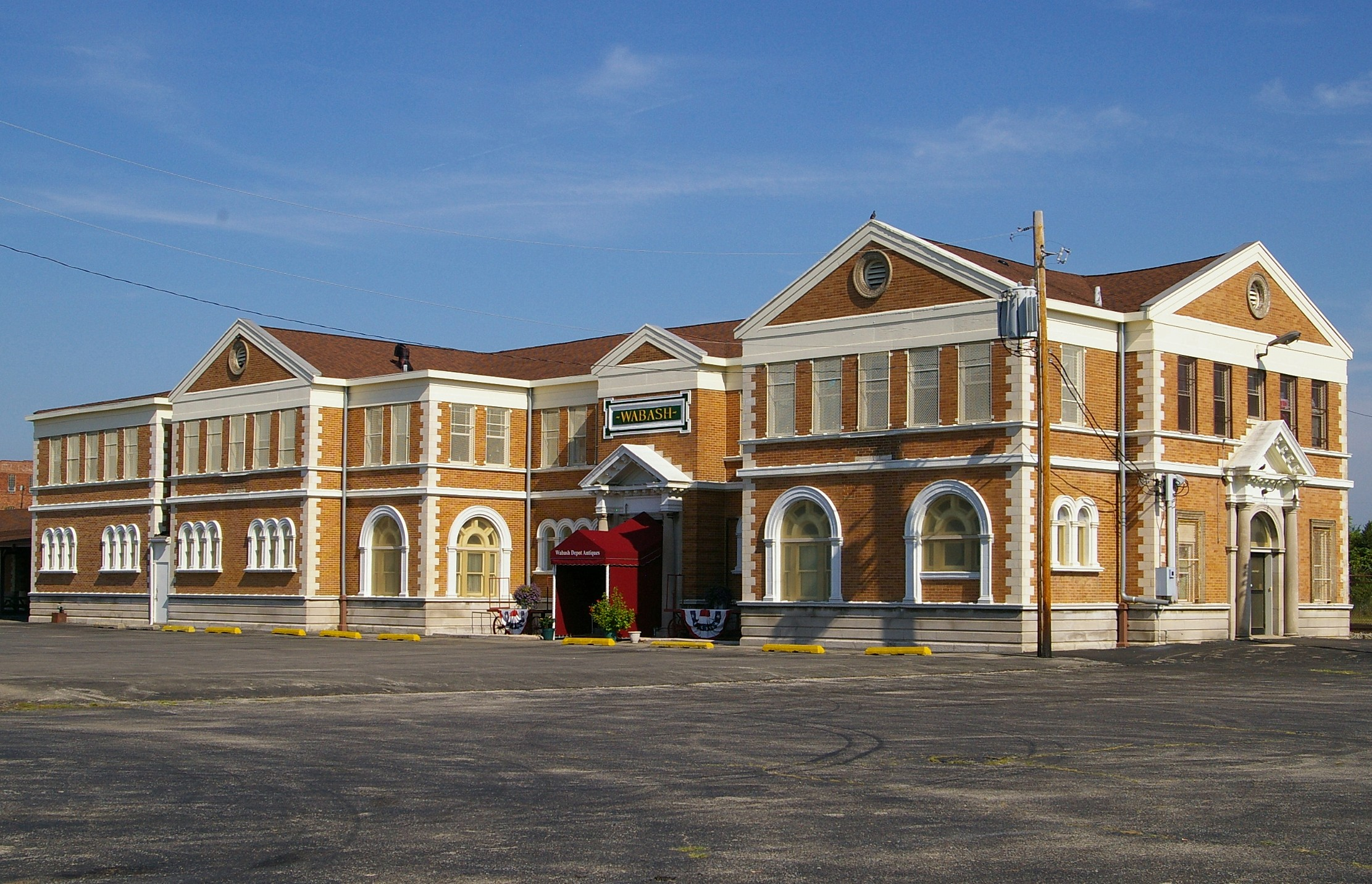
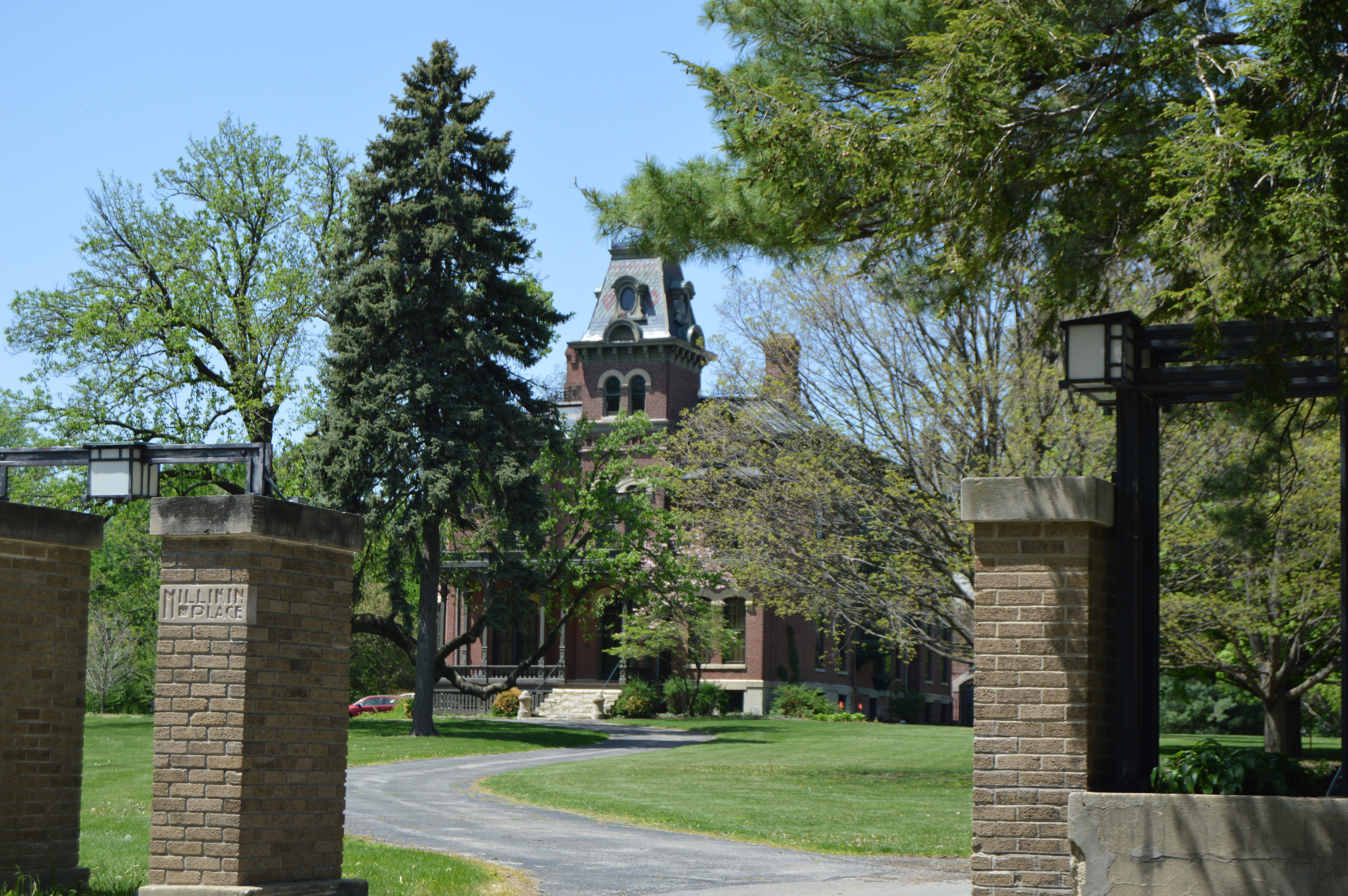
- Downtown Decatur Transfer House Millikin University Wabash Railroad Station James Millikin House

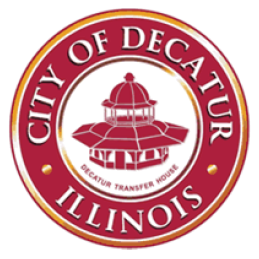
- Seal
- Nicknames: Soy City, Soybean Capital of the World, Limitless Decatur
- Interactive map of Decatur, Illinois
- Location within Illinois Location within the United States
- Coordinates: 39°50′29.12″N 88°57′21.17″W
- Country: United States
- State: Illinois
- County: Macon
- Townships: Decatur, Harristown, Hickory Point, Long Creek, Oakley, South Wheatland, Whitmore
- Founded: 1823

Government
  - Mayor: Julie Moore Wolfe

Area
  - Total: 47.79 sq mi (123.78 km^{2})
  - Land: 43.11 sq mi (111.65 km^{2})
  - Water: 4.68 sq mi (12.13 km^{2}) 10.0%
- Elevation: 676 ft (206 m)

Population (2020)
  - Total: 70,522
  - Estimate (2024): 68,763 ▼
  - Density: 1,635.9/sq mi (631.63/km^{2})
- Time zone: UTC−5 (CST)
  - Summer (DST): EDT
- ZIP Codes: 62521–62523, 62526
- Area codes: 217, 447
- FIPS code: 17-18823
- Website: decaturil.gov

Decatur (/dɪˈkeɪtər/ dih-KAY-tər) is the largest city in Macon County, Illinois, United States, and its county seat. The city was founded in 1829 and is situated along the Sangamon River and Lake Decatur in Central Illinois. As of the 2020 census, it had a population of 70,522. It is the 17th-most populous city in Illinois and the "fastest shrinking city" in Illinois. Decatur has an economy based on industrial and agricultural commodity processing and production. The city is home to Millikin University and Richland Community College.

== History ==
=== 19th century ===
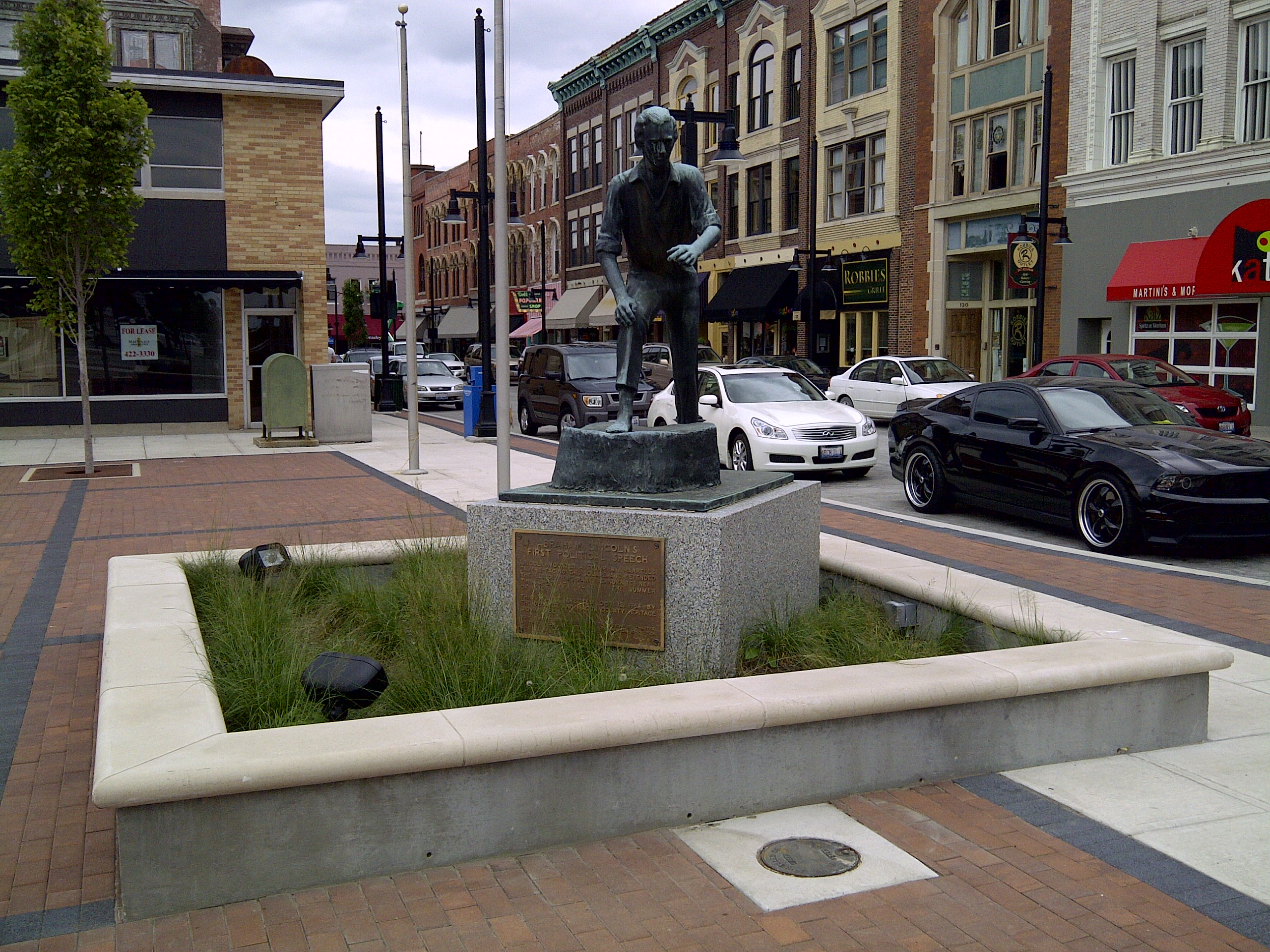
Statue of Abraham Lincoln in downtown Decatur on the site of his first political speech.

The city is named after War of 1812 naval hero Stephen Decatur. The Potawatomi Trail of Death passed through the city in 1838. Post No. 1 of the Grand Army of the Republic was founded as a fraternal organization composed of veterans of the Union Army (United States Army), Union Navy (U.S. Navy), and the Marines who served in the American Civil War. It was founded in Decatur on April 6, 1866.

Decatur was the first home in Illinois of Abraham Lincoln, who settled just west of Decatur with his family in 1830. A historical marker in Decatur claims that, at the age of 21, Lincoln gave his first political speech in Decatur, defending state Whig party leaders. As a lawyer on the 8th Judicial Circuit, Lincoln made frequent stops in Decatur, and argued five cases in the log courthouse that stood on the corner of Main & Main Streets. The original courthouse is now on the grounds of the Macon County Historical Museum on North Fork Road. John Hanks, first cousin of Abraham Lincoln, lived in Decatur.

On May 9 and 10, 1860, the Illinois Republican State Convention was held in Decatur. At this convention, Lincoln received his first endorsement for President of the United States as "The Railsplitter Candidate". In commemoration of Lincoln's bicentennial, the Illinois Republican State Convention was held in Decatur at the Decatur Conference Center and Hotel on June 6 and 7, 2008.

=== 20th century ===
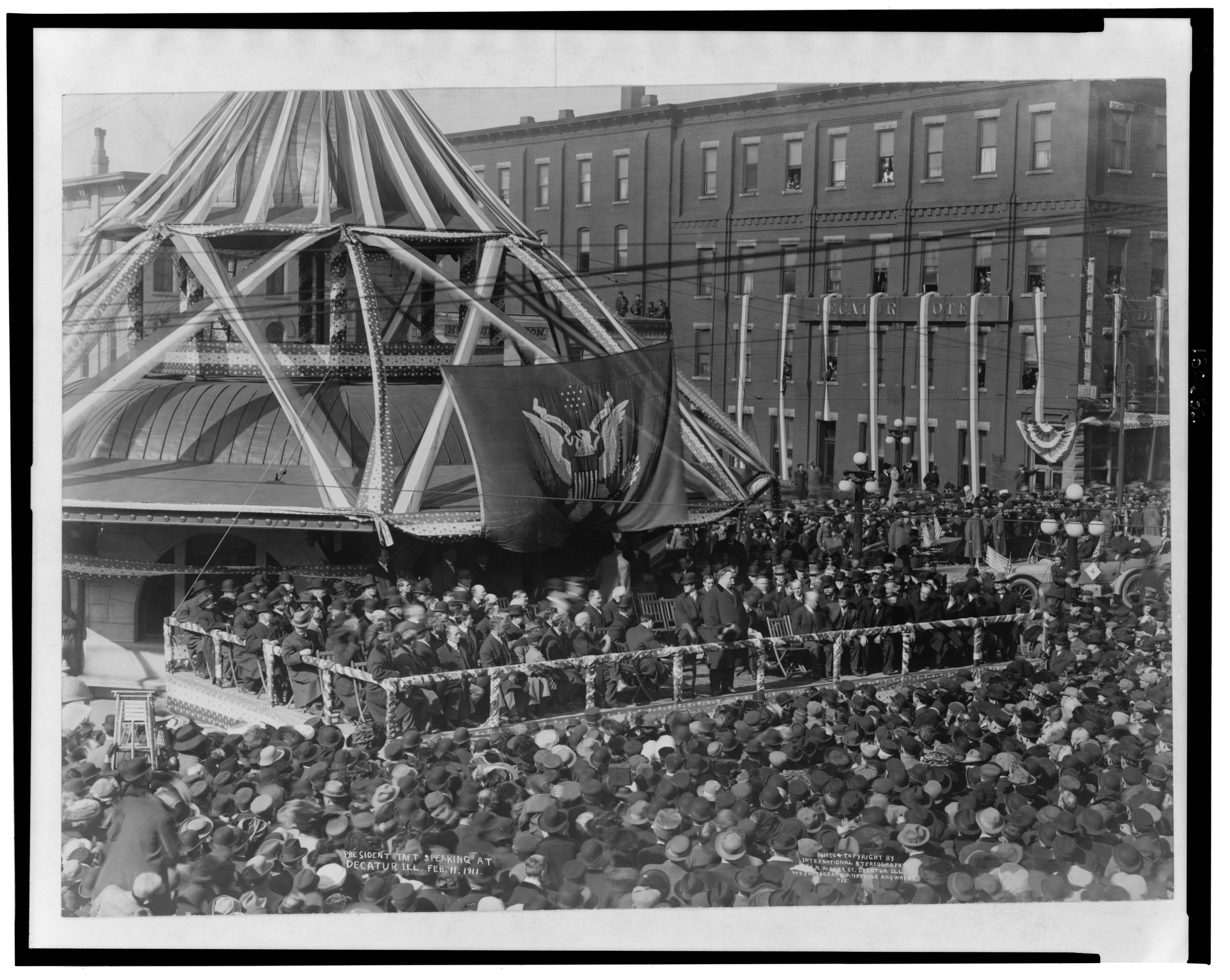
President William Howard Taft speaking in Decatur, 1911

The first modern fly-destruction device (fly swatter) was invented in 1900 by Robert R. Montgomery, an entrepreneur based in Decatur, Ill. Montgomery was issued Patent No. 640,790 for the Fly-Killer, a "cheap device of unusual elasticity and durability" made of wire netting, "preferably oblong," attached to a handle.

For much of the 20th century, the city was known as "The Soybean Capital of the World" owing to its being the location of the headquarters of A. E. Staley Manufacturing Company, a major grain processor in the 1920s, which popularized the use of soybeans to produce products for human consumption such as oil, meal and flour. At one time, over a third of all the soybeans grown in the world were processed in Decatur, Illinois. In 1955 a group of Decatur businessmen founded the Soy Capital Bank to trade on the nickname.

Decatur was awarded the All-America City Award in 1960, one of eleven cities honored that year. Decatur is an affiliate of the U.S. Main Street program, in conjunction with the National Trust for Historic Preservation.

On July 19, 1974, a tanker car containing isobutane collided with a boxcar in the Norfolk & Western railroad yard in the East End of Decatur. The resulting explosion killed seven people, injured 349, and caused $18 million in property damage including extensive damage to nearby Lakeview High School.

On April 18 and 19, 1996, the city was hit by tornadoes. On April 18, an F1 tornado hit the city's southeast side, followed by an F3 tornado the following evening on the northwest side. That same tornado then skipped twice, hitting businesses on the northeast side. The two storms totaled approximately $10.5 million in property damage.

A new branding effort for Decatur and Macon County was unveiled in 2015, Limitless Decatur. The marketing strategy intended to attract and retain business and residents by promoting the Decatur area as modern and progressive with opportunities to live, work, and develop.

==== Jesse Jackson protest ====
In November 1999, Decatur was brought into the national news when Jesse Jackson and the Rainbow/PUSH Coalition protested the two-year expulsion of seven African American students who had been involved in a serious fight at an Eisenhower High School football game under a recently enacted "zero tolerance" policy. Six of the students were arrested but not charged after the fracas. Four were later charged as adults with mob action, a felony. Jesse Jackson intervened in the incident, bringing the controversy to national attention, protesting both the severity and length of the punishment and also alleging racial bias (schools in Decatur in 1999 had an enrollment that was about 44 percent black, while five of the six Decatur students expelled in the prior year were black). Jackson pointed out he was invited by the students' parents and that he spoke with them, the kids, ministers and teachers before protesting the zero-tolerance severity of the punishment: "No one can survive zero tolerance," Jackson said. "We all need mercy and grace."

Outside of Decatur, public support was largely against the School Board's decision but changed once a videotape of the incident surfaced filmed by a parent at the game. Broadcast on national TV news, it showed a melee that swept through one end of the grandstands, with kicking and punching, as some of the fighters tumbled over the rails. The game was stopped and players gawked at the fighting in the bleachers. Ed Boehm, the principal at MacArthur High School who attended the game, described it as a riot: "I feared for the safety of our people -- my parents, my students," Boehm said, referring to the crowd in the bleachers. "You had people pushed through bars, people covering little children so they wouldn't get hurt. It was violent." Jackson and his Rainbow PUSH Coalition organized marches that included hundreds of people bused in from outside the area, criticizing the school board for what Jackson said was unfairly harsh treatment of the boys over a fight. Jackson was arrested and detained briefly; however, charges were later dropped. School officials say the students involved in the fighting were known as truants, described three of them as "third-year freshmen", and noted that the seven students had missed a combined 350 days of high school.

The issue dissipated when the school board reduced the original expulsions from two years to one year and agreed to let the students earn credit while attending an alternative school.

The students involved in the fight have since taken different paths in life: one having been sentenced to state prison for 10 years for a 2004 felony drug conviction; another having finished college (helped by a Rainbow PUSH scholarship); another working as a butcher; and a fourth being arrested for home invasion in 2009. Jesse Jackson was criticized for turning what could have been a legitimate criticism/discussion of the effects of "zero tolerance" policies into national debate by attempting to present the seven youths as victims of bigotry.

=== Corporate exits and population loss ===
In 2014, ADM moved its upper corporate management out of Decatur and established the new ADM World Headquarters in downtown Chicago. Following the ADM corporate exit, Decatur became listed by the United States Census Bureau as number 3 in "The 15 Fastest-Declining Large Cities" which showed a 7.1% population loss of (-5,376) from 2010 to 2019.

The Japanese corporation Bridgestone owns Firestone Tire and Rubber Company, which operated a large tire factory here. Firestone's Decatur plant was closed in December 2001 amid a tire failure controversy. All 1,500 employees were laid off. Firestone cited a decline in consumer demand for Firestone tires and the age of the Decatur plant as the reasons for closing that facility.

== Geography ==
The USGS Domestic GeoNames resource has two listings for Decatur: "City of Decatur", which is a Civil-class designation, and "Decatur", which is a Populated Place designation. The two listings have slightly different coordinate centroids; the "City of Decatur" centroid is located at 39.8556417°N 88.9337090°W, while the "Decatur" centroid is at 39.8403147°N 88.9548001°W. Decatur is 150 miles southwest of Chicago, 40 miles east of Springfield, the state capital, and 110 miles northeast of St. Louis.

According to the 2010 census, the city consisted of 42.22 square miles (109.35 km^{2}) of land and 4.69 square miles (12.15 km^{2}) of water, amounting to a total area of 46.91 square miles (121.50 km^{2}), consisting of 90% land and 10% water. Lakes include Lake Decatur, an 11 km^{2} reservoir formed in 1923 by the damming of the Sangamon River.

The Decatur Metropolitan Statistical Area (population 109,900) includes surrounding towns of Argenta, Boody, Blue Mound, Elwin, Forsyth, Harristown, Long Creek, Macon, Maroa, Mount Zion, Niantic, Oakley, Oreana, and Warrensburg.

=== Neighborhoods ===
On July 19, 1999, the Department of Community Development prepared a map of the official neighborhoods of Decatur, used for planning and statistical purposes. Decatur has 71 official neighborhoods.

=== Climate ===
Decatur has a humid continental climate (Köppen Dfa).

Climate data for Decatur WTP, Illinois (1991–2020 normals, extremes 1893–present)
Month	Jan	Feb	Mar	Apr	May	Jun	Jul	Aug	Sep	Oct	Nov	Dec	Year
Record high °F (°C)	73 (23)	76 (24)	89 (32)	94 (34)	101 (38)	105 (41)	113 (45)	106 (41)	104 (40)	96 (36)	83 (28)	72 (22)	113 (45)
Mean daily maximum °F (°C)	34.0 (1.1)	39.1 (3.9)	50.8 (10.4)	63.4 (17.4)	73.5 (23.1)	82.2 (27.9)	84.7 (29.3)	83.5 (28.6)	77.7 (25.4)	65.3 (18.5)	50.3 (10.2)	38.6 (3.7)	61.9 (16.6)
Daily mean °F (°C)	26.9 (−2.8)	31.3 (−0.4)	41.8 (5.4)	53.3 (11.8)	63.7 (17.6)	72.6 (22.6)	75.6 (24.2)	74.2 (23.4)	67.3 (19.6)	55.5 (13.1)	42.3 (5.7)	31.8 (−0.1)	53.0 (11.7)
Mean daily minimum °F (°C)	19.7 (−6.8)	23.5 (−4.7)	32.8 (0.4)	43.3 (6.3)	53.8 (12.1)	63.1 (17.3)	66.5 (19.2)	64.9 (18.3)	57.0 (13.9)	45.7 (7.6)	34.3 (1.3)	25.0 (−3.9)	44.1 (6.7)
Record low °F (°C)	−23 (−31)	−25 (−32)	−10 (−23)	15 (−9)	25 (−4)	32 (0)	45 (7)	35 (2)	20 (−7)	12 (−11)	−3 (−19)	−22 (−30)	−25 (−32)
Average precipitation inches (mm)	2.40 (61)	2.00 (51)	2.64 (67)	4.12 (105)	4.95 (126)	4.73 (120)	4.00 (102)	3.50 (89)	3.08 (78)	3.41 (87)	3.21 (82)	2.40 (61)	40.44 (1,027)
Average snowfall inches (cm)	5.9 (15)	2.5 (6.4)	0.9 (2.3)	0.4 (1.0)	0.0 (0.0)	0.0 (0.0)	0.0 (0.0)	0.0 (0.0)	0.0 (0.0)	0.0 (0.0)	0.4 (1.0)	3.5 (8.9)	13.6 (35)
Average precipitation days (≥ 0.01 in)	9.2	8.3	9.9	11.4	13.3	10.5	9.5	7.4	7.8	9.6	9.4	9.2	115.5
Average snowy days (≥ 0.1 in)	3.7	2.3	0.7	0.2	0.0	0.0	0.0	0.0	0.0	0.0	0.4	2.3	9.6
Source: NOAA

== Demographics ==
Historical population
Census	Pop.	Note	%±
1860	3,839		—
1870	7,161		86.5%
1880	9,547		33.3%
1890	16,841		76.4%
1900	20,754		23.2%
1910	31,140		50.0%
1920	43,818		40.7%
1930	57,510		31.2%
1940	59,305		3.1%
1950	66,269		11.7%
1960	78,004		17.7%
1970	90,397		15.9%
1980	93,939		3.9%
1990	83,885		−10.7%
2000	81,860		−2.4%
2010	76,122		−7.0%
2020	70,522		−7.4%
2021 (est.)	69,646		−1.2%
U.S. Decennial Census; 2010 2020

=== Racial and ethnic composition ===
Decatur city, Illinois Racial and ethnic composition Note: the US Census treats Hispanic/Latino as an ethnic category. This table excludes Latinos from the racial categories and assigns them to a separate category. Hispanics/Latinos may be of any race.
Race / Ethnicity (NH = Non-Hispanic)	Pop 2000	Pop 2010	Pop 2020	% 2000	% 2010	% 2020
White alone (NH)	62,993	53,749	44,371	76.95%	70.61%	62.92%
Black or African American alone (NH)	15,846	17,600	18,606	19.36%	23.12%	26.38%
Native American or Alaska Native alone (NH)	124	155	124	0.15%	0.20%	0.18%
Asian alone (NH)	536	695	910	0.65%	0.91%	1.29%
Native Hawaiian or Pacific Islander alone (NH)	13	18	22	0.02%	0.02%	0.03%
Other race alone (NH)	110	128	327	0.13%	0.17%	0.46%
Mixed race or Multiracial (NH)	1,260	2,127	3,995	1.54%	2.79%	5.66%
Hispanic or Latino (any race)	978	1,650	2,167	1.19%	2.17%	3.07%
Total	81,860	76,122	70,522	100.00%	100.00%	100.00%

=== 2020 census ===
As of the 2020 census, Decatur had a population of 70,522 and 31,180 households.

The median age was 40.2 years. 21.6% of residents were under the age of 18 and 20.0% were 65 years of age or older. For every 100 females there were 90.0 males, and for every 100 females age 18 and over there were 85.9 males age 18 and over.

99.3% of residents lived in urban areas, while 0.7% lived in rural areas.

Of the 31,180 households, 24.9% had children under the age of 18 living in them. Of all households, 32.0% were married-couple households, 22.6% were households with a male householder and no spouse or partner present, and 37.3% were households with a female householder and no spouse or partner present. About 38.6% of all households were made up of individuals and 15.5% had someone living alone who was 65 years of age or older. The average family size was 3.00 persons.

There were 35,430 housing units, of which 12.0% were vacant. The homeowner vacancy rate was 2.6% and the rental vacancy rate was 10.8%.

Racial composition as of the 2020 census
Race	Number	Percent
White	44,894	63.7%
Black or African American	18,744	26.6%
American Indian and Alaska Native	174	0.2%
Asian	913	1.3%
Native Hawaiian and Other Pacific Islander	27	0.0%
Some other race	1,025	1.5%
Two or more races	4,745	6.7%

=== 2010 census ===
As of the 2010 census, there were 76,122 people, 32,344 households, and 18,991 families residing in the city. The population density was 1,800.9 inhabitants per square mile (695.3/km^{2}). There were 36,134 housing units at an average density of 854.8 per square mile (330.0/km^{2}). The racial makeup of the city was 71.6% White, 23.3% African American, 0.2% Native American, 0.9% Asian, 0.9% from other races, and 3.1% from two or more races. Hispanic or Latino people of any race were 2.2% of the population.

There were 32,344 households, out of which 24.2% had children under the age of 18 living with them, 37.4% were married couples living together, 16.9% had a female household with no husband present, and 41.3% were non-families. 35.2% of all households were made up of individuals, and 13.2% had someone living alone who was 65 years of age or older. The average household size was 2.23 and the average family size was 2.86.

In the city, the population was spread out, with 22.1% under the age of 18, 10.8% from ages 18 to 24, 23.4% from ages 25 to 44, 26.8% from ages 45 to 64, and 16.9% who were 65 years of age or older. The median age was 39.1 years. For every 100 females, there were 88.0 males. For every 100 females aged 18 and over, there were 85.3 males.

As of 2017, the median income for a household in the city was $41,977, and the median income for a family was $55,086. Males had a median income of $35,418 versus $34,389 for females. The per capita income for the city was $25,042. About 22% of the population is below the poverty line, including 35% of those under age 18 and 10% of those age 65 or over.

Decatur is listed by the United States Census Bureau as number three in "The 15 Fastest-Declining Large Cities" which showed a 7.1% population loss of (−5,376) from 2010 to 2019. The Chicago Tribune says: "in 1980, Decatur's population was at a high of 94,000. Now it is 71,000."

== Economy ==
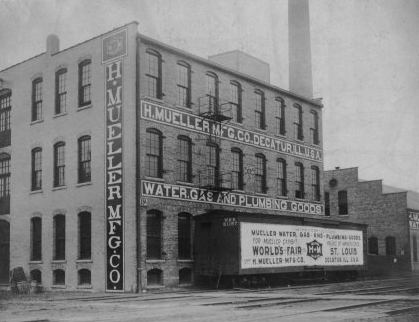
Mueller Co. c. 1904

=== Industry ===
Decatur has production facilities for Caterpillar, Archer Daniels Midland, Mueller Co., and Primient.

Caterpillar Inc. has one of its largest manufacturing plants in the U.S. in Decatur. This plant produces Caterpillar's off-highway trucks, wheel-tractor scrapers, compactors, large wheel loaders, mining-class motorgraders, and their ultra-class mining trucks (including the Caterpillar 797). Archer Daniels Midland processes corn and soybeans, Mueller produces water distribution products and Tate & Lyle processes corn in Decatur.

Decatur has been ranked third in the nation as an Emerging Logistics and Distribution Center by Business Facilities: The Location Advisor, and was named a Top 25 Trade City by Global Trade. In 2013 the Economic Development Corporation of Decatur & Macon County established the Midwest Inland Port, a multi-modal transportation hub with market proximity to 95 million customers in a 500-mile radius. The port includes the Archer Daniels Midland intermodal container ramp, the two class I railroads that service the ramp and the city (the Canadian National Railway, and the Norfolk Southern Railway), five major roadways and the Decatur Airport. The Midwest Inland Port also has a foreign trade zone and customs clearing, and the area is both an enterprise zone and tax increment financing district.

In August 2019, Mueller Company announced plans to construct a "state-of-the-art" brass foundry in Decatur on a 30-acre site in the 2700 block of North Jasper Street. The facility is expected to employ 250 personnel.

In November 2020, ADM and InnovaFeed announced plans to construct the world's largest insect protein facility targeted to begin in 2021. The facility will be owned and operated by InnovaFeed and will co-locate with ADM's Decatur corn processing complex. This new project represents innovative, sustainable production to meet growing demand for insect protein in animal feed, a market that has potential to reach 1 million tons in 2027. Construction of the new high-capacity facility is expected to create more than 280 direct and 400 indirect jobs in the Decatur region by the second phase.

=== Top employers ===
According to the EDC of Decatur & Macon County, the top employers in Decatur as of 2019 were as follows:

Employer	# of employees
Archer Daniels Midland	4,000
Caterpillar Inc.	3,150
Decatur Memorial Hospital	1,903
Decatur Public Schools	1,752
HSHS St. Mary's Hospital	930
Ameren Illinois	630
Millikin University	600
Primient	600
Mueller Co.	585
The Kelly Group	575

=== Former employers ===
From 1917 to 1922, Decatur was the location of the Comet Automobile Company, and the Pan-American Motor Corporation.

In 1950, the Marvel-Schebler Division of BorgWarner opened a new facility in Decatur. The plant, which once had as many as 1,300 employees, was sold to Facet Aerospace Products in 1982. The plant closed in April 1983.

In early November 1992, business executive Mark Whitacre of Decatur-based Archer Daniels Midland confessed to an FBI agent that ADM executives, including Whitacre himself, had routinely met with competitors to fix the price of lysine, a food additive. The lysine conspirators, including ADM, ultimately settled federal charges for more than $100 million. ADM also paid hundreds of millions of dollars ($400 million alone on the high-fructose corn syrup class action case) to plaintiffs and customers that it stole from during the price-fixing schemes.

== Arts and culture ==
=== Music ===
The Decatur Municipal Band was organized September 19, 1857, making it one of the oldest nonmilitary bands in continuous service in the United States and Canada. The band was originally known as the Decatur Brass Band, Decatur Comet Band and Decatur Silver Band until 1871 when it was reorganized by Andrew Goodman and became The Goodman Band. In 1942, the band was officially designated as the Decatur Municipal Band and chartered within the City of Decatur. The present Decatur Municipal Band, directed by Jim Culbertson since 1979, is composed of high school and college students and area adults from all walks of life, many of whom look to the Band as a serious avocation, or as a prelude to a life-long profession.

=== Historic sites ===
Transfer House c. 1910

The city's symbol is the Transfer House, an 1896 octagonal structure that was built in the original town square (now called "Lincoln Square") where the city's mass transit lines (streetcars and interurban trains) met. Designed by Chicago architect William W. Boyington, who also designed the Chicago Water Tower, the Transfer House was constructed to serve as a shelter for passengers transferring from one conveyance to another. It was regarded as one of the most beautiful structures of its kind in the United States, and a symbol of the city's high culture and modernity just decades after it was founded as a small collection of log cabins. The second story of the building consisted of an open-air gazebo used as a stage for public speeches and concerts by the Goodman Band. Sitting in the middle of the square as it was, increasing automobile traffic flowing through downtown Decatur on US 51 was forced to circle around the structure, and the Transfer House came to be seen by some as an impediment. The Illinois Department of Transportation, who maintained the US 51 highway route through Decatur, requested it be removed, and in 1962, the structure was transported by truck to nearby Central Park, where it stands today. In that location, it has served as a bus shelter, a visitor information center, and civic group offices.

The Edward P. Irving House, designed by Frank Lloyd Wright and built in 1911, is located at No. 2 Millikin Place, Decatur. In addition, the Robert Mueller Residence, 1 Millikin Place, and the Adolph Mueller Residence, 4 Millikin Place, have been attributed to Wright's assistants Hermann V. von Holst and Marion Mahony.

=== Library ===
In 1901 Andrew Carnegie gave the City of Decatur $60,000 to construct a new public library. The library was built in 1902 at the corner of Eldorado and Main and opened to the public July 1, 1903. The building served the community until 1970 when the library moved to North Street at the site of a former Sears, Roebuck & Co. store. In 1999 the library moved to its present location on Franklin Street, which is also an abandoned Sears building. The library is part of the Illinois Heartland Library System. The original Carnegie library building was razed in 1972 and in its place a bank was built.

== Infrastructure ==
In 1914, a water filtration plant was commissioned, which was subsequently constructed by the New York Continental Jewell Filtration Company.

Waste management was in part managed via the 1940s era Rhodes Landfill, which was closed by court order in 1992.

=== Parks and recreation ===
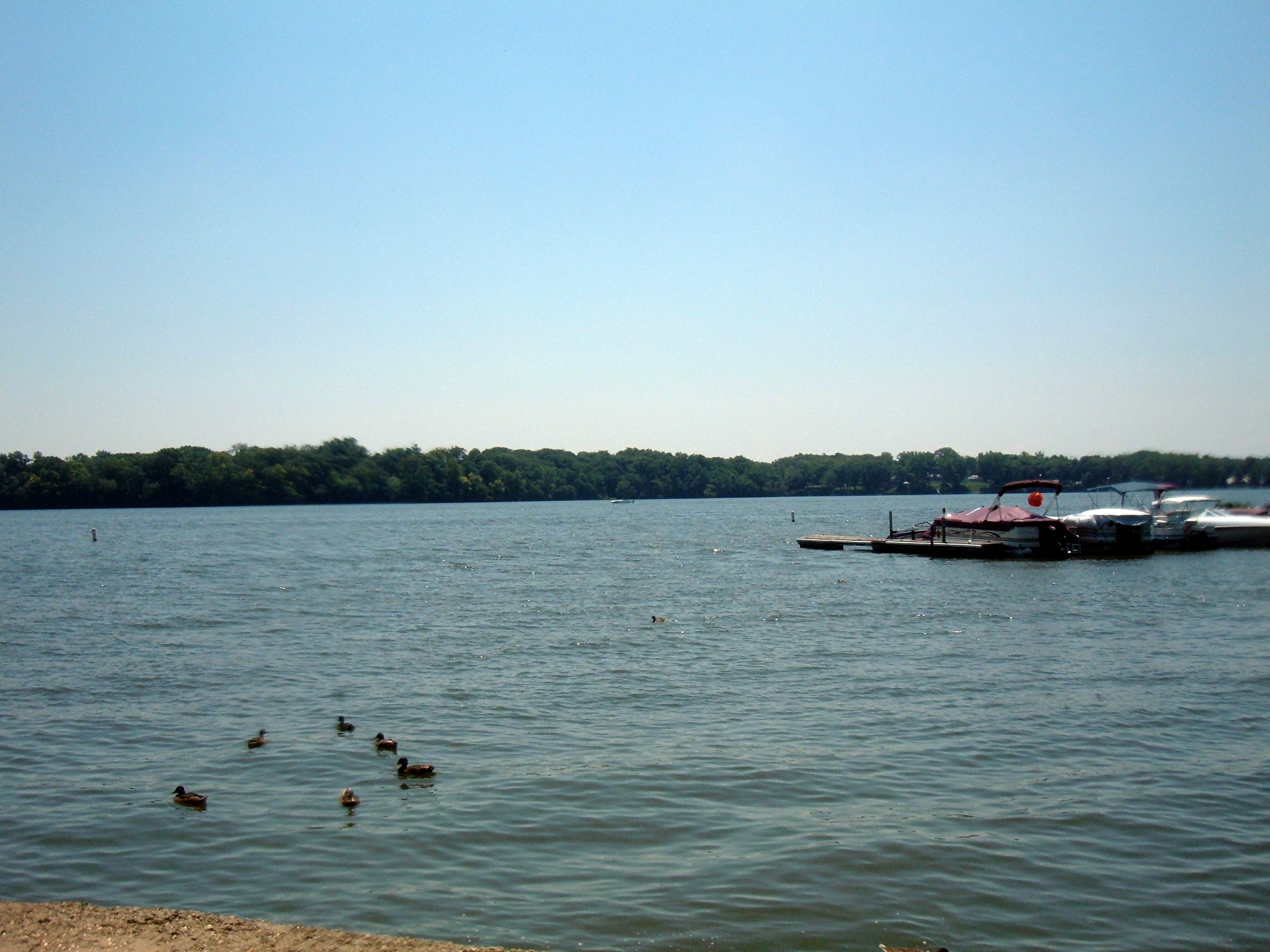
Nelson Park

Local Macon County park resources include Lake Decatur, Lincoln Trail Homestead State Memorial, Rock Springs Conservation Area, Fort Daniel Conservation Area, Sand Creek Recreation Area, Griswold Conservation Area, Friends Creek Regional Park, and Spitler Woods State Natural Area. The Decatur Park District resources include 2,000 acres (810 ha) of park land, an indoor sports center, Decatur Airport, three golf courses, softball, soccer and tennis complexes, athletic fields, a community aquatic center, an AZA-accredited zoo, and a banquet, food and beverage business. Decatur was once dubbed "Park City USA" because it had more parks per person than any other city in the country, as well as "Playtown USA" because of Decatur's position as an early national leader in providing recreational space for its citizens. A motion picture short by that name was made in 1944 that featured the city's recreational efforts.

=== Transportation ===
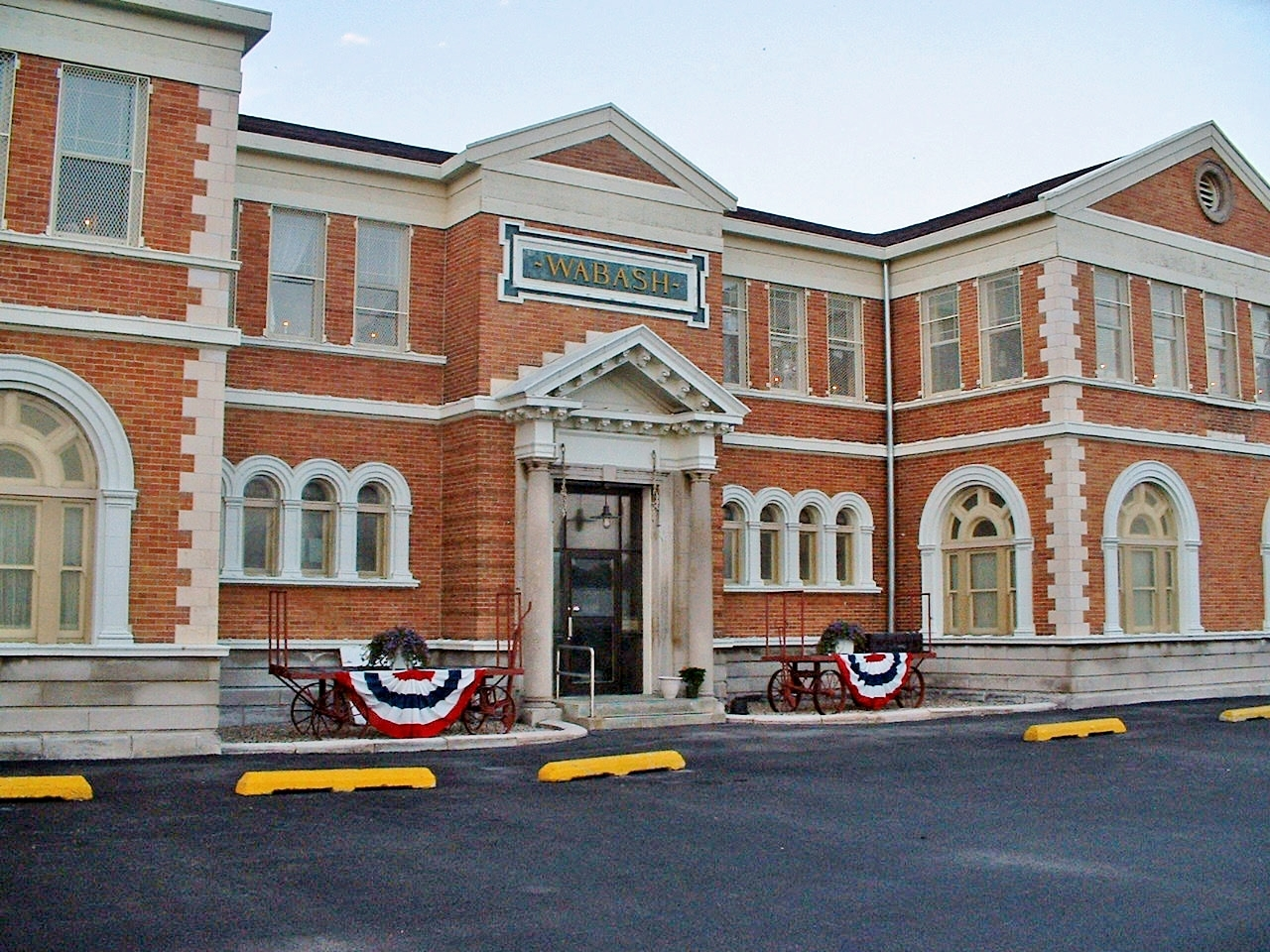
Decatur station was served by the Wabash Railroad

Decatur Airport is served by daily commercial flights to and from Chicago-O'Hare International Airport by United Airlines.

For more than 100 years, Decatur has been a major railroad junction and was once served by seven railroads. After mergers and consolidations, it is now served by two Class I railroads: Canadian National and Norfolk Southern. The city is also served by Decatur Junction Railway, Decatur Central Railroad and Decatur & Eastern Illinois Railroad shortlines.

Interstate 72, U.S. Route 51, U.S. Route 36, Illinois Route 48, Illinois Route 105, and Illinois Route 121 are key highway links for the area.

The Decatur Public Transit System (DPTS) provides fixed-route bus service as well as complementary door-to-door paratransit service for people with disabilities, who are unable to use the bus system, throughout the City of Decatur. Under an agreement with the Village of Forsyth, service is also provided to the Hickory Point Mall area in Forsyth.

== Sports ==
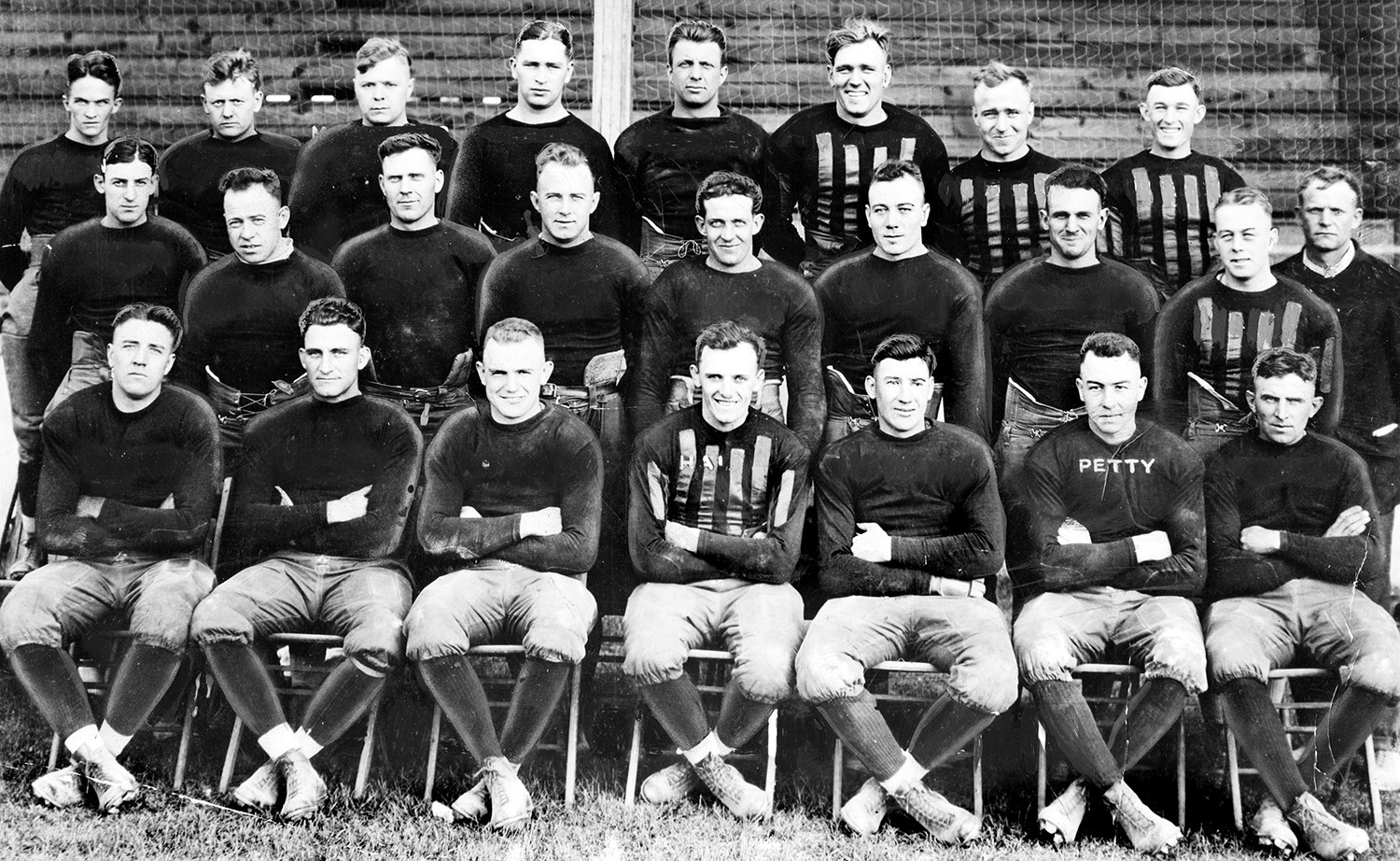
1920 Decatur Staleys

Decatur was the original home of the Chicago Bears, from 1919 to 1920. The football team was then known as the Decatur Staleys and played at Staley Field, both named after the local food-products manufacturer. A.E. Staley created the team from regular Staley Processing employees who had an interest in the sport. As the team continued to win games and show promise, Staley decided to invest in the team further by hiring George Halas as its second head coach. Halas led the team to success in the 1920 season, going 10–1–2. As the team continued to win, Staley realized that he could make more money and further develop the team if there were larger crowds and a larger venue to play at. Halas and Staley agreed to move the team to Chicago in 1921 and play at Wrigley Field. The team was to play one season as the Chicago Staleys. In 1922, they played their first season as the Chicago Bears.

From 1900 to 1974, Decatur was the home of the Commodores, a minor-league baseball team playing at Fans Field.

The USTA/Ursula Beck Pro Tennis Classic has been held annually since 1999. Male players from over 20 countries compete for $25,000 in prize money as well as ATP world ranking points at the Fairview Park Tennis Complex. The tournament is held for eight consecutive days at Fairview Park concluding on the first weekend in August.

Decatur formerly hosted the annual Decatur-Forsyth Classic presented by Tate & Lyle and the Decatur Park District. The tournament was traditionally held in June. The final year for the tournament was 2019.

== Government ==
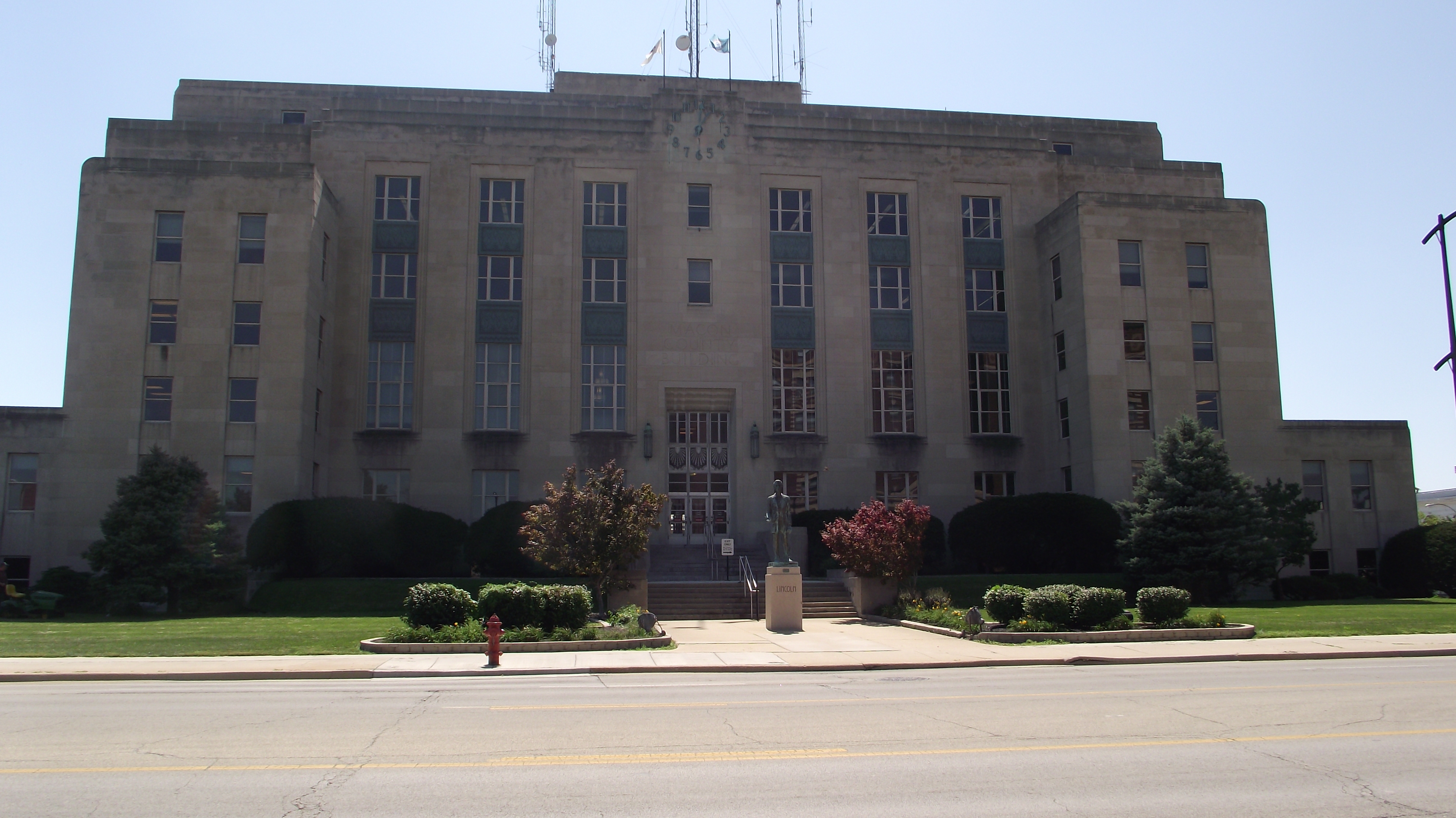
Macon County Courthouse

Between 1829 and 1836, the County Commissioners Court had jurisdiction as it was the seat of Macon County. By 1836 the population reached approximately 300, and Richard Oglesby was elected president of the first board of trustees. Other members of the board of trustees included Dr. William Crissey, H.M. Gorin and Andrew Love as clerk.

In 1839 a town charter was granted to Decatur that gave power to the trustees "to establish and regulate a fire department, to dig wells and erect pumps in the streets, regulate police of the town, [and] raise money for the purpose of commencing and prosecuting works of public improvement." Those who served as president of the town of Decatur were: Richard Oglesby (1836), Joseph Williams (1837), Henry Snyder (1838), Kirby Benedict (1839), Joseph King (1840), Thomas P. Rodgers (1841), David Crone (1846–47), J.H. Elliott (1848), Joseph Kauffman (1849), Joseph King (1850), William S. Crissey (1851), W.J. Stamper (1852), William Prather (1853–54), and Thomas H. Wingate (1854–55).

In the winter of 1855–56, a special city incorporation charter was obtained. This charter provided an aldermanic form of government and on January 7, 1856, an election was held for mayor, two aldermen for each of the four wards, and city marshal. This aldermanic form of government continued until January 18, 1911, when Decatur changed to city commissioner form of government. The new commissioner system provided a mayor elected at-large and four commissioners to serve as administrators of city services: accounts and finance, public health and safety, public property, and streets and public improvements. The mayor also served as Commissioner of Public Affairs.

The mayor and commissioner system prevailed until a special election on November 25, 1958, in which the present council-manager form of government was adopted. According to the city website, the "City of Decatur operates under the Council-Manager form of government, a system which combines the leadership of a representative, elected council with the professional background of an appointed manager." The mayor and all members of the council are elected at-large. Their duties include determining city policy and representing the city in public ceremonies, for which they receive nominal annual salaries. The appointed manager handles all city administration and is the council's employee, not an elected official. Since 1959, the following have served as City Managers: John E. Dever, W. Robert Semple, Leslie T. Allen, Jim Bacon, Jim Williams, Steve Garman, John A. Smith (acting), Ryan McCrady, Gregg Zientara (interim), Timothy Gleason, and Scot Wrighton, the current holder.

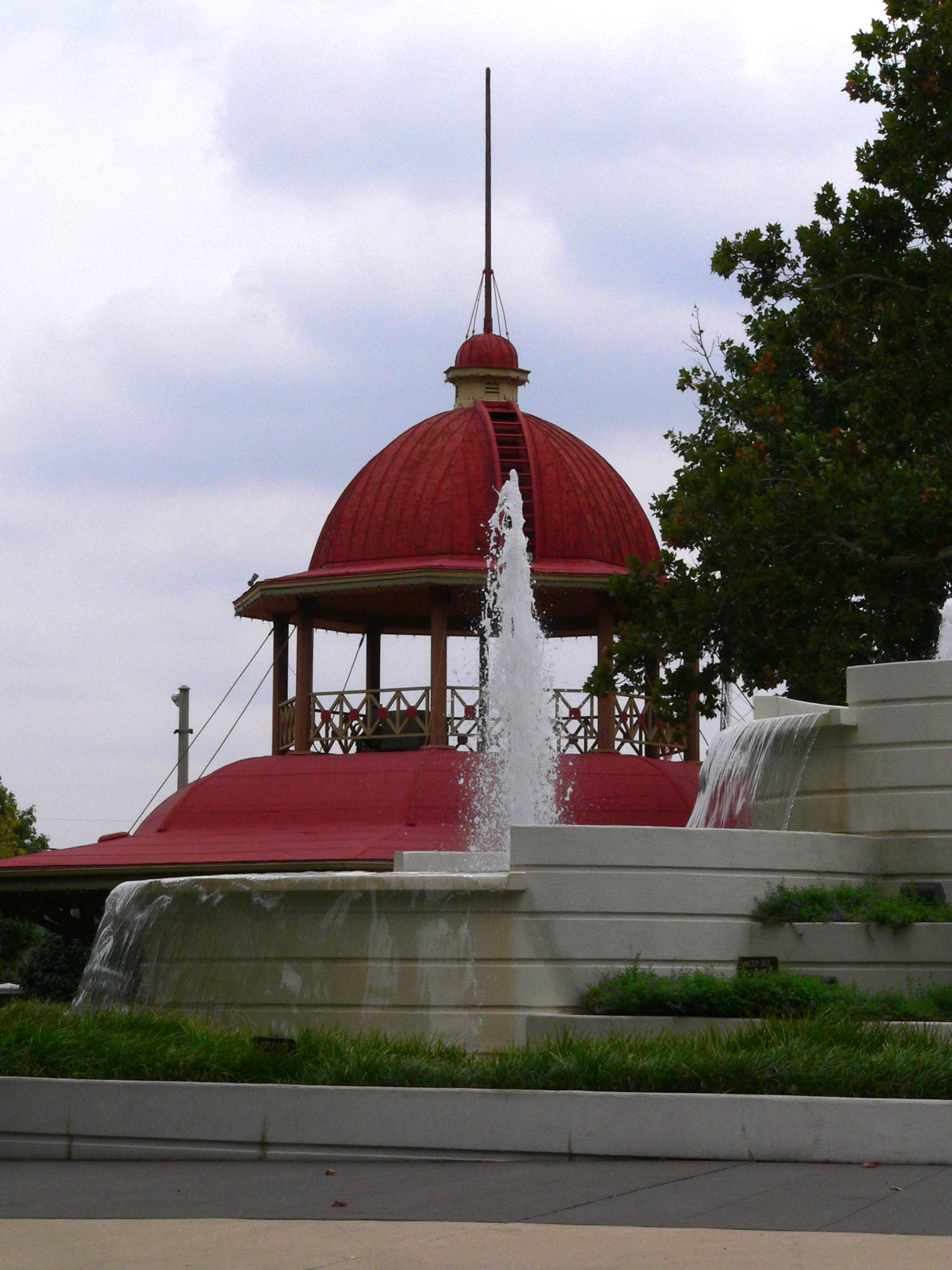
The Decatur Transfer House in the background in downtown's Central Park

Julie Moore Wolfe serves as the current mayor of Decatur. Moore Wolfe was appointed unanimously by the Decatur City Council following the death of Mayor Mike McElroy. She is the first female to be mayor of Decatur. Moore Wolfe, who had been appointed mayor pro tem in May 2015, became acting mayor after McElroy died on July 17, 2015. McElroy had been mayor since 2009 and had recently been re-elected to a second term as mayor in April 2015. Moore Wolfe was elected to a four-year term as mayor on April 4, 2017.

=== Mayors ===
Those who served as president of the town of Decatur were: Richard Oglesby (1836), Joseph Williams (1837), Henry Snyder (1838), Kirby Benedict (1839), Joseph King (1840), Thomas P. Rodgers (1841), David Crone (1846–47), J.H. Elliott (1848), Joseph Kauffman (1849), Joseph King (1850), William S. Crissey (1851), W.J. Stamper (1852), William Prather (1853–54), and Thomas H. Wingate (1854–55).

During the winter of 1855–56, a special incorporation charter of Decatur as a city was obtained providing for an aldermanic form of government.

- John P. Post (1856)
- William A. Barnes (1857)
- James Shoaff (1858)
- Alexander T. Hill (1859)
- Sheridan Wait (1860)
- Edward O. Smith (1861)
- Thomas O. Smith (1862)
- Jasper J. Peddecord (1863–1864)
- Franklin Priest (1865–66; 1870, 1874, 1878)
- John K. Warren (1867)
- Isaac C. Pugh (1868)
- William L. Hammer (1869)
- E.M. Misner (1871)
- D.S. Shellabarger (1872)
- Martin Forstmeyer (1873)
- R.H. Merriweather (1875)
- William B. Chambers (1876–1877; 1883–1884; 1891–1892)
- Lysander L. Haworth (1879)
- Henry W. Waggoner (1880–1882)
- Michael F. Kanan (1885–1890)
- David C. Moffitt (1893–1894)
- D.H. Conklin (1895–1896)
- B.Z. Taylor (1897–1898)
- George A. Stadler (1899–1900)
- Charles F. Shilling (1901–1904)
- George L. Lehman (1905–1906),
- E.S. McDonald (1907–1908)
- Charles M. Borchers (1909–1911; 1919–1923)
- Dan Dinneen (1911–1919)
- Elmer R. Elder (1923–1927)
- Orpheus W. Smith (1927–1935)
- Harry E. Barber (1935)
- Charles E. Lee (1936–1943)
- James A. Hedrick (1943–51)
- Dr. Robert E. Willis (1951–1955)
- Clarence A. Sablotny (1955–59)
- Jack W. Loftus, acting (1959)
- Robert A. Grohne (1959–1963)
- Ellis B. Arnold (May 1, 1963, to April 30, 1967)
- James H. Rupp (1966–1977)
- Elmer W. Walton (1977–1983)
- Gary K. Anderson (1983–1992)
- Erik Brechnitz (1992–1995)
- Terry M. Howley (1995–2003)
- Paul Osborne (2003–2008) (resigned)
- Mike Carrigan (2008–2009) (appointed)
- Mike McElroy (2009–2015)
- Julie Moore Wolfe (2015–present) (appointed 2015, elected 2017)

== Education ==
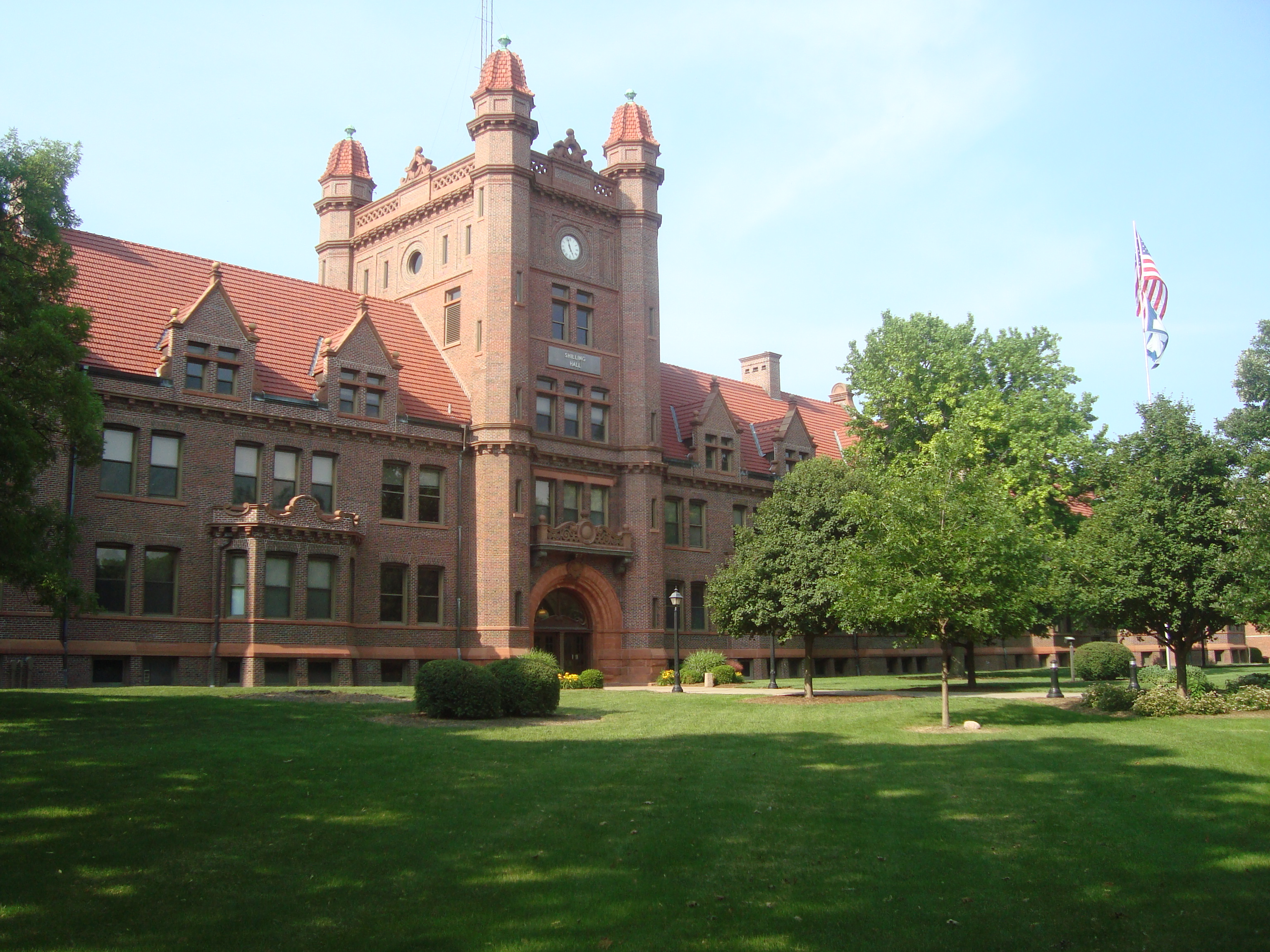
Schilling Hall at Millikin University

=== Colleges ===
- Millikin University (enrollment ~1,800), a private university with a 75-acre (30 ha) campus founded by James Millikin and affiliated with the Presbyterian Church (U.S.A.).
- Richland Community College (enrollment 3,500) is a comprehensive community college. It also hosts the biannual Farm Progress Show.

=== Public schools ===
K–12 public education in the majority of the Decatur city limits is provided by the Decatur Public Schools District 61. High school athletics have been a member of the Central State Eight Conference since 2014–15.

High schools

- Eisenhower High School
- MacArthur High School
- William Harris Learning Academy

Elementary schools and K-8 schools

- American Dreamer STEM Academy
- Baum Elementary School
- Dennis Lab School
- Franklin Grove Elementary School
- Hope Academy
- Johns Hill Magnet School
- Montessori Academy for Peace
- Muffley Elementary School
- Parsons Elementary School
- Pershing Early Learning Center
- South Shores Elementary School
- Stephen Decatur Middle School
- William Harris Learning Academy

Pieces of the Decatur city limits extend into other school districts. They are: They are: Warrensburg-Latham Community Unit District 11, Maroa-Forsyth Community Unit School District 2, Argenta-Oreana Community Unit School District 1, Meridian Community Unit School District 15, Sangamon Valley Community Unit School District 9, Mount Zion Community Unit School District 3, and Cerro Gordo Community Unit School District 100.

=== Private schools ===
==== High schools ====
- Unity Christian School
- St. Teresa High School

==== Primary schools ====
- Antioch Christian Academy
- Holy Family Catholic School
- Unity Christian School
- Our Lady of Lourdes School
- St. Patrick School

==== PreK-12 ====
- Decatur Christian School (Forsyth, Illinois)

== Media ==
=== Newspapers ===
- Decatur Tribune —weekly
- The Decaturian —bi-weekly student newspaper published by Millikin University
- Herald & Review —daily owned by Lee Enterprises

=== Magazines ===
- Decatur Magazine —bi-monthly

=== Television ===
- 17 WAND, NBC
- 23 WBUI, CW

=== AM radio ===
- WDZ —1050AM—ESPN Radio
- WSOY—1340AM —talk radio
- 1650 AM —Community

=== FM radio ===
- WBGL —88.1 FM —Christian radio
- WDCR (FM) —88.9 FM & 96.5 FM —Relevant Radio
- WJMU —89.5 FM —Millikin University —alternative rock
- WYDS —93.1 FM —top 40
- WDZQ —95.1 FM —country music
- WXFM —99.3 —Light Hits
- WZUS —100.9 FM —talk radio
- WLUJ — 101.9 FM – Moody Christian Radio
- WSOY —102.9 FM —Top 40
- WEJT —105.1 FM —adult hits
- WKIO —105.5 FM —classic rock
- WZNX —106.7 FM —classic rock
- WDKR —107.3 —oldies

== State government facilities ==
Decatur Correctional Center, a prison for women, is in the city.

== In popular culture ==
Decatur has been mentioned in several movies, including the 1984 movie Bachelor Party, the 1986 movie Ferris Bueller's Day Off, and the 2008 movie Leatherheads. The eclectic folk artist Sufjan Stevens included a song on his 2005 album Illinois called "Decatur, or, Round of Applause for Your Stepmother!"

Decatur was also the primary location for the filming of The Informant!, starring Matt Damon. The movie was centered around a scandal which occurred at Archer Daniels Midland in the 1990s.

== Sister cities ==
Decatur's sister cities are:

- Tokorozawa, Japan (since 1966)
- Seevetal, Germany (since 1975)

The Decatur Sister Cities Committee annually coordinates both inbound and outbound high school students, who serve as ambassadors among the three cities.

== See also ==
Roosevelt Junior High Historic school in Decatur. Fans Field Miinor-League Baseball park, which has since been demolished.
