= Decatur Airport =

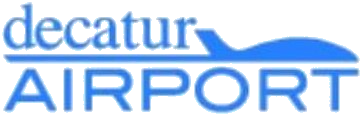
- IATA: DEC; ICAO: KDEC; FAA LID: DEC

Summary
- Airport type: Public
- Owner: Decatur Park District
- Serves: Decatur, Illinois
- Elevation AMSL: 682 ft (208 m)
- Coordinates: 39°50′04″N 088°51′56″W
- Public transit access: DPTS
- Website: https://decatur-parks.org/decatur-airport/

Maps
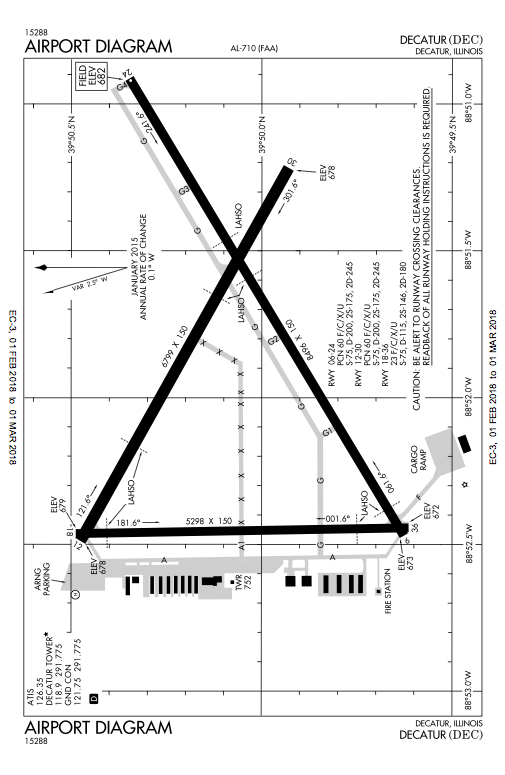
- FAA diagram (February 2018)
- Interactive map of Decatur Airport

Runways
Direction	Length		Surface
Direction	ft	m	Surface
6/24	8,496	2,590	Asphalt/concrete
12/30	6,799	2,072	Asphalt/concrete
18/36	5,298	1,615	Asphalt

Statistics
- Aircraft operations (2020): 29,285
- Based aircraft (2022): 62
- Source: Federal Aviation Administration

Decatur Airport (IATA: DEC, ICAO: KDEC, FAA LID: DEC) is a public airport five miles east of Decatur, in Macon County, Illinois, United States. The airport is owned by the Decatur Park District. Airline service is subsidized by the federal government's Essential Air Service program at a cost of $6,120,951 (per year).

The Federal Aviation Administration (FAA) National Plan of Integrated Airport Systems for 2021–2025 categorized it as a regional general aviation facility.

It is the eleventh busiest of the 12 commercial airports in Illinois.

== Facilities and aircraft ==
Decatur Airport covers 2,100 acres (850 ha) at an elevation of 682 feet (208 m). It has three runways: 6/24 is 8,496 by 150 feet (2,590 x 46 m) asphalt/concrete; 12/30 is 6,799 by 150 feet (2,072 x 46 m) asphalt/concrete; 18/36 is 5,298 by 150 feet (1,615 x 46 m) asphalt.

In the 12-month period ending December 31, 2020, the airport had 29,285 aircraft operations, an average of 80 per day: 78% general aviation, 15% military, 4% air taxi and 3% commercial airline. In April 2022, there were 62 aircraft based at this airport: 50 single-engine airplanes and 12 military.

Decatur Airport has a 24,000 square feet (2,200 m^{2}) passenger terminal with airline counters, a restaurant, baggage claim area, and car rental counters.

The Illinois Army National Guard has an Army Aviation Support Facility (AASF) at the airport. The facility occupies 10 acres (4.0 ha) and has three permanent buildings and a temporary building on the site.

== Airline and destination ==
Airlines	Destinations
United Express	Chicago–O'Hare

Destinations map
Destinations from Decatur Airport
Red = Year-round destination
Green = Seasonal destination
Blue = Future destination

== Ground transportation ==
Public transit service to the airport is provided by Decatur Public Transit System. Route 12 operates Monday through Saturday from downtown Decatur to the airport, while Route 3 serves the airport on Sundays.

Decatur Airport has an Avis Car Rental branch on-site.

== Accidents and incidents ==
- On August 3, 1950, a United States Air Force Douglas C-47D was destroyed by fire after a take-off related accident. All five occupants survived the crash and subsequent fire.
- On October 2, 2006 a United States Air Force Learjet C-21A was on a training mission flying a simulated approach when speed unexpectedly dropped and called out "speed" two times. The pilot pulled back the number one engine throttle but the plane began to roll steeply to the right and struck the pavement before proceeding to skid through a grass infield and then across another runway before coming to a stop. Both occupants survived.
- On December 2, 2010, a single-engine home-built aircraft, a Southerland Freebird Litesport Ultra, took off from Decatur Airport and crashed 1.5 miles east of the airport. The pilot was the only person on board and was killed in the crash. The National Transportation Safety Board determined that the probable cause of the accident was "the pilot's reported inability to control his amateur-built airplane for undetermined reasons after the airplane inadvertently became airborne while conducting a high-speed taxi."

== See also ==
- List of airports in Illinois

== Other sources ==
- Essential Air Service documents (Docket OST-2006-23929) from the U.S. Department of Transportation:
  - Order 2006-4-24: selecting RegionsAir, Inc., d/b/a American Connection, to provide essential air service at Decatur, Illinois, for a two-year period at a subsidy rate of $1,242,250 annually.
  - Order 2007-4-12: selecting Great Lakes Aviation, Ltd., to provide essential air service at Decatur, Illinois, for a two-year period at subsidies of $1,350,256 for the first year and $1,055,844 for the second year.
  - Order 2009-10-13: selecting Hyannis Air Service, Inc. d/b/a Cape Air, to provide subsidized essential air service (EAS) at Marion/Herrin, Quincy, and Cape Girardeau, for a two-year period beginning when Cape Air inaugurates full EAS at each of the three communities and ending at the close of the 24th month thereafter, at a combined annual subsidy rate of $5,469,768 ($2,053,783 for Marion/Herrin, $1,946,270 for Quincy, and $1,469,715 for Cape Girardeau). The Department is selecting Multi-Aero, Inc. d/b/a Air Choice One to provide subsidized EAS at Decatur, Illinois, and Burlington, Iowa, for a two-year period beginning when it inaugurates full EAS and ending at the close of the 24th month thereafter, at a combined annual subsidy of $5,253,644 ($3,082,403 for Decatur and $2,171,241 for Burlington). The Department is selecting Great Lakes Aviation, Ltd. (Great Lakes) to provide subsidized EAS at Fort Leonard Wood, Missouri, for the two-year period from November 1, 2009, through October 31, 2011, at an annual subsidy of $1,292,906.
  - Order 2011-12-17: re-selecting Multi-Aero, Inc. d/b/a Air Choice One to provide essential air service (EAS) at Burlington, Iowa, and Decatur, Illinois, at a combined annual subsidy rate of $4,727,307 ($1,976,872 for Burlington and $2,750,435 for Decatur), for a one-year period from February 1, 2012, through January 31, 2013.
