= Lake Decatur =

- Location within Illinois Location within the United States
- Location: Decatur, Illinois
- Coordinates: 39°49′N 88°56′W
- Lake type: Reservoir
- Primary inflows: north Upper Sangamon watershed
- Primary outflows: Sangamon River
- Catchment area: 925 sq mi (2,396 km^{2})
- Basin countries: United States
- Surface area: 4.2 sq mi (11 km^{2})
- Average depth: 7.9 ft (2.4 m)
- Water volume: 21,000 acre⋅ft (0.026 km^{3})
- Shore length^{1}: 30 mi (48 km) (1922)
- Surface elevation: 613 ft (187 m)
- ^{1} Shore length is not a well-defined measure.

Lake Decatur is a 2,800-acre (11 km^{2}) reservoir located in the city of Decatur, Illinois, USA, east of downtown. The city and lake both share the name of U.S. Navy Commodore Stephen Decatur. The lake is 613 feet (187 m) above sea level and has a watershed of 925 square miles (2,400 km^{2}) or 592,000 acres (240,000 ha) reaching into parts of seven counties. The largest lake on the Sangamon River, it was created in 1920–1922.

== History ==
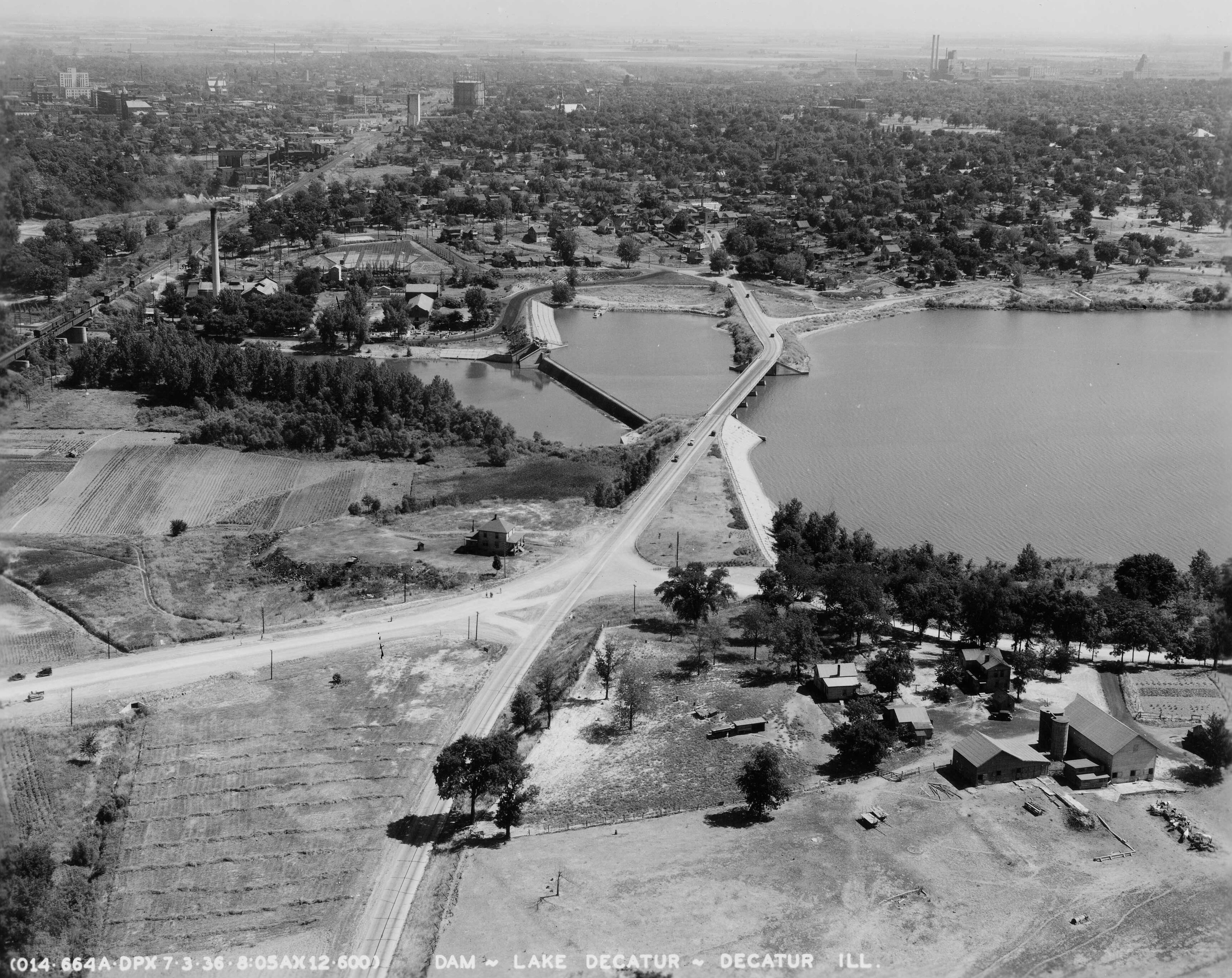
Dam of Lake Decatur, 1936

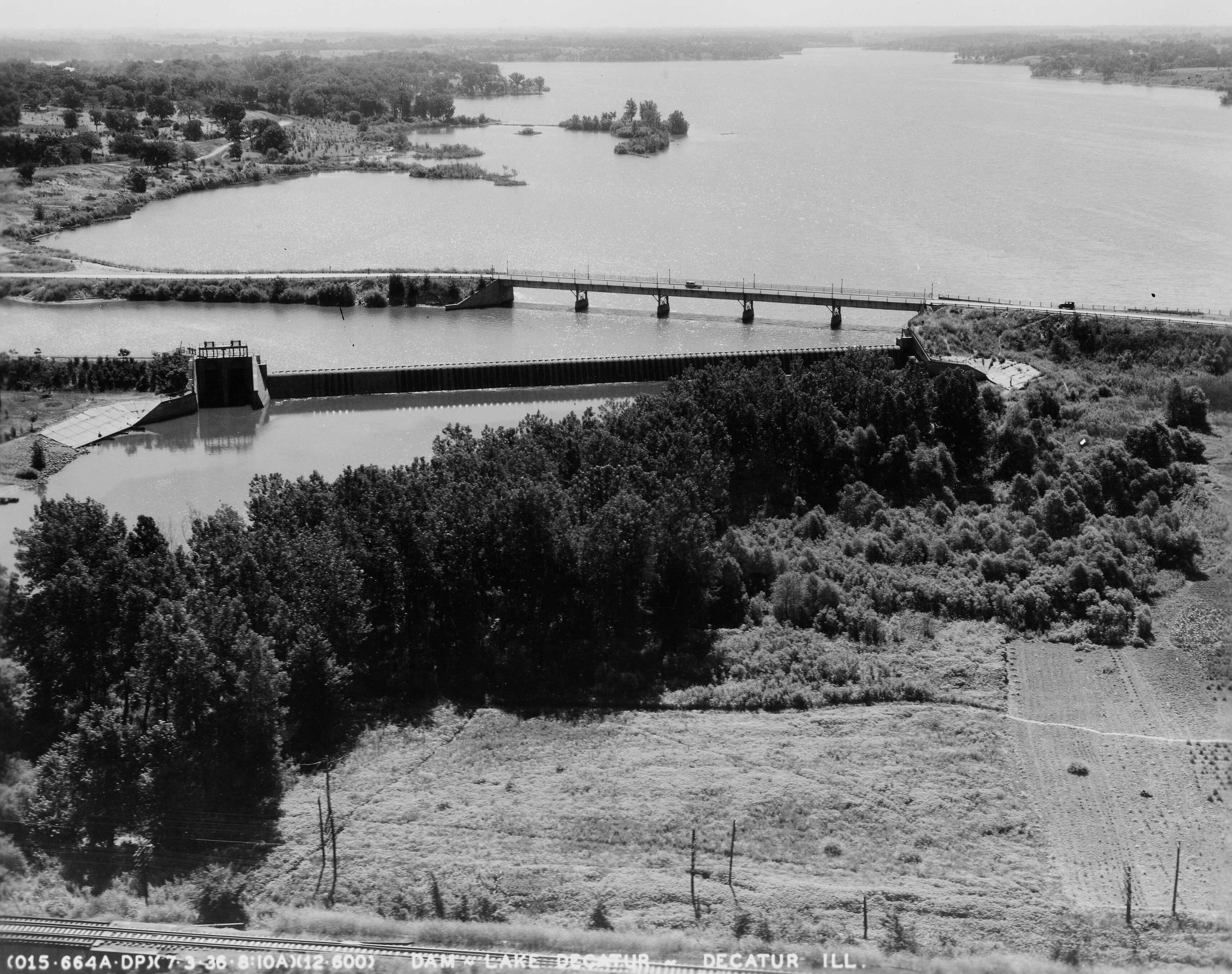
Dam of Lake Decatur, 1936

The lake was constructed as a source of water for Decatur, especially the local corn refining industry. The corn refiner A.E. Staley led the campaign to persuade Decatur to borrow the $2.0 million necessary for the project. Staley was not being altruistic; corn wet-milling, which Staley's successor firm, Tate & Lyle, and its local competitor, Archer Daniels Midland, carry on to this day, is a water-intensive industrial process. Lake Decatur water is also used in the process of refining corn into ethanol. In 2007, about 76 percent of Lake Decatur's water was used for commercial and industrial purposes.

As the largest artificial lake in Illinois at the time of construction, with a 30-mile (48 km) shoreline, Lake Decatur became a focus of Mid-Illinois recreation. The invention of the gasoline-powered speedboat had made sheltered reservoir waters attractive to many inland Americans.

== Today ==
In the years since its completion in 1922, the aging Lake Decatur has suffered from extensive siltation problems. It was designed to sit atop relatively flat prairie land and is vulnerable to deposits of silt eroded from farm fields in the 925-square-mile (2,396 km^{2}) upper Sangamon River drainage area. From 1923 to 1983, Lake Decatur lost an estimated 35% of its designed storage volume. Although this trend has since been slowed by ongoing dredging, in 2004, Lake Decatur was described as having an average depth of only 8 feet (2.4 m).

2008 rainfall replenished lake levels although the dredging operations have failed to stem the loss of reservoir storage capacity. City officials considered, but ultimately decided against, constructing a second reservoir for water storage purposes. In 2018, The City of Decatur completed a four-year long, $91 million dredging effort that increased the storage capacity of the lake by 30%.

Lake Decatur borders two of Decatur's largest parks, Faries Park and Nelson Park, as well as Scovill Zoo. The Decatur Park District was founded in 1924 to take advantage of the opportunities arising from the creation of the lake.

Lake Decatur can be seen from U.S. Highway 36, which crosses the lake on a causeway bridge located on Decatur's southeast side. U.S. Route 51 also crosses the lake on the south side of the city.

City registration is required to boat on the lake and day passes can be purchased in the Lake Patrol office in Nelson Park, which can also provide maps to the lake, along with rules information and fishing regulations. The Lake Patrol office is only open during regular business hours on weekdays in off-peak months but is staffed 24/7 during peak summer months. Many people fish on the lake, catching bass, crappie and walleye. There are five public boat ramps located in Nelson Park, Faries Park, at the Sportsman's Club, on Lost Bridge and Country Club Roads.

Currently, the lake has five crossings: Reas Bridge Road, William Street (Illinois 105), US 36/Illinois 121, Lost Bridge Road and US 51/Illinois 105.

== See also ==
- Sangamon River
