= Macon County Courthouse (Illinois) =

Local government building in the United States

Coordinates: 39°50′24″N 88°57′14″W

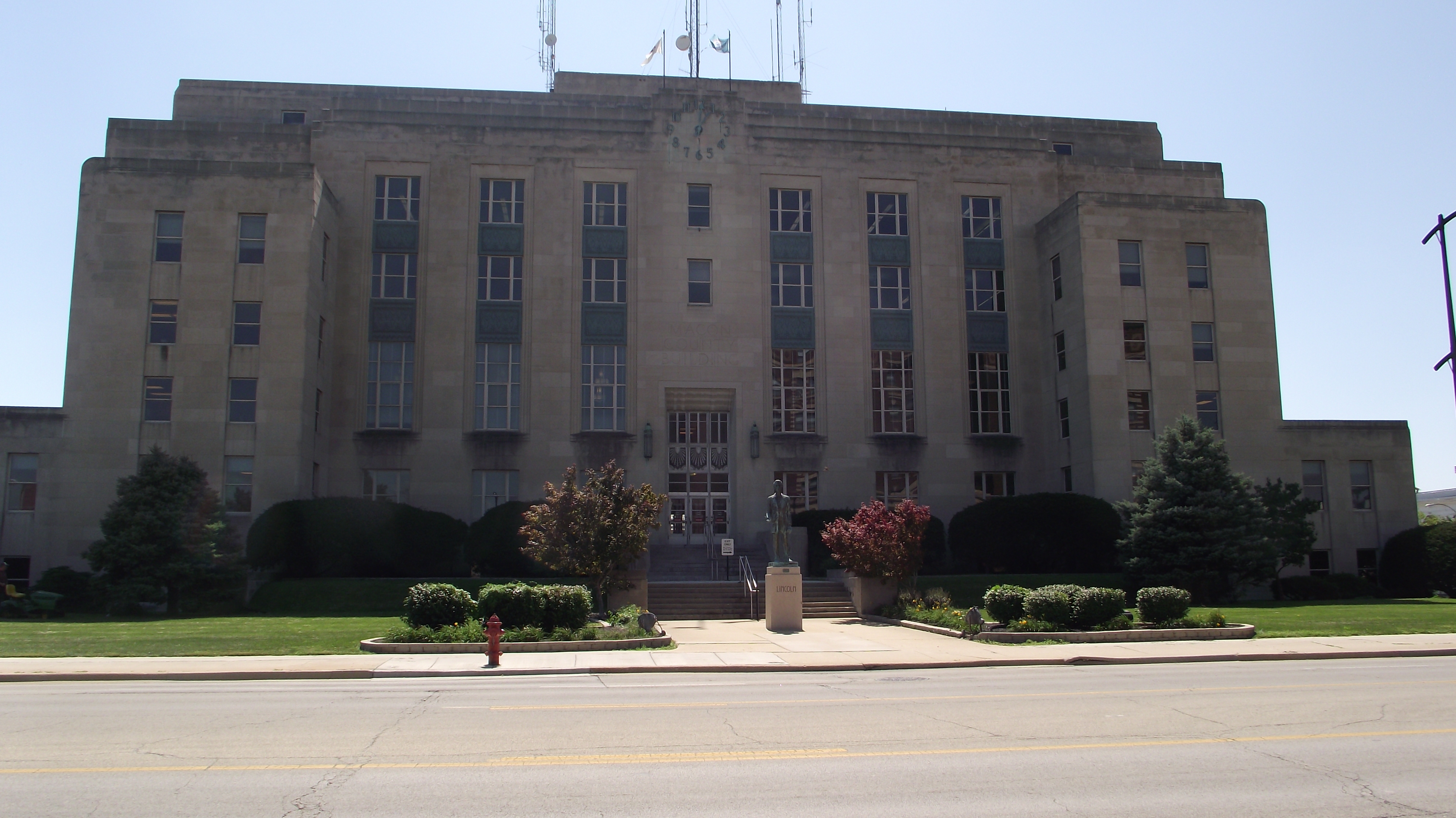
Facade

The Macon County Courthouse is a government building in Decatur, the county seat of Macon County, Illinois, United States. Completed in 1940, it is the fourth courthouse in the county's history.

== Early history ==
The area now composing Macon County was uninhabited until about 1820, when a Vandalia resident settled along the Sangamon River, and further settlement was extremely sparse until 1828. As the area's population began growing, the General Assembly created Macon County out of Shelby County in early 1829, and a commission named to ascertain a location for the county seat chose the location that became the city of Decatur. Land sales in the newly platted town began in July, and the first court in the county met in August at the home of James Ward, about 4 miles (6.4 km) south of Decatur.

== First courthouse ==
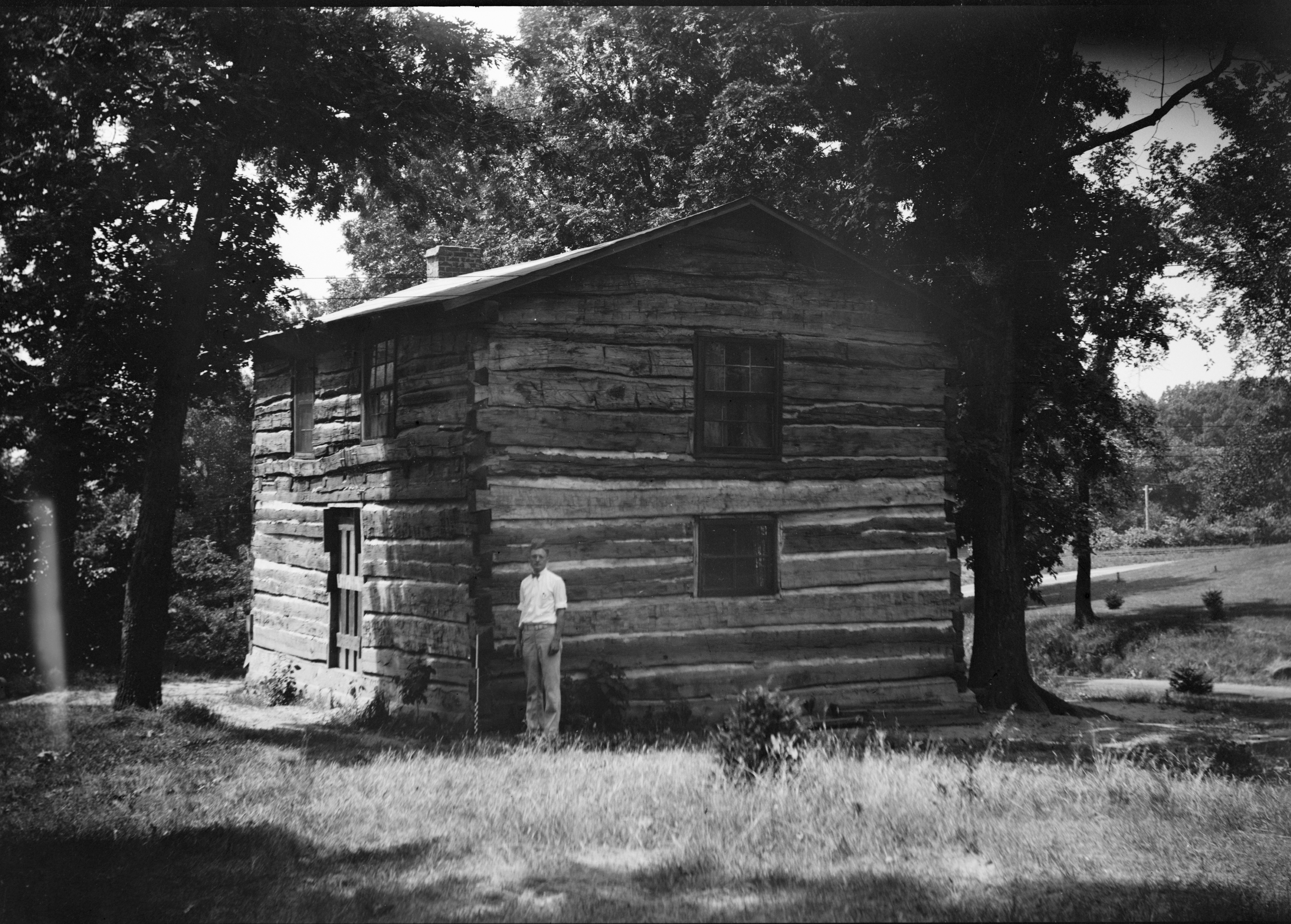
Original courthouse, seen in 1935

When the county was formed, a rude log building was soon erected to serve as the first courthouse. Measuring 18 by 24 by 20 feet (5.5 m × 7.3 m × 6.1 m), it was used as a courthouse during the week, and it was available for churches to use on weekends. Having outgrown the building, county officials ordered the construction of a two-story brick building 40 by 40 feet (12 m × 12 m) in 1837, and they sold the original to a farmer who moved it to his property. In the 1890s, the owner donated it to a local historical organization, and it has since been used as a museum.

== Later courthouses ==
The second courthouse featured a hip roof with a cupola at the center, and a small bell tower sat atop the cupola. Five rectangular windows and a rounded door pierced each of the sides. It remained in use until 1891, when a replacement was completed. The new limestone building featured a corner tower and exhibited the Romanesque Revival style, and it was used both by the city and the county. This arrangement continued until 1940, when the present Art Deco building was completed by the federal Works Progress Administration. Five stories tall with an irregular plan, it is entered by a central second-story set of doors. A minimalist public clock is perched above the main entrance, immediately below the edge of the roof.
