= Scovill Zoo =

Coordinates: 39°49′44″N 88°54′24″W

- Interactive map of Scovill Zoo
- Date opened: 1967
- Location: Decatur, Illinois, United States
- No. of animals: 400
- No. of species: 96
- Memberships: AZA, AAZK
- Public transit: DPTS
- Website: scovillzoo.com

Scovill Zoo in Decatur, Illinois, is one of 210 zoos accredited by the Association of Zoos and Aquariums with 96 species spanning six continents and around 500 animals in residence. The zoo originally started out as a farm in 1967 when the Kiwanis Club donated money for its construction. Scovill Zoo has its own chapter of the AAZK or American Association of Zoo Keepers. The zoo participates in a large number of conservation projects and education.

== History ==
In 1947, Guy Norman and Rose Scovill donated the property for Scovill Gardens (which now include the Scovill Zoo) to the Decatur Park District.

The zoo first opened to the public in Decatur, Illinois in 1967 under the name of Scovill Farm. The Kiwanis Club had donated $14,000 to begin building the farm; initially it housed pigs, chickens, goats, and other farm animals. Additional donations were obtained to cover construction costs, which totaled $56,000.

Scovill Zoo, as it is now called, houses hundreds of animals from nearly one hundred species including cheetahs, gray wolves, zebras, and alligators, along with the original farm animals. On September 25, 2006, Scovill Zoo became one of 210 zoos recognized by the Association of Zoos and Aquariums. In the spring of 2007, Scovill Zoo created a local chapter of the AAZK or American Association of Zoo Keepers to further education.

== Conservation projects ==
Scovill Zoo places great emphasis on conservation through education and donation of funds to support organizations working to conserve both animal populations as well as the environment.

=== AAZK chapter ===
The American Association of Zoo Keepers was formed in 1967 in San Diego, California. It serves as an educational opportunity for zookeepers to learn from one another and continue education. Scovill Zoo formed its own chapter in 2007. The chapter aids in conservation projects such as Bowling for Rhinos, golden lion tamarin of Brazil conservation, De Wildt Cheetah and Wildlife Trust, and the Snow Leopard Trust.

=== Cheetah conservation ===
Scovill Zoo's two African cheetahs, Jafari and Runako, were born in Africa before coming to live at Scovill Zoo. Due to threats to their habitat as well as other factors, cheetahs have been placed on the list of threatened species. Scovill Zoo is doing its part to help cheetahs survive by donating five cents of each paid zoo admission. The money collected goes to the De Wildt Cheetah and Wildlife Conservation Centre.
The money raised by admissions goes to the organization's census study of free-roaming cheetahs in South Africa. The organization uses radio collars and survey farmers to try to gain a better grasp on the number of cheetahs still roaming Africa. With more information, the organization hopes to be able to learn more about where the cheetahs are and help cheetahs and humans coexist more peacefully.

=== Save a Rainforest ===
By donating to the Conservation Parking Meter, set up by the Center for Ecosystem Survival, at Scovill Zoo, guests are able to give money to the Rincon Rainforest, which is 13,838 acres (56.00 km^{2}) along the north edge of the eastern part of the Area de Conservacion Guanacaste, in Costa Rica.

== Children's education ==
"Scovill Zoo’s education programs offer opportunities designed to help animal lovers of all ages explore and discover the animal kingdom through unique and innovative experiences. From our Zoo Academy to our Mobile Zoo, our education programs provide fun, hands-on connections to the animal world", states the Scovill Zoo website.

Classes and programs are as follows:

	Animal Crackers	Critter Encounters	Zoo Kids	Zoo Camp	Zoo Crew	Mobile Zoo
Age	3 to 5 years old	1st and 2nd graders	3rd graders	4th graders	5th thru 8th graders	All Ages
Time	Once a month	Throughout the summer	Summer mornings	Summer 5-day session	Summer 2 week 3-hour sessions	All-year round, except May
Description	"Listen to a story, meet exciting animals, complete a fun craft, and enjoy a snack"	"Listen to a story, meet an animal, complete a craft, and participate in an exciting activity"	"Explore the wonderful world of animals as they study habitats"	"Explore the zoo to learn about animal life and classification"	"Covers various topics with hands-on projects, zoo chores, and a chance to make new friends"	"For a unique, hands-on animal experience, let Scovill Zoo bring the zoo to you"

== Features ==
The Z.O. & O. Express Train The Z.O. & O. Express Train travels a 1-mile (1.6 km) path through the zoo. The passengers receive a guided tour and behind-the-scenes look at some of the animals residing at Scovill Zoo. Originally added in 1984, the train is a modeled after an 1863 C. P. Huntington steam train.

The Endangered Species Carousel The Endangered Species Carousel consists of 30 hand-carved wooden animals, each representing species protected and endangered. The carousel was designed especially for Scovill Zoo and has proved to be one of the zoo's most popular attractions.

== Exhibits ==
=== Seasonal adjustments ===
Because of Illinois' changing climate, Scovill Zoo must make special accommodations for some of the animals in residence.

==== Summer ====
Scovill Zoo responds to high rises in temperature during the summer months by using fans, pools, and a variety of frozen treats for their animals. Though each animal is supplied with shade in their habitat, animals with thick fur coats like the wolves can still overheat. Zookeepers often prepare "frozen blood balls" for the wolves out of the drippings of their meat diet. Other animals, such as the pelicans, are misted by keepers or provided with fans and pools.

==== Winter ====
The zoo, which closes to the public during the winter months, has made several adjustments to existing habitats and has added new buildings to house animals that are not equipped for the drop in temperature. Acclimated animals such as wolves and cheetahs are allowed to remain in their exhibits all year long; animals from non-acclimated species, such as tropical birds, alligators, and primates, are moved to heated buildings.

Scovill Zoo is typically open from the start of April until the end of October.

List of animals

Following is a list of animals that can be found at Scovill Zoo:

===== Birds =====
- Chicken
- Crane, East African crowned
- Conure, sun
- Dove, ringed turtle
- Duck, call
- Duck, crested
- Eagle, bald
- Egret, cattle
- Emu
- Flamingo, Chilean
- Fowl, guinea
- Gull, ring-billed
- Hawk, red-tailed
- Kookaburra, laughing
- Macaw, blue-and-yellow
- Macaw, red-and-green
- Owl, barn
- Owl, great horned
- Owl, screech
- Peafowl
- Pelican, American white
- Pheasant, golden
- Pigeon
- Teal, ringed
- Toucan, red billed
- Vulture, turkey
- Turaco, Lady Ross’
- Penguin, Humboldt

===== Fish =====
- Goldfish

===== Insects and spiders =====
- Cockroach, Madagascar hissing
- Scorpion, emperor
- Scorpion, plains stripeless
- Tarantula

===== Mammals =====
- Bat, Egyptian fruit
- Binturong
- Camel, Bactrian
- Cheetah
- Chinchilla
- Coati, white-nosed
- Cow
- Deer, tufted
- Deer, white-tailed
- Degu, common
- Ferret
- Goat, African pygmy
- Goat, Nubian
- Guinea hog
- Guinea pig
- Hedgehog, African pygmy
- Lemur, ring-tailed
- Llama
- Meerkat
- Monkey, spider
- Panda, red
- Prairie dog, black-tailed
- Rabbit
- Tamarin, cotton-top
- Tamarin, Geoffroy's
- Tamarin, golden lion
- Tenrec, lesser hedgehog
- Wallaby, red-necked
- Wolf, gray
- Zebra, Grant's
- Zebu, dwarf

===== Reptiles and amphibians =====
- Alligator, American
- Axolotl
- Central bearded dragon
- Boa constrictor
- Desert rosy boa
- Boa, smooth sand
- Frog, African clawed
- Argentine horned frog (PacMan frog)
- Frog, poison arrow
- Gecko, leopard
- Iguana, green
- Iguana, rhinoceros
- Lizard, glass
- Milksnake, Pueblan
- Toad, giant marine
- Tortoise, Galapagos
- Tortoise, leopard
- Tortoise, red-footed
- Turtle, box
- Turtle, map
- Turtle, painted
- Turtle, red-eared slider
- Monitor, Argus
- Monitor, green tree
- Monitor, savannah
- Python, Burmese
- Python, green tree
- Skink, blue-tongued
- Snake, corn
- Snake, black rat
- Snake, yellow rat
- Tegu, black and yellow
