= Decatur Correctional Center =

Prison for women in Decatur, Illinois

Coordinates: 39°53′41.3″N 88°55′37.6″W

Decatur Correctional Center is a prison for women in Decatur, Illinois, United States. It is operated by the Illinois Department of Corrections (IDOC). It first opened on January 24, 2000. Sex offenders are not placed in Decatur Correctional.

The prison, which includes the "Moms and Babies" program, has the only nursery for newborn babies in IDOC; it has eight cells in the E-Wing equipped with childcare facilities. Women convicted of nonviolent offenses may care for their newborns while serving time. The cells are video-monitored, and do not have bars. The mothers in this program are separated from the general population, and other prisoners are kept where they are when children are transferred within the prison. Due to a desire to not cause stress on the children, the correctional officers do not handcuff the women in the nursery area. The prison only accepts mothers who will be released in time to continue taking care of their children; therefore each woman has two or fewer years of time remaining. As of 2015 most women in the prison do not qualify and must immediately give up their children after their births occur.

== See also ==
- Incarceration of women in the United States
