= Roosevelt Junior High School (Decatur, Illinois) =

- U.S. National Register of Historic Places
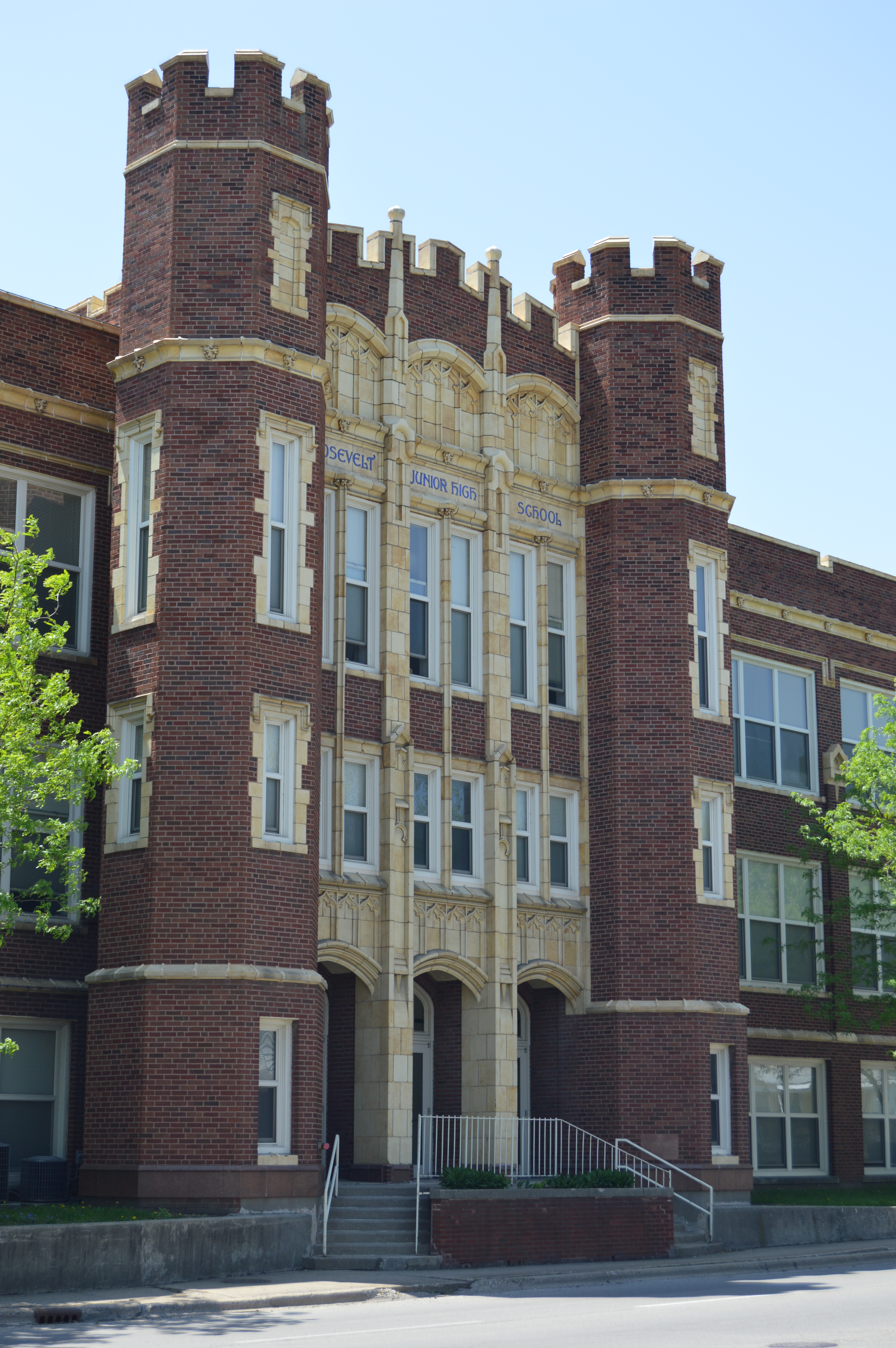

- Location within Illinois Location within the United States
- Location: 701 W. Grand Ave., Decatur, Illinois
- Coordinates: 39°51′23″N 88°57′54″W
- Area: 6.5 acres (2.6 ha)
- Built: 1917-21
- Built by: Kravel, H.B.
- Architect: Brooks, Bramhall & Dague
- Architectural style: Late Gothic Revival
- NRHP reference No.: 02000462
- Added to NRHP: May 9, 2002

Roosevelt Junior High School is a historic school located in Decatur, Illinois, United States. Built from 1917 to 1921, the school was the first exclusive middle school in the city. Decatur architectural firm Brooks, Bramhall & Dague designed the school in the Collegiate Gothic style, a popular choice for educational buildings at the time. The three-story building is built from red brick and features terracotta trim designed to resemble stone. The front entrance is designed to resemble a castle's keep, with octagonal turrets on either side and the extensive use of terracotta to form arches, piers and spandrels. The rest of the building features buttresses and Gothic arches throughout, and a battlement surrounds the edge of the roof. The school operated continuously from its opening until 2000. In recent years, the building has been converted to an apartment complex.

The school was added to the National Register of Historic Places on May 9, 2002.
