= James Millikin House =

Historic house in Illinois, United States

- U.S. National Register of Historic Places
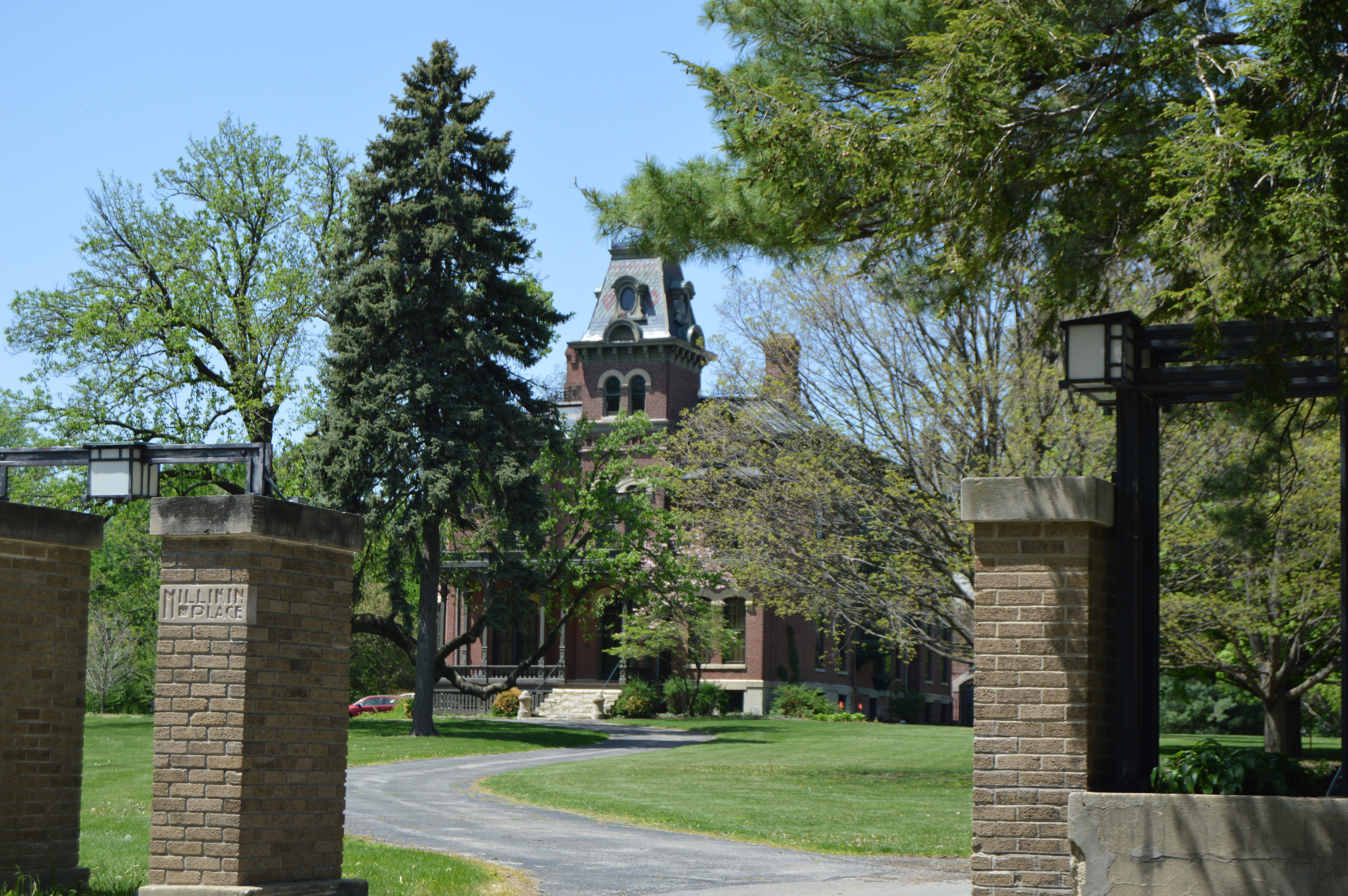

- Location within Illinois Location within the United States
- Location: 125 N. Pine St., Decatur, Illinois
- Coordinates: 39°50′31″N 88°58′1″W
- Area: 5 acres (2.0 ha)
- Built: 1876
- Architectural style: Second Empire, Italianate
- NRHP reference No.: 74000765
- Added to NRHP: December 3, 1974

The James Millikin House is a historic house located at 125 N. Pine St. in Decatur, Illinois. The house was built in 1876 for James Millikin, a wealthy Decatur businessman who later founded Millikin University. The house has a towered Italianate design which has been called the "most imposing Victorian remnant" in Decatur. A mansard roof on the tallest tower provides a Second Empire influence to the design. The house's interior decorations include colored marble fireplaces, art glass windows, and a fresco above the main staircase.

The house was added to the National Register of Historic Places on December 3, 1974. Millikin University currently owns the house, which is open to the public as a museum.
