= William W. Boyington =

American architect

William Warren Boyington
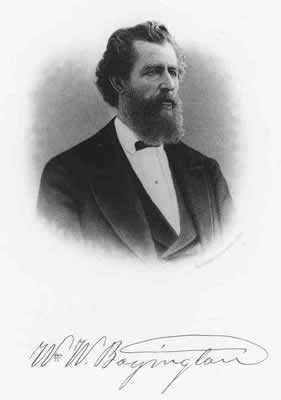
- Born: July 22, 1818; Southwick, Massachusetts, U.S.
- Died: October 16, 1898 (aged 80); Highland Park, Illinois U.S.
- Occupation: Architect
- Buildings: Chicago Water Tower

William Warren Boyington (July 22, 1818 – October 16, 1898) was an American architect who designed several notable structures in and around Chicago, Illinois. He was also mayor of Highland Park, Illinois.

== History ==
Originally from Massachusetts, W.W. Boyington studied engineering and architecture in the State of New York. After this, he practiced there and served in the New York State Legislature before he decided to settle and work in the emerging metropolis of Chicago, Illinois, in 1853. Many of his buildings were constructed before the Great Chicago Fire of 1871 and destroyed by it; however, the Chicago Water Tower and pumping station of 1869 survived and have become well-loved landmarks.

== Works ==
Works accredited to W.W. Boyington include:

- The First LaSalle Street Station, 1867-71 (cost $225,000
- Chicago Water Tower and pumping station, 1869
- Second Presbyterian Church, 1888 (since 1987 the Cornerstone Building) in Peoria Illinois (cost $50,000)
- The New State Capitol Building in Springfield, Illinois
- the first University of Chicago located at 34th Street and Cottage Grove Avenue (1859, 1863, 1865* all demolished)
- the first Sherman House located at Clark and Randolph Streets 1859, (demolished in 1910)
- residence for Washington and Jane Smith, 1870 (cost $75,000), demolished
- the entrance gate of Rosehill Cemetery
- the old Second Baptist Church of Chicago (now the Aiken Institute)
- the 1864 Democratic Convention Hall
- the old Chicago Board of Trade Building at the Head of LaSalle Street, 1885 (demolished in 1928 for construction of the present Holabird and Root Building)
- and the Windsor Hotel of Denver, Colorado
- the Terrace Hill Homestead (Iowa's Governor's Mansion)
- the Hegeler Carus Mansion of LaSalle, Illinois
- Heaney's Block in Rochester, Minnesota, 1866 (destroyed by fire 1917)\
- the Milikin Bank Building (demolished) in Decatur, Illinois
- the Illinois State Building for the 1893 Chicago World's Columbian Exposition (demolished at the end of the fair)
- the Transfer House, 1896 in Decatur
- and the Joliet Prison. His Grand Pacific Hotel, 1871, was destroyed by the Great Chicago Fire as it was being completed but was rebuilt according to the original plans in 1873.

== Death ==
Boyington died on October 16, 1898, in Highland Park, where he had moved in 1874 after having lost two residences in Chicago to fire in quick succession (the first one as a result of the Great Chicago Fire). While in Highland Park he served two successive terms as mayor. He is buried at Rosehill Cemetery on Chicago's north side.

== Gallery ==
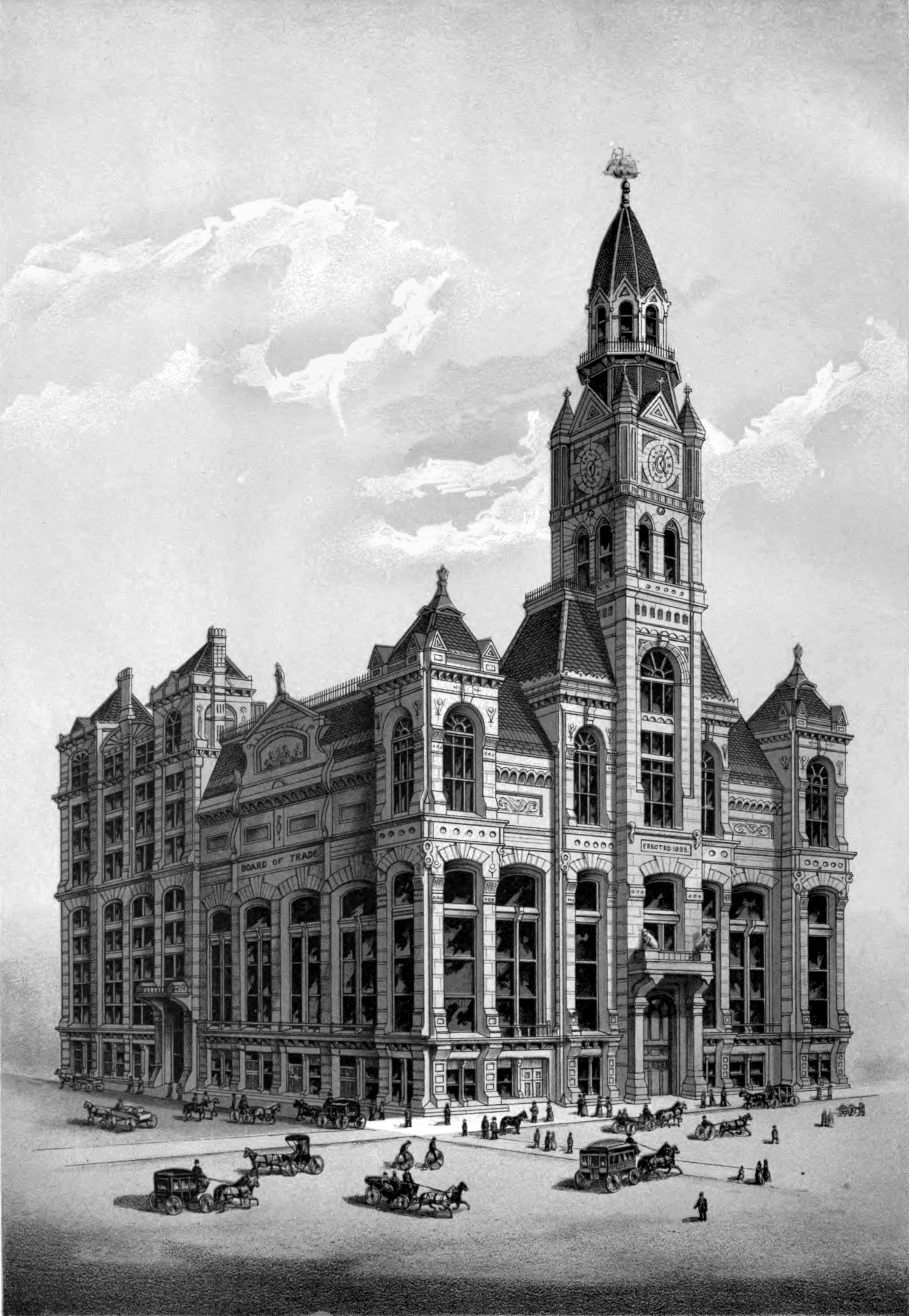
The Chicago Board of Trade, (1885-c. 1925)

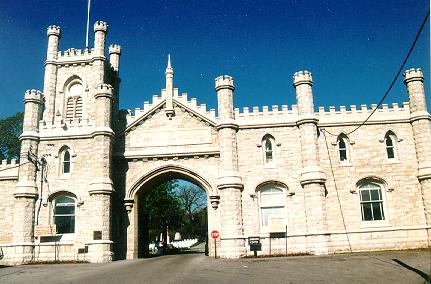
Boyington's limestone entrance of Rosehill Cemetery

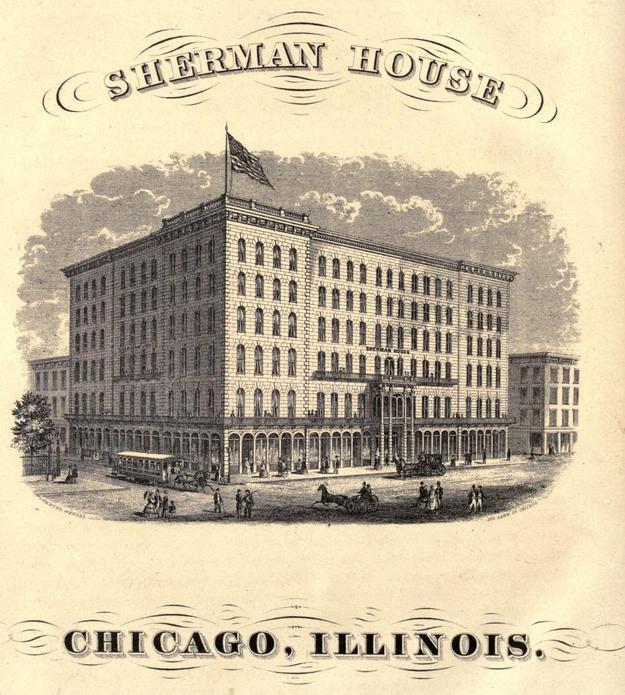
The Sherman House Hotel, Chicago, Illinois (1861–1873)
