= Transfer House (Decatur, Illinois) =

- U.S. National Register of Historic Places
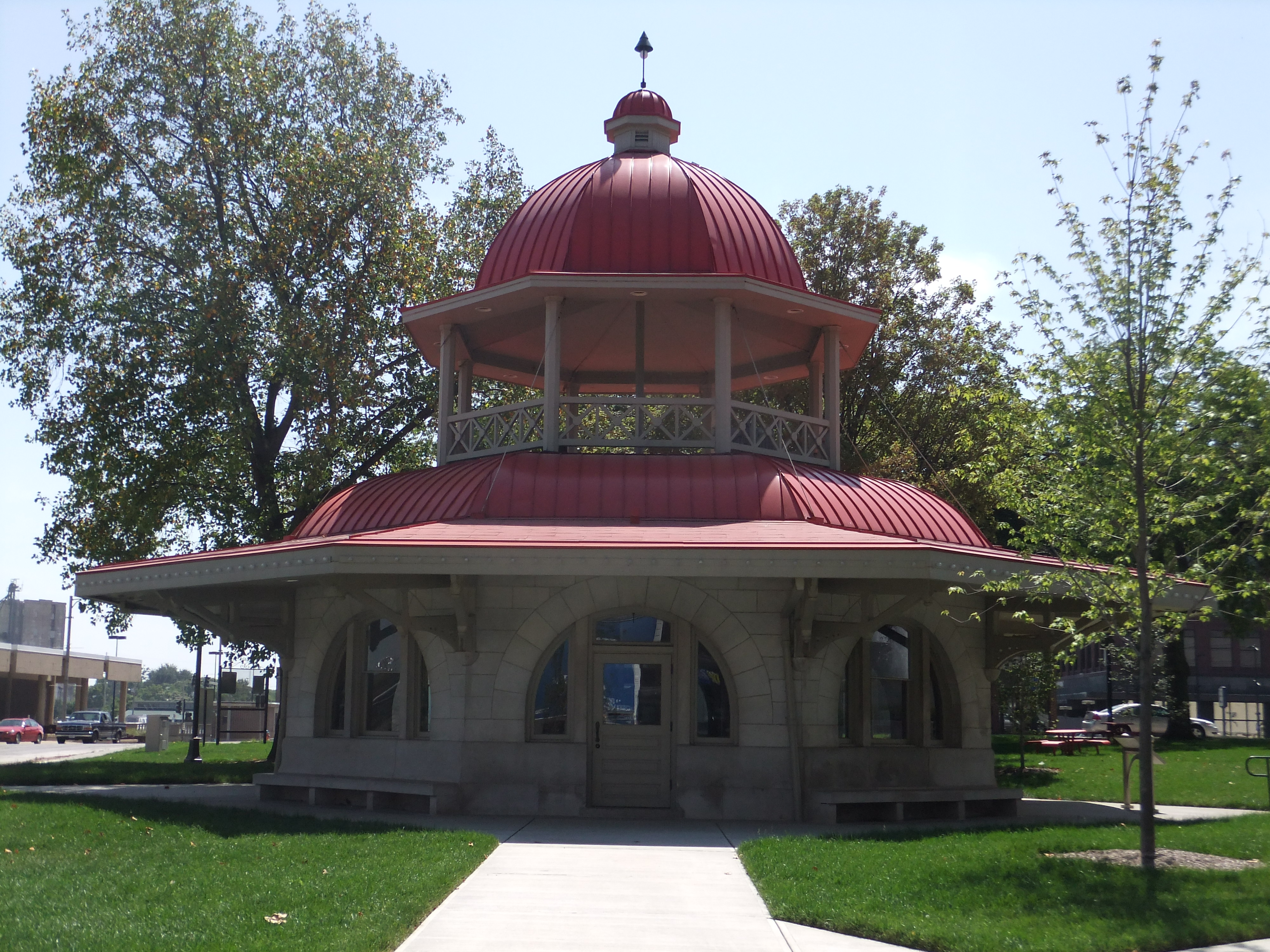

- Location within Illinois Location within the United States
- Location: 1 Central Park East, Decatur, Illinois
- Coordinates: 39°50′33″N 88°57′12″W
- Area: less than one acre
- Built: 1896
- Architect: Boyington, William W.
- Architectural style: Richardsonian Romanesque
- NRHP reference No.: 02000843
- Added to NRHP: December 3, 2002

The Transfer House is a historic building located in Central Park in Decatur, Illinois. Built in 1896, the building originally served as a transfer point for Decatur's electric streetcar system. Architect William W. Boyington's design for the building was influenced by a number of Victorian styles, particularly the Richardsonian Romanesque. The building was ultimately moved to Central Park and is now listed on the National Register of Historic Places.

== History ==
The Transfer House was built on Lincoln Square (Intersection of N/S Main Street and E/W Main Street) in 1896 to serve as Decatur's main transfer point for City Electric Railway streetcars and Illinois Traction System interurban trains. As Lincoln Square was facing competition from other Decatur business districts, local business leaders felt the square needed a grander replacement for its old transfer building. When the Transfer House opened, the businessmen hired an orchestra and offered free souvenirs and train rides to draw visitors to the new building; the opening ceremonies drew large crowds, exceeding the businessmen's expectations. The building soon became a focal point of Decatur, as nearly every streetcar traveler in the city needed to stop there to transfer. The open-air bandstand on the building's roof and its central location made it a convenient place for community events and public gatherings; many prominent speakers, including three U.S. presidents, gave speeches from the building.

After the streetcar and interurban systems ceased operations in the 1950s, the Transfer House was reduced to a bus terminal and lost most of its passenger volume. The Illinois Department of Transportation recommended that the city move the building, as it interfered with traffic on highway US 51; the city complied in 1962, moving the building to Central Park. The city rehabilitated the building in the 1970s, and it continues to serve as a civic symbol and meeting place. The building was listed on the National Register of Historic Places on December 3, 2002.

== Architecture ==
William W. Boyington, a Chicago architect most famous for designing the Chicago Water Tower, designed the Transfer House. His design includes elements of several Victorian architectural styles, the Richardsonian Romanesque style the most prominent among them. The two-story building has an octagonal plan, a design which gave it more interior space without jutting too far into the surrounding streets. Thick limestone arches, a distinct Romanesque feature. form the first-floor windows and entrances of the building. A bell-shaped roof with a wide canopy provided outdoor shelter for passengers. The second floor of the building consists entirely of the open-air bandstand and is covered by a cupola.
