= Griswold Conservation Area =

USA nature reserve

Coordinates: 39.7040°N 89.1399°W

Griswold Conservation Area is a 43-acre (0.17 km²) park located 0.5 miles northwest of Blue Mound, Illinois. The land preserve, which is operated by the Macon County Conservation District, centers on hiking and picknicking for users in the farming area southwest of Decatur. It is based on a land parcel donated to the county in 1973 by local benefactor and landowner Harry E. Griswold, and the conservation area is named in his honor.

The nearest major highway is Illinois Route 48, at Blue Mound.

== Description ==
=== The kame ===
The adjacent village, Blue Mound, is named for the Griswold Conservation Area's significant glacial kame. This is a surface mound left behind by glaciers during the Illinois glacial period. Ice masses, which melted circa 130,000 years B.P., left random heaps of gravel and loose rock behind. After the kame was quarried for aggregate stone during an extended period of time, with removal activity climaxing in the 1930s, the remains of the mound were set aside for public preservation and use. The remaining kame reaches 706 feet above sea level, up to 80 feet above the flat farmland around the land preserve. A trail serves a public overlook.

=== Wildlife ===
The conservation area features predatory birds such as hawks and owls, which use the raised ground as an observation point just as humans do. Mammals listed by the Conservation District include groundhogs, skunks, opossums, deer, foxes, and coyotes.
