= Kirby Benedict =

American judge

Kirby T. Benedict

Chief Justice of the New Mexico Supreme Court
- In office 1858–1866
- Succeeded by: John P. Slough

Associate Justice of the New Mexico Supreme Court
- In office 1853–1858
- Appointed by: Franklin Pierce

Personal details
- Born: November 23, 1810; Kent, Connecticut, US
- Died: February 27, 1874 (aged 63); Santa Fe, New Mexico, US
- Political party: Democrat

Kirby T. Benedict (1810-1874) was an American attorney and judge best known as the Chief Justice of the territorial New Mexico Supreme Court from 1858 to 1866.

Benedict was born on November 23, 1810, in Kent, Connecticut. He married Charlotte Curtis of Delaware, Ohio in 1834. He moved to Illinois shortly after being admitted to the bar, served a term in the state legislature, and befriended Abraham Lincoln and Stephen A. Douglas.

President Franklin Pierce appointed Benedict associate judge of the Third Judicial District of New Mexico Territory in 1853. In 1858, President James Buchanan appointed Benedict as chief justice of the territorial Supreme Court. He was assigned to the First District and headquartered in Santa Fe. From 1854 to 1866, Benedict rendered twenty-two supreme court decisions.

In addition to his legal work, Benedict helped organize the Historical Society of New Mexico. He was elected as President of the Society in 1862. Governor Connelly appointed Benedict to the three person committee to complete the 1865 Revised statutes and laws of the Territory of New Mexico. President Andrew Johnson replaced him with Colonel John P. Slough in 1866. After losing his position as judge, he worked as a trial attorney until his license was suspended in 1871. He died in Santa Fe, New Mexico of heart failure on February 27, 1874.
