= Decatur Public Transit System =

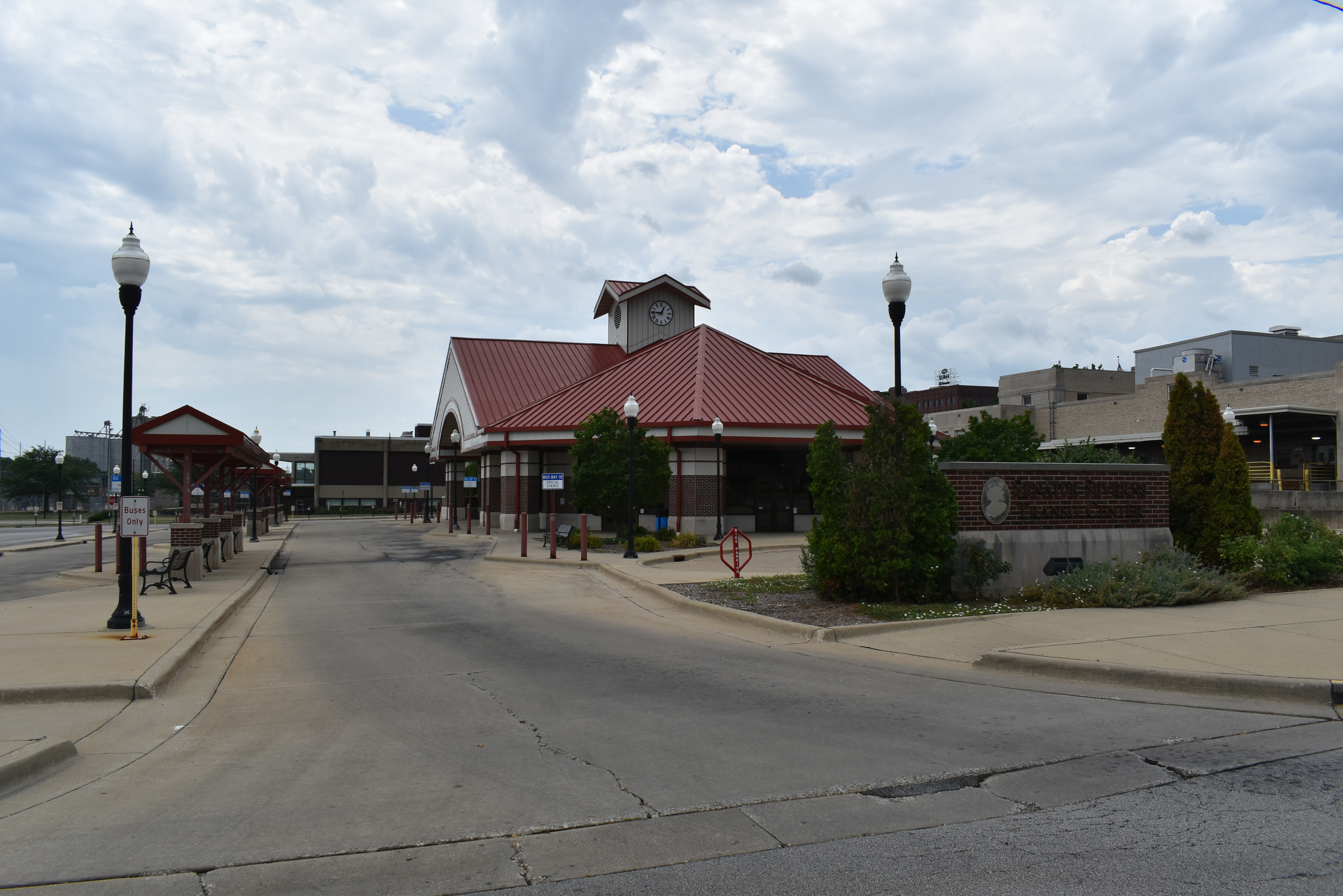
- The Senator Severns Transit Center
- Founded: 1971
- Headquarters: 1 Gary K. Anderson Plaza
- Locale: Decatur, Illinois
- Service area: Macon County, Illinois
- Service type: bus service, paratransit
- Routes: 15
- Website: The Decatur Public Transit System

The Decatur Public Transit System is the primary provider of mass transportation in Macon County, Illinois. Fourteen main routes, plus one downtown shuttle using replica trolleys, serve the region.

== History ==
After the removal of streetcars from the city in 1936, the private National City Lines ran the area's bus services; in 1971, voters chose in a referendum for the public to take over this duty. As of 2022, the bus fleet comprised 21 diesel buses and 2 hybrid buses, but DPTS intends to convert all of its buses to battery electric by 2035. In 2022, the system received a $16.84 million grant towards electrification. This will allow four diesel buses to be replaced with hybrids in 2023 and four electric buses to replace diesel buses in 2025 and every two years thereafter. In addition, the grant will fund electrical upgrades, electric charging equipment and solar panels.

== Routes ==
The Decatur Public Transit system (DPTS) operates 15 bus routes and a downtown trolley route on a pulse system with buses departing the downtown Transit Center at 15 and 45 minutes past each hour. Hours of operation are Monday through Friday from 5:30 A.M. to 7:15 P.M. and on Saturday from 6:15 A.M. to 7:15 P.M. Up until 2022, no service was provided on Sunday or on major holidays. Beginning October 9, 2022, Sunday service began as a one year pilot project with buses running from 9 A.M. to 6 P.M.

Streetcar Transfer House circa 1910

- 11 MLK Dr-Meadowlark
- 12 Airport-Walmart Plaza
- 21 Monroe-Walmart Plaza
- 22 St. Mary's
- 31 West Grand-Ravia Park
- 32 South Shores
- 41 East Grand-Richland Community College
- 51 Jasper
- 52 West Main-Wyckles Rd
- 53 Enterprise-Taylor Rd
- 61 Walter-Hickory Point Mall
- 62 Oakland-Fairview Plaza
- 63 Decatur-Fairview Plaza
- 71 Lost Bridge
- Downtown Trolley

== Senator Severns Transit Center ==
The Senator Severns Transit Center, located downtown at 353 E William St, serves as the primary transfer hub for the Decatur Public Transit System. It was constructed in 2002 and includes amenities such as an indoor waiting area, restrooms, and vending machines. Transit users are also able to purchase transit tokens, passes and punch cards. While the transit center was also intended to serve intercity buses, as of 2022, no intercity buses use the facility. Instead intercity buses stop at a Pilot Truck Stop, located at 4030 East Boyd Road on the north side of Decatur.

== Fixed route ridership ==
The ridership statistics shown here are of fixed route services only and do not include demand response.

== Bus Fleet ==
As of 2025, the transit system has fourteen (14) 2019 diesel Gilligs (numbered 2001 - 2014), four (4) 2020 diesel Gilligs (numbered 2015 - 2018), seven (7) hybrid Gilligs (numbered 2119 - 2120 and 2421 - 2425), and seven (7) gas paratransit vehicles.

== See also ==
- Sangamon Mass Transit District
- Champaign-Urbana Mass Transit District
- List of bus transit systems in the United States
