= Sand Creek Conservation Area =

Protected area in Illinois, United States

Coordinates: 39.786°N 88.943°W

The Sand Creek Conservation Area is a 755-acre (3.06 km^{2}) natural area in the U.S. state of Illinois, located in South Wheatland Township south of Lake Decatur. The conservation area preserves tallgrass prairie and prairie-savanna acreage and serves the people of Macon County and the Decatur metropolitan area. The area is operated by the Macon County Conservation District.

== Description ==
The contiguous parcels of property that make up the Sand Creek Conservation Area were, in pioneer times, patches of wet and damp tallgrass prairie, cut by the muddy ruts of Euro-American carts and wagons. In March 1830 a family, headed by Thomas Lincoln and assisted by his son Abraham Lincoln, slowly made their way westward on the former Paris–Springfield Road as part of their trek from the Lincoln Boyhood National Memorial to a new homestead at what would become the Lincoln Trail Homestead State Memorial near the Sangamon River west of Decatur. The ford over Sand Creek inside today's Conservation Area, now the Old Trace Ford, waded through water that flowed into the Sangamon, and was evidence to the traveling family that they were nearing their Illinois destination. The Lincoln trail is marked by signs.

Remains of the Paris–Springfield Road have been supplemented by other sandy paths to form a 7.6-mile-long (12.2 km) network of Conservation Area trails. Hikers and horseback riders are welcome. For riders, an equestrian fee permit is required. Trailside wildlife features white-tailed deer and upland tallgrass birds, particularly redtail hawks and Eastern bluebirds. Wetland and savannah plant life includes pawpaw trees and wahoo bushes.

The Conservation Area is primarily accessed by a parking area on the north-south Franklin Road, a rural Macon County road south of Decatur's city limits. The parking area is 4.0 miles south of center-city Decatur.
