= Downs, Illinois =

- Village
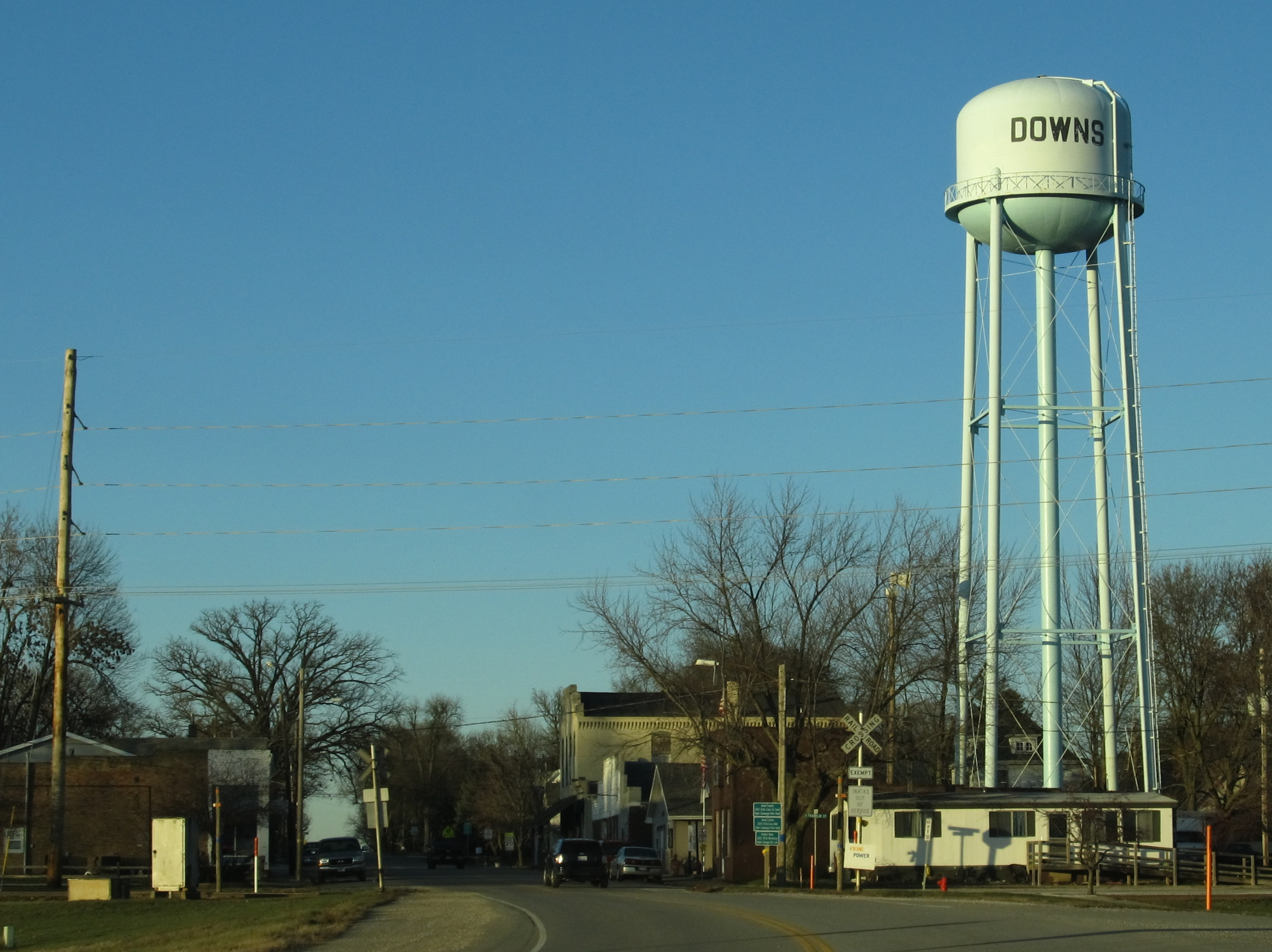
- Downtown Downs

- Location in McLean County, Illinois
- Coordinates: 40°23′48″N 88°52′45″W
- Country: United States
- State: Illinois
- County: McLean
- Townships: Downs, Oldtown

Area
  - Total: 3.00 sq mi (7.76 km^{2})
  - Land: 3.00 sq mi (7.76 km^{2})
  - Water: 0 sq mi (0.00 km^{2})
- Elevation: 755 ft (230 m)

Population (2020)
  - Total: 1,201
  - Density: 400.6/sq mi (154.67/km^{2})
- Time zone: UTC-6 (CST)
  - Summer (DST): UTC-5 (CDT)
- ZIP codes: 61736 (Downs); 61705 (Bloomington)
- Area code: 309
- GNIS ID: 2398746
- FIPS code: 17-20643
- Website: www.villageofdowns.org

Downs is a village in McLean County, Illinois, United States. The population was 1,201 at the 2020 census, up from 1,005 in 2010. It is part of the Bloomington–Normal Metropolitan Statistical Area.

== History ==
Downs was originally a small community known as "Delta", established by McLean County settlers in 1829. Previously, the area served as a trading post for the Kickapoo people. When the Indiana, Bloomington and Western Railway was built in 1869, several buildings were dismantled and reconstructed further south to put the town closer to the railroad. The town was then renamed "Priceville" in honor of John Price, a resident who owned the land near the tracks. In 1902, the town's name was changed to "Downs", after postal clerks commonly confused Priceville with the similarly named Illinois town of Princeville. Downs is named for Lawson Downs, one of the area's pioneer settlers.

== Geography ==
Downs is in southern McLean County, 9 miles (14 km) southeast of Bloomington, the county seat. U.S. Route 150 passes through the northeast side of the village, leading northwest to Bloomington and southeast 6 miles (10 km) to Le Roy. Interstate 74 passes through the southwest side of the village, with access from Exit 142. I-74 leads northwest to Bloomington and southeast 40 miles (64 km) to Champaign.

According to the U.S. Census Bureau, Downs has a total area of 3.00 square miles (7.77 km^{2}), all land. Kickapoo Creek flows through the northwest side of the village, leading southwest to Salt Creek, a tributary of the Sangamon River, near Lincoln.

== Demographics ==
Historical population
Census	Pop.	Note	%±
1920	295		—
1930	295		0.0%
1940	301		2.0%
1950	299		−0.7%
1960	497		66.2%
1970	651		31.0%
1980	561		−13.8%
1990	620		10.5%
2000	776		25.2%
2010	1,005		29.5%
2020	1,201		19.5%
Decennial US Census

=== 2020 census ===
As of the 2020 census, Downs had a population of 1,201. The median age was 36.8 years. 33.1% of residents were under the age of 18 and 9.7% of residents were 65 years of age or older. For every 100 females there were 95.0 males, and for every 100 females age 18 and over there were 93.5 males age 18 and over.

0.0% of residents lived in urban areas, while 100.0% lived in rural areas.

There were 420 households in Downs, of which 48.1% had children under the age of 18 living in them. Of all households, 59.5% were married-couple households, 12.9% were households with a male householder and no spouse or partner present, and 21.0% were households with a female householder and no spouse or partner present. About 16.7% of all households were made up of individuals and 4.8% had someone living alone who was 65 years of age or older.

There were 438 housing units, of which 4.1% were vacant. The homeowner vacancy rate was 0.5% and the rental vacancy rate was 0.0%.

Racial composition as of the 2020 census
Race	Number	Percent
White	1,130	94.1%
Black or African American	8	0.7%
American Indian and Alaska Native	1	0.1%
Asian	8	0.7%
Native Hawaiian and Other Pacific Islander	0	0.0%
Some other race	3	0.2%
Two or more races	51	4.2%
Hispanic or Latino (of any race)	15	1.2%

=== 2010 census ===
As of 2010 the population was 1005. The racial and ethnic make-up of the population is 94.6% Non-Hispanic white, 1.7% African American, 0.2% Native American, 0.7% Asian, 2.2% two or more races and 0.9% Hispanic or Latino.

=== 2000 census ===
As of the census of 2000, there were 776 people, 284 households, and 220 families residing in the village. The population density was 286.8 inhabitants per square mile (110.7/km^{2}). There were 301 housing units at an average density of 111.3 per square mile (43.0/km^{2}). The racial makeup of the village was 97.81% White, 0.90% African American, 0.13% Asian, 0.52% from other races, and 0.64% from two or more races. Hispanic or Latino of any race were 0.90% of the population. There were 284 households, out of which 43.0% had children under the age of 18 living with them, 65.8% were married couples living together, 9.5% had a female householder with no husband present, and 22.5% were non-families. 17.3% of all households were made up of individuals, and 6.3% had someone living alone who was 65 years of age or older. The average household size was 2.73 and the average family size was 3.13.

In the village, the population was spread out, with 30.3% under the age of 18, 7.5% from 18 to 24, 35.4% from 25 to 44, 19.3% from 45 to 64, and 7.5% who were 65 years of age or older. The median age was 33 years.

The median income for a household in the village was $53,750, and the median income for a family was $56,932. Males had a median income of $37,188 versus $27,308 for females. The per capita income for the village was $22,468. About 5.0% of families and 4.3% of the population were below the poverty line, including 4.0% of those under age 18 and none of those age 65 or over

== Schools ==
Most children in Downs attend the Tri-Valley schools, which are part of Tri-Valley Community Unit School District 3, with district offices on Washington Street. The Tri-Valley schools are smaller than most in the surrounding area, with the elementary, middle, and high schools all located next to each other. Tri-Valley Elementary School and Tri-Valley Middle School have been recognized as National Blue Ribbon Schools by the U.S. Department of Education. Tri-Valley High School was formed in 1963 by the consolidation of Downs Community High School and Ellsworth High School and moved to its current building in 1979; the former Downs high school building across the street was demolished in 1980. The high school's football team, the Tri-Valley Vikings, won the IHSA Class 2A state championship in 2015.

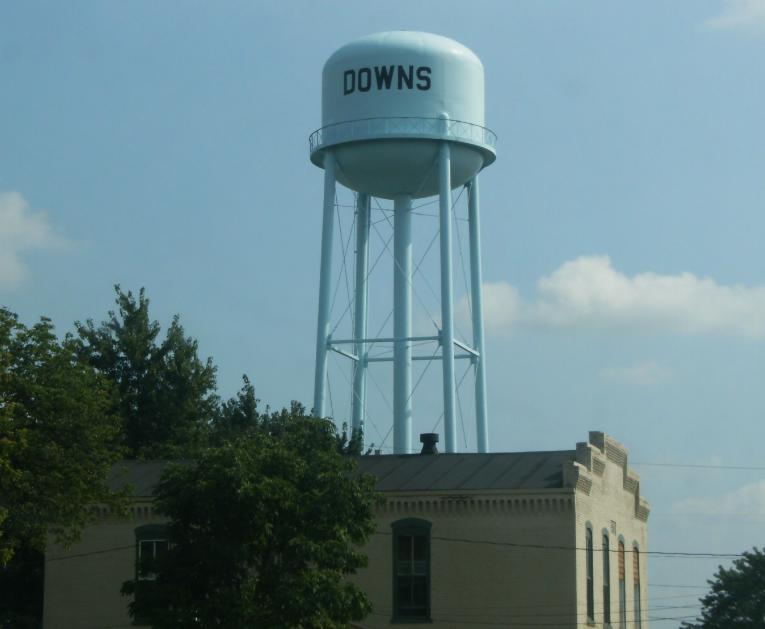
The water tower in Downs.

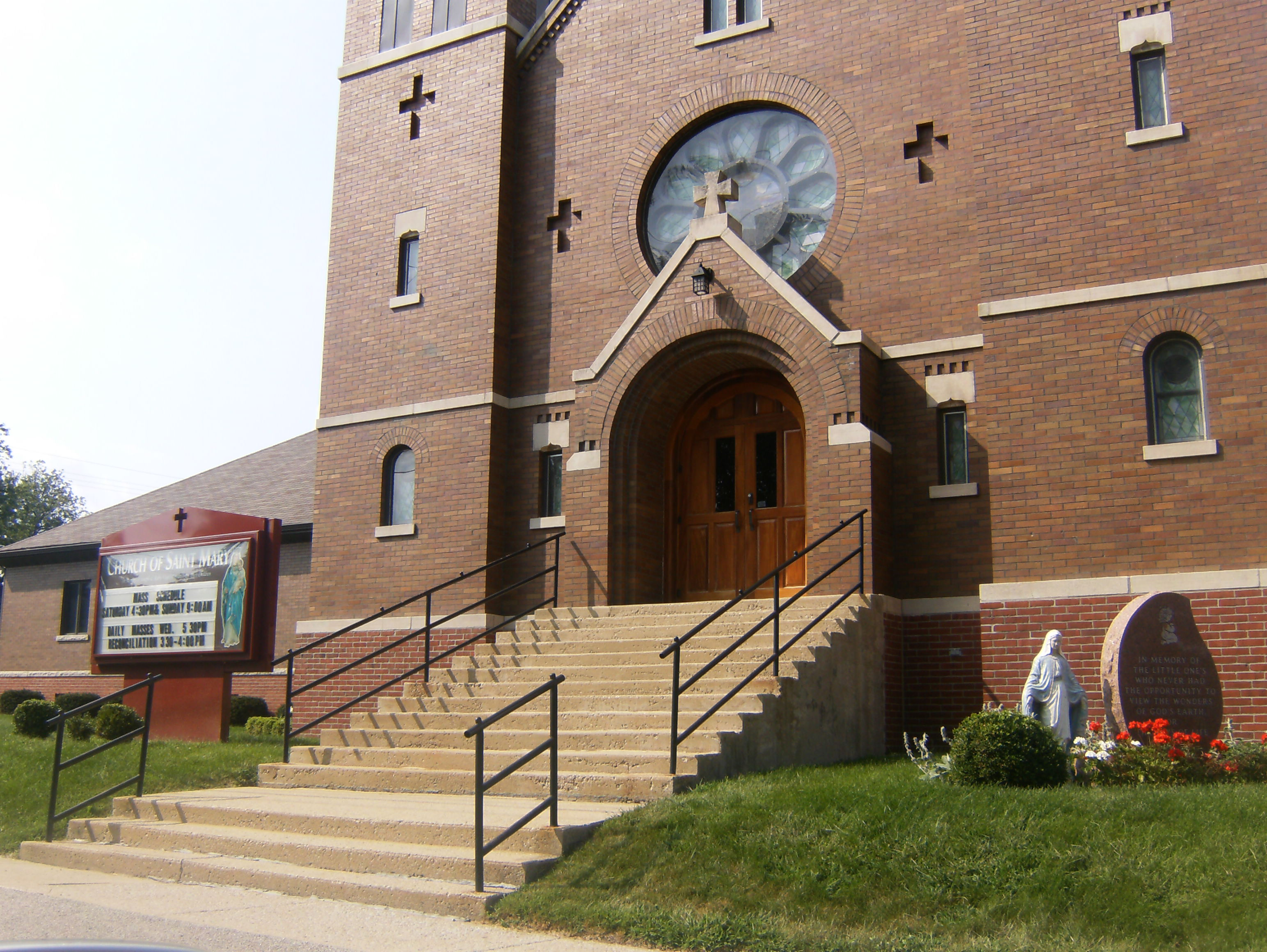
Church of Saint Mary in Downs.
