= Heyworth, Illinois =

- Village
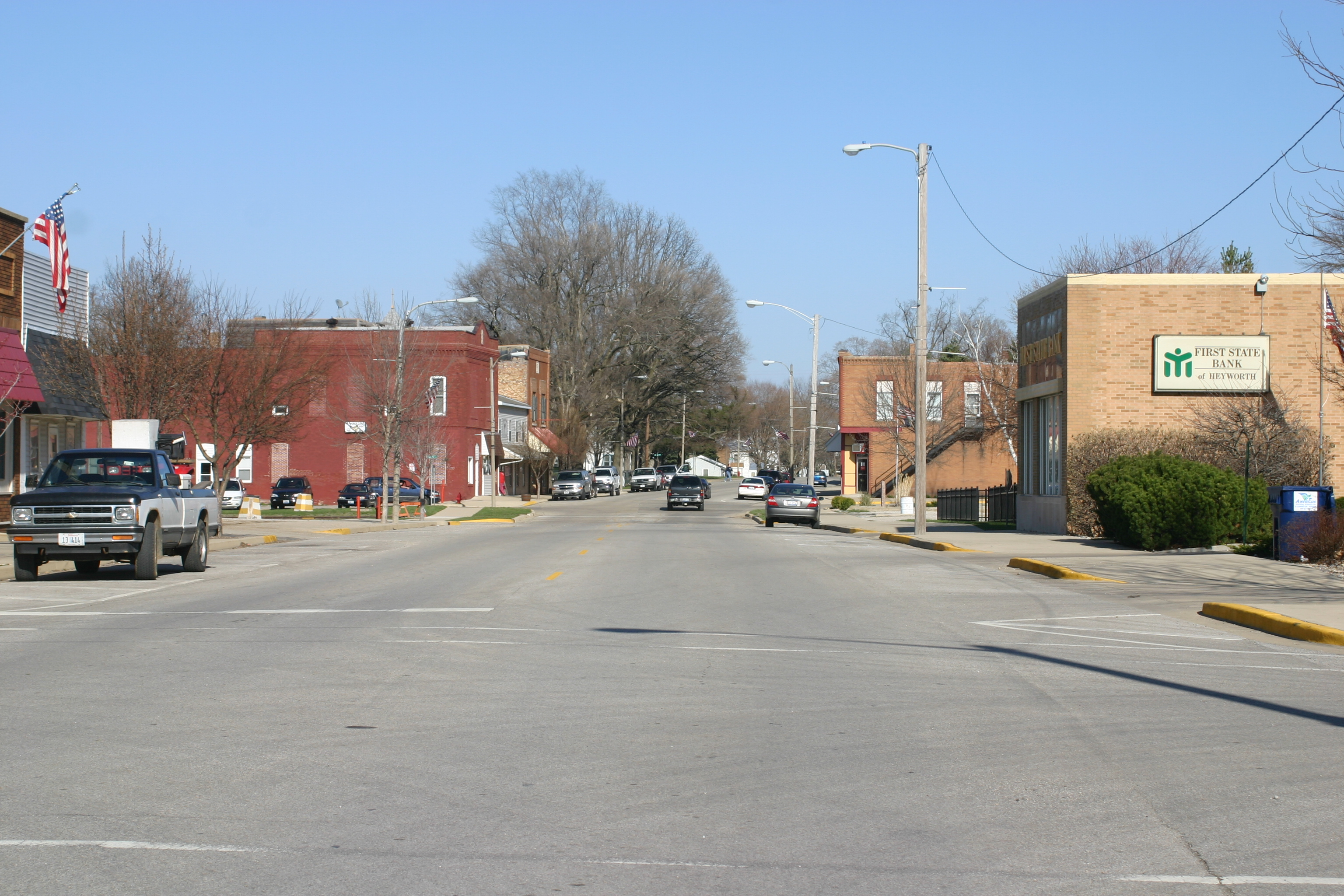
- Looking east on Main Street in downtown Heyworth

- Flag Logo

- Location in McLean County, Illinois
- Coordinates: 40°18′50″N 88°59′44″W
- Country: United States
- State: Illinois
- County: McLean
- Township: Randolph
- Founded: 1855
- Named for: Lawrence Heyworth

Government
  - Mayor: Eric Moore

Area
  - Total: 3.39 sq mi (8.78 km^{2})
  - Land: 3.33 sq mi (8.62 km^{2})
  - Water: 0.062 sq mi (0.16 km^{2})
- Elevation: 722 ft (220 m)

Population (2020)
  - Total: 2,791
  - Estimate (2024): 2,883
  - Density: 838.6/sq mi (323.79/km^{2})
- Time zone: UTC-6 (CST)
  - Summer (DST): UTC-5 (CDT)
- ZIP code: 61745
- Area code: 309
- FIPS code: 17-34449
- GNIS ID: 2398499
- Website: heyworth-il.gov

Heyworth is a village in McLean County, Illinois, United States. It was founded in 1859. As of the 2020 census, Heyworth had a population of 2,791. It is part of the Bloomington–Normal Metropolitan Statistical Area.

== History ==
Heyworth was laid out by Campbell Wakefield on September 11, 1859. Before settlement, the locality now known as Heyworth was covered by a heavy growth of timber and underbrush which was inhabited by the Kickapoo Native Americans, and supported a great number of deer, wild turkeys, and packs of large gray wolves.

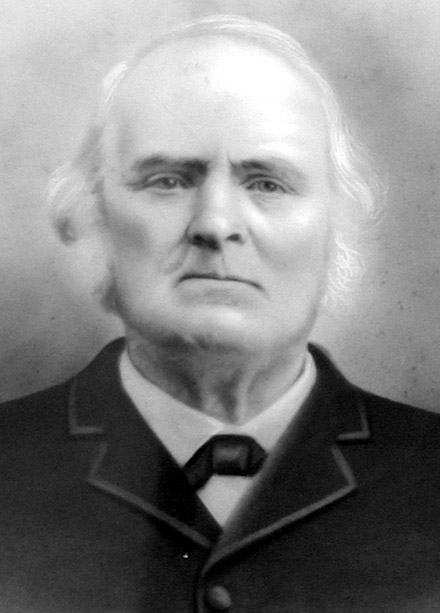
Campbell Wakefield

As settlers began to move West, families such as the Rutledges, Funks, Passwaters, Bishops, Nobles, Wakefields, and Martens settled in the immediate vicinity of the present village of Heyworth as early as 1824. Campbell Wakefield was the primary founder of Heyworth. In the course of his achievements, Wakefield became the owner of a vast tract of land including what is now Heyworth. He continually added to his original tract until he obtained about 1,500 acres (6.1 km^{2}) in one plot.

As the population of the region increased and industries began to spring up, railroads were becoming a great advantage. In 1852 and 1853, the Illinois Central Railroad was constructed through the Wakefield land. When the line became operational in 1855, the residents hoped to put a train station in the vicinity. Many property owners vied for the station, but Wakefield immediately donated a large tract of land for the station. Additionally he set aside adjacent land for the foundation of a town, a Presbyterian church, and a district school.

The first post office was built in the vicinity under the name Short's Point in 1847 before a subsequent renaming to Independence in 1850. In 1856, when the new railway station was opened, the name "Elmwood" was chosen, but it was soon discovered that this name was already taken by a locality in Peoria County. The president of the Illinois Central Railroad proposed calling the new station "Heyworth", after Lawrence Heyworth, an English director of the railroad, which became official on March 29, 1858.

After the establishment of the station, Campbell Wakefield made several donations to encourage trade and induce businessmen to locate in the new town. He became the proprietor of the new town, and the village of Heyworth was incorporated on March 31, 1869.

== Geography ==
Heyworth is in southern McLean County and is served by two U.S. highways. U.S. Route 51 passes through the west side of Heyworth as a four-lane divided highway, leading north 12 miles (19 km) to Bloomington, the county seat, and south the same distance to Clinton. U.S. Route 136 passes through the village center, leading east 43 miles (69 km) to Rantoul and west 10 miles (16 km) to McLean.

According to the U.S. Census Bureau, Heyworth has a total area of 3.39 square miles (8.78 km^{2}), of which 3.33 square miles (8.6 km^{2}) are land and 0.06 square miles (0.16 km^{2}), or 1.86%, are water. Kickapoo Creek passes through the western part of the village, flowing southwest to Salt Creek and then the Sangamon River, a tributary of the Illinois River.

== Demographics ==
Historical population
Census	Pop.	Note	%±
1870	300		—
1880	560		86.7%
1890	566		1.1%
1900	683		20.7%
1910	681		−0.3%
1920	851		25.0%
1930	959		12.7%
1940	996		3.9%
1950	1,072		7.6%
1960	1,196		11.6%
1970	1,441		20.5%
1980	1,598		10.9%
1990	1,627		1.8%
2000	2,431		49.4%
2010	2,841		16.9%
2020	2,791		−1.8%
Decennial US Census

=== 2020 census ===
As of the 2020 census, Heyworth had a population of 2,791. The median age was 37.9 years. 28.3% of residents were under the age of 18 and 13.9% of residents were 65 years of age or older. For every 100 females there were 96.3 males, and for every 100 females age 18 and over there were 92.9 males age 18 and over.

0.0% of residents lived in urban areas, while 100.0% lived in rural areas.

There were 1,028 households in Heyworth, of which 39.5% had children under the age of 18 living in them. Of all households, 58.6% were married-couple households, 12.6% were households with a male householder and no spouse or partner present, and 21.1% were households with a female householder and no spouse or partner present. About 20.4% of all households were made up of individuals and 8.7% had someone living alone who was 65 years of age or older.

There were 1,080 housing units, of which 4.8% were vacant. The homeowner vacancy rate was 1.5% and the rental vacancy rate was 6.5%.

Racial composition as of the 2020 census
Race	Number	Percent
White	2,609	93.5%
Black or African American	8	0.3%
American Indian and Alaska Native	2	0.1%
Asian	12	0.4%
Native Hawaiian and Other Pacific Islander	0	0.0%
Some other race	31	1.1%
Two or more races	129	4.6%
Hispanic or Latino (of any race)	87	3.1%

=== Demographic estimates ===
According to a 2007 census estimate, there were 687 families residing in the village, and the population density was 1,573.6 inhabitants per square mile (607.6/km^{2}).

Of all households, 23.4% were non-families. The average household size was 2.71 and the average family size was 3.12.

In the village, 6.1% of residents were from 18 to 24, 33.0% were from 25 to 44, and 19.3% were from 45 to 64.

=== Income and poverty ===
The median income for a household in the village was $53,043, and the median income for a family was $60,648. Males had a median income of $40,944 versus $26,708 for females. The per capita income for the village was $20,655. About 2.9% of families and 3.1% of the population were below the poverty line, including 2.8% of those under age 18 and 2.0% of those age 65 or over.

== Economy and services ==
While railroads brought growth during the 19th century, growth today is driven by recession-resistant business expansion occurring primarily in Bloomington–Normal, located 12 miles (19 km) north of Heyworth on U.S. Route 51.

Community services include local police protection, a volunteer fire department, local 24-hour ambulance service which will soon have paid paramedics on staff, local schools from kindergarten through grade 12, and several churches of various denominations. The annual Hey Days celebration in May features a carnival, food and live entertainment. Christmas is celebrated with the "Holidays Heyworth Style" parade and craft show.

OSF Primary Care, a medical clinic operated by the OSF Healthcare System under the auspices of OSF St. Joseph's Medical Center in Bloomington, opened in January 2010. The facility provides in-town healthcare access to Heyworth residents for the first time since 1989.

== Schools ==
Heyworth Elementary School services grades Pre K - 6. The school is located at 100 S. Joselyn St.

Heyworth Jr/Sr High School services grades 7 - 12. The school is located at 308 W. Cleveland St. The Junior High offers the following sports for students: Basketball, Baseball, Softball, Volleyball, Track and Wrestling. The Senior High offers the following sports and activities for students: Basketball, Football, Golf, Soccer, Volleyball, Baseball, Softball, Track, Cheerleading, Marching Band, Speech, Wrestling, and FFA.
