= Harristown, Illinois =

- Village
- Location in Macon County, Illinois
- Coordinates: 39°50′34″N 89°03′39″W
- Country: United States
- State: Illinois
- County: Macon
- Townships: Harristown, Decatur

Area
  - Total: 1.80 sq mi (4.65 km^{2})
  - Land: 1.80 sq mi (4.65 km^{2})
  - Water: 0 sq mi (0.00 km^{2})
- Elevation: 676 ft (206 m)

Population (2020)
  - Total: 1,310
  - Density: 729/sq mi (281.5/km^{2})
- Time zone: UTC-6 (CST)
  - Summer (DST): UTC-5 (CDT)
- ZIP code: 62537 (Harristown); 62522 (Decatur)
- Area code: 217
- FIPS code: 17-33227
- GNIS feature ID: 2398254
- Website: villageofharristown.com

Harristown is a village in Macon County, Illinois, United States. The population was 1,310 at the 2020 census. It is included in the Decatur, Illinois Metropolitan Statistical Area.

== History ==
The village was named in honor of Major Thomas L. Harris, who was elected and served as Major of the Fourth Illinois Regiment in the Mexican–American War, and who was afterward a member of Congress from 1849 to 1858.

The first settlers arrived in 1828 and began building log cabins and improving land around the area. 1841 saw the building of the township's first schoolhouse, a log building, and served as both the school and as a place of worship until 1853 when the first church was built. Harristown was along the main line of the Wabash Railroad, which contributed to increased population and business.

Harristown was the first Illinois home of Abraham Lincoln. His family settled alongside the Sangamon River 4 miles (6 km) south of the present village in 1830 for a little over a year before relocating due to the harsh winter and extreme sickness. Lincoln and his family constructed a log cabin and fenced in 10 acres (4.0 ha) of land, planting corn in the fenced land. During that winter, Lincoln, together with his stepmother's son, John D. Johnston, and John Hanks were hired by Denton Offutt to build a flatboat and navigate it from Beardstown, Illinois, down the Illinois and Mississippi rivers to New Orleans. It was during this time that Lincoln saw slavery first-hand for the first time.

Lincoln departed the Harristown area in the spring of 1831. Lincoln Trail Homestead State Park was created in 1904 and marks the spot where his cabin stood.

== Geography ==
Harristown is located in western Macon County. It lies within Harristown Township and is bordered to the east by the city of Decatur, the county seat. Downtown Decatur is 7 miles (11 km) to the east, while Springfield, the state capital, is 33 miles (53 km) to the west.

According to the 2021 census gazetteer files, Harristown has a total area of 1.80 square miles (4.66 km^{2}), all land. The village is drained to the south by tributaries of the Sangamon River. Abraham Lincoln's first home in Illinois was located on the north bank of the Sangamon, 4 miles (6 km) south of the present village.

== Demographics ==
Historical population
Census	Pop.	Note	%±
1970	1,253		—
1980	1,456		16.2%
1990	1,319		−9.4%
2000	1,338		1.4%
2010	1,367		2.2%
2020	1,310		−4.2%
U.S. Decennial Census

As of the 2020 census there were 1,310 people, 527 households, and 345 families residing in the village. The population density was 728.99 inhabitants per square mile (281.46/km^{2}). The racial makeup of the village was 95.04% White, 0.61% African American, 0.15% Native American, 0.38% Asian, 0.08% Pacific Islander, 0.53% from other races, and 3.21% from two or more races. Hispanic or Latino of any race were 1.15% of the population.

There were 527 households, out of which 22.4% had children under the age of 18 living with them, 53.70% were married couples living together, 9.30% had a female householder with no husband present, and 34.54% were non-families. 27.70% of all households were made up of individuals, and 11.20% had someone living alone who was 65 years of age or older. The average household size was 3.08 and the average family size was 2.46.

The village's age distribution consisted of 23.8% under the age of 18, 6.6% from 18 to 24, 18.5% from 25 to 44, 28.3% from 45 to 64, and 22.7% who were 65 years of age or older. The median age was 47.1 years. For every 100 females, there were 91.1 males. For every 100 females age 18 and over, there were 87.1 males.

The median income for a household in the village was $49,542, and the median income for a family was $67,212. Males had a median income of $54,432 versus $30,571 for females. The per capita income for the village was $26,961. About 9.0% of families and 12.6% of the population were below the poverty line, including 16.2% of those under age 18 and 9.5% of those age 65 or over.

There were 573 housing units, of which 6.1% were vacant. The homeowner vacancy rate was 1.7% and the rental vacancy rate was 5.1%.

Racial composition as of the 2020 census
Race	Number	Percent
White	1,245	95.0%
Black or African American	8	0.6%
American Indian and Alaska Native	2	0.2%
Asian	5	0.4%
Native Hawaiian and Other Pacific Islander	1	0.1%
Some other race	7	0.5%
Two or more races	42	3.2%
Hispanic or Latino (of any race)	15	1.1%

== Education ==
It is in the Sangamon Valley Community Unit School District 9.

== Notable people ==
- Cecil Garriott, MLB player for the Chicago Cubs
- Abraham Lincoln, statesman and 16th president of the United States
- Lawrence Rotz (1897–1963), Illinois state senator, businessman, and politician
