= Shire Site =

The Shire site is an archeological research site in Logan County, Illinois. The area of archeological interest is of unknown size due to private ownership. The small area of the excavated site revealed two houses, with subterranean elements, as well as a variety of ceramics and other artifacts. It is estimated that the site was occupied around 1000 AD.

The Shire site is located near a lake that is thought to have been formed during the Holocene, or present epoch. The lake is surrounded by forested areas with large trees used for timber. The lake has a slope located near its shores making it unique in the Sangamon River system it is a part of; the slope prevents archeologists from using similar methods to the areas around it as they become unreliable with this topography.

== Significance ==
A significant amount of ceramic fragments were found at the site which makes it one of only two sites, out of hundreds, by the Sangamon River system to have yielded ceramics. The ceramics found revealed that Late Woodland ceramic methods were used in forming these vessels. Additionally, there were attempts at combining two different methods of ceramic making: Late Woodland and Mississippian culture. The collection of multiple types of pottery suggest that the inhabitants at the Shire were not originally from the Sangamon River area. Though the ceramics were found within houses which would imply their function was usage, the makership of the pots are outstanding. The quality of the ceramics found suggests that they were made by someone with training and experience. Not only that but the ceramics were likely, again, brought from an area further south.

== Faunal research ==
A large amount of deer, fish, and other animal remains show that the Shire site was occupied while the lake was present and nature was thriving. Though the animals of which the remains were found can be found all year, research suggests that the site may have only been used during the summer rather than year round due to a lack of winter antler shedding found on the deer skulls.

== Takeaways ==
The Shire site was likely a trading outpost for the Mississippians with the Late Woodland area due to the unique location and the analysis of the ceramic findings. Due to the structure of the house, the site was plausibly a place of long-term residence. The variety of types of artifacts shows that the Mississippians and Late Woodland people regularly traded with each other.
