= Elwin, Illinois =

- Census-designated place
- Location within Illinois Location within the United States
- Coordinates: 39°46′34″N 88°58′39″W
- Country: United States
- State: Illinois
- County: Macon
- Township: South Wheatland

Area
  - Total: 0.83 sq mi (2.16 km^{2})
  - Land: 0.83 sq mi (2.16 km^{2})
  - Water: 0 sq mi (0.00 km^{2})
- Elevation: 715 ft (218 m)

Population (2020)
  - Total: 119
  - Density: 142.9/sq mi (55.18/km^{2})
- Time zone: UTC-6 (Central (CST))
  - Summer (DST): UTC-5 (CDT)
- ZIP Code: 62532
- FIPS code: 17-23919
- GNIS feature ID: 2806486

Elwin is an unincorporated community and census-designated place (CDP) in South Wheatland Township, Macon County, Illinois, United States. It was first listed as a CDP in 2020, with a population of 119.

== History ==
Elwin was formed in 1859 on land owned by William Martin and Daniel H. Elwood. It was laid out after completion of the railroad. The name "Elwin" is an amalgamation of the surnames of founders Elwood and Martin.

== Geography ==
Elwin is located in central Macon County. Centrally located within South Wheatland Township, it was once known as South Wheatland. It is 5 miles (8 km) south of the center of Decatur, the Macon county seat. U.S. Route 51 bypasses Elwin on its east side, with its old alignment passing through the center of the community formerly known as U.S. Route 51 Business (it was decommissioned in 2011). The two routes joined south of Elwin and lead south 30 miles (48 km) to Pana.

According to the U.S. Census Bureau, the Elwin CDP has an area of 0.83 square miles (2.15 km^{2}), all land. The community is in the Spring Creek watershed, which flows north to the Sangamon River in Decatur.

== Demographics ==
Historical population
Census	Pop.	Note	%±
2020	119		—
U.S. Decennial Census

Elwin first appeared as a census designated place in the 2020 U.S. census.

As of the 2020 census there were 119 people, 68 households, and 38 families residing in the CDP. The population density was 142.86 inhabitants per square mile (55.16/km^{2}). There were 57 housing units at an average density of 68.43 per square mile (26.42/km^{2}). The racial makeup of the CDP was 97.48% White, 0.00% African American, 0.00% Native American, 0.00% Asian, 0.00% Pacific Islander, 0.00% from other races, and 2.52% from two or more races. Hispanic or Latino of any race were 2.52% of the population.

There were 68 households, out of which 26.5% had children under the age of 18 living with them, 47.06% were married couples living together, 8.82% had a female householder with no husband present, and 44.12% were non-families. 44.12% of all households were made up of individuals, and 10.29% had someone living alone who was 65 years of age or older. The average household size was 2.97 and the average family size was 2.10.

The CDP's age distribution consisted of 20.3% under the age of 18, 0.0% from 18 to 24, 30.8% from 25 to 44, 25.9% from 45 to 64, and 23.1% who were 65 years of age or older. The median age was 42.9 years. For every 100 females, there were 58.9 males. For every 100 females age 18 and over, there were 39.0 males.

The median income for a household in the CDP was $45,833, and the median income for a family was $67,750. The per capita income for the CDP was $25,993. None of the population was below the poverty line.

== Education ==
It is a part of the Meridian Community Unit School District 15.

The district's comprehensive high school is Meridian High School.
