= Spring Creek (Macon County, Illinois) =

Stream in Macon County, Illinois, U.S.

Coordinates: 39°52′21″N 88°59′26″W

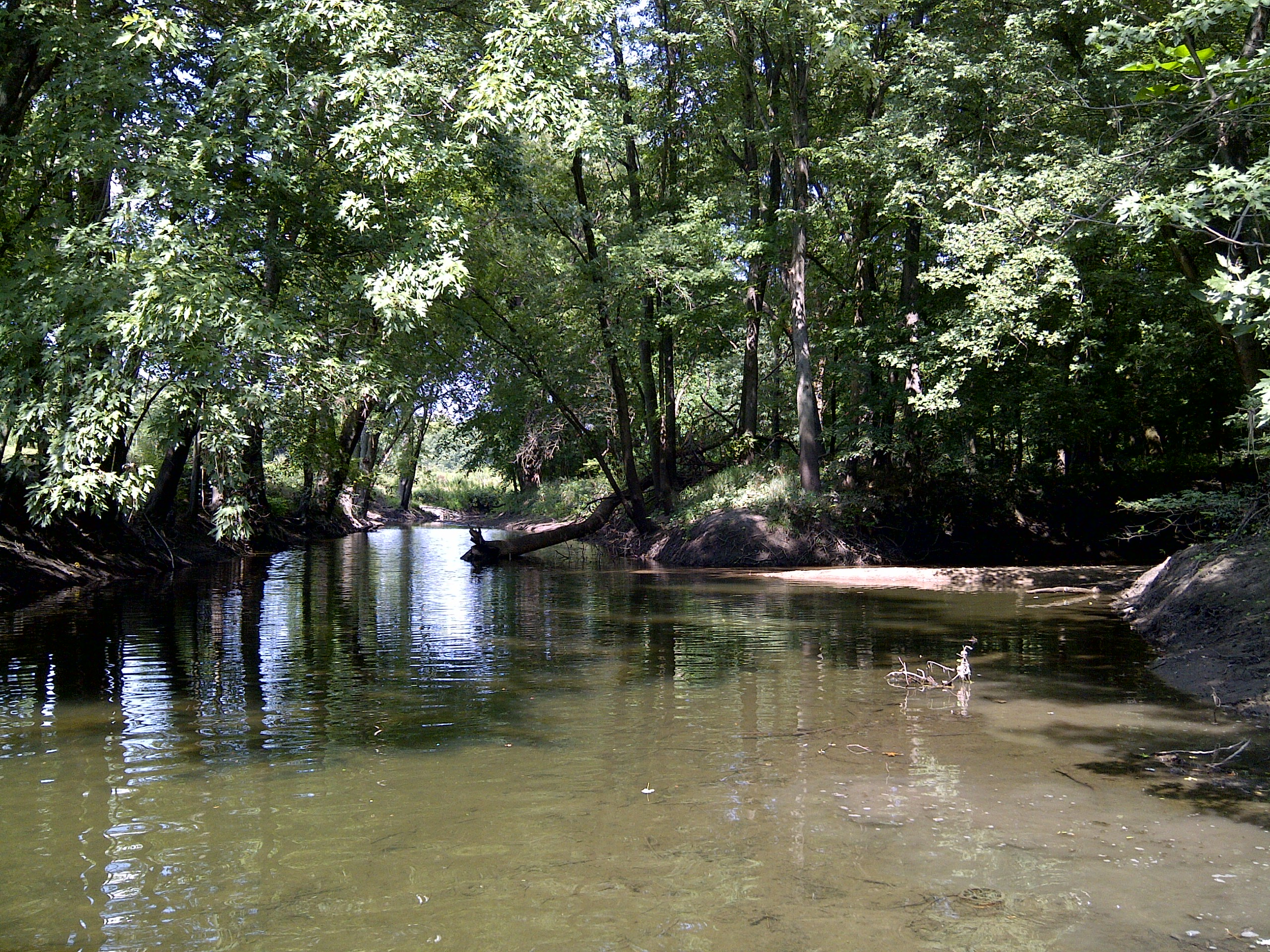
View looking NE of Spring Creek (right) flowing into Stevens Creek (left) in Macon County, IL.

Spring Creek is a stream in Macon County, Illinois. A tributary of Stevens Creek, itself a tributary of the Sangamon River, Spring Creek originates just northeast of the town of Forsyth before emptying into Stevens Creek west of Horace B. Garman Park in Decatur, Illinois.
