= South Wheatland Township, Macon County, Illinois =

South Wheatland Township
- Township
- Location in Macon County

- Macon County's location in Illinois
- Coordinates: 39°47′N 88°59′W
- Country: United States
- State: Illinois
- County: Macon
- Settlement: November 8, 1859

Area
  - Total: 28.20 sq mi (73.0 km^{2})
  - Land: 27.81 sq mi (72.0 km^{2})
  - Water: 0.39 sq mi (1.0 km^{2}) 1.39%
- Elevation: 712 ft (217 m)

Population (2020)
  - Total: 4,040
  - Density: 145/sq mi (56.1/km^{2})
- Time zone: UTC-6 (CST)
  - Summer (DST): UTC-5 (CDT)
- FIPS code: 17-115-71357

South Wheatland Township is located in Macon County, Illinois, south of Decatur. As of the 2020 census, its population was 4,040 and it contained 1,841 housing units. The South Wheatland Fire Protection District consists of 5 officers; 1 Chief, 1 Asst. Chief, 1 Captain, and 2 Lieutenants, and 14 Firefighters, as well as 3 members on the Board of Trustees.

== Cities and towns ==
- Elwin

== Adjacent townships ==
- Decatur Township (north)
- Long Creek Township (northeast)
- Mount Zion Township (east)
- Milam Township (east and southeast)
- South Macon Township (south)
- Blue Mound Township (southwest and west)
- Harristown Township (northwest)

== Geography ==
South Wheatland Township is the location of the Sand Creek Conservation Area, a 755-acre (3 km^{2}) natural area and park property of the Macon County Conservation District. According to the 2021 census gazetteer files, South Wheatland Township has a total area of 28.20 square miles (73.04 km^{2}), of which 27.81 square miles (72.03 km^{2}) (or 98.61%) is land and 0.39 square miles (1.01 km^{2}) (or 1.39%) is water.

== Demographics ==
As of the 2020 census there were 4,040 people, 1,679 households, and 1,158 families residing in the township. The population density was 143.27 inhabitants per square mile (55.32/km^{2}). There were 1,841 housing units at an average density of 65.29 per square mile (25.21/km^{2}). The racial makeup of the township was 93.09% White, 1.49% African American, 0.10% Native American, 0.37% Asian, 0.00% Pacific Islander, 0.87% from other races, and 4.08% from two or more races. Hispanic or Latino of any race were 2.30% of the population.

There were 1,679 households, out of which 19.60% had children under the age of 18 living with them, 58.67% were married couples living together, 5.72% had a female householder with no spouse present, and 31.03% were non-families. 25.70% of all households were made up of individuals, and 13.40% had someone living alone who was 65 years of age or older. The average household size was 2.35 and the average family size was 2.76.

According to the 2020 American Community Survey, township's age distribution consisted of 15.1% under the age of 18, 8.0% from 18 to 24, 20.5% from 25 to 44, 28.4% from 45 to 64, and 28.1% who were 65 years of age or older. The median age was 51.2 years. For every 100 females, there were 100.2 males. For every 100 females age 18 and over, there were 97.4 males.

The median income for a household in the township was $75,380, and the median income for a family was $82,143. Males had a median income of $58,339 versus $42,879 for females. The per capita income for the township was $36,880. About 3.7% of families and 5.9% of the population were below the poverty line, including 8.6% of those under age 18 and 7.0% of those age 65 or over.

Historical population
Census	Pop.	Note	%±
2000	4,185		—
2010	4,143		−1.0%
2020	4,040		−2.5%
U.S. Decennial Census
