= Rock Springs Conservation Area =

Coordinates: 39.8245°N 89.0128°W

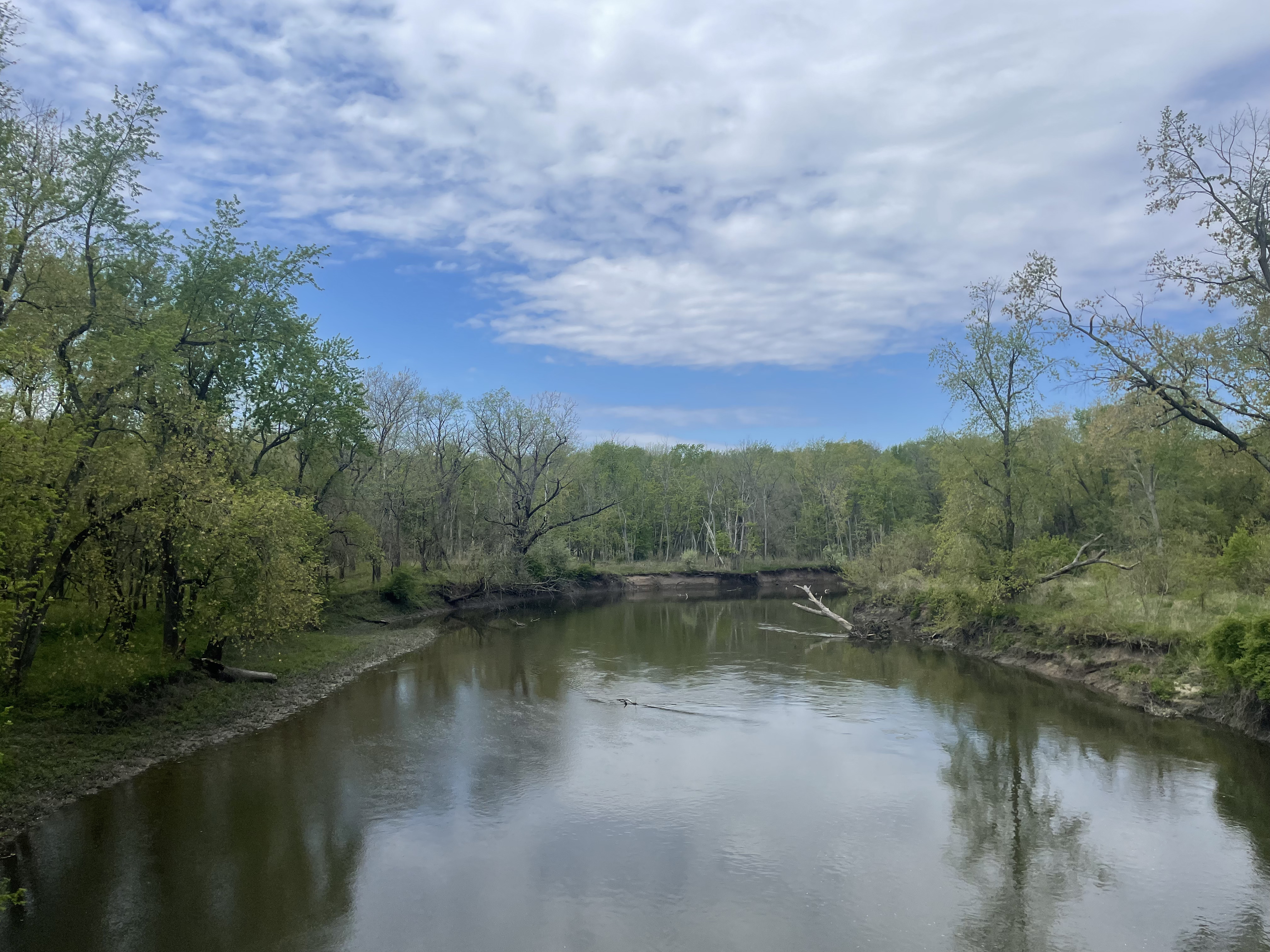
The Sangamon River flowing through Rock Springs Conservation Area

Rock Springs Conservation Area is a 1,300 acre (5 km^{2}) park located 4 miles (6.5 km) southwest of Decatur, Illinois. Centering on the Rock Spring Nature Center, a small environmental-education museum and community center, it is the largest parcel of parkland, in terms of surface area, in Macon County. The conservation area and nature center are operated by the Macon County Conservation District.

Rock Spring is a natural outflow of water from the sandstone bluffs on the south bank of the Sangamon River. The spring was a meeting point for local Native Americans. Around 1915 and 1916 a bottling plant bottled spring water for sale to local merchants. Only ruins of the building remain today. Nearby is Miller's Mill, the site of a 19th-century gristmill that ground local maize into cornmeal. There is an informational kiosk on the trail overlooking the mill site which tells the history of the mill.

The area surrounding the springs consists of Sangamon River wetlands and low bluffs of marginal agricultural productivity. As the population of Decatur grew sharply in the early 20th century, large parcels of land alongside the Sangamon were condemned so that the metropolis could build a modern sewage plant. More than two square miles of land around and downstream from the plant was redesignated as a nature center and buffer zone. Six miles (10 km) of nature trails provide access to the conservation area. Largely wooded, parts of the conservation area have been planted as restoration tallgrass prairie.

The current Rock Springs Conservation Area and Nature Center are the products of this urban-planning initiative. The center is operated by the Macon County Conservation District.

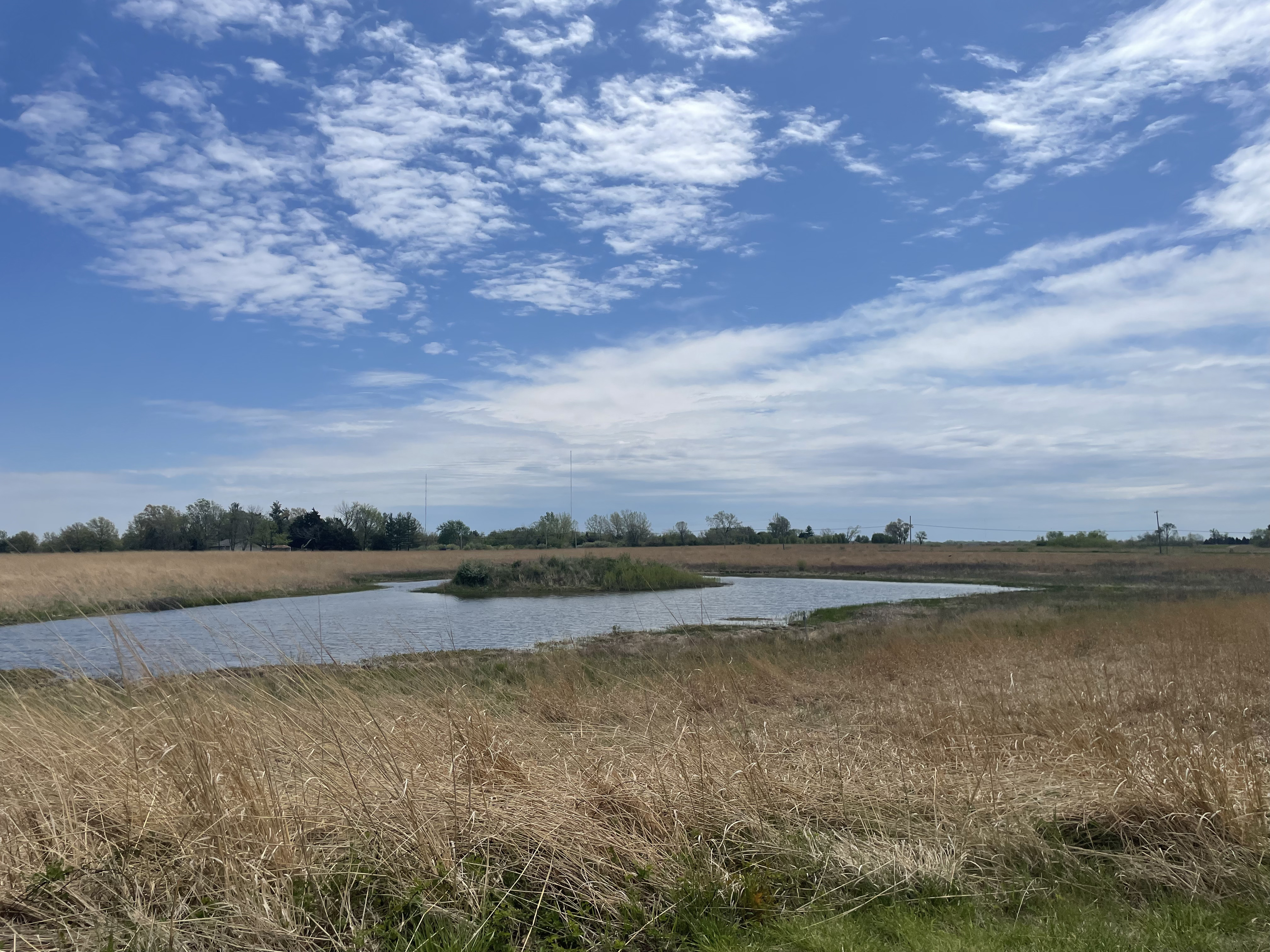
The Rodney T. Miller Wetland in the southeast corner of the conservation area

The nearest major highway is Illinois Route 48, southwest of Decatur.
