= Salt Creek (Sangamon River tributary) =

Physical characteristics
- Source
  - location: McLean County west of Saybrook, Illinois
  - coordinates: 40°25′17″N 88°34′00″W
- Mouth
  - location: Confluence with the Sangamon River, Mason County, Illinois
  - coordinates: 40°07′33″N 89°49′32″W
  - elevation: 469 ft (143 m)
- Length: 112 mi (180 km)
- Discharge
  - location: Greenview, Illinois
  - average: 1,386 cu/ft. per sec.

Basin features
- Progression: Salt Creek → Sangamon → Illinois → Mississippi → Gulf of Mexico
- GNIS ID: 426594

Salt Creek is a major tributary to the Sangamon River, which it joins at the boundary between Mason and Menard County, Illinois. There are at least two other Salt Creeks in Illinois, Salt Creek (Des Plaines River Tributary), and in Effingham County, Illinois.

Salt Creek is about 110 miles (180 km) in length. From its headwaters near Saybrook, Illinois, it runs generally westward to the main stem of the Sangamon near Greenview. The largest lake formed by Salt Creek is Clinton Lake near Clinton, which provides cooling water for the Clinton Nuclear Generating Station. The lower reaches of Salt Creek at one time formed the boundary between Mason and Menard counties. This stretch has been channelized so that the modern route of the creek only approximates the actual county line. The major tributaries of Salt Creek include Sugar Creek, Kickapoo Creek, and the North Fork of Salt Creek.

== Cities, towns and counties ==
The following cities, towns and villages are drained by Salt Creek:

- Armington
- Atlanta
- Bloomington
- Clinton
- Downs
- Emden
- Farmer City
- Greenview
- Hartsburg
- Heyworth
- LeRoy
- Lincoln
- Mason City
- McLean
- Minier
- Mt. Pulaski
- Wapella
- Waynesville

The following Illinois counties are partly within the Salt Creek watershed:

- DeWitt
- Logan
- Mason
- McLean
- Menard
- Piatt
- Sangamon
- Tazewell

== Parks and access points ==
- Clinton Lake State Recreation Area
- Edward R. Madigan State Fish and Wildlife Area
- Kickapoo Creek County Park
- Moraine View State Recreation Area
- Weldon Springs State Park

== See also ==
- List of Illinois rivers
