= Stevens Creek (Illinois) =

Stream in Macon County, Illinois, U.S.

Coordinates: 39°50′2″N 89°0′26″W

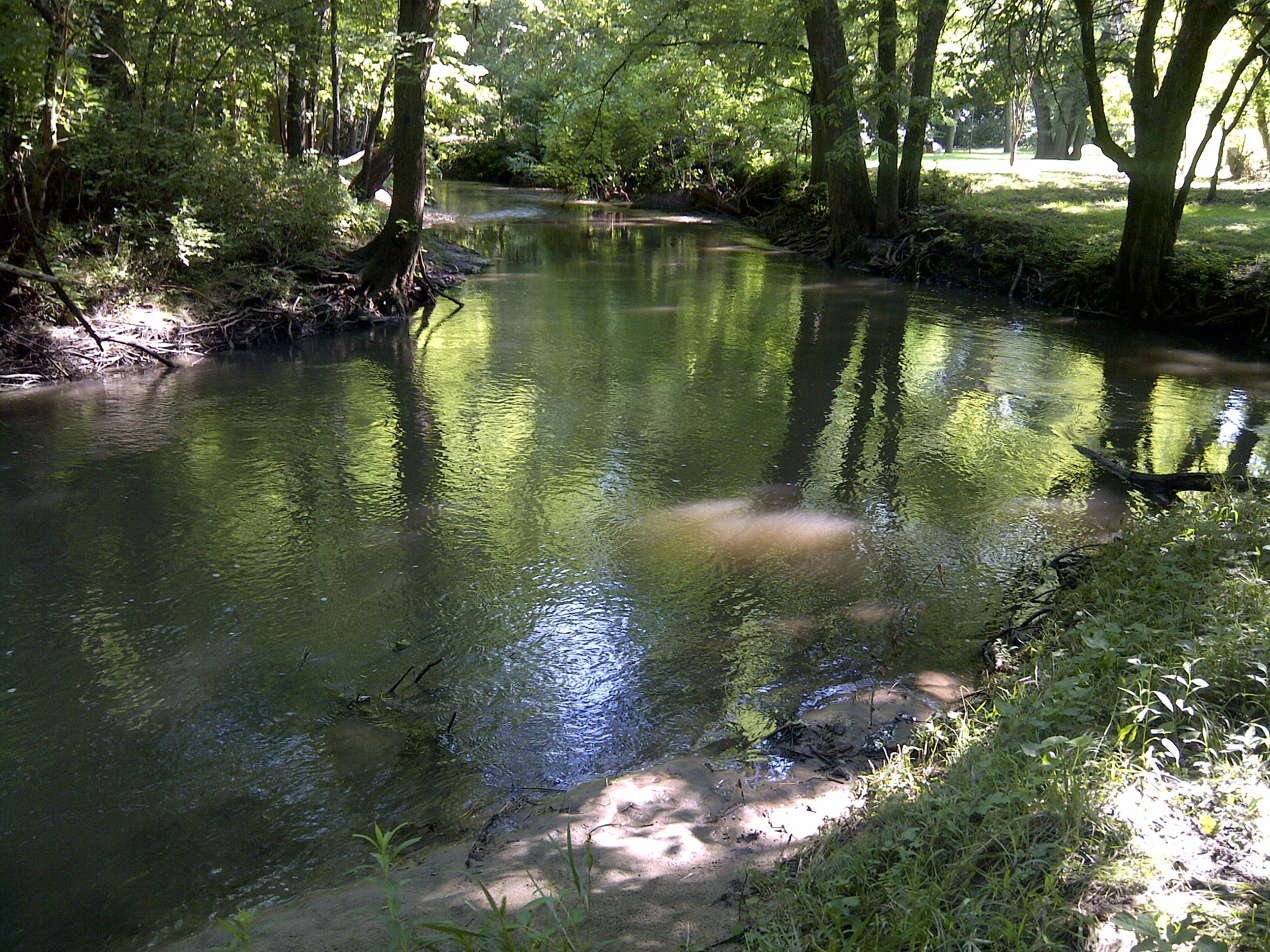
Stevens Creek in central Macon County, Illinois, July 2013.

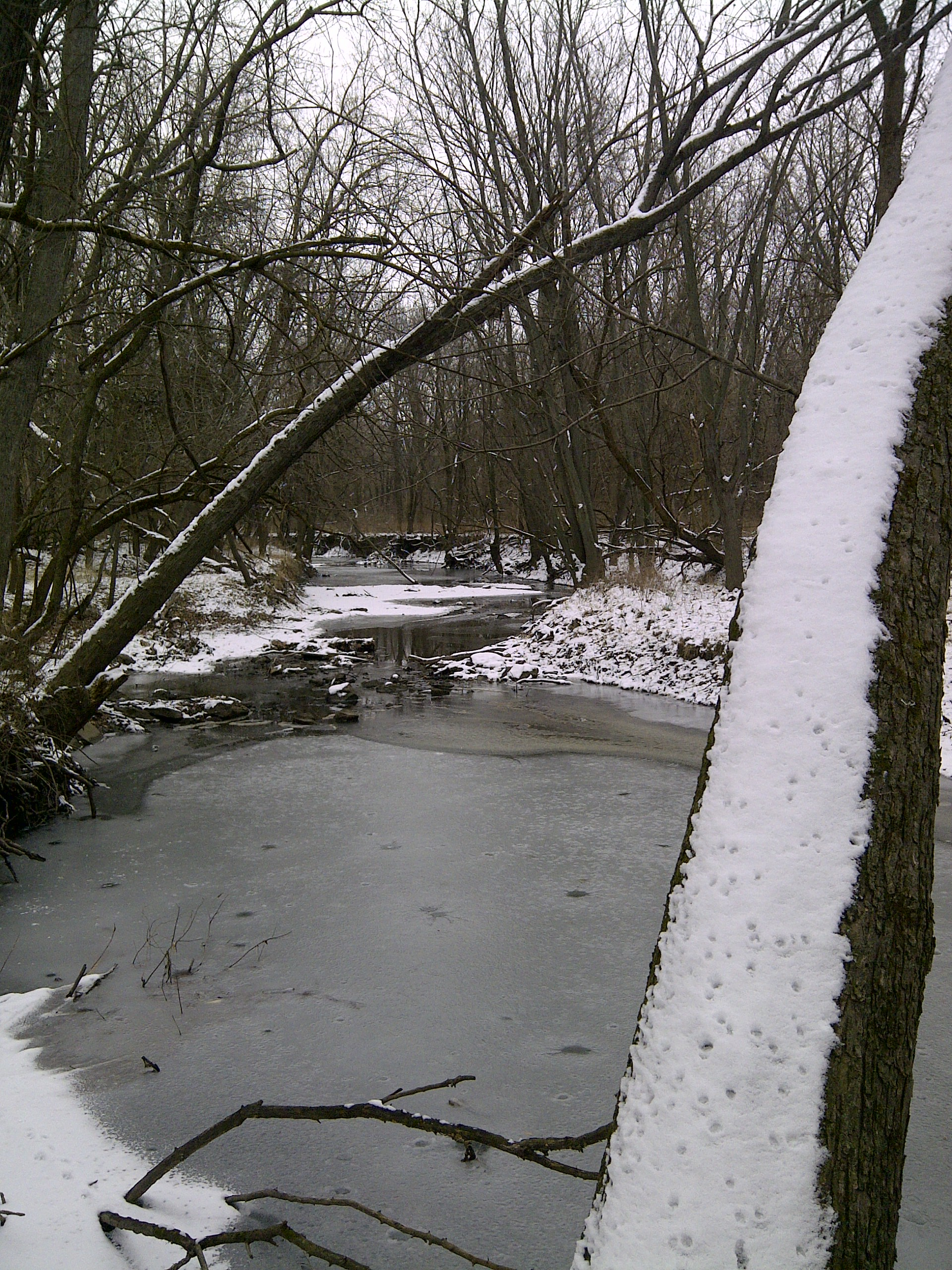
Stevens Creek in central Macon County, Illinois, January 2013.

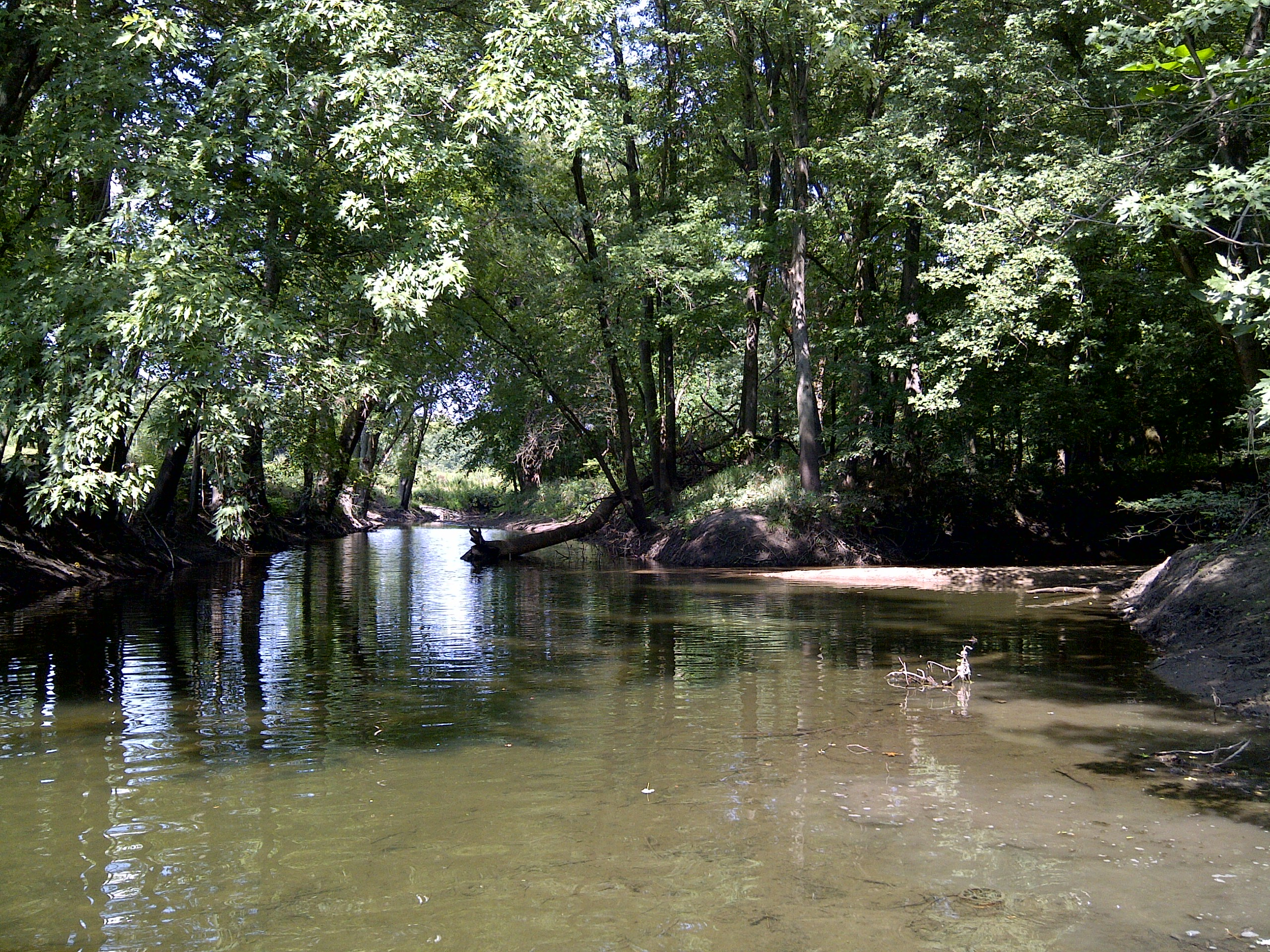
View looking NE of Spring Creek (right) flowing into Stevens Creek (left) in Macon County, IL.

Stevens Creek is a stream in Macon County, Illinois, United States. A tributary of the Sangamon River, it originates in the northern part of the county, flowing southward through the village of Forsyth and city of Decatur before emptying into the Sangamon near the western boundaries of Decatur. For much of its path through the city, it is paralleled by a bike trail. Its principal tributary is Spring Creek, which joins it a few miles before Stevens joins the Sangamon. Its drainage area covers 87 square miles of Macon County.

== Tributaries ==
- Spring Creek
- Stevens Creek Tributary A
- Stevens Creek Tributary B
