= Lawrence Rotz =

American businessman, educator, and politician

William Lawrence Rotz, Sr. (June 8, 1897–September 29, 1963) was an American businessman, educator, and politician.

Rotz was born in Harristown, Illinois, He graduated from Decatur High School, in Decatur, Illinois and Millikin University in 1920. He also went to Bradley University, University of Notre Dame and University of Wisconsin–Madison. Rotz was a high school teacher and coach with several high schools in Decatur, Newman, and Chrisman, Illinois. Rotz lived in Decatur, Illinois with his wife and family. He was also involved in the insurance business. Rotz served in the Illinois Senate from 1945 to 1949 and was a Republican. Rotz died at the Decatur and Marion Hospital in Decatur, Illinois.
