= Moraine View State Recreation Area =

State park in Illinois, United States

- IUCN category V (protected landscape/seascape)
- Location within Illinois Location within the United States
- Location: McLean County, Illinois, United States
- Nearest city: Le Roy, Illinois
- Coordinates: 40°24′41″N 88°43′56″W
- Area: 1,687 acres (683 ha)
- Established: 1959
- Governing body: Illinois Department of Natural Resources

The Moraine View State Recreation Area is a state park operated by the Department of Natural Resources (DNR) of the U.S. state of Illinois. The 1,687 acre (6.7 km^{2}) recreation area is located near Le Roy, Illinois.

The predecessor of Moraine View, the McLean County Conservation Area, traces its history to 1959. The park was renamed Moraine View State Park in 1975, then Moraine View State Recreation Area in 1995. It is managed for active recreation, including camping, hiking, swimming, boating, hunting and fishing. Camping available includes Class A sites with electricity and nearby modern toilet and shower facilities, to group camps and primitive backpacking sites. Hunters use the park for whitetail deer, pheasant, and wild turkey.

Moraine View was one of eleven state parks slated to close indefinitely on November 1, 2008 due to budget cuts by former Illinois governor Rod Blagojevich. It reopened to the public on February 26, 2009.

== Dawson Lake ==
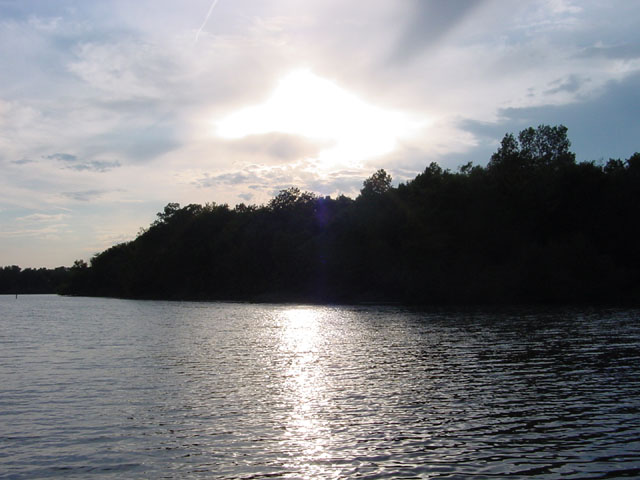
Another view of Dawson Lake, north end.

The centerpiece of Moraine View is the 158 acre (0.6 km^{2}) Dawson Lake, an artificial reservoir built in 1962-1963. Fish stocked in the lake by the DNR include largemouth bass, bluegill (the state fish of Illinois), sunfish, bullhead, crappie, channel catfish, walleye, yellow perch and northern pike.

== Geology ==
Moraine View State Recreation Area is located atop a moraine, a low, rolling ridge located where a vanished ice sheet dumped ground rock and till while melting. Moraines are common post-glacial geological features, and can be found throughout the U.S. Midwest. This moraine was produced by the Wisconsin glaciation, about 70,000 to 10,000 years before present.

Moraine View SRA is the headwaters for Salt Creek, a major tributary of the Sangamon River, one of the largest rivers in central Illinois. The northeastern face of the same moraine, outside the state recreation area, is the headwaters of the main stem of the Sangamon. Although Salt Creek and the main stem of the Sangamon arise on opposite sides of this moraine, they flow more than 80 miles (130 km) west before they meet again.

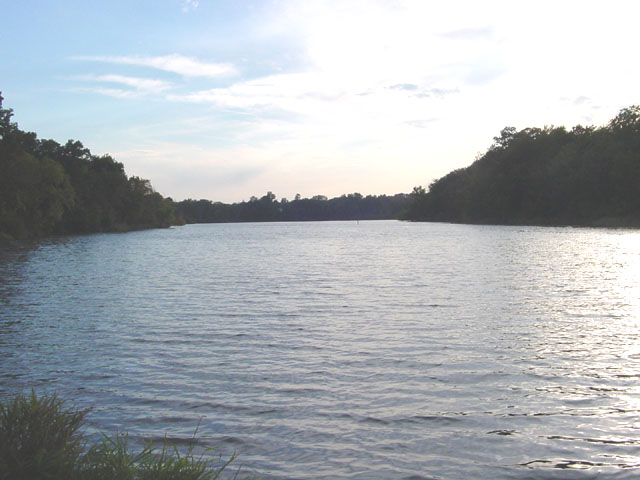
View of Dawson Lake, north end.

== 2008 closing ==
Moraine View State Recreation Area was one of eleven state parks slated to close indefinitely on November 1, 2008 due to budget cuts by former Illinois governor Rod Blagojevich. After delay, which restored funding for some of the parks, a proposal to close seven state parks and a dozen state historic sites, including Moraine View, went ahead on November 30, 2008. After the Illinois Governor Blagojevich was impeached and removed from office, new governor Pat Quinn reopened the closed state parks in February.
