= Cecil Garriott =

American baseball player (1916–1990)

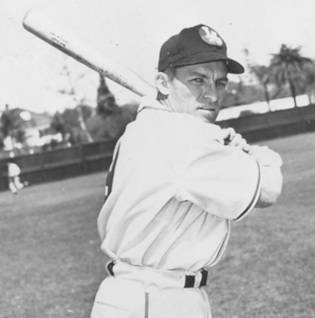
- Pinch hitter
- Born: August 15, 1916; Harristown, Illinois, U.S.
- Died: February 20, 1990 (aged 73); Lake Elsinore, California, U.S.
- Batted: Left Threw: Right

MLB debut
- September 4, 1946, for the Chicago Cubs

Last MLB appearance
- September 24, 1946, for the Chicago Cubs

MLB statistics
- Games played: 6
- At bats: 5
- Hits: 0
- Stats at Baseball Reference

Teams
- Chicago Cubs (1946)

Virgil Cecil Garriott (August 15, 1916 – February 20, 1990) was an American professional baseball player during the middle of the 20th century. An outfielder during his long career in minor league baseball, Garriott made six appearances as a pinch hitter at the Major League level for the Chicago Cubs in 1946.

Garriott was born in Harristown, Illinois, and graduated in the class of 1934 of Argenta High School, Argenta, Illinois. He attended Millikin University.

He batted left-handed and threw right-handed, stood 5 feet 8 inches (1.73 m) tall and weighed 165 pounds (75 kg). His professional playing career lasted for 17 seasons (1936–1944; 1946–1953), interrupted by service in the United States Army during World War II.

Garriott's Major League trial came at the end of the 1946 season. In six plate appearances, he reached base once when he was hit by a pitch thrown by Marv Grissom of the New York Giants on September 18. He scored his only MLB run that day during the Cubs' 4–3 victory at the Polo Grounds.
