= Downs Township, McLean County, Illinois =

Coordinates: 40°20′19″N 88°51′56″W

Downs Township
- Township
- Location in McLean County

- McLean County's location in Illinois
- Country: United States
- State: Illinois
- County: McLean
- Established: May 17, 1858

Area
  - Total: 49.48 sq mi (128.2 km^{2})
  - Land: 49.47 sq mi (128.1 km^{2})
  - Water: 0.01 sq mi (0.026 km^{2}) 0.02%

Population (2010)
  - Estimate (2016): 1,238
  - Density: 25.6/sq mi (9.9/km^{2})
- Time zone: UTC-6 (CST)
  - Summer (DST): UTC-5 (CDT)
- FIPS code: 17-113-20656

Downs Township is located in McLean County, Illinois. At the 2010 census, its population was 1,266 and it contained 483 housing units. Downs Township was originally named Savanna Township, but it was changed on May 17, 1858.

== Geography ==
According to the 2010 census, the township has a total area of 49.48 square miles (128.2 km^{2}), of which 49.47 square miles (128.1 km^{2}) (or 99.98%) is land and 0.01 square miles (0.026 km^{2}) (or 0.02%) is water.

== Demographics ==
Historical population
Census	Pop.	Note	%±
2016 (est.)	1,238
U.S. Decennial Census
