= Kickapoo Creek (McLean County, Illinois) =

Stream in Illinois, United States

Coordinates: 40°07′46″N 89°27′08″W

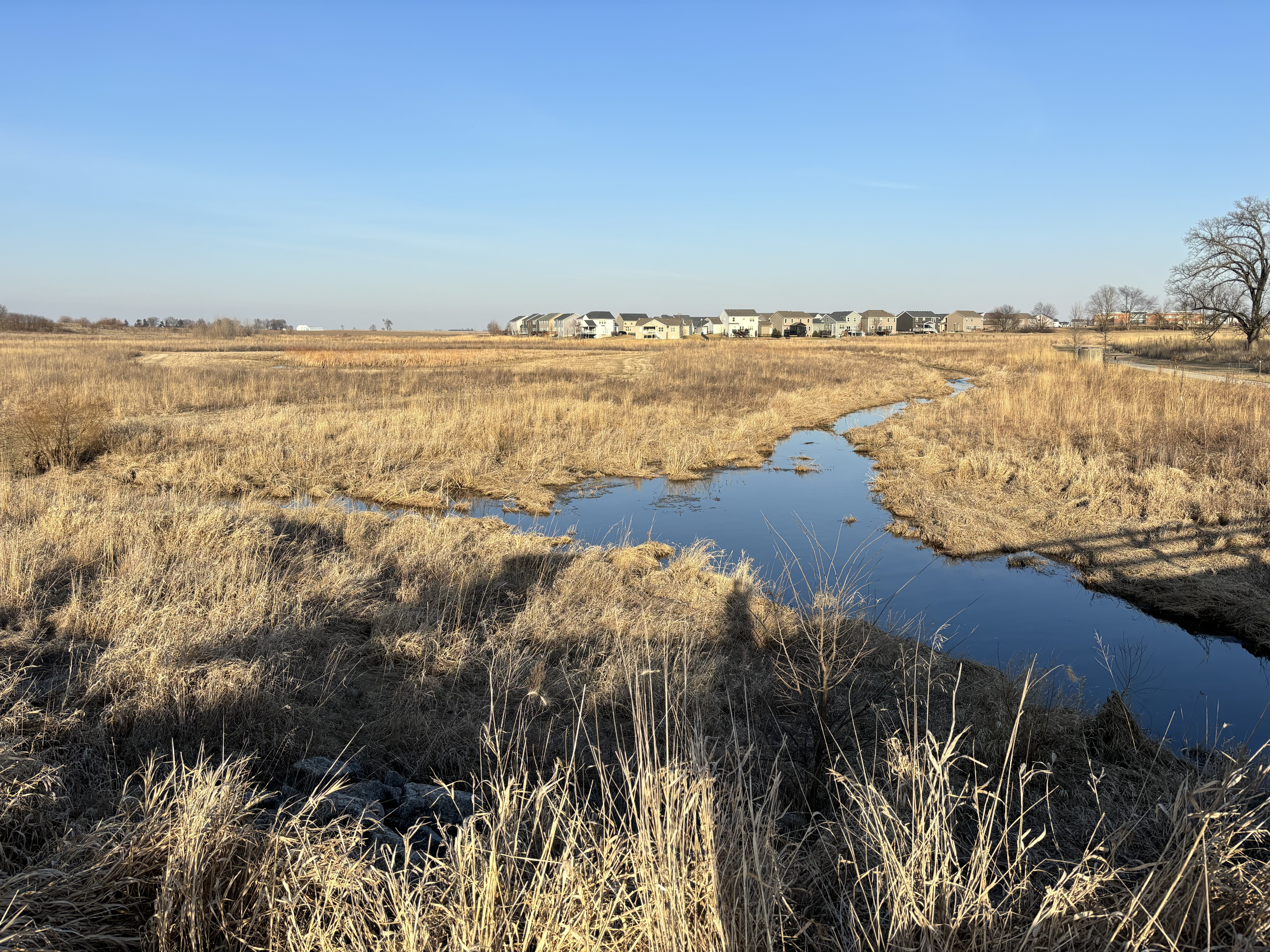
View from a pedestrian bridge near the origin of the Kickapoo Creek in McLean County

Kickapoo Creek originates in McLean County, near Bentown, Illinois and the Benjaminville Historic Site. The creek eventually joins Salt Creek in Logan County, Illinois which also makes it a tributary of the Sangamon, Illinois, and Mississippi rivers.

The creek has seen substantial restoration efforts, including the 450 acres of native Illinois prairie and wetlands that have been revitalized in the center of the Grove on Kickapoo Creek subdivision in Bloomington. The prairie serves as a natural means of controlling stormwater and preserving the land, making it a significant ecological feature of the neighborhood.

According to the USGS station at Waynesville, Illinois, Kickapoo Creek has an annual discharge of 183 cubic feet per second.
