= Lincoln Trail Homestead State Memorial =

State park in Illinois, USA

Lincoln Trail Homestead State Park and Memorial
- Location within Illinois Location within the United States
- Location: Macon County, Illinois, USA
- Nearest city: Harristown, Illinois
- Coordinates: 39°48′10″N 89°06′03″W
- Area: 162 acres (66 ha)
- Established: 1938
- Governing body: Illinois Department of Natural Resources

The Lincoln Trail Homestead State Park and Memorial is a 162-acre (66 ha) state park located on the Sangamon River in Macon County near Harristown, Illinois, United States.

== Home of Lincoln family ==
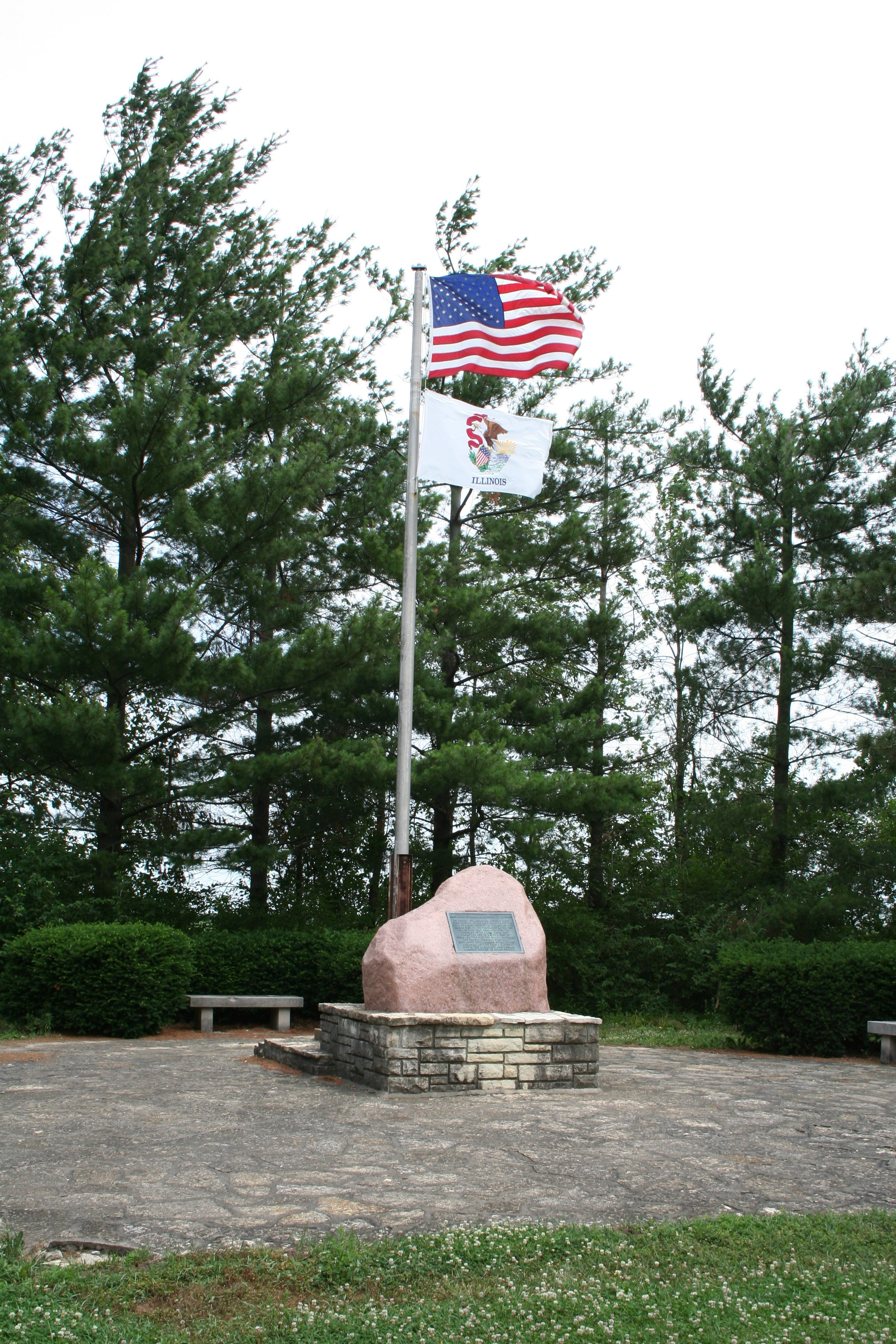
A marker at the site of Lincoln's first home in Illinois.

The state memorial is believed to contain the site of the homestead, from March 1830 until March 1831, of pioneer Thomas Lincoln and about 12 members of his extended family, including grown son Abraham Lincoln.

The Lincolns moved to this location, west of Decatur, Illinois, from Indiana in March 1830. Using local logs, they constructed a 18-by-18-foot (5.5 m × 5.5 m) log cabin on the site. It was here that Abraham split rails for his father's 10-acre (4.0 ha) field, and also "hired out" to split rails for neighboring pioneer farmers, inspiring his later political nickname, the Rail Splitter. Split-rail fences were used by pioneer farmers to confine their stock, or to prevent free-range livestock from getting into and damaging a crop field.

The settlement was not successful. The Lincoln family's corn crop produced a disappointing yield, partly because it was planted directly in the sod of the tallgrass prairie, and many of the members of the family then developed severe cases of malaria associated with living in the Illinois wetlands. Following this came the winter of 1830–1831, known to pioneers as the Winter of the Deep Snow. It was a particularly harsh winter for the area, with lengthy periods of sub-zero temperatures and snowfall totalling 6 feet (180 cm). The Lincoln clan faced serious hunger. According to one report, "Abraham rode to nearby homes seeking food for his family."

The hard winter and miserable conditions broke up the Lincoln family. In March 1831, Thomas Lincoln and his wife Sarah Bush Lincoln, Abraham's stepmother, moved southeast to Coles County; they eventually built a new farmstead at what is now the Lincoln Log Cabin State Historic Site near Charleston, Illinois. Young Abraham hired out as a flatboatman, on the Sangamon, locating a new home for himself in New Salem, Illinois. See also: Abraham Lincoln's early life and career.

== Afterwards ==
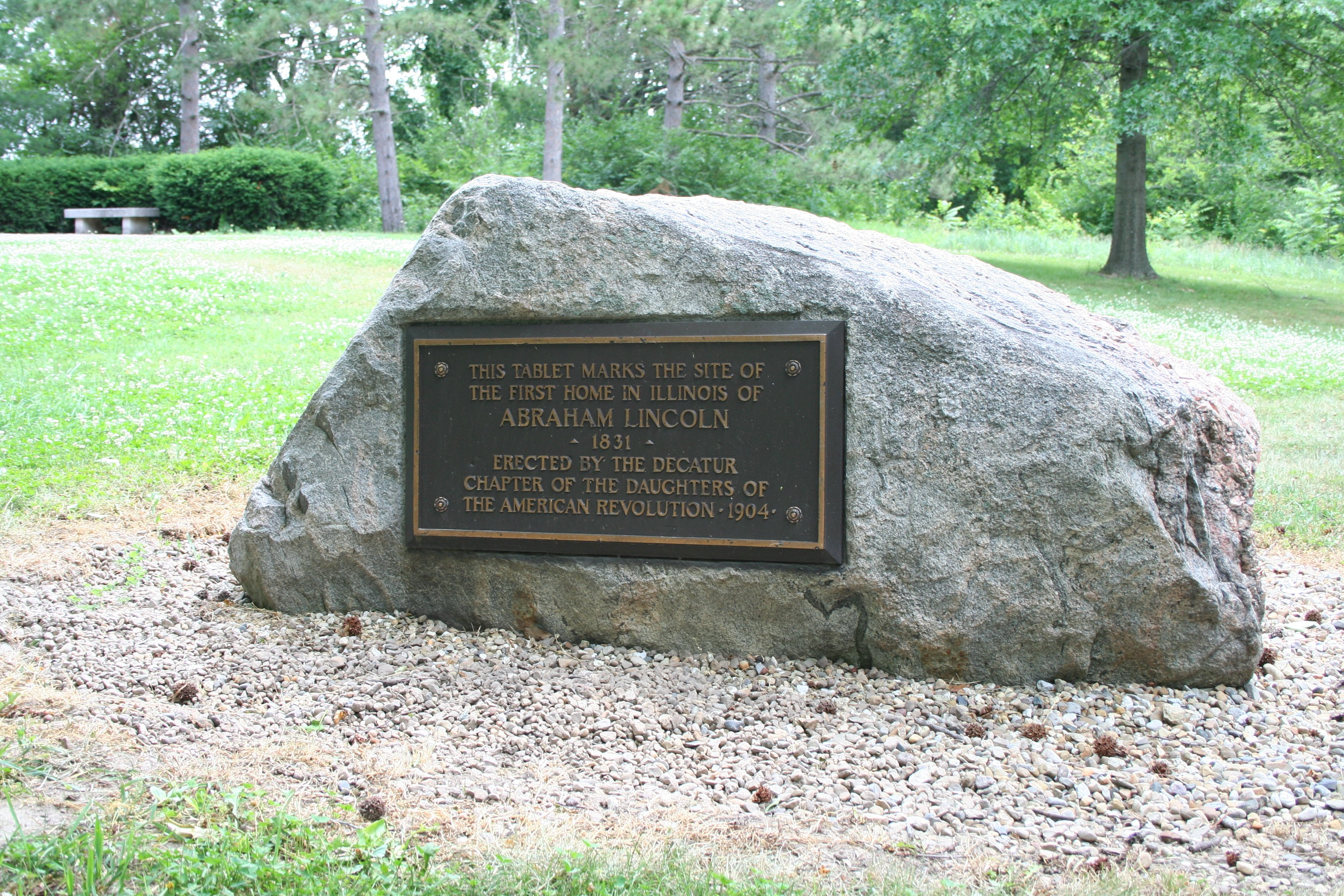
A tablet marking Lincoln's First Home in Illinois

The abandoned Lincoln cabin remained on the site and was re-used as a school house and a farm building. It was ignored until 1865 when it was dismantled and shipped for public viewing to Chicago; Boston Common; and finally the private museum in New York City operated by showman P.T. Barnum. After that, the cabin was lost to history and its ultimate fate is unknown.

The abandoned Lincoln farmstead was later settled by the Whitley family, who lived at the site for several generations; the Whiteleys built a dam across the Sangamon River to power a small flour mill.

The state memorial, created in 1938 on the Whitley site, now serves as a park and picnic area for the greater Decatur, Illinois metropolitan area. The park contains mature second-growth bottomland timber, including black walnut trees; the Whitleys' pioneer cemetery; and the remains of the flour mill and dam on the Sangamon River. The park was formally dedicated in 1957.

Archeologists have not yet discovered any evidence of the exact location of the Lincoln family's 1830–1831 cabin, and the cabin may have been located within or slightly outside the state memorial boundary.

== Lincoln's description ==
Abraham Lincoln himself described his life at the Lincoln Trail Homestead State Park and Memorial in this 1860 account, which he wrote for John L. Scripps of the Chicago Press and Tribune to be used as a campaign biography:

March 1, 1830, Abraham having just completed his twenty-first year, his father and family, with the families of the two daughters and sons-in-law of his stepmother, left the old homestead in Indiana and came to Illinois. Their mode of conveyance was wagons drawn by ox-teams, and Abraham drove one of the teams. They reached the county of Macon, and stopped there some time within the same month of March. His father and family settled a new place on the north side of the Sangamon River, at the junction of the timberland and prairie, about ten miles (16 km) westerly from Decatur. Here they built a log cabin, into which they removed, and made sufficient of rails to fence ten acres of ground, fenced and broke the ground, and raised a crop of sown corn upon it the same year. These are, or are supposed to be, the rails about which so much is being said just now, though these are far from being the first or only rails ever made by Abraham.

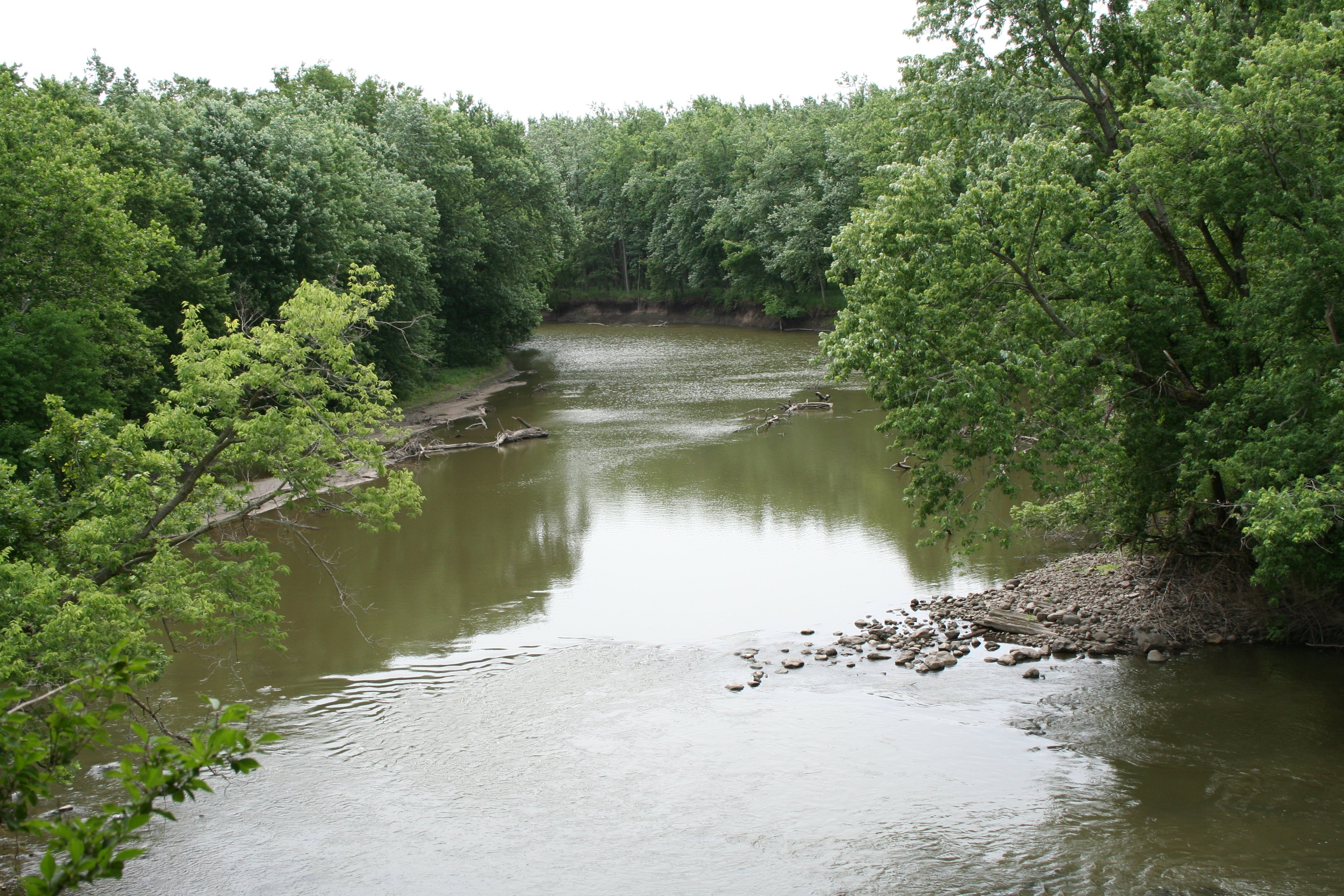
The Sangamon River passing through the park and the remains of the Mill and dam at bottom. Viewed about 200 feet (61 m) south of the monument from the top of the bluff.
