= Macon County Conservation District =

Coordinates: 39°49′25″N 89°0′53″W

The Macon County Conservation District (MCCD) is a public park authority, created in 1966, serving the metropolitan area of Decatur in the U.S. state of Illinois. The conservation district operates five conservation areas and six historic sites, as of 2022, throughout Macon County. Facilities include the park district's flagship open space, Rock Springs Conservation Area; a nature center within the Conservation Area, the Rock Springs Nature Center; and an Illinois Nature Preserve, the Bois du Sangamon by Lake Decatur.

== Current events ==
The District continues to add to the lands under its operational management. In August 2022, a private-sector donor awarded a $2.9 million grant to the MCCD to enable a 236-acre land acquisition adjacent to the existing Fort Daniel Conservation Area.
