= Sangamon River =

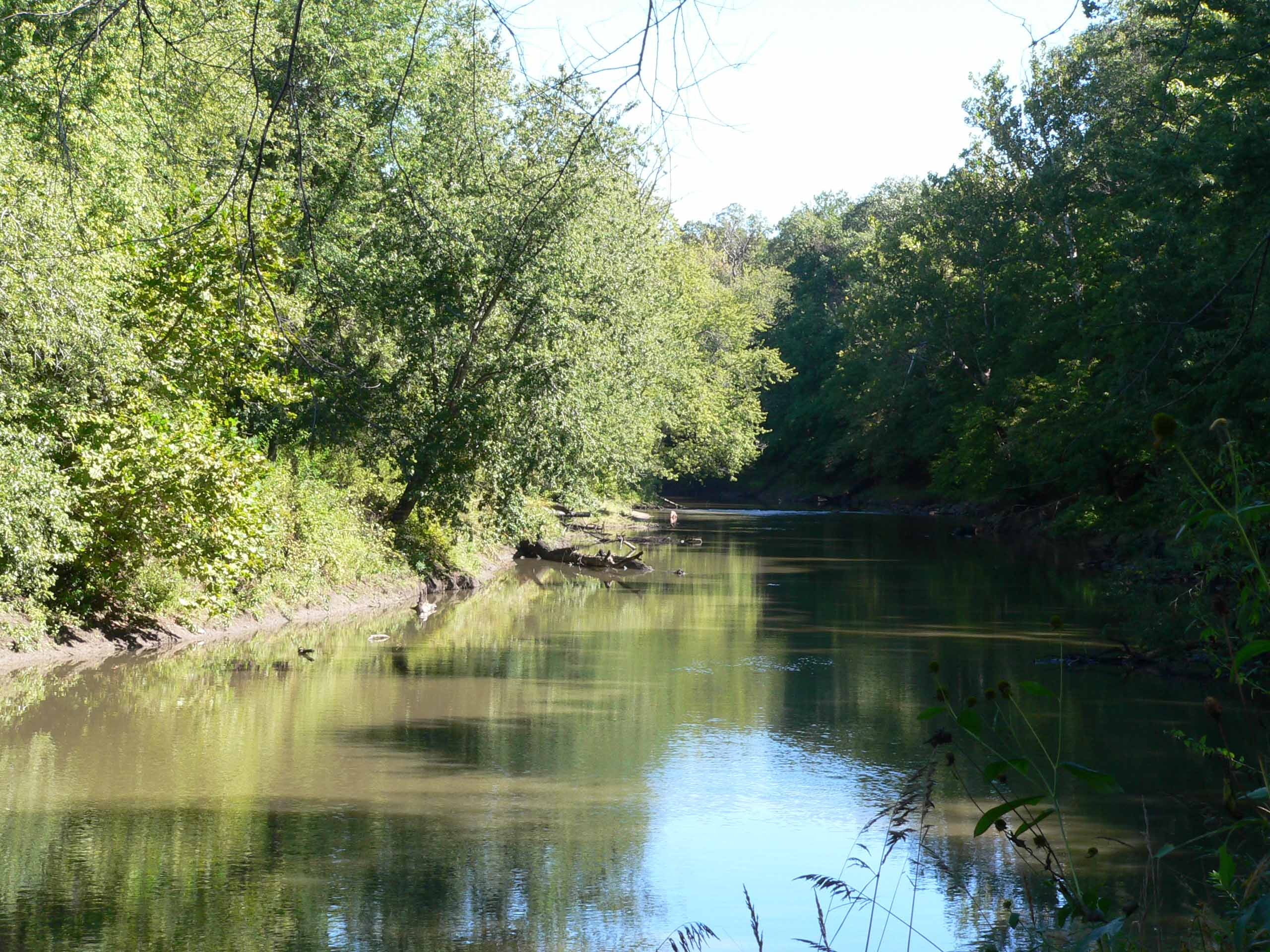
- The Sangamon River near Decatur.

Location
- Country: United States

Physical characteristics
- Source
  - location: Southern McLean County, Illinois
  - coordinates: 40°26′43.12″N 88°43′57.24″W
- Mouth
  - location: Illinois River at Beardstown, Illinois
  - coordinates: 40°1′21.17″N 90°25′58.45″W
- Length: 246 mi (396 km)
- Discharge
  - location: Oakford, Illinois
  - average: 3,639 cu/ft. per sec.

Basin features
- Progression: Illinois River — Mississippi River
- River system: Mississippi River
- Tributaries
  - right: Salt Creek
- GNIS ID: 421688

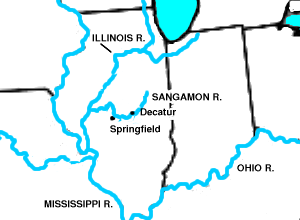
Sangamon River

The Sangamon River (Note: /ˈsæŋəmən/ SANG-ə-mən) is a principal tributary of the Illinois River, approximately 246 miles (396 km) long, in central Illinois in the United States. It drains a mostly rural agricultural area and runs through Decatur and past Springfield. The river is associated with the early career of Abraham Lincoln, who was a sometime boatman working on the river, and played an important role in early European settlement of Illinois, when the area around was known as the "Sangamon River Country". The section of the Sangamon River that flows through Robert Allerton Park near Monticello was named a National Natural Landmark in 1971.

== Description ==
The river rises from several short headstreams in southern McLean County that arise from a glacial moraine southeast of Bloomington-Normal, Illinois. The head/start of the river is located just north of Ellsworth Illinois. Part of the moraine is publicly owned as the Moraine View State Recreation Area. The river's course forms a large arc through central Illinois, first flowing east into Champaign County, Illinois, south through Mahomet, then west through Monticello and Decatur, then turning northwest to flow along the north side of Springfield. It receives Salt Creek at 40°7′33.24″N 89°49′30.36″W, approximately 25 miles (40 km) north-northwest of Springfield; then the river turns west, forming the southern boundary of Mason County with Menard and Cass counties. It joins the Illinois River from the east just north of Beardstown.

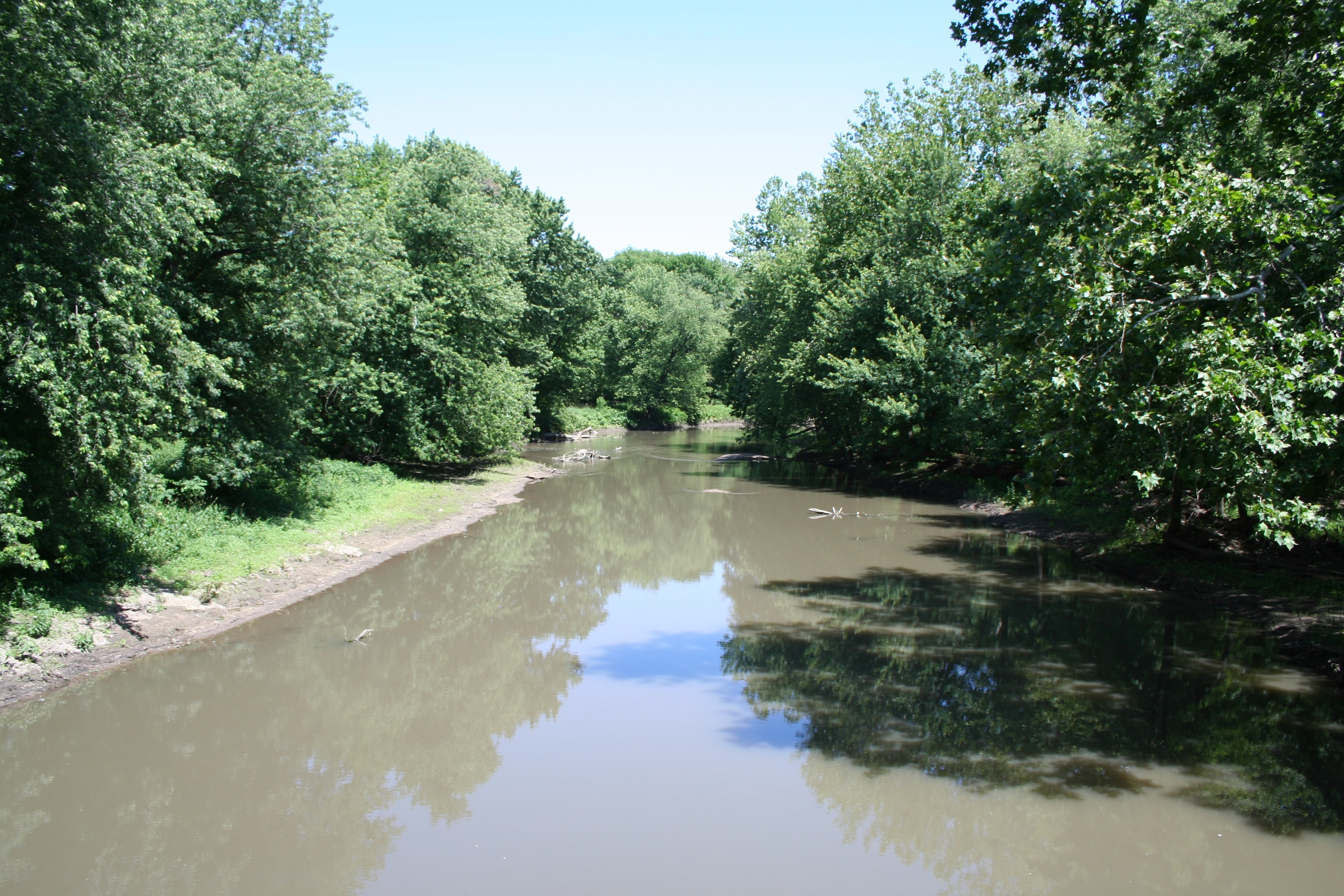
The Sangamon River in Lake of the Woods Forest Preserve.

The Sangamon is impounded in Decatur to form Lake Decatur, constructed in 1920–1922 to provide a water supply for Decatur. This lake, formed by damming the main stem of the river, with no control over upstream land uses, has had major problems with siltation and agricultural pollution. The lake often has excessive nitrate levels from agricultural runoff. Many times the city was forced to warn people not to allow babies to consume water in Decatur because of "blue baby syndrome", Methemoglobinemia. Decatur has now installed nitrate treatment to avoid this problem.

The upper Sangamon, between Mahomet and Monticello, runs along the face of a terminal moraine within the Lake Michigan Glacial Lobe, which ranges in age from 28,000 to 12,000 BP. During the glacial Woodfordian Substage (middle Wisconsin Stage), ice of the Lake Michigan Glacial Lobe advanced rapidly, leaving a terminal moraine parallel to the modern Sangamon River. The ice stagnated and melted behind this moraine, without the meltwater overtopping the terminal moraine. Along this stretch, the eastern part of the watershed of the Sangamon therefore consists of short creeks, two to three miles (3–5 km) in length, that drain the face of the moraine. This forms an asymmetric watershed typical of rivers formed along the face of a terminal moraine.

== History ==
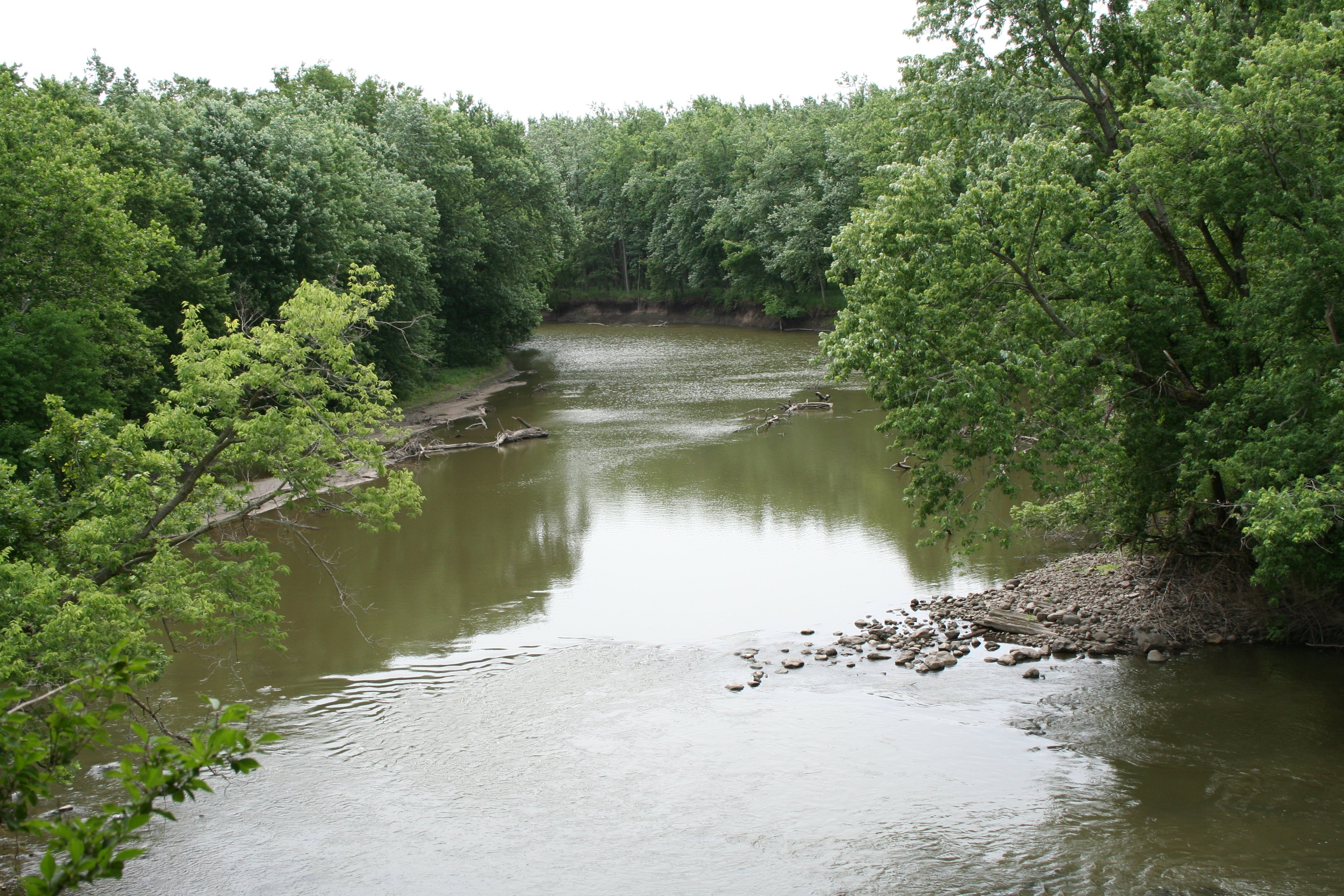
Sangamon River at Lincoln Trail Homestead State Memorial.

The river was home to many different groups of Native Americans in the centuries before the arrival of Europeans. While the name Sangamon is assumed to have originated from a Native American language, the exact language and any further etymology are both unknown, though various meanings, such as "good hunting grounds", "where there is plenty to eat", and "at the inlet" have been proposed. In the 18th century, groups of the Kickapoo settled along the river. In the middle 18th century, the region near the river was the scene of a conflict between the Illini and Meskwaki as part of the larger French and Iroquois Wars. French traders were active in the region throughout the middle 18th century when it was part of the Illinois Country.

The first U.S. settlers arrived in the region in the 1810s. In 1821, Elijah Iles built a log-framed store, the first commercial building in Springfield. Groups of Cumberland Presbyterians settled the river valley beginning in 1825, giving the region a distinctive culture identified and described at the turn of the 20th century by Edgar Lee Masters.

Abraham Lincoln arrived with his family in the area in 1830 to settle a section of government land bisected by the river. The site, now Lincoln Trail Homestead State Memorial, was selected by Lincoln's father after the family migrated from Indiana. The 21-year-old Lincoln helped build a 16 foot by 16 foot (4.8 m by 4.8 m) cabin along the river. The following year in 1831, he canoed down the river to homestead on his own near New Salem in Menard County northwest of Springfield. Later that year he floated down the river with companions on a flatboat to the Illinois River, and then following the Mississippi River to New Orleans.

Lincoln was impressed by the navigational difficulties on the river, especially during the arrival of the first steamship, the Talisman, a 150-ton steamer, up the river to Springfield in March 1832. Some sources state that Lincoln himself piloted the first steamship up the Sangamon to Springfield, accomplishing this feat with many men, almost as large as Lincoln, with axes to chop through whatever trees impeded the journey. More likely Lincoln acted as a guide and axeman. In later years, he told of taking a steamship three miles (5 km) into the prairie after losing his way on the Sangamon during a flood. During his first campaign for the Illinois General Assembly in 1832, he made navigational improvements on the river a centerpiece of his platform. From 1848 to 1860, Lincoln practiced law in the Illinois Eighth Judicial Circuit, which meant he regularly crossed the river as he traveled around the circuit.

The Potawatomi Trail of Death passed through here in 1838.

== The river today ==
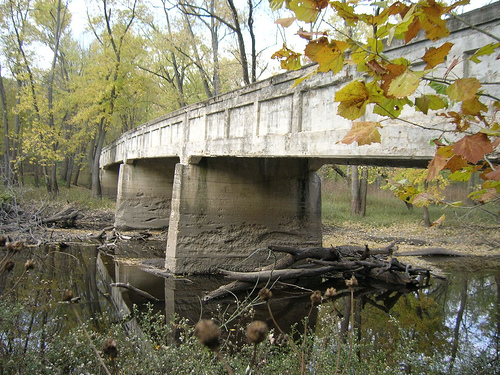
A concrete bridge over the Sangamon River in Robert Allerton Park, November 2007.

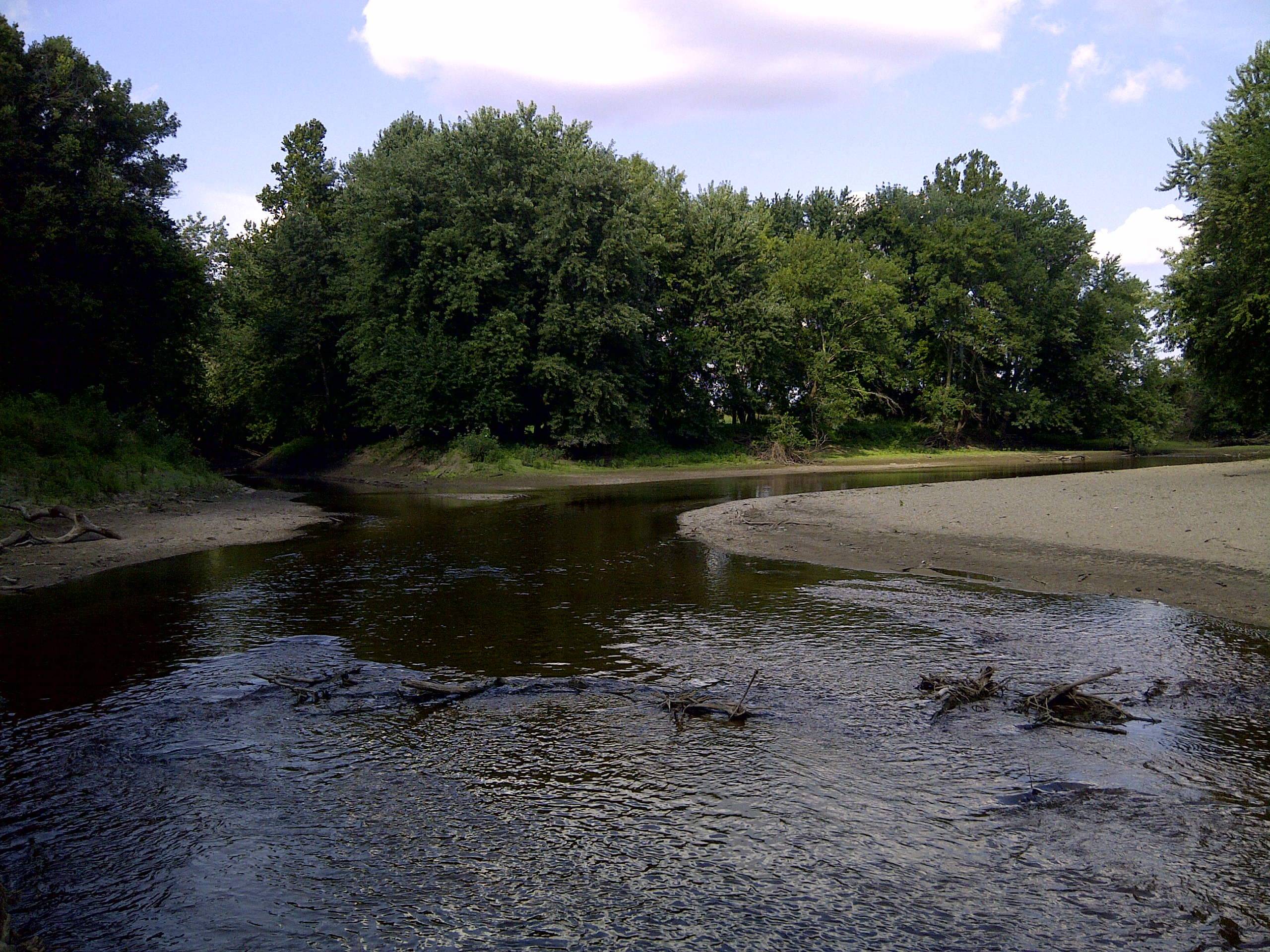
View looking N/NE of the Sangamon (flowing from the right along the curve) and one of its tributaries, Stevens Creek (left), in Macon County, IL.

Despite its environmental problems, the Sangamon River is a focus of recreation for the people of Central Illinois. Key parklands along the river, moving from upstream to downstream, include Shady Rest, Robert Allerton Park, the parks bordering Lake Decatur, Rock Springs Conservation Area, Lincoln Trail Homestead State Park, Springfield's Carpenter Park and Riverside Park, the Sangamon River State Fish and Wildlife Area, Lincoln's New Salem, Saybrook, and the Sanganois State Fish and Wildlife Area.

The river was mentioned in Sufjan Stevens's song "Decatur, Or, Round Of Applause For Your Stepmother!". Singer songwriter Ben Bedford references the Sangamon in several of his songs, one of which is titled after it.

== See also ==
- Rivers of America Series
