= Illinois's 11th House of Representatives district =

American legislative district

Illinois's 11th State House of Representatives district
Representative
| Ann Williams; D–Chicago |
since 2011
- Demographics: 74.3% White; 2.9% Black; 11.1% Hispanic; 6.7% Asian; 0.1% Native American; 0.0% Hawaiian/Pacific Islander; 0.42% Other; 4.5% Multiracial
- Population (2020): 119,492
- Created: 1983–present 1849–1873, 1957–1973

Illinois's 11th House of Representatives district is a Representative district within the Illinois House of Representatives located in Cook County, Illinois. It has been represented by Democrat Ann Williams since January 12, 2011. The district was previously represented by Democrat Kathleen C. Moore for a few weeks.

The district includes parts of the Chicago neighborhoods of Albany Park, Lake View, Lincoln Park, Lincoln Square, North Center, and Uptown.

== Representative district history ==
Prior to the ratification of the 1848 Illinois Constitution, counties (or two or more counties) were designated a certain number of Senators and Representatives. With the ratification of the 1848 Illinois Constitution, Legislative and Representative districts were numbered and called by name. Each district was still assigned a certain number of Senators and Representatives. After the passage of the 1872 Apportionment, only Legislative districts were drawn with Representatives elected cumulatively. The 1954 amendment to the 1870 Illinois Constitution established Representative districts as separate from Legislative districts (with representatives still elected cumulatively). The boundaries of Representative and Legislative districts would differ. After the United States Supreme Court ruled in Reynolds v. Sims (1964) that "both houses of state legislatures must be apportioned according to districts of equal population," new districts were redrawn for the Illinois Senate and Illinois House of Representatives. While the Legislative districts were redrawn, the Governor and General Assembly failed to agree on Representative district boundaries. Under the 1954 amendment, "a 10-man bipartisan commission appointed by the governor from recommendations made by both parties" were directed to redraw boundaries but failed to do so in 1963. Because of this failure, and with no district boundaries redrawn, all Representative districts were temporarily merged into one at-large district with 177 representatives (the total number of representatives at the time). The 1964 Illinois House election had several candidates running for all 177 seats throughout the state. In 1965, the Representative districts were redrawn by the Illinois Legislative Reapportionment Commission and elections held in 1966 were done with separate districts. With the 1971 Apportionment (and adoption of the 1970 Illinois Constitution), Representative districts were abolished and representatives were once again elected cumulatively per Legislative district. After the passage of the Cutback Amendment in 1980, the number of Representatives was reduced from 177 to 118 with Representative districts re-established and now electing a single representative.

== Prominent representatives ==
| Representative | Notes |
|---|---|
| Usher F. Linder | Served as the 10th Illinois Attorney General (1837 – 1838) |
| William Ralls Morrison | Served as a colonel for the 49th Illinois Infantry Regiment during the American Civil War (1861 – 1863); Elected to the U.S. House of Representatives from Illinois's 12th congressional district (1863 – 1865); Elected back to the U.S. House of Representatives from Illinois's 17th congressional district (1873 – 1883); Elected back to the U.S. House of Representatives from Illinois's 18th congressional district (1883 – 1887) |
| George Dunne | Elected President of the Cook County Board of Commissioners (1969 – 1990) |
| Arthur A. Telcser | Briefly served as the 66th Illinois Speaker of the House (1983) |

== List of representatives ==
=== 1849 – 1873 ===
| Representative | Party | Years (Note: From 1870 to 1970, the GA met for a new session on the Wednesday after the first Monday of January.) | General Assembly (GA) | Electoral history | Counties represented |
|---|---|---|---|---|---|
11th Representative district established with 1848 Illinois Constitution.
| Usher F. Linder | Whig | January 1, 1849 – January 3, 1853 | 16th 17th | Redistricted into the 11th Representative district and re-elected in 1848; Re-elected in 1850; Was not re-elected in 1852. | Coles |
| William D. Watson | Whig | January 3, 1853 – January 1, 1855 | 18th | Elected in 1852; Was not re-elected in 1854. | Coles |
| William Ralls Morrison | N B Dem | January 1, 1855 – January 7, 1861 | 19th 20th 21st | Elected in 1854; Re-elected in 1856; Re-elected in 1858; Was not re-elected in 1860. | Monroe |
| William Ralls Morrison | Democratic | January 1, 1855 – January 7, 1861 | 19th 20th 21st | Elected in 1854; Re-elected in 1856; Re-elected in 1858; Was not re-elected in 1860. | Monroe |
| H. C. Talbott | Unknown | January 7, 1861 – January 5, 1863 | 22nd | Elected in 1860; Was not re-elected in 1862. | Crawford; Jasper |
| David W. Odell | Unknown | January 5, 1863 – January 2, 1865 | 23rd | Elected in 1862; Was not re-elected in 1864. | Crawford; Jasper |
| Thomas Cooper | Democratic | January 2, 1865 – January 7, 1867 | 24th | Elected in 1864; Was not re-elected in 1866. | Crawford; Jasper |
| David W. Odell | Unknown | January 7, 1867 – January 4, 1869 | 25th | Elected back in 1866; Was not re-elected in 1868. | Crawford; Jasper |
| Joseph Cooper | Democratic | January 4, 1869 – January 4, 1871 | 26th | Elected in 1868; Was not re-elected in 1870. | Crawford; Jasper |
| Calvin Allen | Democratic | January 4, 1871 – January 8, 1873 | 27th | Elected in 1870; Was not re-elected in 1872. | Hamilton |
District abolished with 1872 Reapportionment as 3 Representatives were now elected cumulatively from Legislative districts.

=== 1957 – 1973 ===
| Representative | Party | Party Control | Years (Note: Since 1970, the GA meets on the second Wednesday of January for a new session.) | General Assembly (GA) | Electoral history | Counties represented |
|---|---|---|---|---|---|---|
District re-established in 1957.
| Paul J. Randolph | Republican | 2 Democrats; 1 Republican | January 9, 1957 – January 6, 1965 | 70th 71st 72nd 73rd | Redistricted from the 29th Legislative district and re-elected in 1956; Re-elected in 1958; Re-elected in 1960; Re-elected in 1962; Ran in the At-large district election and won re-election in 1964. | Cook |
| Joseph De La Cour | Democratic | 2 Democrats; 1 Republican | January 9, 1957 – January 9, 1963 | 70th 71st 72nd | Redistricted from the 20th Legislative district and re-elected in 1956; Re-elected in 1958; Re-elected in 1960; Elected state Senator from the 25th Legislative district in 1962. | Cook |
| George Dunne | Democratic | 2 Democrats; 1 Republican | January 9, 1957 – January 9, 1963 | 70th 71st 72nd | Redistricted from the 20th Legislative district and re-elected in 1956; Re-elected in 1958; Re-elected in 1960; Appointed to the Cook County Board of Commissioners in 1962. | Cook |
| Edward W. Wolbank | Democratic | 1 Democrat; 1 Republican | January 9, 1963 – January 6, 1965 | 73rd | Elected in 1962; Ran in the At-large district election and won re-election in 1964. | Cook |
| 1 Vacancy | | 1 Democrat; 1 Republican | January 9, 1963 – January 6, 1965 | 73rd | Harry Bauler died of a heart attack on December 6, 1962, before being sworn in. | Cook |
The district was temporarily abolished from 1965 to 1967 due to the Redistricting Commission in 1963 failing to reach an agreement. An at-large election was held electing 177 Representatives from across the state.
| John Merlo | Democratic | 2 Democrats; 1 Republican | January 4, 1967 – January 10, 1973 | 75th 76th 77th | Re-districted from At-large district and re-elected in 1966; Re-elected in 1968; Re-elected in 1970; Redistricted to the 12th Legislative district and re-elected in 1972. | Cook |
| Arthur A. Telcser | Republican | 2 Democrats; 1 Republican | January 4, 1967 – January 10, 1973 | 75th 76th 77th | Elected in 1966; Re-elected in 1968; Re-elected in 1970; Redistricted to the 12th Legislative district and re-elected in 1972. | Cook |
| Frank Lyman | Democratic | 2 Democrats; 1 Republican | January 4, 1967 – January 13, 1971 | 75th 76th | Re-districted from At-large district and re-elected in 1966; Re-elected in 1968; Retired. | Cook |
| Bruce L. Douglas | Democratic | 2 Democrats; 1 Republican | January 13, 1971 – January 10, 1973 | 77th | Elected in 1970; Redistricted to the 12th Legislative district and re-elected in 1972. | Cook |
District abolished with 1971 Reapportionment as Representatives were once again elected from Legislative districts.

=== 1983 – Present ===
| Representative | Party | Years | General Assembly (GA) | Electoral history | Counties represented |
|---|---|---|---|---|---|
District re-established with representatives now elected one per district with the passage of the Cutback Amendment
| Steven G. Nash | Democratic | January 12, 1983 – January 14, 1987 | 83rd 84th | Elected in 1982; Re-elected in 1984; Retired. | Cook |
| Robert J. Bugielski | Democratic | January 14, 1987 – 1992/1993 | 85th 86th 87th | Elected in 1986; Re-elected in 1988; Re-elected in 1990; Redistricted to the 19th Representative district, re-elected in 1992, and resigned his 11th district seat during the 87th GA. | Cook |
| Vacant | | 1992/1993 – 1992/1993 | 87th | | Cook |
| Judy Erwin | Democratic | 1992/1993 – January 8, 2003 | 87th 88th 89th 90th 91st 92nd | Elected in 1992 and appointed during the 87th GA; Re-elected in 1994; Re-elected in 1996; Re-elected in 1998; Re-elected in 2000; Retired. | Cook |
| John Fritchey | Democratic | January 8, 2003 – 2010 | 93rd 94th 95th 96th | Elected in 2002; Re-elected in 2004; Re-elected in 2006; Re-elected in 2008; Elected to the Cook County Board of Commissioners and resigned his seat in 2010. | Cook |
| Vacant | | 2010 – December 29, 2010 | 96th | | Cook |
| Kathleen C. Moore | Democratic | December 29, 2010 – January 11, 2011 | 96th | Appointed to fill the remainder of Fritchey's term in 2010. | Cook |
| Vacant | | January 11, 2011 – January 12, 2011 | 96th | | Cook |
| Ann Williams | Democratic | January 12, 2011 – present | 97th 98th 99th 100th 101st 102nd 103rd | Elected in 2010; Re-elected in 2012; Re-elected in 2014; Re-elected in 2016; Re-elected in 2018; Re-elected in 2020; Re-elected in 2022 | Cook |

== Historic District Boundaries ==
| Years | County | Municipalities/Townships | Notes |
|---|---|---|---|
| 2023 – present | Cook | Chicago (Albany Park, Lake View, Lincoln Park, Lincoln Square, North Center, Uptown) | |
| 2013 – 2023 | Cook | Chicago (Albany Park, Avondale, Irving Park, Lake View, Lincoln Park, Lincoln Square, Logan Square, North Center) | |
| 2003 – 2013 | Cook | Chicago | |
| 1993 – 2003 | Cook | Chicago | |
| 1983 – 1993 | Cook | Chicago | |
| 1967 – 1973 | Cook | Chicago | |
| 1957 – 1965 | Cook | Chicago | |
| 1871 – 1873 | Hamilton | Belle Prairie (Belle Prairie City), Buck, Daldgren, Deleafield, Griswold, Halls, Jamestown, Jefferson City, Knights Prairie, Lanes Roads, Logansport, Lovilla, Macedonia, McLeansboro, Mellonsville, New London, Rectorville, Roche Blave, Shadsville, Shawneetown, Thackeray, Walpole | |
| 1863 – 1871 | Crawford; Jasper | Bellair, Brockville, Elkton, Grandville, Hebron, Hardinville, Hudsonville, New Liberty, Newton, Palestine, Port Jackson, Robinson, Rose Hill, Spencerville, Ste. Marie, Vernon, York | |
| 1855 – 1863 | Monroe | Burksville, Columbia, Eagle Cliff, Freedom, Glasgow City, Harrisonville, James Mill, Maysville, Monroe City, Morrison, Prairie du Long, Renault, Smith's Landing, Waterloo | |
| 1849 – 1855 | Coles | Bethesda, Bushy Fork, Campbell, Charleston, Hermitage, Hitesville, Oakland, Okaw, Paradise, Springville, Upper Embarrass, Wabash Point | |

== Electoral history ==
=== 2030 – 2022 ===
2022 Illinois House of Representatives election
| Party | Candidate | Votes | % | ±% |
|---|---|---|---|---|
| Democratic | Ann M. Williams (incumbent) | 36,894 | 85.48 | −14.52% |
| Republican | Marc James | 6265 | 14.52 | N/A |
| Total votes | | 43,159 | 100.0 | |

=== 2020 – 2012 ===
2020 Illinois House of Representatives election
| Party | Candidate | Votes | % |
|---|---|---|---|
| Democratic | Ann M. Williams (incumbent) | 50,970 | 100.0 |
| Total votes | | 50,970 | 100.0 |

2018 Illinois House of Representatives election
| Party | Candidate | Votes | % | ±% |
|---|---|---|---|---|
| Democratic | Ann M. Williams (incumbent) | 42,291 | 100.0 | +28.44% |
| Total votes | | 42,291 | 100.0 | |

2016 Illinois House of Representatives election
| Party | Candidate | Votes | % | ±% |
|---|---|---|---|---|
| Democratic | Ann M. Williams (incumbent) | 38,028 | 71.56 | −28.44% |
| Republican | Gary Mandell | 15,115 | 28.44 | N/A |
| Total votes | | 53,143 | 100.0 | |

2014 Illinois House of Representatives election
| Party | Candidate | Votes | % |
|---|---|---|---|
| Democratic | Ann M. Williams (incumbent) | 22,562 | 100.0 |
| Total votes | | 22,562 | 100.0 |

2012 Illinois House of Representatives election
| Party | Candidate | Votes | % | ±% |
|---|---|---|---|---|
| Democratic | Ann M. Williams (incumbent) | 35,783 | 100.0 | +28.86% |
| Total votes | | 35,783 | 100.0 | |

=== 2010 – 2002 ===
2010 Illinois House of Representatives election
| Party | Candidate | Votes | % | ±% |
|---|---|---|---|---|
| Democratic | Ann M. Williams | 21,813 | 71.14 | −28.86% |
| Republican | Scott Tucker | 8,851 | 28.86 | N/A |
| Total votes | | 30,664 | 100.0 | |

2008 Illinois House of Representatives election
| Party | Candidate | Votes | % | ±% |
|---|---|---|---|---|
| Democratic | John A. Fritchey (incumbent) | 38,824 | 100.0 | +16.95% |
| Total votes | | 38,824 | 100.0 | |

2006 Illinois House of Representatives election
| Party | Candidate | Votes | % | ±% |
|---|---|---|---|---|
| Democratic | John A. Fritchey (incumbent) | 22,170 | 83.05 | +10.75% |
| Republican | Arthur S. Odishoo | 4,525 | 16.95 | −6.76% |
| Total votes | | 26,695 | 100.0 | |

2004 Illinois House of Representatives election
| Party | Candidate | Votes | % | ±% |
|---|---|---|---|---|
| Democratic | John A. Fritchey (incumbent) | 32,073 | 72.30 | −14.88% |
| Republican | Doug Nelson | 10,518 | 23.71 | N/A |
| Libertarian | Jason J. Briggeman | 1,770 | 3.99 | −8.83% |
| Total votes | | 44,361 | 100.0 | |

2002 Illinois House of Representatives election
| Party | Candidate | Votes | % | ±% |
|---|---|---|---|---|
| Democratic | John A. Fritchey | 22,934 | 87.18 | +19.32% |
| Libertarian | John E. Yackley | 3,371 | 12.82 | N/A |
| Total votes | | 26,305 | 100.0 | |

=== 2000 – 1992 ===
2000 Illinois House of Representatives election
| Party | Candidate | Votes | % | ±% |
|---|---|---|---|---|
| Democratic | Judy Erwin (incumbent) | 31,765 | 67.86 | −5.44% |
| Republican | Shawn M. Hanley | 15,043 | 32.14 | +5.44% |
| Total votes | | 46,808 | 100.0 | |

1998 Illinois House of Representatives election
| Party | Candidate | Votes | % | ±% |
|---|---|---|---|---|
| Democratic | Judy Erwin (incumbent) | 22,415 | 73.30 | +2.45% |
| Republican | Jon Stewart | 8,164 | 26.70 | −2.45% |
| Total votes | | 30,579 | 100.0 | |

1996 Illinois House of Representatives election
| Party | Candidate | Votes | % | ±% |
|---|---|---|---|---|
| Democratic | Judy Erwin (incumbent) | 29,816 | 70.85 | +5.37% |
| Republican | Rudy Pamintuan | 12,267 | 29.15 | −5.37% |
| Total votes | | 42,083 | 100.0 | |

1994 Illinois House of Representatives election
| Party | Candidate | Votes | % | ±% |
|---|---|---|---|---|
| Democratic | Judy Erwin (incumbent) | 18,914 | 65.48 | +4.51% |
| Republican | Charles Stone | 9,971 | 34.52 | −4.51% |
| Total votes | | 28,885 | 100.0 | |

1992 Illinois House of Representatives election
| Party | Candidate | Votes | % | ±% |
|---|---|---|---|---|
| Democratic | Judy Erwin | 32,618 | 60.97 | −19.17% |
| Republican | Jeff Perlee | 20,883 | 39.03 | +19.17% |
| Total votes | | 53,501 | 100.0 | |

=== 1990 – 1982 ===
1990 Illinois House of Representatives election
| Party | Candidate | Votes | % | ±% |
|---|---|---|---|---|
| Democratic | Robert J. Bugielski (incumbent) | 14,702 | 80.14 | +5.30% |
| Republican | Frank R. Ranallo | 3,644 | 19.86 | −5.30% |
| Total votes | | 18,346 | 100.0 | |

1988 Illinois House of Representatives election
| Party | Candidate | Votes | % | ±% |
|---|---|---|---|---|
| Democratic | Robert J. Bugielski (incumbent) | 22,049 | 74.84 | −25.16% |
| Republican | Gary C. Hansen | 7,413 | 25.16 | N/A |
| Total votes | | 29,462 | 100.0 | |

1986 Illinois House of Representatives election
| Party | Candidate | Votes | % | ±% |
|---|---|---|---|---|
| Democratic | Robert (Bob) Bugielski | 16,969 | 100.0 | +36.60% |
| Total votes | | 16,969 | 100.0 | |

1984 Illinois House of Representatives election
| Party | Candidate | Votes | % | ±% |
|---|---|---|---|---|
| Democratic | Steven G. Nash (incumbent) | 19,607 | 63.40 | −36.60% |
| Republican | Frank R. Ranallo | 11,320 | 36.60 | N/A |
| Total votes | | 30,927 | 100.0 | |

1982 Illinois House of Representatives election
| Party | Candidate | Votes | % |
|---|---|---|---|
| Democratic | Steven G. Nash | 24,433 | 100.0 |
| Total votes | | 24,433 | 100.0 |

=== 1970 – 1962 ===
1970 Illinois House of Representatives election
| Party | Candidate | Votes | % |
|---|---|---|---|
| Democratic | Bruce L. Douglas | 47,793.5 | 35.86 |
| Democratic | John Merlo (incumbent) | 45,250 | 33.95 |
| Republican | Arthur A. Telcser (incumbent) | 40,250.5 | 30.20 |
| Write-in | | 2 | 0.00 |
| Total votes | | 133,296 | 100.0 |

1968 Illinois House of Representatives election
| Party | Candidate | Votes | % |
|---|---|---|---|
| Republican | Arthur A. Telcser (incumbent) | 65,945.5 | 40.04 |
| Democratic | Frank Lyman (incumbent) | 49,520.5 | 30.07 |
| Democratic | John Merlo (incumbent) | 49,220.5 | 29.89 |
| Total votes | | 164,686.5 | 100.0 |

1966 Illinois House of Representatives election
| Party | Candidate | Votes | % |
|---|---|---|---|
| Democratic | John Merlo | 39,664 | 26.53 |
| Republican | Arthur A. Telcser | 38,623 | 25.84 |
| Democratic | Frank Lyman | 36,310.5 | 24.29 |
| Republican | S. S. Schiller | 34,894 | 23.34 |
| Total votes | | 149,491.5 | 100.0 |

1962 Illinois House of Representatives election
| Party | Candidate | Votes | % |
|---|---|---|---|
| Republican | Paul J. Randolph (incumbent) | 44,235.5 | 38.95 |
| Democratic | Harry P. Bauler | 35,451.5 | 31.21 |
| Democratic | Edward P. Wolbank | 33,891 | 29.84 |
| Write-in | | 3 | 0.00 |
| Total votes | | 113,581 | 100.0 |

=== 1960 – 1956 ===
1960 Illinois House of Representatives election
| Party | Candidate | Votes | % |
|---|---|---|---|
| Republican | Paul J. Randolph (incumbent) | 56,014.5 | 38.99 |
| Democratic | Joseph L. De La Cour (incumbent) | 44,545 | 31.01 |
| Democratic | George W. Dunne (incumbent) | 43,103.5 | 30.00 |
| Total votes | | 143,663 | 100.0 |

1958 Illinois House of Representatives election
| Party | Candidate | Votes | % |
|---|---|---|---|
| Democratic | George W. Dunne (incumbent) | 41,379 | 35.25 |
| Democratic | Joseph L. De La Cour (incumbent) | 40,668.5 | 34.65 |
| Republican | Paul J. Randolph (incumbent) | 35,325 | 30.10 |
| Total votes | | 117,372.5 | 100.0 |

1956 Illinois House of Representatives election
| Party | Candidate | Votes | % |
|---|---|---|---|
| Republican | Paul J. Randolph | 70,990.5 | 46.08 |
| Democratic | Joseph L. De La Cour | 41,828 | 27.15 |
| Democratic | George W. Dunne | 41,236.5 | 26.77 |
| Total votes | | 154,055 | 100.0 |
