= St. Joe, Illinois =

- Unincorporated community
- Location within Illinois Location within the United States
- Coordinates: 38°13′58″N 90°09′13″W
- Country: United States
- State: Illinois
- County: Monroe
- Precinct: 23
- Elevation: 705 ft (215 m)
- Time zone: UTC-6 (CST)
  - Summer (DST): UTC-5 (CDT)
- Postal code: 62298
- Area code: 618

St. Joe, Illinois is a small unincorporated community in the historic New Design Precinct of Monroe County, Illinois, United States. It is located along the historic road from Kaskaskia to St. Louis, between Renault and Burksville.
