= Chaflin Bridge, Illinois =

- Unincorporated community
- Etymology: Isaac Chaflin, early settler
- Location within Illinois Location within the United States
- Coordinates: 38°12′43″N 90°16′07″W
- Country: United States
- State: Illinois
- County: Monroe
- Precinct: 15
- Elevation: 400 ft (120 m)
- Time zone: UTC-6 (CST)
  - Summer (DST): UTC-5 (CDT)
- Postal code: 62244
- Area code: 618

Chaflin Bridge is an unincorporated community in the historic Mitchie Precinct of Monroe County, Illinois, United States. It lies on the old Bluff Road in the American Bottoms between Fults and the old site of Valmeyer and near Maeystown.

== History ==
It was settled in 1796 by Isaac Chaflin and his son William, who arrived in the area from England, via Pennsylvania. Another son, James, was massacred along with his entire family when they were forced to stop for provisions while on their way to the area, travelling up the Mississippi from its confluence with the Ohio at Cairo, which was the main route for those moving west from the Appalachians.
