= Valmeyer Community Unit School District 3 =

School district in Monroe County, Illinois, United States

Address
- 300 South Cedar Bluff Drive Valmeyer, Illinois, 62295; United States

District information
- Type: Public
- Grades: PreK–12
- NCES District ID: 1740080

Students and staff
- Students: 378 (2020–2021)

Other information
- Website: www.valmeyerk12.org

Valmeyer Community Unit School District 3 is a unified school district centered on the Monroe County Mississippi River village of Valmeyer, Illinois, although it also encompasses residents of the villages of Fults and Maeystown. This south Illinois school district is composed of three schools: Valmeyer Elementary School, which accommodates the grades PK-5; Valmeyer Junior High School, which accommodates grades 6–8; and, lastly, Valmeyer High School, which covers grades 9–12. The mascot of the school is the pirate.

Valmeyer Community Unit School District 3 hosts a variety of afterschool activities, including National Honor Society, Model United Nations, Art Club, Spanish Club, FFA, FEA, Pep Club, pep band, a chorus and concert band.
