= Wartburg, Illinois =

- Unincorporated community
- Etymology: Wartburg Castle, Germany
- Location within Illinois Location within the United States
- Coordinates: 38°17′26″N 90°11′44″W
- Country: United States
- State: Illinois
- County: Monroe
- Precinct: 12
- Elevation: 659 ft (201 m)
- Time zone: UTC-6 (CST)
  - Summer (DST): UTC-5 (CDT)
- Postal code: 62298
- Area code: 618

Wartburg is a small unincorporated community in the historic New Design Precinct of Monroe County, Illinois, United States. Wartburg lies along the road from Waterloo to Mayestown, and Camp Wartburg, a Lutheran youth retreat, is nearby.

== History ==
Wartburg grew up around the Evangelical Lutheran Church of the Holy Cross, organized in 1841, the small stone church being completed in 1844. Wartburg was originally to have been called Beaver Pond, however the area's residents, who were almost uniformly Lutherans, preferred to name their nascent community after a castle in Germany where Martin Luther resided for some time and translated the Holy Bible into German. The name and Post Office were established in 1881.
