= New Hanover =

New Hanover may refer to:

== Places ==
- New Hanover, Illinois
- New Hanover, KwaZulu-Natal, South Africa
- New Hanover County, North Carolina, United States
- New Hanover Island, a volcanic island in the Bismarck Archipelago of Papua New Guinea
- New Hanover Township, New Jersey, United States
- New Hanover Township, Pennsylvania, United States

== Other uses ==
- New Hanover High School, Wilmington, North Carolina, United States
- USS New Hanover (AKA-73), a U.S. Navy Tolland-class attack cargo ship
- New Hanover, a fictional Western US state in the 2018 video game Red Dead Redemption 2
