= Kaskaskia River State Fish and Wildlife Area =

State park in Illinois, USA

- IUCN category IV (habitat/species management area)
- Location within Illinois Location within the United States
- Location: St. Clair, Monroe, and Randolph Counties, Illinois, USA
- Nearest city: Baldwin, Illinois
- Coordinates: 38°17′08″N 89°54′32″W
- Area: 20,000 acres (8,094 ha)
- Governing body: Illinois Department of Natural Resources

Kaskaskia River State Fish and Wildlife Area is an Illinois state park on 20,000 acres (8,094 ha) in St. Clair, Monroe, and Randolph Counties, Illinois, United States. A focus of this conservation area is Baldwin Lake, a perched cooling pond managed by the Illinois Department of Natural Resources for fishing.
