= Illinois Caverns State Natural Area =

State park in Illinois, USA

- IUCN category V (protected landscape/seascape)
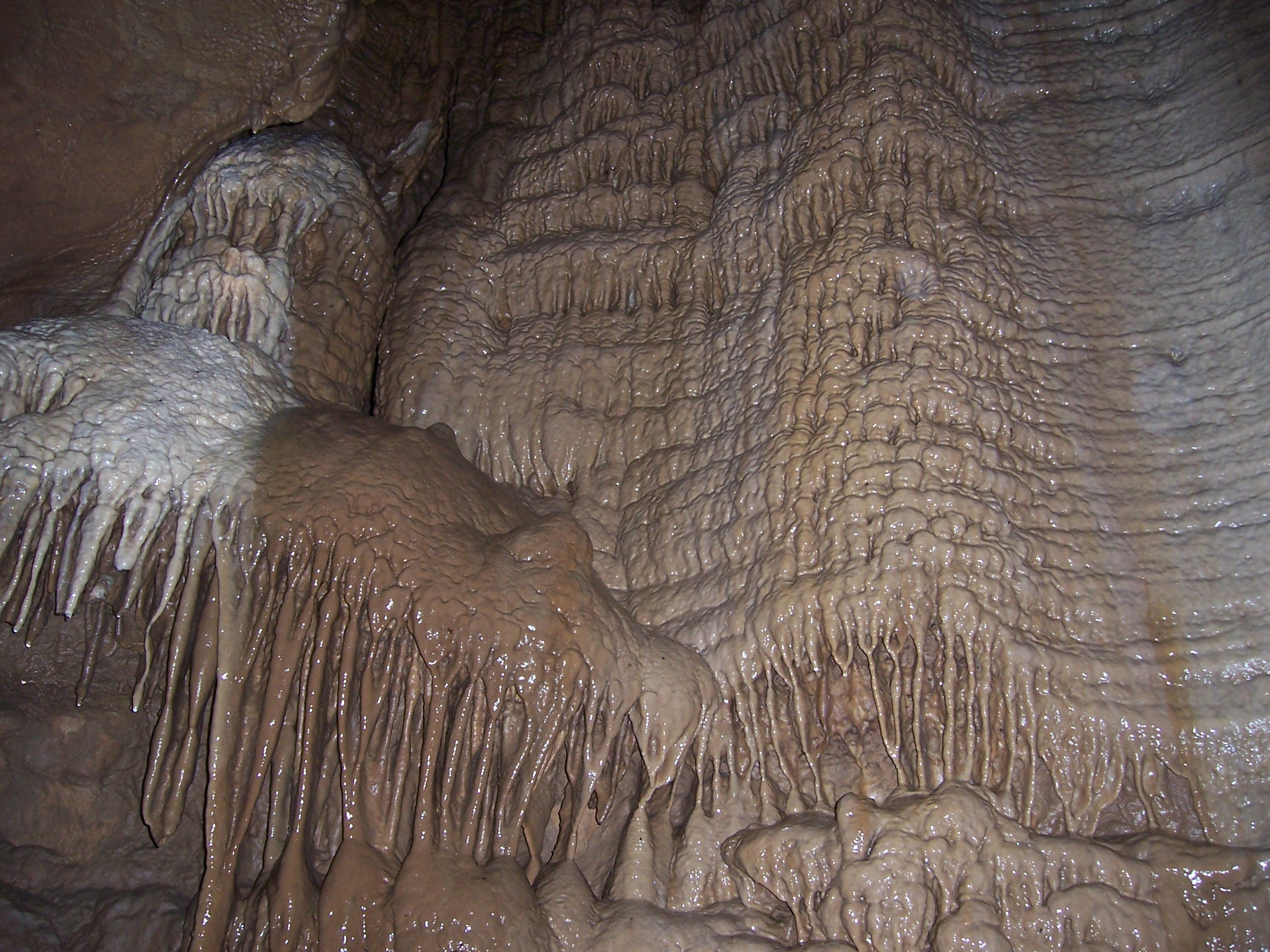
- Drapery and flowstone in Chimney Dome

- Location within Illinois Location within the United States
- Location: Monroe County, Illinois, U.S.
- Nearest city: Waterloo, Illinois
- Coordinates: 38°14′08″N 90°08′13″W
- Area: 120 acres (49 ha)
- Established: April 23, 1901
- Governing body: Illinois Department of Natural Resources

Illinois Caverns is a state natural area in the New Design Precinct of Monroe County, Illinois. It features Illinois Caverns which is alternatively known as Mammoth Cave of Illinois (also Burksville Cave, Egyptian Cave, Eckert Cave). Illinois Caverns is the second-largest cave in Illinois and has more than 9.6 km of passages. The cave has a constant temperature of 58 °F (14 °C), and portions flood during wet weather. Passages can be 20 feet (6.1 m) high and just as wide. It is located off Illinois Route 3, south of Waterloo, near the unincorporated community of Burksville.

== History ==
What is now known as Illinois Caverns hosted its first paying customers in March 1901, operated by a Mr. White of East Saint Louis. It is the only cave in Illinois to have been commercially operated, attracting many visitors from St. Louis during the 1904 World's Fair. However the cave was never considered a commercial success (it closed in 1907), and had remained almost completely unimproved, excepting the extant concrete entrance stairs and a single ladder. When the cave and environs were sold to the State of Illinois in 1985, care of the site was entrusted to Armin Krueger, until his death.

== Geology ==
The cave was, and in fact still is being formed in the Mississippian limestone (CaCO_{3}) and dolomite (CaMg(CO_{3})_{2}) (or karst common to the region) by water dissolution, and includes cave formations such as stalactites, stalagmites, rimstone dams, flowstone, and soda straws. The cavern is a branchwork type cave, which generally consists of a central cavern and stream with smaller passages and tributaries branching off. Numerous circular, crater-like depressions are evident in the area surrounding the entrance, easily visible from the air or space. These are typical of both the area and karst topography in general.

== Cave fauna ==
Fauna in the cave includes bats, salamanders, frogs, crickets, amphipods, and isopods. Illinois Caverns is home to the federal endangered species Gammarus acherondytes (a.k.a. Illinois Cave Amphipod). This species of amphipod is found nowhere else in the world except a few neighboring caves located in the southwestern Illinois karst.

== Visitation ==
The cave was closed to visitors in early 2010 to stop the spread of white-nose syndrome (WNS) in bats. The cave reopened to visitors on June 16, 2021.

Persons desiring to enter the cave need a permit. A minimum of four people per party is needed for entrance into the cave. Each person needs to have a hardhat, boots, sturdy clothing, and three sources of light. At times some portions of the cave may be off-limits, these areas should be clearly marked.
