= Burksville Station, Illinois =

- Unincorporated community
- Etymology: Railroad station for Burksville
- Location within Illinois Location within the United States
- Coordinates: 38°16′05″N 90°07′06″W
- Country: United States
- State: Illinois
- County: Monroe
- Precinct: 8
- Elevation: 666 ft (203 m)
- Time zone: UTC-6 (CST)
  - Summer (DST): UTC-5 (CDT)
- Postal code: 62298
- Area code: 618

Burksville Station is an unincorporated community in the New Design Precinct of Monroe County, Illinois, United States. It grew up around a station on the St. Louis and Cairo Railroad.
