= Gammarus acherondytes =

Conservation status
- Endangered (IUCN 3.1)

Scientific classification
- Kingdom: Animalia
- Phylum: Arthropoda
- Class: Malacostraca
- Order: Amphipoda
- Family: Gammaridae
- Genus: Gammarus
- Species: G. acherondytes

Binomial name
- Gammarus acherondytes Hubricht & Mackin, 1940

Synonyms
- Gammarus acheronytes (orthographic error)

Species of crustacean

Gammarus acherondytes, the Illinois cave amphipod, is a species of crustacean in the family Gammaridae. The crustacean is endemic to the Illinois Sinkhole Plain of Monroe County and St. Clair County, in southwestern Illinois, including Illinois Caverns State Natural Area.

Historically Gammarus acherondytes was known from six caves, but in a survey in 1995 the species was found at only three of the sites, with one further site inaccessible. This species occurs only in underground streams. It was first collected in 1938 and described as a new species in 1940. It has only been found in six cave streams, all lie within a 10-mile radius circle around Waterloo, Illinois, making this a very localized species. However, there is no evidence that these cave streams are currently interconnected. The main threat to the species is groundwater contamination.

== Description ==
Gammarus acherondytes is a rather small crustacean with its most notable features being the light gray-blue color of its exoskeleton, and rather small eyes and no sensory organs on its second antenna.

== Range and habitat ==
Gammarus acherondytes is native to underground streams and waterways in Illinois. It has been recorded from five cave streams located in the Monroe and St.Clair counties. Fogelpole Cave, Illinois Caverns, Krueger-Dry Run Cave, Madonnaville Cave, and Pautler Cave in Monroe County. Along with Stemler Cave in St. Clair County. With Pautler Cave being closed down by the landowner. The largest population is recorded in the Illinois Caverns while no specimens were collected in Madonnaville and Stemler Cave since 1986 and 1965 respectively. Genetic evidence implies that none of these cave systems are interconnected due to the genomic pool of the populations being quite varied.

== Threats and conservation efforts ==
Human pollution and runoff is the main threat to the species. With chemical pollution being the major threat to quality of water where they reside. Although research shows that Gammarus acherondytes breed all year-round. With juveniles constituting more than 50% of the population and strongly influence population density. Giving reason to believe that if they are allowed to remain undisturbed the population could feasibly bounce back to pre-pollutant levels.
