= Bernie Hansen =

American politician (1944–2021)

City of Chicago Alderman
- In office 1983–2002
- Preceded by: John Merlo
- Succeeded by: Thomas M. Tunney
- Constituency: 44th ward

Personal details
- Born: November 26, 1944 Chicago, Illinois
- Died: July 18, 2021 (aged 76)
- Party: Democratic

Bernie Hansen (November 26, 1944 – July 18, 2021) was a longtime Chicago alderman, serving on the Chicago City Council from 1983 to 2002, when he retired as alderman of the 44th Ward citing health reasons. He was a Democrat.

Hansen was elected to the Chicago City Council in 1983 when the incumbent alderman, John Merlo, retired. In 1987 he defeated Dr. Ron Sable, a liberal gay activist, by a 52% to 47% margin in the race for 44th Ward alderman. It was a hard-fought campaign in the city's 44th Ward, which at the time was the heart of the city's gay community. Sable ran against Hansen again in 1991, but Hansen prevailed again, 65% to 35%.

From 1994 to 2000, he served as one of four U.S. commissioners to the Great Lakes Fishery Commission, a presidential appointment to a bilateral treaty organization with Canada responsible for fisheries management research and recommendations and for sea lamprey control for the Great Lakes fisheries. For part of that time, he chaired the commission.

During Council Wars Hansen was generally aligned with the "Vrdolyak 29," the block of mostly white aldermen who opposed Mayor Harold Washington. He sponsored or co-sponsored several human rights ordinances, including the Human Rights Ordinance expanding protection against discrimination in housing, employment, public accommodations, and credit to gay males, lesbians, and persons with disabilities, an ordinance to assist victims of hate crimes, and a 1997 ordinance Hansen introduced to extend health-care benefits to the domestic partners of gay and lesbian city employees. Thomas M. Tunney, his successor as 44th Ward alderman whom Hansen had "hand-picked", became Chicago's first openly gay alderman.

Hansen was also an active proponent of environmentalist measures, including recycling programs and the extension of Chicago's moratorium against the creation of new landfills.

Some residents of the Lakeview community voiced concern that Hansen was more concerned with building expensive condos and co-ops, then re-building the neighborhood with affordable housing during his tenure. He served on the board of many community councils as well as fund raising organizations, including the John Merlo Sports Program.

After his retirement from the city council, he continued to serve as Democratic committeeman from the 44th Ward, ultimately handing over the title to Alderman Tom Tunney. John Merlo held the position from 1969 to 1992.

Hansen made an attempt to be a Democratic Congressional Candidate for Illinois's 5th congressional district in 2002, but when the Democratic National Committee backed Clinton Administration staffer Rahm Emanuel in the race, Hansen withdrew and soon after resigned from the 44th Ward Aldermanic seat.

He was married to Annette and had two sons, Paul and David. He had two grandchildren. He attended the University of Chicago and had residences in both Chicago and Arizona. He was a longtime Chicago Cubs fan and avid golfer.
