= Ann Williams (politician) =

American politician from Illinois (born 1968)

Member of the Illinois House of Representatives from the 11th district
- Incumbent
- Assumed office January 12, 2011
- Preceded by: Kathleen C. Moore

Personal details
- Born: 1968 (age 57–58)
- Party: Democratic
- Education: University of Iowa (BA); Drake University (JD)

Ann M. Williams (born 1968) is a Democratic member of the Illinois House of Representatives who has represented the 11th district since 2011. The district includes the Chicago neighborhoods of West Lakeview, Roscoe Village, and North Center, as well as parts of Lincoln Park and Lincoln Square.

== Education and career ==
Williams received a Bachelor of Arts in Journalism from the University of Iowa in 1992 and a Juris Doctor from Drake University in 1994. As an attorney, she served as Assistant Attorney General in the office of Illinois Attorney General Lisa Madigan.

== State representative ==
Williams was elected to her first term as state representative of Illinois' 11th District in 2010 to replace John Fritchey who chose to run for a seat on the Cook County Board of Commissioners. Williams was supported by both of Chicago's major newspapers. The Chicago Tribune noted in its endorsement that "It's good to see that she believes party leaders shouldn't be exempt from the new campaign contribution caps imposed on everyone else." The Chicago Sun-Times called her "bright and conscientious" and noted her work for Attorney General Lisa Madigan and as a staff attorney for the state House. Williams focused her campaign on protecting women and children from sex offenders, fighting for greater access to affordable healthcare, and making government open and accountable to the people. Her Committee assignments include Judiciary I - Civil Law; Consumer Protection; Adoption Reform; Business Occupational Licenses; Environmental Health; and Government Operations Subcommittee.

Williams won reelection to a second term in 2012. She ran unopposed in the March 20 Democratic primary and was unopposed in the general election, which took place on November 6, 2012. Williams was re-elected to a third term in November 2014.

In 2018, J. B. Pritzker appointed Williams to Powering Illinois’ Future transition committee, which is responsible for infrastructure and clean energy policies.

Williams is pro-choice and favors the legalization of same-sex marriage. She was a co-sponsor of the bill legalizing same-sex marriage in Illinois. Williams was the only Chicago lawmaker in the Illinois House to vote against a bill supported by Chicago Mayor Rahm Emanuel allowing speed-detection cameras near schools and parks throughout the city.

As of July 3, 2022, Representative Williams is a member of the following Illinois House committees:

- Civil Procedure & Tort Liability Subcommittee (HJUA-CIVI)
- Commercial Property Subcommittee (HJUA-COMM)
- (chairwoman of) Energy & Environment Committee (HENG)
- Ethics & Elections Committee (SHEE)
- Judiciary - Civil Committee (HJUA)
- Lobbying Subcommittee (SHEE-LOBY)
- Small Business, Tech Innovation, and Entrepreneurship Committee (SBTE)
- Tourism Committee (SHTO)

== Electoral history ==
Illinois 11th Representative District Democratic Primary, 2010
Party	Candidate	Votes	%
Democratic	Ann M. Williams	5,662	46.23
Democratic	Dan Farley	3,927	32.06
Democratic	Ed Mullen	2,659	21.71
Total votes		14,101	100.0

Illinois 11th Representative District General Election, 2010
Party	Candidate	Votes	%
Democratic	Ann M. Williams	21,813	71.14
Republican	Scott Tucker	8,851	28.86
Total votes		30,664	100.0

Illinois 11th Representative District General Election, 2012
Party	Candidate	Votes	%	±%
Democratic	Ann M. Williams (incumbent)	35,783	100.0	+28.86%
Total votes		35,783	100.0	

Illinois 11th Representative District General Election, 2014
Party	Candidate	Votes	%
Democratic	Ann M. Williams (incumbent)	22,562	100.0
Total votes		22,562	100.0

Illinois 11th Representative District General Election, 2016
Party	Candidate	Votes	%	±%
Democratic	Ann M. Williams (incumbent)	38,028	71.56	−28.44%
Republican	Gary Mandell	15115	28.44	N/A
Total votes		53,143	100.0	

Illinois 11th Representative District General Election, 2018
Party	Candidate	Votes	%	±%
Democratic	Ann M. Williams (incumbent)	42,291	100.0	+28.44%
Total votes		42,291	100.0	

Illinois 11th Representative District General Election, 2020
Party	Candidate	Votes	%
Democratic	Ann M. Williams (incumbent)	50,970	100.0
Total votes		50,970	100.0

Illinois 11th Representative District General Election, 2022
Party	Candidate	Votes	%	±%
Democratic	Ann M. Williams (incumbent)	36,894	85.48	−14.52%
Republican	Marc James	6265	14.52	N/A
Total votes		43,159	100.0	
