= Tipton, Monroe County, Illinois =

Tipton, Illinois
- Unincorporated community
- Etymology: County Tipperary, Ireland
- Location within Illinois Location within the United States
- Coordinates: 38°14′09″N 90°06′04″W
- Country: United States
- State: Illinois
- County: Monroe
- Precinct: 8
- Elevation: 607 ft (185 m)
- Time zone: UTC-6 (CST)
  - Summer (DST): UTC-5 (CDT)
- Postal code: 62298
- Area code: 618

Tipton is a small unincorporated community in Monroe County, Illinois, United States. It grew up around the Cambria Station on the St. Louis and Cairo Railroad. The community there, settled by persons of Irish descent, was called Tipperary, which degenerated over time through Tiptown, to the current Tipton.
