= Renault, Illinois =

- Unincorporated community
- Etymology: Philip Francois Renault
- Location within Illinois Location within the United States
- Coordinates: 38°09′13″N 90°08′02″W
- Country: United States
- State: Illinois
- County: Monroe
- Precinct: 9
- Elevation: 682 ft (208 m)
- Time zone: UTC-6 (CST)
  - Summer (DST): UTC-5 (CDT)
- Postal code: 62279
- Area code: 618

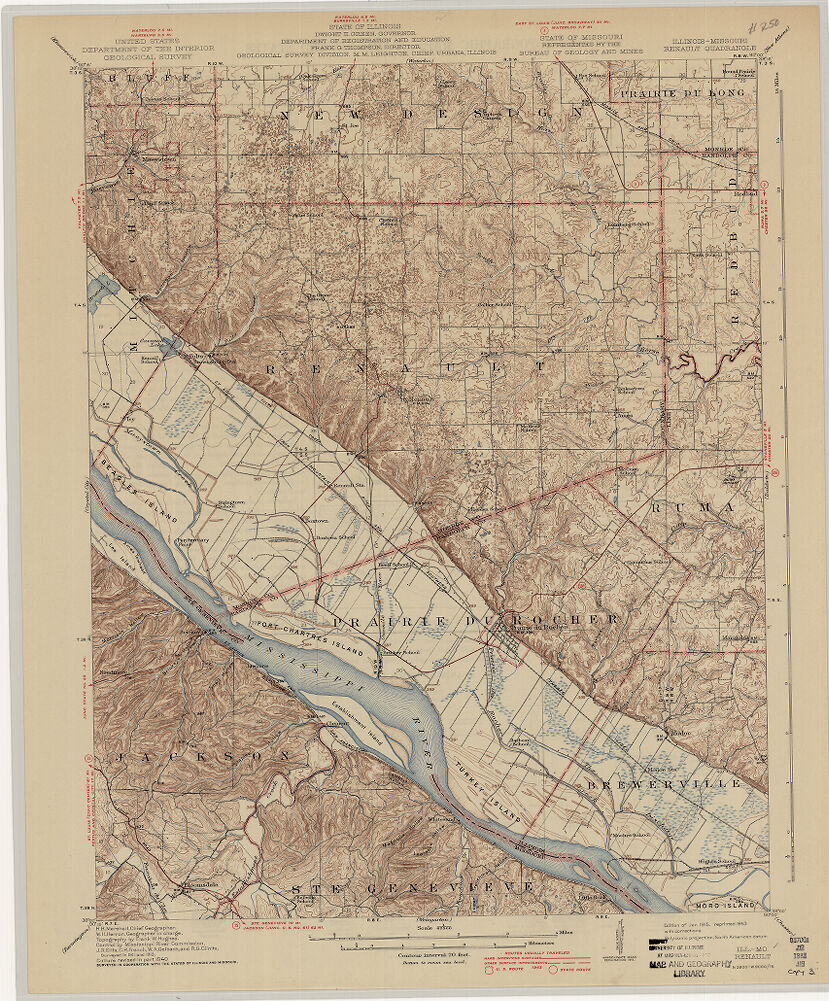
Left

Renault (pronounced REE-nalt or re-NALT) is a small unincorporated community in the historic Renault Precinct of Monroe County, Illinois, United States.

== History ==
=== Philip Francois Renault ===
Renault and its surrounding precinct within Monroe County, bear the name of one of the most conspicuous men connected with the early French settlements of Illinois. Philip Francois Renault, left his native Picardy, France in 1719 for the New World. Along the way, he picked up 500 African slaves in Santo Domingo, for use in the mines he expected to develop; these were the first slaves of their kind brought to Illinois. In 1723 Renault was granted “in freehold, in order to make his establishment upon the mines” of a tract of land a league and a half in a width by six in depth on the “Little Marameig” in Upper Louisiana (Missouri); another tract of two leagues “at the mine called the mine of Lamothe;” another of one league in front of Pimeteau on the river Illinois; and “one league fronting on the Mississippi, at the place called the Great Marsh, adjoining on one side to the Illinois Indians, settled near Fort de Chartres, with a depth of two leagues, this place being the situation which has been granted to him for the raising of provisions, and to enable him to furnish then to all the settlements he shall make upon the mines.” The latter grant being within the current precinct, and intended as the "breadbasket" of Renault's operations. He founded a small community, St. Phillipe, to facilitate his agricultural enterprises, however his community was largely abandoned in 1765, most of its citizens removing across the Mississippi River to what was still French-controlled territory at the time. The captain of the local militia remained as the sole French household, by 1700, there were no French left there, and the site had a single inhabitant in 1801. Very few traces of the site remain.

=== Glasgow City ===
What is now called Renault was originally called Glasgow City and was laid out by Jame Glasgow in the year 1860, along the old St. Louis and Kaskaskia Road, which passed through Burksville and Waterloo on its way to St. Louis. In 1883, it contained 28 homes and a population of about 150. Sometime later, the settlement formally adopted the name which the local Post Office used. In the late 19th century, persons claiming to represent the estate of Renault reportedly attempted to recover these lands from later inhabitants.

== Notable person ==
- Lee Dashner, MLB pitcher for the Cleveland Naps
