= St. Philippe, Illinois =

Extinct hamlet in Illinois, U.S.

Coordinates: 38°06′19″N 90°10′49″W

St. Philippe is a former village in Monroe County, Illinois, United States. The settlement was founded in ca. 1723 by Frenchman Philip Francois Renault, during the French colonial period. St. Philippe was strategically located near the bluffs that flank the east side of the Mississippi River in the vast Illinois floodplain known as the "American Bottom". The village was located three miles north of Fort de Chartres. Because of many decades of severe seasonal flooding, St. Philippe and the fort were both abandoned before 1765. After the British takeover of this area following their victory in the Seven Years' War, many French from the Illinois country moved west to Ste. Genevieve, Saint Louis, and Missouri.

== History ==
=== New France ===
In 1719, Philip Francois Renault arrived from Picardy to the area. A friend of the French King Louis XV, Renaud was given a large tract of land for mining purposes. However, he was not as successful as anticipated. He founded the village of St. Philippe along the Mississippi and soon his village was producing a surplus of crops, which was sold to the towns and villages in the southern part of French Louisiana. They especially needed the grain of the Illinois Country. The town was strategically located along fertile Mississippi River bottomland. Surpluses from the productive cultivation by habitants later helped supply critical wheat and corn to New Orleans and other lower Louisiana Territory communities. They did not have the climate to grow such crops.

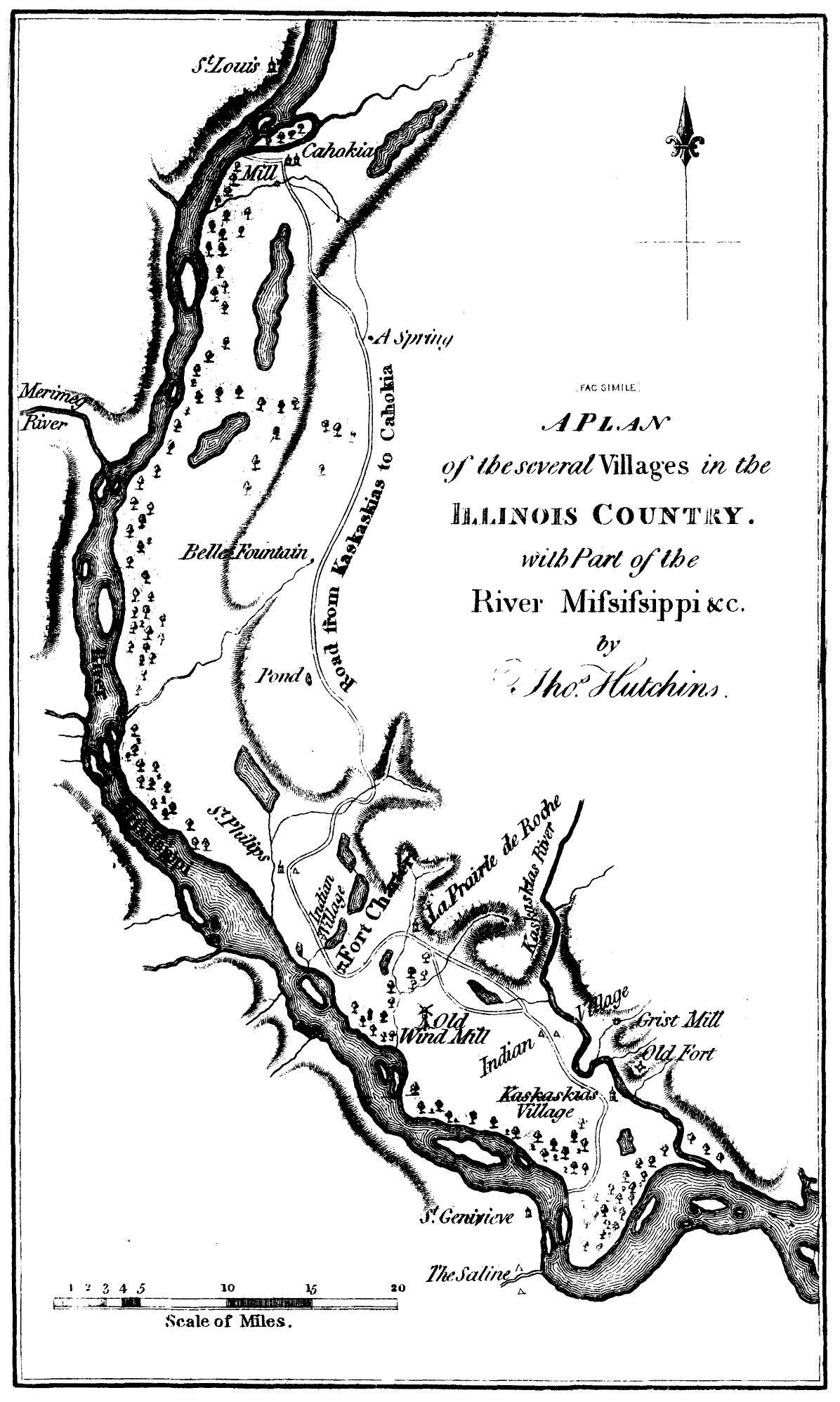
St. Philippe in the Illinois Country

D'Artaguette, an inspector in the country in the early 18th century, wrote:

"This country is one of the most beautiful in all Louisiana. Every kind of grain and vegetables are produced here in the greatest abundance.... They have, also, large numbers of oxen, cows, sheep, etc., upon the prairies. Poultry is abundant, and fish plentiful. So that, in fact, they lack none of the necessaries or conveniences of life."

Because habitants did not practice fertilization, the soil became exhausted. In addition, an increase in population meant there was not sufficient land for everyone. Some villagers moved to the west side of the Mississippi and founded Ste. Genevieve about 1750, in present-day Missouri. They quickly created an agricultural community with characteristics similar to St. Philippe.

=== British rule ===
Following their victory in the French and Indian War (also known as the Seven Years' War), the British gained possession of French lands east of the Mississippi, excluding New Orleans. The Treaty of Paris was signed in 1763; however, the British did not arrive in force until 1765. To avoid British rule, many of the town's French residents moved across the Mississippi River to towns such as Ste. Genevieve and St. Louis in what was now, via the secret Treaty of Fontainebleau, Spanish Louisiana. Additionally, King George III's Royal Proclamation of 1763 designated all the land west of the Appalachians and east of the Mississippi as an Indian Reserve. He tried to prevent settlers entering from the then-British Colonies.

=== American Revolution ===
During the American Revolutionary War, George Rogers Clark captured Prairie du Rocher for the colonies in his campaign that resulted in the capture of Vincennes, Indiana. Reportedly, his campaign caused some of the remaining French settlers to emigrate to the Spanish-controlled territories west of the Mississippi, leaving relatively few in Prairie du Rocher. Many of the subsequent settlers of the area had been members of Clark's campaign, or were related to someone who was. They were convinced of the promise of the area by tales of the fertility of the soil in the area now called American Bottom.

== Environmental impact ==
=== Flooding ===
The cutting of the forest trees and deforestation of the shoreline, on both sides of the Mississippi River, caused the river banks to collapse, which continuously flooded large tracts of land, including the village of St. Philippe.

=== Fort de Chartres ===
Fort de Chartres was a French military fort constructed in 1718, about three miles south of the colonial settlement of St. Philippe. It was a trading post established at the site of an Indian village.

In the 20th century, the fort was designated as an Illinois state historic site and partially reconstructed. Due to state budget cuts, in the fall of 2008, the fort was closed to visitors until the following spring. Since the fall of 2009, the fort has again been staffed and open to visitors.

=== Village abandonment ===
Because St. Philippe was within the floodplain of the American Bottom and suffered severe seasonal flooding, the village was eventually abandoned before 1765, as was Fort de Chartres.
