= Madonnaville, Illinois =

- Unincorporated community
- Location within Illinois Location within the United States
- Coordinates: 38°15′54″N 90°14′48″W
- Country: United States
- State: Illinois
- County: Monroe
- Precinct: 23
- Elevation: 732 ft (223 m)
- Time zone: UTC-6 (CST)
  - Summer (DST): UTC-5 (CDT)
- Postal code: 62298
- Area code: 618

Madonnaville, Illinois is a small unincorporated community in the historic Bluff Precinct of Monroe County, Illinois, United States. It was laid out by Joseph W. Ruebsam, who erected the first building and started a store there shortly thereafter. St. Mary's Catholic Church was built in 1857.
