= Lee Dashner =

American baseball player (1887-1959)

- Pitcher
- Born: April 25, 1887; Renault, Illinois, U.S.
- Died: December 16, 1959 (aged 72); El Dorado, Kansas, U.S.
- Batted: Both Threw: Left

MLB debut
- August 4, 1913, for the Cleveland Naps

Last MLB appearance
- August 4, 1913, for the Cleveland Naps

MLB statistics
- Win–loss record: 0–0
- Earned run average: 5.40
- Strikeouts: 2
- Stats at Baseball Reference

Teams
- Cleveland Naps (1913)

Lee Claire Dashner (April 25, 1887 – December 16, 1959) was an American Major League Baseball pitcher who played for one season. He played for the Cleveland Naps for one game on August 4, 1913.
