= Ames, Illinois =

- Unincorporated community
- Location within Illinois Location within the United States
- Coordinates: 38°08′48″N 90°03′16″W
- Country: United States
- State: Illinois
- County: Monroe
- Precinct: 9
- Elevation: 469 ft (143 m)
- Time zone: UTC-6 (CST)
  - Summer (DST): UTC-5 (CDT)
- Postal code: 62279
- Area code: 618

Ames is an unincorporated community in the Renault Precinct of Monroe County, Illinois, United States.

== History ==
Ames was originally called Yankeetown because many of the original settlers were Yankees. A post office named Ames was established in 1881 and remained in operation until 1907.
