= Baldwin Lake (Illinois) =

Reservoir in Illinois, United States

- Location within Illinois
- Location: Randolph / St. Clair counties, Illinois, U.S.
- Coordinates: 38°12′36″N 089°52′36″W
- Type: cooling pond
- Basin countries: United States
- Max. length: 2.5 mi (4.0 km)
- Surface area: 2,018 acres (817 ha)
- Average depth: 8 ft (2.4 m)
- Max. depth: 50 ft (15 m)
- Surface elevation: 423 ft (129 m)

Baldwin Lake is a 2,018-acre (817 ha) reservoir which spans part of the border between Randolph County, Illinois and St. Clair County, Illinois. The lake is part of the Kaskaskia River State Fish and Wildlife Area, near 38°13′03″N 089°52′09″W Elevation: 430 feet (130 m), operated by the Illinois Department of Natural Resources, and it is adjacent to, but not part of, the Kaskaskia River. Its elevation may fluctuate with powerplant operations, but averages 423 feet (129 m) above sea level.

== Operations ==
Baldwin Lake is a purpose-built cooling pond created by building an 8-mile (13 km) levee, near 38°12′36″N 089°52′36″W Elevation: 423 feet (129 m), around a patch of Kaskaskia River bottomland and dredging out sections of the area inside the levee. The lake is a perched cooling lake. Most of the lake is relatively shallow, with an average depth of 8 feet (2.4 m), but the lake has "holes" that are 50 feet (15 m) or more in depth. From the air, Baldwin Lake lacks the convoluted shape of many reservoirs. The lake's water surface is the shape of a rectangle.

Baldwin Lake was built by the Illinois Power Company as a cooling pond for its coal-fired Baldwin Generating Station, so called because the nearest town is Baldwin, Illinois. The Baldwin area sits atop a large seam of Illinois coal. The lake was begun in 1967, and completed and filled in 1970. Few if any tributaries flow naturally into Baldwin Lake; the lake is filled by water pumped from the nearby Kaskaskia River, supplemented by natural precipitation onto the surface of the lake.

With the Baldwin Station, Baldwin Lake has changed hands several times since its construction as a result of corporate takeover activity. The lake and generating plant were acquired by the Dynegy energy holding company in 1999. Soon afterwards, the station ceased to burn Illinois coal, instead burning low-sulfur coal from Wyoming. As of 2007, the Baldwin Station complex employed 169 workers and was capable of generating up to 1,750 megawatts. The large coal-fired boilers at Baldwin required as much as 10 million US gallons (38,000 m^{3}) of water per day to operate. Some of this water escaped as steam, and the rest was returned, heated, to the lake.

A significant spill of untreated wastewater from the Dynegy Midwest plant into Baldwin Lake was disclosed in February 2015. As a result, the state's Department of Natural Resources temporarily closed the Kaskaskia River State Fish and Wildlife Area to the public on February 4, 2015.

== Recreation ==
While Dynegy continues to own Baldwin Lake, they have transferred the operating rights over much of the lake (except that part closest to the power plant, which is closed to the public for security reasons) to the state of Illinois, which manages the lake for sport fishing. As with many power plant lakes, the lake is stocked with fish that are tolerant of the warm waters discharged from the power plant's boilers, such as largemouth bass and crappie.

Migratory bird species welcome the always-warm waters of Baldwin Lake, with peak populations of 20,000 ducks and 10,000 Canada geese noted. Approximately 200 geese live in and around the lake year-round. The Illinois Environmental Protection Agency (IEPA) considers the water quality of Baldwin Lake to be "fair," as is the water quality in the lower Kaskaskia River where most of the water in the lake came from.

The state of Illinois enforces a power limit on the lake, with allowable boat motors limited to no more than 50 horsepower (37 kW). Baldwin Lake is accessed from Illinois Route 154, which passes through the nearby towns of Baldwin, Sparta, and Red Bud.
