= Harrisonville, Illinois =

- Unincorporated community
- Etymology: William Henry Harrison
- Location within Illinois Location within the United States
- Coordinates: 38°16′39″N 90°21′00″W
- Country: United States
- State: Illinois
- County: Monroe
- Precinct: 15
- Elevation: 397 ft (121 m)
- Time zone: UTC-6 (CST)
  - Summer (DST): UTC-5 (CDT)
- Postal code: 62295
- Area code: 618

Harrisonville is an unincorporated community in the historic Harrisonville Precinct of Monroe County, Illinois.

== History ==
Harrisonville was the first county seat of Monroe County, and was originally called Carthage, or even earlier, in 1786, as Brashear's Fort. The name was changed by an act of the territorial assembly, in 1816, to honor William Henry Harrison, who actually owned several tracts of land in the area, mostly in Moredock precinct. However, sources suggest the name was already in common usage by 1810 or even earlier. The original site, some distance west of its current location has been swallowed up by the Mississippi River, and was obliterated by 1860. It was an important shipping point on the Mississippi River, lying on the bank directly opposite Herculaneum, Missouri and drawing on the agricultural production of the American Bottom.
