= John Merlo =

American politician

Member of the Chicago City Council from the 44th ward
- In office 1981–1983
- Preceded by: Bruce Young
- Succeeded by: Bernie Hansen

Personal details
- Born: September 12, 1912 Chicago, Illinois
- Died: August 9, 1992 (aged 79) Northwestern Memorial Hospital
- Party: Democratic
- Spouse: Meryle Merlo (née Strate)
- Children: Three

John Merlo (September 9, 1912 – August 9, 1992) was an American politician, who served for seven terms as an Illinois State Representative, for three years as an Illinois state senator, as well as for two years as a Chicago City Council alderman for Chicago's 44th Ward.

== Biography ==
John Merlo was born September 9, 1912, in Chicago to Mike Merlo, a leader of Unione Siciliana. In 1922, he moved from the south side to Lake View where he resided for the rest of his life. He joined the Chicago Park District in 1933, where he worked for decades. For a period of time, he was also the Secretary Edward J. Barrett's 44th Ward Regular Democratic Organization.

He was appointed to the Chicago City Council in 1981 after the resignation of Bruce Young. He won a special election to win served for two years before he stepped down. He was succeeded by Bernie Hansen.

He died August 9, 1992, at Northwestern Memorial Hospital. He was survived by his wife, Meryle, and three children.
