= Joseph De La Cour =

American politician

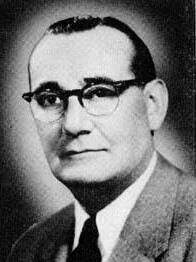
official portrait, circa 1961

Joseph Logue De La Cour (October 27, 1894 – February 11, 1967) was an American politician.

Born in Chicago, Illinois, De La Cour served in the United States Army in Europe during World War I and then briefly in the Irish Republican Army. He studied real estate law, banking, insurance, and parliamentary procedure in night school. He served as a civil service examiner for the city of Chicago and secretary of the Illinois Alcohol Control Commission. De La Cour also worked in the banking and brewery businesses. From 1947 to 1962, De La Cour served in the Illinois House of Representatives as a Democrat. In 1959, he was Chicago Mayor Richard J. Daley's choice for Speaker of the House, but downstate Democrat Paul Powell managed to build a coalition of Democratic and Republican representatives and won the election. From 1962 until 1967, when he died while still in office, De La Cour served in the Illinois State Senate. He died, at his home, in Chicago, Illinois.
