= Monroe County, Illinois =

County in Illinois, United States

- County
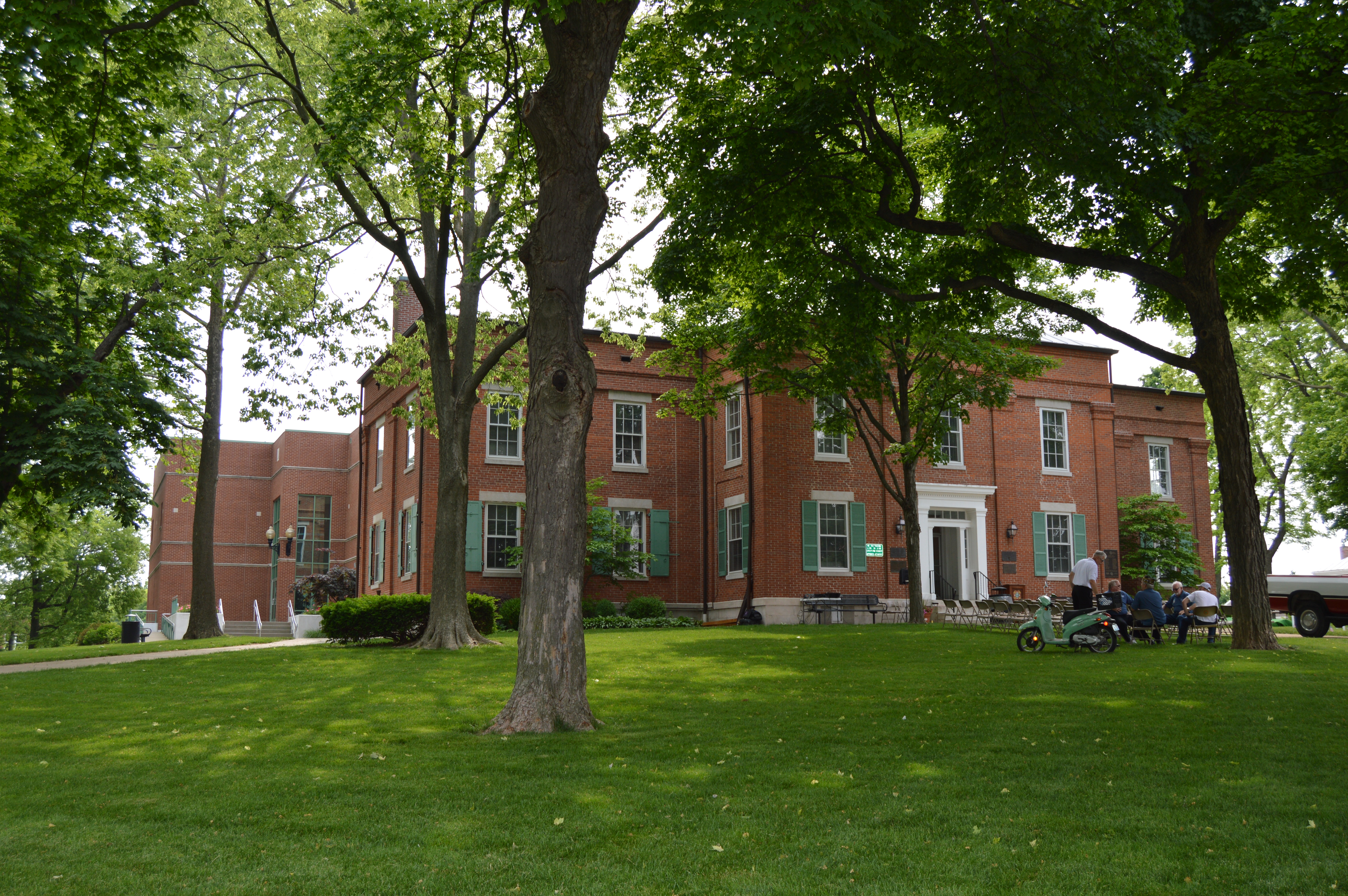
- Monroe County Courthouse in Waterloo

- Flag Seal Logo

- Location within the U.S. state of Illinois
- Coordinates: 38°17′N 90°11′W
- Country: United States
- State: Illinois
- Founded: 1816
- Named for: James Monroe
- Seat: Waterloo
- Largest city: Waterloo

Area
  - Total: 398 sq mi (1,030 km^{2})
  - Land: 385 sq mi (1,000 km^{2})
  - Water: 13 sq mi (34 km^{2}) 3.3%

Population (2020)
  - Total: 34,962
  - Estimate (2025): 34,840 ▼
  - Density: 90.8/sq mi (35.1/km^{2})
- Time zone: UTC−6 (Central)
  - Summer (DST): UTC−5 (CDT)
- Congressional district: 12th
- Website: monroecountyil.gov

Monroe County is a county located in the U.S. state of Illinois. According to the 2020 census, it had a population of 34,962. Its county seat and largest city is Waterloo. Monroe County is included in the St. Louis, MO-IL Metropolitan Statistical Area. It is located in the southern portion of Illinois known historically as "Little Egypt".

== History ==
Indigenous peoples lived along the Mississippi River and related waterways for thousands of years before European contact. French Jesuit priests in the Illinois Country encountered the Kaskaskia and Cahokia, bands of the Illiniwek confederacy.

The first European settlement in this area was St. Philippe, founded in 1723 by Philippe François Renault, a French courtier, on his concession about three miles north of Fort de Chartres along the Mississippi River. This early agricultural community quickly produced a surplus, and grains were sold to the lower Louisiana colony for years. They were integral to that community's survival, as its climate did not allow cultivation of such staple grains.

Monroe County was formed in 1816 out of Randolph and St. Clair counties, as the 8th county created from the then Illinois Territory.

Beginning on the Mississippi River where the base line, which is about three-fourths of a mile below Judge Briggs's present residence, strikes the said river; thence with the base line until it strikes the first township line therefrom; thence southeast to the southeast corner of township two south, range nine west; thence south to the southeast corner of township four north, range nine west; thence southwestwardly to the Mississippi, so as to include Alexander McNabb's farm, and thence up the Mississippi to the beginning shall constitute a separate county, to be called MONROE.
Illinois Territorial Laws 1815-16, p. 25

It was named in honor of James Monroe, who had just served as United States Secretary of War and who was elected President later that same year. Its first county seat was Harrisonville, named for William Henry Harrison, former governor of the Northwest Territory and future President. Harrison invested in several tracts of land in the American Bottoms above Harrisonville, mostly in the present precinct of Moredock, ownership of which he retained until his death.

Waterloo was designated as the mantle of county seat in 1825. The sites of the colonial towns of St. Philippe and Harrisonville were submerged by the Mississippi River, in flooding caused by deforestation of river banks during the steamboat years. Crews cut so many trees that banks destabilized and collapsed in the current, making the river wider and more shallow from St. Louis to the confluence with the Ohio River. This change caused more severe flooding, as well as lateral channel changes, such as the one that cut off the village of Kaskaskia from the Illinois mainland.

An unincorporated community of Harrisonville was re-established east of the original site. The bounds of Monroe County in 1816 did not include Precincts 1 and 6 (village of Hecker and Prairie du Long), Precinct 1 and most of 6 was added in 1825 from St. Clair County. The strip of Precinct 6 from the survey township line east to the Kaskaskia was added, once again from St. Clair, two years later in 1827. Some minor adjustments and clarifications of the boundaries have taken place, but the borders have remained essentially static since 1827.

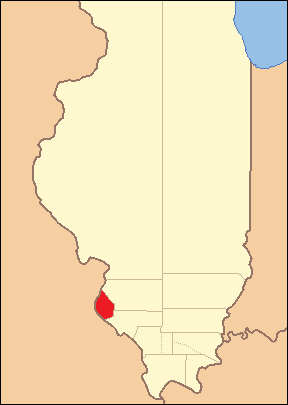
Monroe County from the time of its creation to 1825

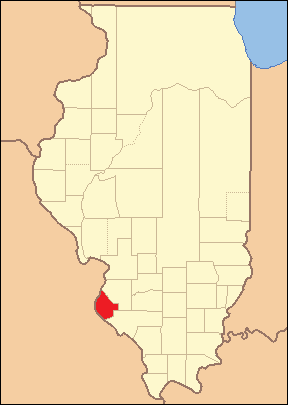
Monroe County between 1825 and 1827

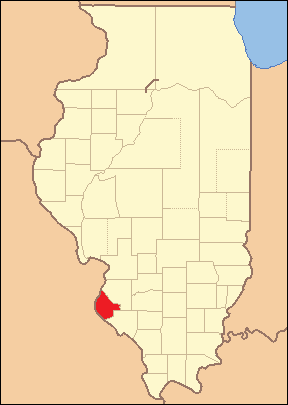
In 1827, an adjustment to Monroe County's border with St. Clair brought it to its present territory

== Geography ==
According to the U.S. Census Bureau, the county has a total area of 398 square miles (1,030 km^{2}), of which 385 square miles (1,000 km^{2}) is land and 13 square miles (34 km^{2}) (3.3%) is water.

The western part of the county on the Mississippi River is part of the American Bottom floodplain, while the eastern portion of the county is relatively flat and was originally prairie. The transition zone between has high bluffs of limestone and dolomite and has distinctive Karst topography with numerous sinkholes, caves, and springs. Mississippi River bluffs along Monroe County's western border make the county part of the “Illinois Ozarks.” The county's roughly 500 limestone sinkholes, most filled with dense woods, add to Monroe County's unusual visual appeal.

=== Climate and weather ===
Waterloo, Illinois

Climate chart (precipitation, max. and min. temperature)
J	F	M	A	M	J	J	A	S	O	N	D
2.3 38 20	2.4 44 25	3.7 55 35	4.2 66 45	4 76 55	4 84 64	4.3 89 68	3.1 87 66	3.4 80 59	3.1 69 47	4.2 54 36	3.4 42 25
- █ Average max. and min. temperatures in °F
- █ Precipitation totals in inches
- Source: The Weather Channel
Metric conversion
J	F	M	A	M	J	J	A	S	O	N	D
59 3 −7	61 7 −4	95 13 2	106 19 7	103 24 13	102 29 18	108 32 20	80 31 19	87 27 15	77 21 8	107 12 2	86 6 −4
- █ Average max. and min. temperatures in °C
- █ Precipitation totals in mm

In recent years, average temperatures in the county seat of Waterloo have ranged from a low of 20 °F (−7 °C) in January to a high of 89 °F (32 °C) in July, although a record low of −18 °F (−28 °C) was recorded in December 1989 and a record high of 107 °F (42 °C) was recorded in August 1962. Average monthly precipitation ranged from 2.32 inches (59 mm) in January to 4.25 inches (108 mm) in July.

=== Major highways ===
- Interstate 255
- U.S. Highway 50
- Illinois Route 3
- Illinois Route 156
- Illinois Route 158
- Illinois Route 159

=== Adjacent counties ===
- St. Clair County - northeast
- Randolph County - southeast
- Ste. Genevieve County, Missouri - south
- Jefferson County, Missouri - west
- St. Louis County, Missouri - northwest

== Demographics ==
Historical population
Census	Pop.	Note	%±
1820	1,537		—
1830	2,000		30.1%
1840	4,481		124.1%
1850	7,679		71.4%
1860	12,832		67.1%
1870	12,982		1.2%
1880	13,682		5.4%
1890	12,948		−5.4%
1900	13,847		6.9%
1910	13,508		−2.4%
1920	12,839		−5.0%
1930	12,369		−3.7%
1940	12,754		3.1%
1950	13,282		4.1%
1960	15,507		16.8%
1970	18,831		21.4%
1980	20,117		6.8%
1990	22,422		11.5%
2000	27,619		23.2%
2010	32,957		19.3%
2020	34,962		6.1%
2025 (est.)	34,840	▼	−0.3%
U.S. Decennial Census; 1790-1960 1900-1990; 1990-2000 2010-2013 2020

=== 2020 census ===
As of the 2020 census, the county had a population of 34,962. The median age was 42.8 years. 22.8% of residents were under the age of 18 and 18.9% of residents were 65 years of age or older. For every 100 females there were 98.7 males, and for every 100 females age 18 and over there were 95.7 males age 18 and over.

The racial makeup of the county was 94.0% White, 0.3% Black or African American, 0.2% American Indian and Alaska Native, 0.5% Asian, <0.1% Native Hawaiian and Pacific Islander, 0.5% from some other race, and 4.5% from two or more races. Hispanic or Latino residents of any race comprised 1.8% of the population.

58.5% of residents lived in urban areas, while 41.5% lived in rural areas.

There were 13,752 households in the county, of which 31.8% had children under the age of 18 living in them. Of all households, 60.7% were married-couple households, 13.9% were households with a male householder and no spouse or partner present, and 20.5% were households with a female householder and no spouse or partner present. About 23.1% of all households were made up of individuals and 11.8% had someone living alone who was 65 years of age or older.

There were 14,540 housing units, of which 5.4% were vacant. Among occupied housing units, 81.9% were owner-occupied and 18.1% were renter-occupied. The homeowner vacancy rate was 0.9% and the rental vacancy rate was 5.4%.

=== Racial and ethnic composition ===
Monroe County, Illinois – Racial and ethnic composition Note: the US Census treats Hispanic/Latino as an ethnic category. This table excludes Latinos from the racial categories and assigns them to a separate category. Hispanics/Latinos may be of any race.
Race / Ethnicity (NH = Non-Hispanic)	Pop 1980	Pop 1990	Pop 2000	Pop 2010	Pop 2020	% 1980	% 1990	% 2000	% 2010	% 2020
White alone (NH)	19,907	22,132	27,156	31,991	32,680	98.96%	98.71%	98.32%	97.07%	93.47%
Black or African American alone (NH)	18	9	11	64	118	0.09%	0.04%	0.04%	0.19%	0.34%
Native American or Alaska Native alone (NH)	19	51	47	57	53	0.09%	0.23%	0.17%	0.17%	0.15%
Asian alone (NH)	38	57	85	142	186	0.19%	0.25%	0.31%	0.43%	0.53%
Native Hawaiian or Pacific Islander alone (NH)	x	x	1	6	2	x	x	0.00%	0.02%	0.01%
Other race alone (NH)	6	7	4	8	66	0.03%	0.03%	0.01%	0.02%	0.19%
Mixed race or Multiracial (NH)	x	x	112	239	1,211	x	x	0.41%	0.73%	3.46%
Hispanic or Latino (any race)	129	166	203	450	646	0.64%	0.74%	0.74%	1.37%	1.85%
Total	20,117	22,422	27,619	32,957	34,962	100.00%	100.00%	100.00%	100.00%	100.00%

=== 2010 census ===
As of the 2010 United States census, there were 32,957 people, 12,589 households, and 9,375 families residing in the county. The population density was 85.6 inhabitants per square mile (33.1/km^{2}). There were 13,392 housing units at an average density of 34.8 per square mile (13.4/km^{2}). The racial makeup of the county was 98.0% white, 0.4% Asian, 0.2% American Indian, 0.2% black or African American, 0.3% from other races, and 0.8% from two or more races. Those of Hispanic or Latino origin made up 1.4% of the population. In terms of ancestry, 53.9% were German, 16.5% were Irish, 9.6% were English, and 6.2% were American.

Of the 12,589 households, 34.7% had children under the age of 18 living with them, 62.9% were married couples living together, 7.9% had a female householder with no husband present, 25.5% were non-families, and 21.5% of all households were made up of individuals. The average household size was 2.59 and the average family size was 3.02. The median age was 41.0 years.

The median income for a household in the county was $68,253 and the median income for a family was $80,832. Males had a median income of $55,988 versus $39,375 for females. The per capita income for the county was $31,091. About 3.5% of families and 4.5% of the population were below the poverty line, including 4.3% of those under age 18 and 2.4% of those age 65 or over.

== Transportation ==
=== Highways ===
- Interstate 255 Overlaps U.S. Highway 50 From Jefferson Barracks Bridge and Missouri east to Route 3 north of Columbia, then north toward Dupo

Provides access to the Interstate System, South Saint Louis County via the J.B. bridge as well as Downtown St. Louis and western St. Clair County

- U.S. Highway 50 Overlaps Interstate 255 From Jefferson Barracks Bridge and Missouri east to Route 3 north of Columbia, then north toward Dupo

Provides access to the Interstate System, South Saint Louis County via the J.B. bridge as well as Downtown St. Louis and western St. Clair County

- Illinois Route 3 From Interstate 255 and Dupo south southeast through Columbia and Waterloo on turning east toward Red Bud

Main north-south corridor and the backbone of Monroe County

- Illinois Route 156 From western terminus at Valmeyer east through Waterloo to Hecker and on to the eastern terminus at Illinois Route 13 west of New Athens and south of Freeburg

Briefly overlaps Illinois Route 159 in and just north of Hecker
Also called the Valmeyer highway or Hecker highway, west and east of Waterloo, respectively, it runs from the bluffs of the Mississippi to the Kaskaskia

- Illinois Route 158 From western terminus south of Columbia at Route 3, east northeast toward Millstadt

The area's main link with central and eastern St. Clair County for those not near Hecker

- Illinois Route 159 From southern terminus in Red Bud at Route 3 and Route 154, north through Prairie du Long to Hecker and on toward Smithton

Briefly overlaps Illinois Route 156 in and just north of Hecker
Significant eastern north-south corridor, provides alternate routes, and primary north-south link for Prairie Du Long and Hecker

=== County roads ===
- Bluff Road

runs along the bluffs from Palmer Rd. northwest of Columbia, through old Valmeyer and Chalfin Bridge, past Fults to Prairie du Rocher in Randolph County

- Maeystown Road

runs from Illinois Route 3 in Waterloo (as Lakeview Drive) through Wartburg and Maeystown to Bluff Rd. at Chalfin Bridge

- Kaskaskia Road

historic route from Kaskaskia to St. Louis, leaves Illinois Route 3 south of Waterloo, passes through Burksville and St. Joe, descends into the Bottoms outside Renault, crosses Bluff Rd. and railroad tracks to Stringtown Rd.

- Hanover Road

Runs from Route 3 west, past New Hanover down the Fountain Gap to Bluff Rd. at Miles Rd. and B Rd.. Marks approximate future border between Columbia and Waterloo.

- Gall Road

Northern terminus at Rt. 3/Main St. four-way in Columbia, south across Hanover Rd., and southern terminus at HH Rd. northwest of Waterloo and near Annbriar Golf Course.

- HH Road

Runs from Gilmore Lakes Rd., north of Floraville Rd., west across Route 3 in Waterloo (as Country Club Ln.) to Bluff Rd. east of Fountain

- KK Road

Runs from the Mississippi River levee opposite Crystal City, Missouri, west across Bluff Rd. up the bluffs at Monroe City, through Madonnaville, across Maeystown Rd., through Burksville and Burksville Station, across Route 3 to J Rd. south of Route 156

- LL Road

With a western terminus at Franklin St. in Maeystown, it travels east across Kaskaskia Rd., through Tipton, across Route 3, temporarily overlaps with J Rd. for about 0.5 miles east of Rt. 3 and west of Rt. 159, crosses Rt. 159 south of Hecker and north of Red Bud, ends with eastern terminus at Beck Rd. just west of the Kaskaskia River and near the Nike Missile Site.

=== Public Transportation ===
There is a regular MetroBus express bus, 502X Waterloo-Columbia, running from Waterloo, through Columbia, to the MetroLink station in East St. Louis.

=== Rivers ===
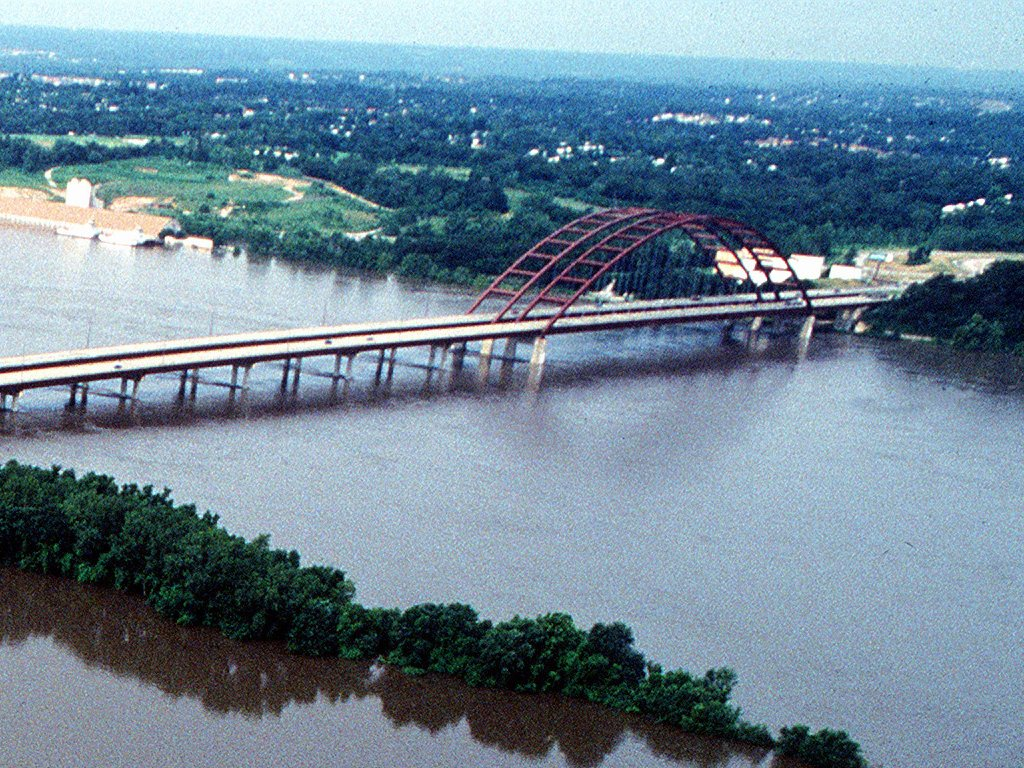
J. B. Bridge during the flood of 1993

- Mississippi River

Bridges and ferries

Jefferson Barracks Bridge - crosses the Mississippi northwest of Columbia, carries Interstate 255

Access

none

- Kaskaskia River

Bridges and ferries

none

Access

none

The closest access to and bridges over the Kaskaskia are downriver at Baldwin in Randolph County via Route 154 and upriver at New Athens in St. Clair County via Route 13. South of Monroe County, there is a ferry across the Mississippi in Randolph County, providing access to Ste. Genevieve, Missouri and Pere Marquette State Park, and a bridge at Chester via Route 150.

=== Rail ===
While the railroad played a large part in the history and development of the county, the main line through the county, running along Illinois Route 3, has been abandoned and removed. However, Union Pacific tracks run through the Bottoms from the intermodal yard at Dupo in St. Clair County, running roughly parallel to Bluff Rd. which crosses them several times, through old Valmeyer and Fults on past Prairie du Rocher in Randolph County. The tracks are still in use, but carry only freight, and have no stops in Monroe County.

=== Aviation ===
There is a small airfield in the Bottoms west of Columbia called Sackman Field.

== Communities ==
=== Cities ===
- Columbia
- Waterloo

=== Villages ===
- Fults
- Hecker
- Maeystown
- Valmeyer

=== Unincorporated communities ===
- Ames
- Burksville
- Burksville Station
- Chalfin Bridge
- Fountain
- Harrisonville
- Madonnaville
- Merrimac
- Monroe City
- New Hanover
- Renault
- St. Joe
- Tipton
- Wartburg

=== Former Settlement ===
- St. Philippe

== Precincts ==
For census and election purposes, Monroe County is currently divided into 37 numbered precincts. However, for geographical, genealogical, and historic purposes the older, named precincts are of greater utility.

- Bluff Precinct

named for the ubiquitous limestone cliffs it sits atop and which run along its western bounds.

- Columbia Precinct

formerly Eagle Precinct from the original French name for their settlement, L'Aigle

- Harrisonville Precinct

honors William Henry Harrison who also gave his name to a settlement

- Mitchie Precinct

so named for the Mitchegamie Indians who at one time inhabited the extreme southern part of the county

- Moredock Precinct

after John Moredock, territorial legislator, and Major commanding a battalion in the War of 1812

- New Design Precinct

named after the settlement began by James Lemen, a confidante of Thomas Jefferson, in 1786

- New Hanover Precinct

as with the settlement, its name recalls Hanover, Germany, hometown of the settlement's founder

- Prairie Du Long Precinct

from hybrid French/English "Long Prairie", it was added in 1825, after the county's genesis, the strip along the river in 1827.

- Renault Precinct

also a settlement, for Philip Francois Renault of the French Company of the Indies, an early exploiter of the area

- Waterloo Precinct

formerly Fountain Precinct, from Fountain Creek which runs through it on its way to the bluffs and down to the river

== Government ==
Monroe County, along with neighboring Randolph County, is located within Regional Office of Education #45.

== Politics ==
Monroe County was hostile to the “Yankee” Civil War owing to Copperhead sentiment and voted solidly Democratic until Theodore Roosevelt carried the county in 1904. Since that time, however, the county has become predominately Republican, and the only Democrats to gain a majority since 1904 have been Catholic Al Smith in 1928, Franklin D. Roosevelt in 1932 and 1936, and Lyndon Johnson in 1964. Since 1968, Monroe County has been carried by the Republican Presidential nominee in every election except when Bill Clinton won a narrow plurality in 1992.

United States presidential election results for Monroe County, Illinois
Year	Republican		Democratic		Third party(ies)	
Year	No.	%	No.	%	No.	%
1892	1,153	40.05%	1,611	55.96%	115	3.99%
1896	1,446	46.18%	1,652	52.76%	33	1.05%
1900	1,535	46.40%	1,757	53.11%	16	0.48%
1904	1,622	52.32%	1,440	46.45%	38	1.23%
1908	1,733	52.95%	1,512	46.20%	28	0.86%
1912	1,433	45.42%	1,398	44.31%	324	10.27%
1916	2,825	56.91%	2,104	42.39%	35	0.71%
1920	2,955	70.11%	932	22.11%	328	7.78%
1924	2,390	48.35%	1,369	27.70%	1,184	23.95%
1928	2,721	48.03%	2,934	51.79%	10	0.18%
1932	2,186	34.93%	3,993	63.80%	80	1.28%
1936	3,226	47.09%	3,477	50.76%	147	2.15%
1940	4,754	62.54%	2,826	37.17%	22	0.29%
1944	4,032	66.00%	2,068	33.85%	9	0.15%
1948	3,403	62.65%	2,026	37.30%	3	0.06%
1952	4,528	65.07%	2,430	34.92%	1	0.01%
1956	4,715	64.03%	2,648	35.96%	1	0.01%
1960	4,731	58.17%	3,398	41.78%	4	0.05%
1964	3,936	46.08%	4,605	53.92%	0	0.00%
1968	5,086	55.48%	2,822	30.78%	1,259	13.73%
1972	6,479	68.44%	2,958	31.25%	29	0.31%
1976	5,602	57.66%	3,984	41.00%	130	1.34%
1980	6,315	63.63%	3,121	31.45%	488	4.92%
1984	6,936	67.89%	3,256	31.87%	25	0.24%
1988	6,275	57.83%	4,529	41.74%	47	0.43%
1992	4,807	38.33%	4,894	39.02%	2,841	22.65%
1996	5,350	46.38%	4,798	41.60%	1,387	12.02%
2000	7,632	55.32%	5,797	42.02%	367	2.66%
2004	9,468	57.84%	6,788	41.47%	114	0.70%
2008	9,881	54.50%	7,953	43.87%	295	1.63%
2012	10,888	62.24%	6,215	35.53%	391	2.24%
2016	12,629	65.25%	5,535	28.60%	1,190	6.15%
2020	14,142	66.69%	6,569	30.98%	495	2.33%
2024	14,055	66.88%	6,473	30.80%	486	2.31%

== Education ==
- Columbia Community Unit School District 4
- Valmeyer Community Unit School District 3
- Waterloo Community Unit School District 5

== See also ==
- Fountain Creek Bridge
- Illinois Caverns State Natural Area
- Kaskaskia River State Fish and Wildlife Area
- National Register of Historic Places listings in Monroe County, Illinois
