= New Hanover, Illinois =

- Unincorporated community
- Etymology: Hanover, Germany hometown of founder
- Location within Illinois Location within the United States
- Coordinates: 38°23′12″N 90°13′38″W
- Country: United States
- State: Illinois
- County: Monroe
- Precinct: 11
- Elevation: 577 ft (176 m)
- Time zone: UTC-6 (CST)
  - Summer (DST): UTC-5 (CDT)
- Postal code: 62298
- Area code: 618

New Hanover, Illinois is a small unincorporated community in Monroe County, Illinois, United States. It derives its name from Hanover, Germany, of which many of the immediate area's settlers, including notably Henry B. Stehr, its founder, were natives. It was platted and surveyed by Hugo Ropiquet, county surveyor, January 17, 1860. The first house, a frame dwelling, was built by John Karius about 1845. New Hanover also gave its name to a historic precinct of Monroe County, which was carved out of Bluff, and the former Eagle and Fountain Precincts (later renamed Columbia and Waterloo, respectively) in 1875 and comprised the territory surrounding it.
