= Philip François Renault =

French politician

Philippe François Renault
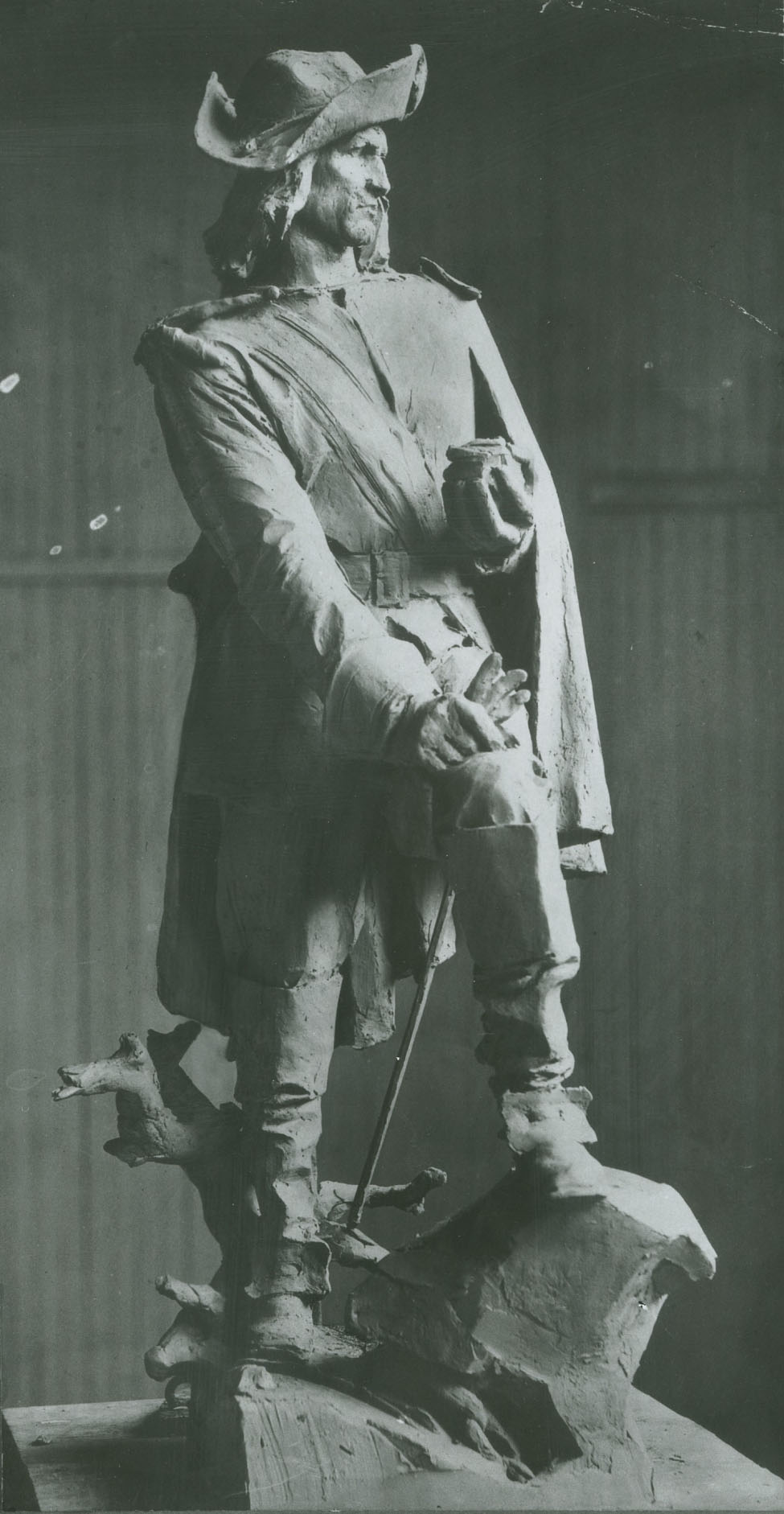
- Born: c. 1686; Picardy (present-day Hauts-de-France), Kingdom of France
- Died: 24 April 1755; Prieuré de Sankin Commune d'Estrées, Kingdom of France
- Occupations: Politician, businessman, explorer, slave owner, metallurgist, landowner, mine owner, city planner
- Employer(s): Company of the Indies, French government, self-employed
- Known for: Developing early lead mines in the Illinois Country in French North America for King Louis XV, as well as founding St. Philippe, an early agricultural community, on the Mississippi River
- Spouse: Celestine Pochez
- Children: 5
- Parent(s): Philippe Renault and Marie Jeane Baillet

Philippe François Renault (c. 1686 – 24 April 1755) was a French politician, businessman, explorer, metallurgist, and favorite courtier of King Louis XV of France, who left his native Picardy in 1719 for the Illinois Country, Upper Louisiana, in French North America.

Renault was an important contributor to early efforts at mining, especially for lead, in the French colonies, which began in earnest when he transported African slaves from Saint-Domingue to settlements on the Mississippi River. More successful than his lead mines was his concession of land on the east bank of the river, on which he founded St. Philippe, an early agricultural community. The village quickly became prosperous by exporting surpluses to other settlements on the river.

== Early life ==
Renault was born in Picardy, in northern France. His father, Philippe Renault, was a wealthy iron founder at Cousolre, near Maubeuge, and a stockholder in the Royal Company of the Indies.

== Company of the Indies ==
Renault was appointed director-general of mining operations by the Company of the West, which had been formed by the French for the exploitation of their American possessions. It acquired the French East India Company and became the Company of the Indies in 1719.

== Lead mining operations and use of slave labor ==
In the early 1720s, Renault purchased 200 (some sources say 500) African slaves in the French colony of Saint-Domingue (now Haiti) for labor in the mines he planned to develop. These men were the first enslaved Africans brought to the Illinois and Missouri regions. In 1723, Renault was granted "in freehold, in order to make his establishment upon the mines" a tract of land a league and a half in a width by six in depth on the Little Marameig in Missouri; another tract of two leagues "at the mine called the mine of Lamothe"; another of one league in front of Pimeteau on the Illinois River; and "one league fronting on the Mississippi, at the place called the Great Marsh, adjoining on one side to the Illinois Indians, settled near Fort de Chartres, with a depth of two leagues, this place being the situation which has been granted to him for the raising of provisions, and to enable him to furnish then to all the settlements he shall make upon the mines." Upon the latter land grant in the Illinois Country, Renault expected to grow food for his mining operations, taking advantage of the rich, black soil of what would later become known as the "American Bottom".

Like most enterprising Europeans of the time, Renault initially sought precious metals such as silver and gold, but these efforts were largely futile. Instead he discovered commercial value in great quantities of lead ore in the hills of southeastern Missouri. He is credited with operating the first viable lead mines in Missouri's Lead Belt at La Vieille Mine (the present-day community of Old Mines) and Mine La Motte. The port at Ste. Genevieve, founded in 1735, eventually became the primary connection between Renault's mines and the rest of New France.

== Founding and abandonment of St. Philippe ==
Renault founded the French settlement of St. Philippe in the southern part of present-day Monroe County, Illinois, approximately three miles north of Fort de Chartres, along the Mississippi River. Agriculture was the most successful of his enterprises. The community of St. Philippe quickly produced a surplus, which it sold to settlers downriver in New Orleans, as well as other French settlements such as Arkansas Post, where farming was less successful. Destructive seasonal flooding finally forced the French inhabitants of St. Philippe and Fort de Chartres to abandon the area before 1765.

By the middle of the 19th century, the deforestation of the banks of the Mississippi River, as a result of logging operations to supply steamboats with fuel, led to increased unnatural erosion and flooding, as well as drastic channel shifts which later destroyed and submerged Kaskaskia, Illinois. The damage caused by the river, especially in the Great Flood of 1993, obliterated the archaeological remains of St. Philippe, destroying the historical evidence beneath the layers of washed-away soil.

== Later years and death ==
Philippe François Renault eventually sold his slaves to other settlers and returned to France in 1749, passing his business interests in the Illinois Country on to others. Renault died on 24 April 1755, in France, intestate and without heirs. In the early and late 19th century, attempts by persons claiming to represent the Renault estate to reclaim lands he was granted met with little success.

=== Descendants and family holdings ===
By the late 19th century, the descendants of Renault's brothers, Armand and Jacques, both of whom had emigrated to the east coast of the United States, had changed the spelling of their name to Reno, an Anglicization of the sound. In 1888, the Reno Association, comprising 400 descendants mostly in New York and Pennsylvania, tried to claim the earlier holdings to Renault, without success. By then his former lands in Illinois and Missouri were estimated to be worth $40,000,000.
