= Judy Erwin =

American politician

Judy Erwin (born March 7, 1950) is a former American politician, educator, and public relations executive.

Born in Detroit, Michigan, Erwin received her bachelor's degree in education from University of Wisconsin–Whitewater and her master's degree from National Louis University. She also did graduate work at University of Illinois at Chicago and at the John F. Kennedy School of Government. Erwin was a public school teacher and a public relations executive. She lived in Chicago, Illinois. Erwin was involved in the Democratic Party. From 1993 to 2003, Erwin served in the Illinois House of Representatives.
