= Kathleen C. Moore =

American politician

Kathleen C. Moore is an American educator and politician.

Moore was a retired kindergarten teacher who lived in Lincoln Park in Chicago, Illinois. In 2010, Moore was appointed to the Illinois House of Representatives by the 11th Legislative District Democratic Committee succeeding John Fritchey who resigned early when he was elected to the Cook County Board of Commissioners. Moore served from December 29, 2010, until January 11, 2011. Ann Williams was elected to the seat, in the November 2010 Illinois general election. Williams was then sworn in, on January 12, 2011, and took the seat.
