= Steven G. Nash =

American politician

Steven G. Nash (December 13, 1938 – July 5, 1991) was an American Democratic politician.

Nash was born in Chicago, Illinois, where he was educated. He was involved in the real estate management business. He served in the Illinois Senate from 1979 to 1983, and in the Illinois House of Representatives from 1983 to 1987.

He died of a heart attack in Chicago, Illinois.
