= Fults, Illinois =

- Village
- Etymology: Jacob Fults, early settler
- Location in Monroe County, Illinois
- Coordinates: 38°09′52″N 90°12′46″W
- Country: United States
- State: Illinois
- County: Monroe
- Precinct: 13
- Founded: April 12, 1937

Area
  - Total: 0.054 sq mi (0.14 km^{2})
  - Land: 0.054 sq mi (0.14 km^{2})
  - Water: 0 sq mi (0.00 km^{2})
- Elevation: 397 ft (121 m)

Population (2020)
  - Total: 28
  - Density: 530/sq mi (204.8/km^{2})
- Time zone: UTC-6 (CST)
  - Summer (DST): UTC-5 (CDT)
- ZIP code: 62244
- Area code: 618
- FIPS code: 17-28170
- GNIS feature ID: 2398932

Fults is a village in the Renault precinct of Monroe County, Illinois, United States. The population was 28 at the 2020 census. It is located entirely within the American Bottom floodplain of the Mississippi River.

== Geography ==
Fults is 15 miles (24 km) south-southwest of Waterloo, the county seat, and 9 miles (14 km) northwest of Prairie du Rocher. The Mississippi River is 3 miles (5 km) to the southwest, while the bluffs that mark the edge of the floodplain rise a quarter mile to the northeast of the village.

According to the U.S. Census Bureau, the village has a total area of 0.05 square miles (0.13 km^{2}), all land.

== History ==
The village was named after Jacob Fults, born in Pennsylvania in 1793 to German immigrants. Fults, after leaving the service of the United States during the War of 1812 in 1817, settled on Moredock Lake. He then moved to the Renault precinct, first up Braun's Hollow, then in 1829 to the settlement known at the time as "Braunsberg", which would eventually take his name, until his death in 1841.

A site on the bluffs just north of Fults, overlooking the Bottoms, is known as Saltpeter Cave and took its name from the quantities of bat guano mined there for potassium nitrate, which was used in the local manufacture of black powder by the French at Fort de Chartres and later inhabitants. This cave, cut into the side of the bluffs and an excellent defensive position, was one of the last refuges for Native Americans in the region. It was a popular site in the area for rappelling and hiking, until access to it was restricted in the aftermath of the Great Flood of 1993 and several accidents at the site.

== Demographics ==
Historical population
Census	Pop.	Note	%±
1940	88		—
1950	120		36.4%
1960	90		−25.0%
1970	101		12.2%
1980	78		−22.8%
1990	45		−42.3%
2000	28		−37.8%
2010	26		−7.1%
2020	28		7.7%
U.S. Decennial Census

As of the census of 2000, there were 28 people, 9 households, and 8 families residing in the village. The population density was 411.2 inhabitants per square mile (158.8/km^{2}). There were 10 housing units at an average density of 146.9 per square mile (56.7/km^{2}). The racial makeup of the village was 100.00% White.

There were 9 households, out of which 33.3% had children under the age of 18 living with them, 88.9% were married couples living together, and 11.1% were non-families. No households were made up of individuals, and none had someone living alone who was 65 years of age or older. The average household size was 3.11 and the average family size was 3.25.

In the village, the population was spread out, with 21.4% under the age of 18, 21.4% from 18 to 24, 25.0% from 25 to 44, 28.6% from 45 to 64, and 3.6% who were 65 years of age or older. The median age was 41 years. For every 100 females there were 100.0 males. For every 100 females age 18 and over, there were 120.0 males.

The median income for a household in the village was $47,813, and the median income for a family was $48,438. Males had a median income of $33,750 versus $0 for females. The per capita income for the village was $11,389. None of the population and none of the families were below the poverty line.
