= Baldwin, Illinois =

Baldwin
- Village
- Location of Baldwin in Randolph County, Illinois.

- Location in Illinois Baldwin (the United States) Baldwin (North America)
- Coordinates: 38°11′02″N 89°50′43″W
- Country: United States
- State: Illinois
- County: Randolph

Area
  - Total: 0.66 sq mi (1.72 km^{2})
  - Land: 0.66 sq mi (1.72 km^{2})
  - Water: 0 sq mi (0.00 km^{2})
- Elevation: 459 ft (140 m)

Population (2020)
  - Total: 314
  - Density: 472/sq mi (182.1/km^{2})
- Time zone: UTC-6 (CST)
  - Summer (DST): UTC-5 (CDT)
- ZIP code: 62217
- Area code: 618
- FIPS code: 17-03454
- GNIS feature ID: 2398021

Baldwin is a town in Randolph County, Illinois, United States. As of the 2020 census, Baldwin had a population of 314. Baldwin Lake State Fish and Wildlife Area is nearby.

== Geography ==
According to the 2010 census, Baldwin has a total area of 0.67 square miles (1.74 km^{2}), all land.

== Demographics ==
Historical population
Census	Pop.	Note	%±
1880	271		—
1890	298		10.0%
1900	381		27.9%
1910	358		−6.0%
1920	353		−1.4%
1930	332		−5.9%
1940	341		2.7%
1950	354		3.8%
1960	336		−5.1%
1970	467		39.0%
1980	474		1.5%
1990	426		−10.1%
2000	3,627		751.4%
2010	373		−89.7%
2020	314		−15.8%
U.S. Decennial Census

=== 2020 census ===
Baldwin village, Illinois – Racial and ethnic composition Note: the US Census treats Hispanic/Latino as an ethnic category. This table excludes Latinos from the racial categories and assigns them to a separate category. Hispanics/Latinos may be of any race.
Race / Ethnicity (NH = Non-Hispanic)	Pop 2000	Pop 2010	Pop 2020	% 2000	% 2010	% 2020
White alone (NH)	1,200	360	294	33.09%	96.51%	93.63%
Black or African American alone (NH)	2,131	0	0	58.75%	0.00%	0.00%
Native American or Alaska Native alone (NH)	1	0	0	0.03%	0.00%	0.00%
Asian alone (NH)	6	1	0	0.17%	0.27%	0.00%
Pacific Islander alone (NH)	1	0	0	0.03%	0.00%	0.00%
Other race alone (NH)	0	0	0	0.00%	0.00%	0.00%
Mixed race or Multiracial (NH)	6	7	16	0.17%	1.88%	5.10%
Hispanic or Latino (any race)	282	5	4	7.78%	1.34%	1.27%
Total	3,627	373	314	100.00%	100.00%	100.00%

The 2000 census accidentally included the inmate population of Menard Correctional Center which actually located in Chester, Illinois hence the large population.

=== 2010 ===
As of the census of 2010, there were 373 people, 146 households, and 101 families residing in the village. The population density was 533 inhabitants per square mile (206/km^{2}). There were 161 housing units at an average density of 230 units per square mile (89 units/km^{2}). The racial makeup of the village was 97.9% White, 0.0% African American, 0.0% Native American, 0.3% Asian, 0.0% Pacific Islander, 0.0% some other race, and 1.9% from two or more races. Hispanic or Latino of any race were 1.3% of the population.

There were 146 households, out of which 28.1% had children under the age of 18 living with them, 47.9% were married couples living together, 13.7% had a female householder with no husband present, and 30.8% were non-families. 27.4% of all households were made up of individuals, and 6.9% had someone living alone who was 65 years of age or older. The average household size was 2.55 and the average family size was 3.06.

In the village, the population was spread out, with 24.7% under the age of 18, 9.7% from 18 to 24, 28.7% from 25 to 44, 26.1% from 45 to 64, and 11.0% who were 65 years of age or older. The median age was 36.5 years. For every 100 females, there were 100.5 males. For every 100 females age 18 and over, there were 99.3 males.

At the 2000 census, the median income for a household in the village was $32,083, and the median income for a family was $31,528. Males had a median income of $22,096 versus $25,147 for females. The per capita income for the village was $13,009. About 8.1% of families and 9.3% of the population were below the poverty line, including 13.2% of those under age 18 and none of those age 65 or over.
