= Maeystown, Illinois =

- Village
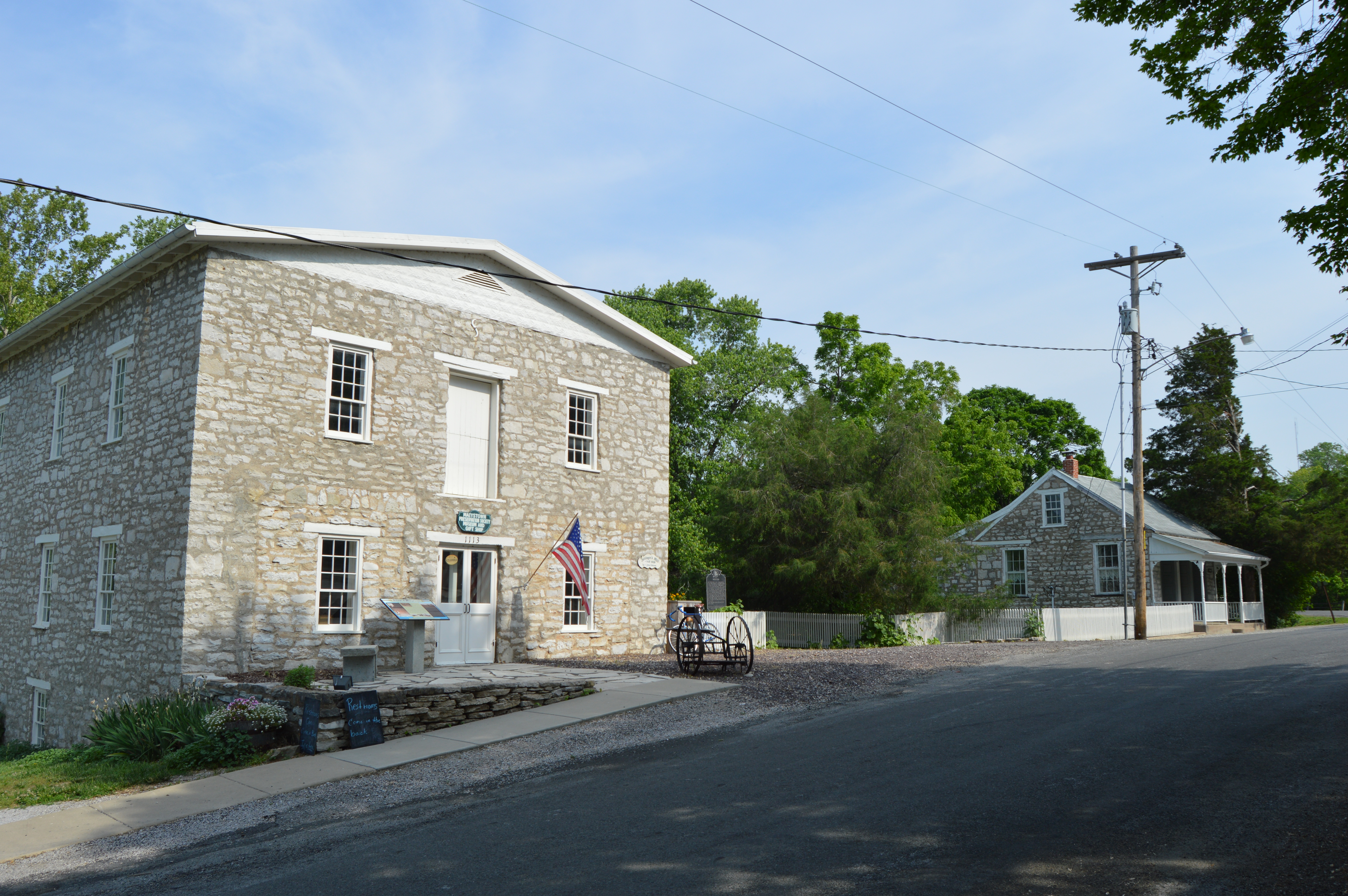
- Western side of Mill Street at the Franklin Street intersection
- Etymology: Jacob Maeys, early settler
- Location in Monroe County, Illinois
- Coordinates: 38°13′36″N 90°13′59″W
- Country: United States
- State: Illinois
- County: Monroe
- Precinct: 23
- Founded: 1904

Area
  - Total: 0.30 sq mi (0.77 km^{2})
  - Land: 0.29 sq mi (0.76 km^{2})
  - Water: 0.0039 sq mi (0.01 km^{2})
- Elevation: 476 ft (145 m)

Population (2020)
  - Total: 150
  - Density: 508.3/sq mi (196.26/km^{2})
- Time zone: UTC-6 (CST)
  - Summer (DST): UTC-5 (CDT)
- ZIP code: 62256
- Area code: 618
- FIPS code: 17-46058
- GNIS feature ID: 2399221

Maeystown is a village in Monroe County, Illinois, United States. The population was 150 at the 2020 census.

== Geography ==
Maeystown is located southwest of the center of Monroe County. It is 9 miles (14 km) southwest of Waterloo, the county seat. It sits in the valley of Maeystown Creek, which flows into the floodplain of the Mississippi River 2 miles (3 km) to the southwest.

According to the U.S. Census Bureau, the village has a total area of 0.30 square miles (0.78 km^{2}), of which 0.002 square miles (0.005 km^{2}), or 0.67%, are water.

== History ==
The history of the tract of land where what is now Maeystown is situated, began sometime after 1782, when a soldier of the American Revolution, one James McRoberts, staked a claim of 100 acres (40 ha) (Survey 704; Claim 316). He subsequently left the Illinois Territory for Tennessee, where he married Mary Fletcher-Harris, and returned in 1797, adding another 100 acres (0.40 km^{2}) to his holdings. It was on this second tract that he built his home, from cedar logs, and here he raised his family. McRoberts fathered ten children, the eldest, Samuel McRoberts, being the first native-born Illinoisan to serve in the United States Senate.

Maeystown may be said to have begun its growth as a town in the year 1852, when Jacob Maeys built a sawmill on what had become known as McRoberts Meadow, which he purchased in 1848. For a year after its construction the mill remained idle, on account of there not being sufficient water to drive it. Steam engines were then put in place, and the mill successfully operated. The first store was opened in 1858 by Jacob Maeys in partnership with Judge Abraham Poston. By this time some half a dozen houses had been erected in the place. A town had been surveyed and laid off in 1856 by Maeys, and called "Maeysville". A post office was established in 1860, which changed the name to Maeystown, with Jacob Maeys appointed as first postmaster.

The entire village, save for a small strip of land on the northeast side, is listed on the National Register of Historic Places as the Maeystown Historic District.

== Demographics ==
Historical population
Census	Pop.	Note	%±
1910	284		—
1920	270		−4.9%
1930	187		−30.7%
1940	160		−14.4%
1950	137		−14.4%
1960	158		15.3%
1970	109		−31.0%
1980	143		31.2%
1990	116		−18.9%
2000	148		27.6%
2010	157		6.1%
2020	150		−4.5%
U.S. Decennial Census

As of the census of 2000, there were 148 people, 54 households, and 44 families residing in the village. The population density was 487.3 inhabitants per square mile (188.1/km^{2}). There were 60 housing units at an average density of 197.6 per square mile (76.3/km^{2}). The racial makeup of the village was 97.97% White, 1.35% Asian, and 0.68% from two or more races. Hispanic or Latino of any race were 1.35% of the population.

There were 54 households, out of which 35.2% had children under the age of 18 living with them, 70.4% were married couples living together, 5.6% had a female householder with no husband present, and 18.5% were non-families. 16.7% of all households were made up of individuals, and 14.8% had someone living alone who was 65 years of age or older. The average household size was 2.74 and the average family size was 3.09.

In the village, the population was spread out, with 25.0% under the age of 18, 10.8% from 18 to 24, 29.1% from 25 to 44, 18.9% from 45 to 64, and 16.2% who were 65 years of age or older. The median age was 37 years. For every 100 females there were 111.4 males. For every 100 females age 18 and over, there were 94.7 males.

The median income for a household in the village was $40,417, and the median income for a family was $43,750. Males had a median income of $28,750 versus $16,250 for females. The per capita income for the village was $14,432. There were 5.0% of families and 4.1% of the population living below the poverty line, including no under eighteens and 11.1% of those over 64.
