= Burksville, Illinois =

- Unincorporated community
- Etymology: John G. Burkhardt, St. Louis merchant
- Location within Illinois Location within the United States
- Coordinates: 38°16′02″N 90°09′09″W
- Country: United States
- State: Illinois
- County: Monroe
- Precinct: 12
- Elevation: 650 ft (200 m)
- Time zone: UTC-6 (CST)
  - Summer (DST): UTC-5 (CDT)
- Postal code: 62298
- Area code: 618

Burksville is an unincorporated community in the historic New Design Precinct of Monroe County, Illinois, United States. Originally developed by John P. Brown, Burksville was named in 1857 after John G. Burkhardt, a resident of St. Louis, who opened a store there in 1851. It lies along the old Kaskaskia to St. Louis road off Illinois Route 3, south of Waterloo.
