= National Register of Historic Places listings in Macon County, Illinois =

Location of Macon County in Illinois

This is a list of the National Register of Historic Places listings in Macon County, Illinois.

This is intended to be a complete list of the properties and districts on the National Register of Historic Places in Macon County, Illinois, United States. Latitude and longitude coordinates are provided for many National Register properties and districts; these locations may be seen together in a map.

There are 11 properties and districts listed on the National Register in the county. Another property was once listed but has been removed.

This National Park Service list is complete through NPS recent listings posted March 21, 2025.

== Current listings ==
| | Name on the Register | Image | Date listed | Location | City or town | Description |
|---|---|---|---|---|---|---|
| 1 | Decatur Downtown Historic District | Decatur Downtown Historic District | May 9, 1985 (#85001011) | Merchant St. roughly bounded by North, Water, Wood, and Church Sts. 39°50′32″N 88°57′20″W | Decatur | |
| 2 | Decatur Historic District | Decatur Historic District | November 7, 1976 (#76000719) | Roughly bounded by Hayward, Eldorado, Church, and Lincoln Park Dr. 39°50′32″N 88°57′48″W | Decatur | |
| 3 | Garfield School | | September 5, 2024 (#100010784) | 1077 W. Grand Avenue; 39°51′17″N 88°58′20″W | Decatur | |
| 4 | James Millikin House | James Millikin House | December 3, 1974 (#74000765) | 125 N. Pine St. 39°50′31″N 88°58′01″W | Decatur | |
| 5 | Roosevelt Junior High School | Roosevelt Junior High School | May 9, 2002 (#02000462) | 701 W. Grand Ave. 39°51′16″N 88°57′55″W | Decatur | |
| 6 | Transfer House | Transfer House | December 3, 2002 (#02000843) | 1 Central Park East; 39°50′33″N 88°57′12″W | Decatur | |
| 7 | Trobaugh-Good House | Trobaugh-Good House | August 1, 1996 (#96000858) | 1495 Brozio Ln. 39°49′24″N 89°00′42″W | Decatur | |
| 8 | Eli Ulery House | Eli Ulery House | October 1, 1979 (#79000854) | Southeast of Mount Zion on County Route 60; 39°45′49″N 88°50′06″W | Mount Zion | |
| 9 | Union Church | Union Church | September 23, 1999 (#99000588) | 2.5 miles southeast of Oreana, on Kirby Rd. 39°55′13″N 88°50′53″W | Oreana | |
| 10 | Wabash Railroad Station and Railway Express Agency | Wabash Railroad Station and Railway Express Agency | February 4, 1994 (#94000029) | 780 E. Cerro Gordo St. 39°50′50″N 88°56′47″W | Decatur | |
| 11 | West End Historic District | West End Historic District | November 27, 2002 (#02001444) | Roughly bounded by S. Fairview Ave., Park Place, Fairview Park, Westdale Ave., W. Main St., Glencoe Ave., Sunset Ave. 39°50′24″N 88°59′04″W | Decatur | |

== Former listing ==
| | Name on the Register | Image | Date listed | Date removed | Location | City or town | Description |
|---|---|---|---|---|---|---|---|
| 1 | Decatur and Macon County Welfare Home for Girls | | August 12, 1999 (#99000982) | August 14, 2004 | 736 S. Martin Luther King Jr. Dr. | Decatur | Also known as Webster Hall. Demolished December 10, 2003. |
| 2 | Millikin Building | | July 24, 1979 (#79000853) | July 24, 1980 | 100 N. Water St. | Decatur | Demolished in June 1980. |

== See also ==
- List of National Historic Landmarks in Illinois
- National Register of Historic Places listings in Illinois
