= Decatur Downtown Historic District =

Decatur Downtown Historic District may refer to the following places:

- Decatur Downtown Historic District (Decatur, Georgia), listed on the National Register of Historic Places
- Decatur Downtown Historic District (Decatur, Illinois), listed on the National Register of Historic Places
