= Trobaugh =

Trobaugh is a surname. Notable people with the surname include:

- Edward Trobaugh (1932–2024), United States Army Major General
- Jules Trobaugh (born 1968), American artist specializing in photography

== See also ==
- Trobaugh-Good House
