= West End Historic District (Decatur, Illinois) =

Historic district in Illinois, United States

- U.S. National Register of Historic Places
- U.S. Historic district
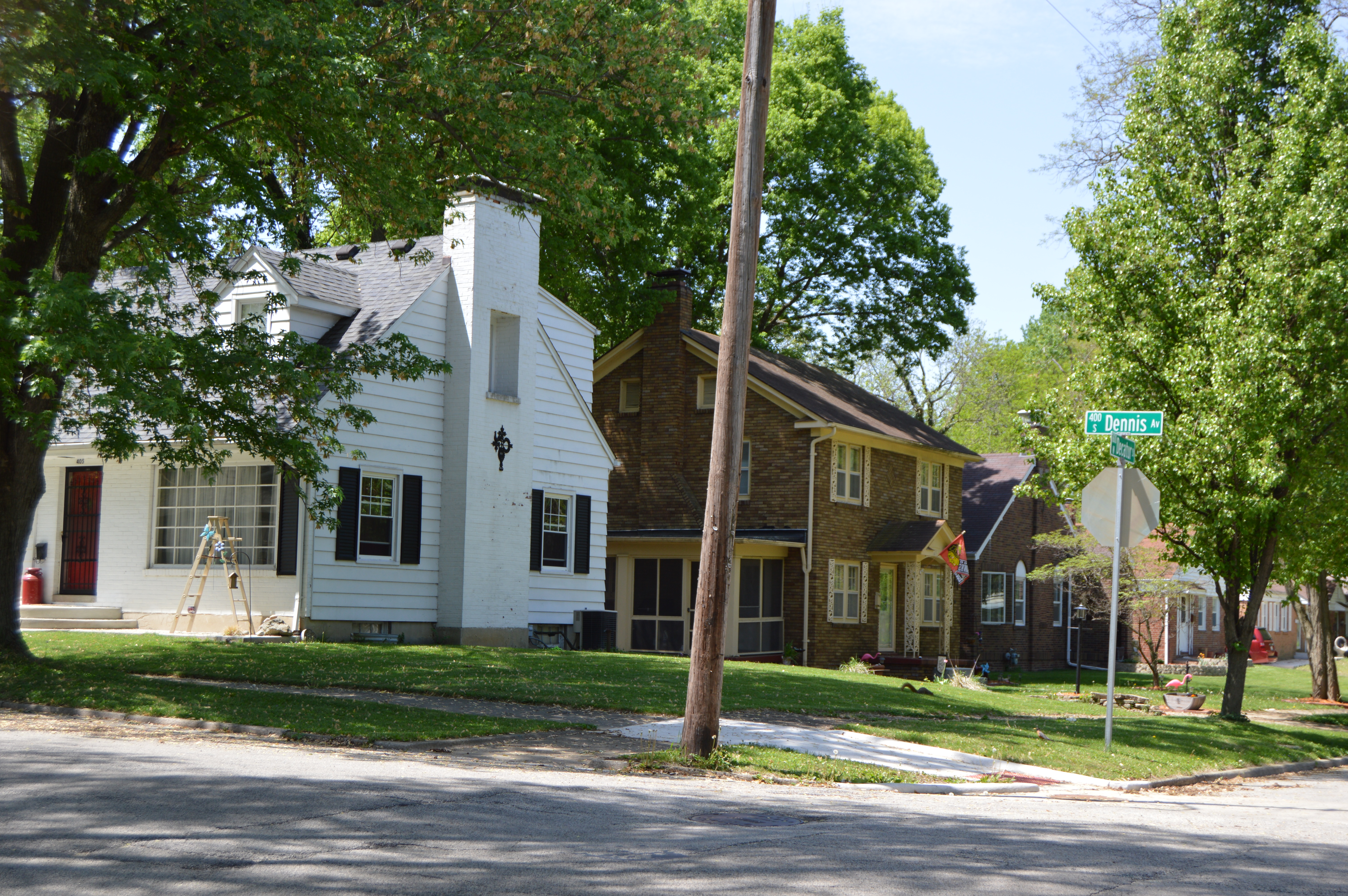
- The intersection of Dennis and Decatur Streets

- Location within Illinois Location within the United States
- Location: Roughly bounded by S. Fairview Ave., Park Place, Fairview Park, Westdale Ave., W. Main St., Glencoe Ave., Sunset Ave., Decatur, Illinois
- Coordinates: 39°50′24″N 88°59′04″W
- Area: 318 acres (129 ha)
- NRHP reference No.: 02001444
- Added to NRHP: November 27, 2002

The West End Historic District is a residential historic district located in western Decatur, Illinois. The district, which was primarily built in the first half of the 20th century, includes over 1,700 contributing buildings. The West End was a popular neighborhood for Decatur's business owners and managers at its large industries, and the majority of its residents came from upper-middle class occupations; however, the district also had many working-class residents. A diverse array of architecture is featured in the district; twenty-three different architectural styles and twelve vernacular types are represented in its homes. The Dutch Colonial Revival and American Craftsman styles are the most prevalent, along with the latter's related vernacular type, the bungalow; the English Revival, Colonial Revival, Prairie School, and Georgian Revival styles also had a significant influence on the district's character.

The district was added to the National Register of Historic Places on November 27, 2002.
