= Decatur Historic District =

Historic district in Illinois, United States

- U.S. National Register of Historic Places
- U.S. Historic district
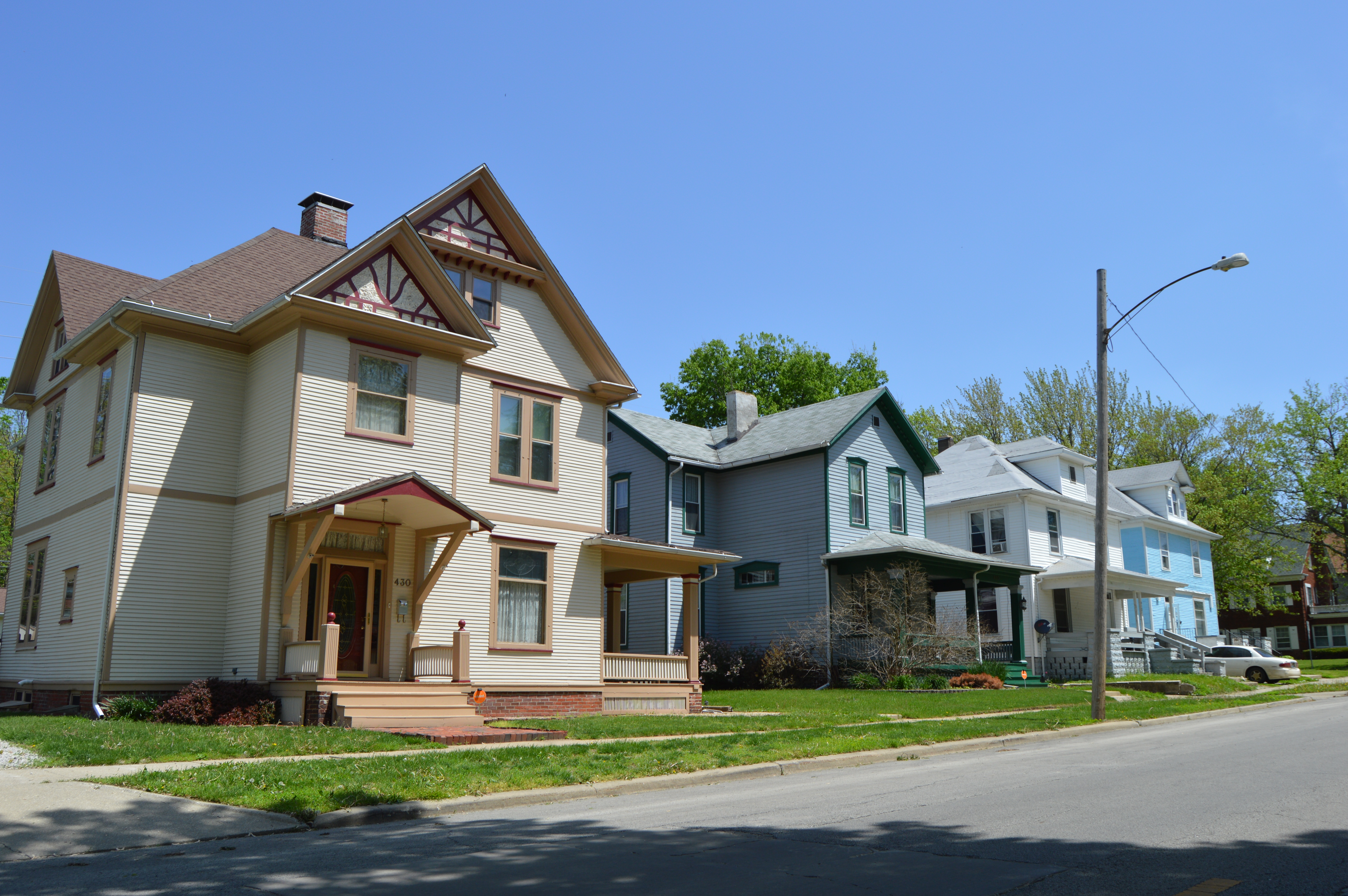

- Location within Illinois Location within the United States
- Location: Roughly bounded by Hayward, El Dorado, and Church, and Lincoln Park Dr., Decatur, Illinois
- Coordinates: 39°50′32″N 88°57′48″W
- Area: 258 acres (104 ha)
- NRHP reference No.: 76000719
- Added to NRHP: November 7, 1976

The Decatur Historic District is a residential historic district in the Millikin Heights neighborhood of Decatur, Illinois. The district encompasses the city's historic Near West and Southwest neighborhoods and was formed beginning in the 1850s and continuing through the 1920s. Nearly all of the popular architectural styles from this period are represented in the district. A number of professional architects, including Frank Lloyd Wright, designed homes in the district, giving it exceptionally high-quality architecture. The earlier houses mainly have Italianate designs; several Gothic Revival buildings from this period are also included. The Queen Anne and Classical Revival styles were popular in houses built in the late 19th century, though Romanesque and Tudor Revival houses were also designed in this period. The early 20th century brought the district the Colonial Revival style and several independent styles associated with the more prominent architects such as Wright.

The district was added to the National Register of Historic Places on November 7, 1976.
