= Decatur Downtown Historic District (Decatur, Illinois) =

Historic district in Illinois, United States

- U.S. National Register of Historic Places
- U.S. Historic district
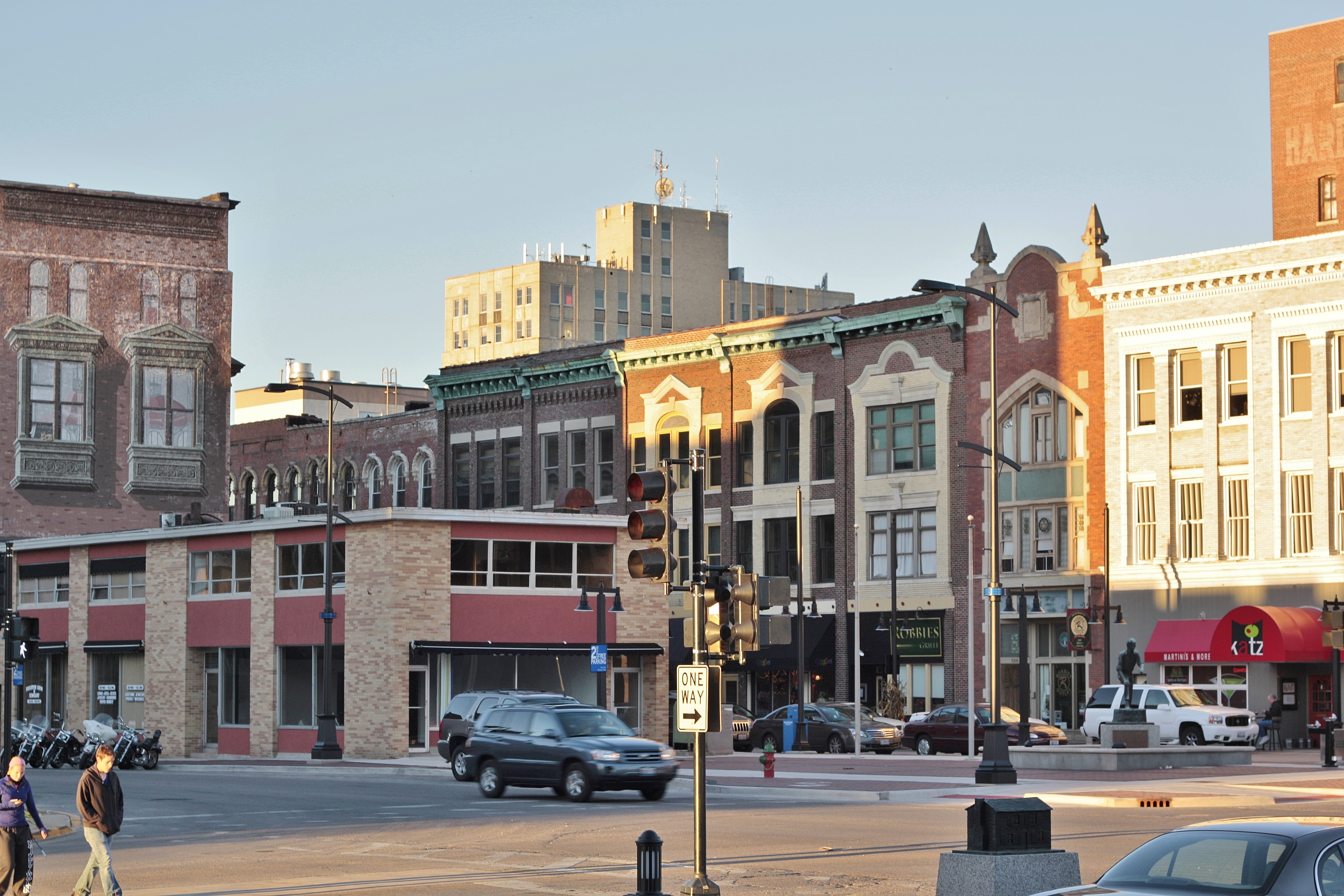

- Location within Illinois Location within the United States
- Location: Merchant St. roughly bounded by North, Water, Wood, and Church Sts., Decatur, Illinois
- Coordinates: 39°50′32″N 88°57′20″W
- Area: 18 acres (7.3 ha)
- Built: 1854
- Architect: Multiple
- Architectural style: Romanesque, Classical Revival, Commercial Italianate
- NRHP reference No.: 85001011
- Added to NRHP: May 9, 1985

The Decatur Downtown Historic District is a historic commercial district located in downtown Decatur, Illinois. The district includes 75 buildings, 61 of which are considered significant or contributing to its historic character. While downtown Decatur was platted in 1829, it did not experience significant commercial development until 1854, when two railroads built lines through the city; all but one of the district's contributing buildings were built between 1854 and 1916. The district includes many of the commercial buildings which were built in the economic boom following the railroad's construction. These buildings represent several popular commercial architectural styles of the period, including Classical Revival, Italianate, Romanesque, and Chicago School. The district also includes several sites connected to Abraham Lincoln's legal and political career.

The district was added to the National Register of Historic Places on May 9, 1985.
