= Trobaugh-Good House =

Historic house in Illinois, United States

- Trobaugh--Good House
- U.S. National Register of Historic Places
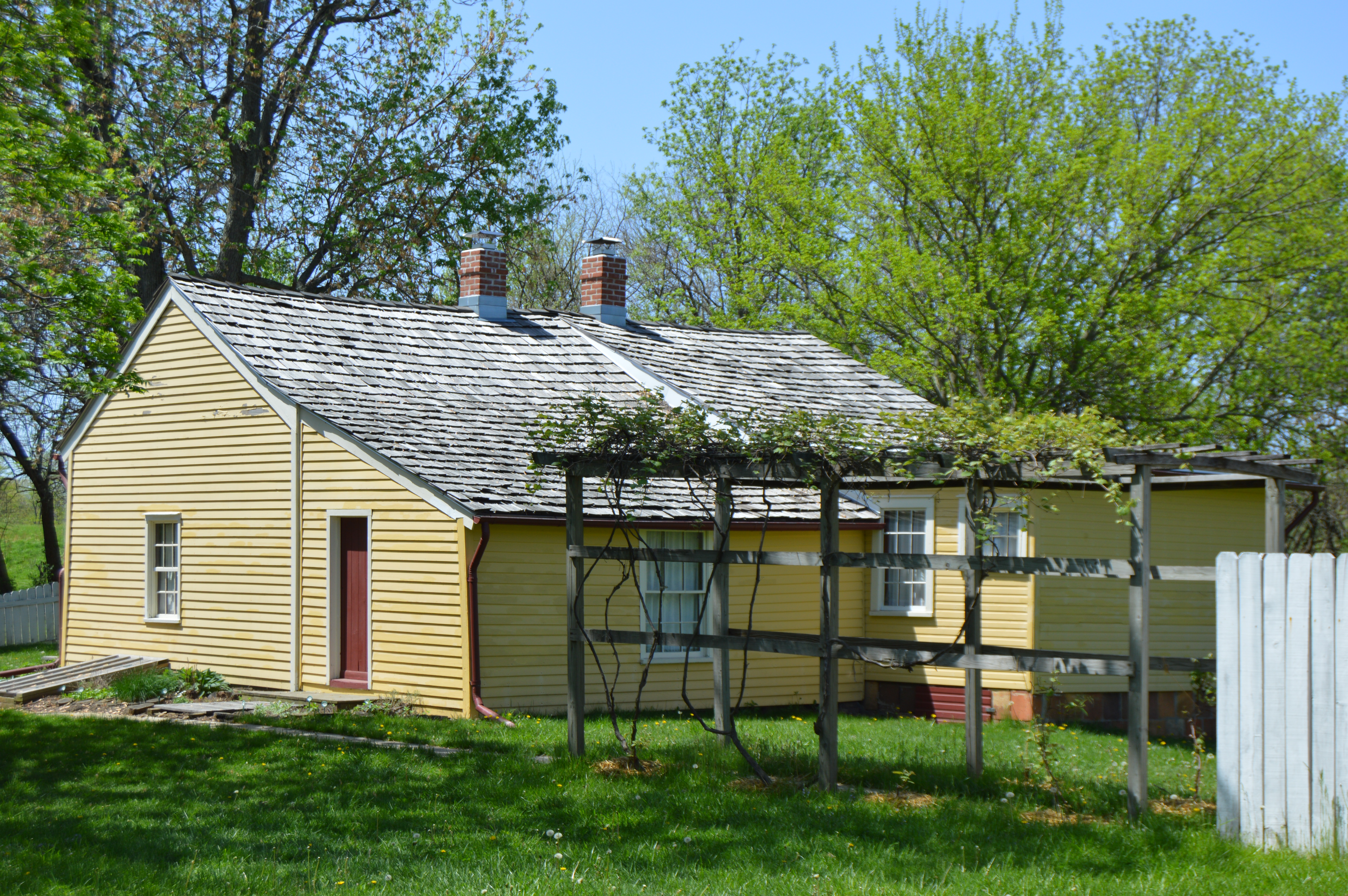

- Location within Illinois Location within the United States
- Location: 1495 Brozio Ln., Decatur, Illinois
- Coordinates: 39°47′47″N 89°0′39″W
- Area: 1.4 acres (0.57 ha)
- NRHP reference No.: 96000858
- Added to NRHP: August 1, 1996

The Trobaugh-Good House is a historic house located at 1495 Brozio Lane in the Rock Springs Center for Environmental Discovery southwest of Decatur, Illinois. The house was built c. 1847–53 as part of the Ward Settlement, one of the first communities in the area which became Macon County; it is one of the few buildings from the settlement which still survives. The settlement was formed by migrants from the Upland South; Joseph M. Trobaugh, who first owned the house, was one of the later arrivals from the region. The house was originally a one-room log pen house, a typical construction style among the migrants. As larger houses became more popular in the area in the 1850s, the house gained two additions. The first addition added a lean-to kitchen in back of the house, while the second was a saddlebag extension, a common vernacular addition that gave the house a parlor.

The house was added to the National Register of Historic Places on August 1, 1996.
