= Illinois High School Boys Basketball Championship =

American high school basketball tournament

The Illinois High School Boys Basketball Championship is a single elimination tournament held each spring in the United States. It is organized by the Illinois High School Association (IHSA).

In 1939, H. V. Porter of the IHSA coined the term "March Madness"

From 1908 to 1971, it was a single tournament contested by nearly all high schools in Illinois. In 1972, the tournament was divided into two divisions based on school size, (A and AA), each producing a separate champion. In 2008, the tournament was divided into four separate divisions (1A, 2A, 3A, and 4A being the larger schools). The Illinois High School Basketball Championship was the first tournament to be called 'March Madness'. The term was first used about the Illinois tournament in 1939, decades before it was used about NCAA basketball tournament.

== Advancement ==
Under the current four class system, teams are assigned to a class, based on the student population, with adjustments made for single gender schools, and for schools which are not four year high schools. Within the class, schools are geographically assigned to a regional, which is, in turn assigned to a sectional which, finally, is assigned to a super-sectional. Regional tournaments are generally between four and eight teams, depending on the number of teams in a geographic area in a particular class. There are four regional tournaments within each sectional and two sectionals within each super-sectional. Each tournament is single elimination.

Within the regional, coaches seed the teams. The winners of the four regional tournaments then meet in a single elimination sectional tournament. The teams are not re-seeded after regional play, and the winners of the regional tournament are randomly assigned, in advance, to play the winner of one of the other regionals in the sectional semifinals.

For example, in 2011, in the Class 2A Casey Sectional, there were four regionals: Flora, Monticello, St. Joseph and Robinson. Three of these regionals consisted of five teams and one of six. Before the playoffs began, the IHSA assigned the winner of the Flora Regional (which ended up being Teutopolis) to play the winner of the Monticello Regional (Champaign St. Thomas). The winners of the St. Joseph and Robinson regionals played in the other regional semifinal, with the winners of the two semifinals met in the sectional championship.

The winner of the sectional tournament then faces the winner of another (geographically close) sectional champion for the super-sectional championship. This winner advances to the state tournament.

The state tournament in each class is composed of the four super-sectional winners, and are randomly assigned to play each other in the semifinal round. The winners of the semifinal round compete for the state championship the next evening, while the semifinal losers compete for third place the next day. The state semifinals are generally held on a Friday, with the championship and third place games held on Saturday. Classes 1A and 2A share the same weekend, while 3A and 4A compete the weekend after that.

Under the current four class system, each class has four super sectional games, and thus 8 sectionals. Each sectional has four regionals, giving each class 32 regional tournaments.

The format in the two class system (1972–2007) was similar. In the two class system, each class had 8 super-sectional games, and thus 16 sectionals and 64 regionals. The winners of the 8 super-sectional games advanced to the state tournament. On the Friday of the state tournament, the 8 winners were randomly assigned to play each other in a quarterfinal game. The winners advanced to the semifinals, which were played on the next day. The semifinal losers played for third place in the early evening, while the semifinal winners contested the state championship in the evening. Class A would play one weekend, and Class AA the next weekend.

Prior to 1972, when there was only one tournament for all schools to compete in, there were a variety of formats in use.

The IHSA Girls Basketball tournament is organized in exactly the same way as the boys' tournament; however, the girls' tournament begins two weeks before the boys' tournament.

== Title game results ==
List of Illinois High School Boys Basketball Title Games
Season	Class	Champion	Runner-up	Score	Note
1907-08		Peoria	Rock Island	48-29	
1908-09		Hinsdale Twp.	Washington Community	18-13	
1909-10		Bloomington	Rock Island	32-25	
1910-11		Rockford	Mt. Carroll	60-15	
1911-12		Batavia	Galesburg	28-25	
1912-13		Galesburg	Peoria (Manual)	37-36	
1913-14		Hillsboro	Freeport	42-19	
1914-15		Freeport	Springfield	27-11	
1915-16		Bloomington	Robinson	25-17	
1916-17		Springfield	Belvidere	32-11	
1917-18		Centralia	Normal (University)	35-29	
1918-19		Rockford	Springfield	39-20	
1919-20		Mt. Vernon	Canton	18-14	
1920-21		Marion	Rockford	24-23	
1921-22		Centralia	Atwood	24-16	
1922-23		Villa Grove	Rockford	32-29	
1923-24		Elgin	Athens	28-17	H.V. Porter was the coach of the Athens team. He would later go to work for the IHSA, and compose the poem March Madness.
1924-25		Elgin	Champaign (Central)	25-17	
1925-26		Freeport	Canton	24-13	
1926-27		Mt. Carmel	Peoria	24-18	
1927-28		Canton	Aurora (West Aurora)	18-9	
1928-29		Johnston City	Champaign (Central)	30-21	
1929-30		Peoria (Manual)	Bloomington	38-25	
1930-31		Decatur	Galesburg	30-26	
1931-32		Morton	Canton	30-16	
1932-33		Thornton	Springfield	14-13	
1933-34		Quincy	Thornton	39-27	
1934-35		Springfield	Thornton	24-19	
1935-36		Decatur	Danville	26-22	
1936-37		Joliet Twp.	Decatur	40-20	
1937-38		Dundee	Reed-Custer	36-29	
1938-39		Rockford	Paris	53-44	
1939-40		Granite City	Herrin	24-22	
1940-41		Morton	Urbana	32-31	
1941-42		Centralia	Paris	35-33	
1942-43		Paris	Moline	46-37	
1943-44		Taylorville	Elgin	56-33	
1944-45		Decatur	Champaign (Central)	62-54	
1945-46		Champaign (Central)	Centralia	54-48	
1946-47		Paris	Champaign (Central)	58-37	
1947-48		Pinckneyville	Rockford East	65-39	
1948-49		Mt. Vernon	Hillsboro	45-39	
1949-50		Mt. Vernon	Danville	85-61	
1950-51		Freeport	Moline	71-51	
1951-52		Alden-Hebron	Quincy	64-59	OT. With a student population of 98, Alden-Hebron was the smallest school to win the state title in the one-class era
1952-53		Lyons Twp.	Peoria	72-60	
1953-54		Mt. Vernon	Chicago (DuSable)	76-70	
1954-55		Rockford (West)	Elgin	61-59	
1955-56		Rockford (West)	Edwardsville	67-65	
1956-57		Herrin	Collinsville	45-42	
1957-58		Chicago (Marshall)	Rock Falls	70-64	Marshall was the first champion from Chicago.
1958-59		Springfield	Aurora (West Aurora)	60-52	
1959-60		Chicago (Marshall)	Bridgeport	79-55	
1960-61		Collinsville	Thornton	84-50	
1961-62		Decatur	George Washington Carver Area	49-48	
1962-63		George Washington Carver Area	Centralia	53-52	
1963-64		Pekin	Cobden	50-45	
1964-65		Collinsville	Quincy	55-52	
1965-66		Thornton	Galesburg	74-60	
1966-67		Pekin	Carbondale	75-59	
1967-68		Evanston Twp.	Galesburg	70-51	
1968-69		Maywood (Proviso East)	Peoria (Spalding)	58-51	
1969-70		Lyons Twp.	East Moline (United)	71-52	
1970-71		Thornridge	Oak Lawn Community	52-50	
1971-72	A	Lawrenceville	Meridian (Mounds)	63-57	
1971-72	AA	Thornridge	Quincy	104-69	
1972-73	A	Ridgway	Kaneland	54-51	
1972-73	AA	Chicago (Hirsh)	New Trier East	65-51	
1973-74	A	Lawrenceville	Marquette (Ottawa)	54-53	
1973-74	AA	Maywood (Proviso East)	Bloom	61-56	
1974-75	A	Venice	Timothy Christian	65-46	
1974-75	AA	Chicago (Phillips)	Bloom	76-48	
1975-76	A	Mt. Pulaski	Rova	59-58	
1975-76	AA	Chicago (Morgan Park)	Aurora (West Aurora)	45-44	
1976-77	A	Madison	Aurora (Central Catholic)	71-55	
1976-77	AA	Peoria	Lanphier	72-62	
1977-78	A	Nashville	Havana	54-38	
1977-78	AA	Lockport Central	St. Joseph	64-47	
1978-79	A	New Lenox (Providence Catholic)	Havana	46-33	Five years after the Chicago Catholic League joins the IHSA, Providence Catholic becomes the first CCL member (and first private/Catholic school overall) to win a state title.
1978-79	AA	Maine South	Quincy	83-67	
1979-80	A	Luther South	Bergan	56-51	
1979-80	AA	Chicago (Manley)	Effingham	69-61	
1980-81	A	Madison	Dunlap	58-47	
1980-81	AA	Quincy	Maywood (Proviso East)	68-39	
1981-82	A	Lawrenceville	Monmouth	67-53	
1981-82	AA	East St. Louis (Lincoln)	Chicago (Mendel)	56-50	
1982-83	A	Lawrenceville	Flanagan	44-39	
1982-83	AA	Lanphier	Peoria	57-53	
1983-84	A	McLeansboro	Mt. Pulaski	57-50	
1983-84	AA	Chicago (Simeon)	Evanston Twp.	53-47	
1984-85	A	Chicago (Providence St. Mel)	Chrisman	95-63	
1984-85	AA	Chicago (Mt. Caramel)	Lanphier	46-44	2OT
1985-86	A	Teutopolis	Ohio	82-45	The Teutopolis Lady Shoes also won the girls title in 1986, and Teutopolis became the first Illinois school to win boys and girls titles in the same year.
1985-86	AA	Chicago (King)	Rich Central	47-40	
1986-87	A	Venice	Okawville	56-54	
1986-87	AA	East St. Louis (Lincoln)	Chicago (King)	79-62	
1987-88	A	Pana	Pinckneyville	62-58	
1987-88	AA	East St. Louis (Lincoln)	Chicago (St. Francis de Sales)	60-52	
1988-89	A	Carlyle	Rock Island (Alleman)	65-56	
1988-89	AA	East St. Louis (Lincoln)	Peoria	59-57	3OT
1989-90	A	Trenton (Wesclin)	Fairbury (Prairie Central)	83-78	2OT
1989-90	AA	Chicago (King)	Chicago (Gordon Tech)	65-55	
1990-91	A	Pittsfield	Seneca	45-35	
1990-91	AA	Maywood (Proviso East)	Peoria (Manual)	68-61	
1991-92	A	Findlay	Normal (University)	61-45	Even though Findlay was listed with a student population of 98 on television, the actual 9-12 enrollment was 75, making Findlay the smallest school to ever win the championship. The 98 mentioned was Grades 7-12, which were contained in the same building.
1991-92	AA	Maywood (Proviso East)	Richwoods	42-31	
1992-93	A	Staunton	Hales Franciscan	66-62	
1992-93	AA	King (Chicago)	Guilford	79-42	
1993-94	A	Pinckneyville	Eureka	67-65	
1993-94	AA	Peoria (Manual)	Carbondale	61-60	
1994-95	A	Normal (University)	Aurora Christian	56-54	
1994-95	AA	Peoria (Manual)	Thornton	65-53	
1995-96	A	Shelbyville	Breese (Mater Dei)	58-45	
1995-96	AA	Peoria (Manual)	Thornton	57-51	
1996-97	A	Warsaw	Hall	92-85	2OT
1996-97	AA	Peoria (Manual)	Aurora (West Aurora)	47-43	
1997-98	A	Nauvoo-Colusa	Hall	45-39	
1997-98	AA	Chicago (Whitney Young)	Galesburg	61-56	
1998-99	A	Rock Falls	Waterloo (Gibault Catholic)	45-43	
1998-99	AA	St. Joseph	Warren Twp.	61-51	
1999–2000	A	Pleasant Plains	Teutopolis	56-43	
1999–2000	AA	Aurora (West Aurora)	Chicago (Westinghouse)	60-57	
2000-01	A	Pinckneyville	Pana	77-50	
2000-01	AA	Schaumburg	Thornwood	66-54	
2001-02	A	Pleasant Plains	Herrin	50-47	OT
2001-02	AA	Chicago (Westinghouse)	Lanphier	76-72	
2002-03	A	Hales Franciscan	Mt. Carroll	58-53	
2002-03	AA	Peoria	Thornwood	45-43	
2003-04	A	Chicago (Leo)	Winnebago	65-57	
2003-04	AA	Peoria	Homewood-Flossmoor	53-47	
2004-05	A	~~Hales Franciscan~~	Winnebago	78-62	In November 2005, the IHSA suspended Hales Franciscan after learning its Illinois State Board of Education recognition had lapsed since June 2003. In January 2006, the IHSA ruled that the school forfeit every athletic contest played between June 10, 2003 and December 1, 2005, including the 2005 title, and ordered the school to return the championship trophy.
2004-05	AA	Glenbrook North	Carbondale	63-51	
2005-06	A	Seneca	Illinois Valley Central	47-44	
2005-06	AA	Chicago (Simeon)	Richwoods	31-29	OT
2006-07	A	Maroa-Forsyth	Chicago (North Lawndale Charter)	59-56	
2006-07	AA	Chicago (Simeon)	O'Fallon Twp.	77-54	
2007-08	1A	St. Anne	Nokomis	67-61	
2007-08	2A	Chicago (North Lawndale Charter)	Peoria (Manual)	56-42	
2007-08	3A	Chicago (Marshall)	Chicago (Simeon)	69-61	
2007-08	4A	Oak Lawn (Richards)	Zion-Benton Twp.	67-63	
2008-09	1A	Meridian (Macon)	Woodlawn	63-53	
2008-09	2A	Seton Academy	Massac County	83-63	
2008-09	3A	Champaign (Centennial)	Oswego	61-59	
2008-09	4A	Chicago (Whitney Young)	Waukegan	69-66	
2009-10	1A	(Catlin (Salt Fork) Coop	Sesser-Valier	55-42	
2009-10	2A	Robinson	Peoria (Manual)	76-68	OT
2009-10	3A	Hillcrest	Richwoods	58-55	
2009-10	4A	Chicago (Simeon)	Chicago (Whitney Young)	51-36	
2010-11	1A	Newark	Winchester	57-35	
2010-11	2A	Hales Franciscan	Murphysboro	61-47	
2010-11	3A	Rock Island	Centralia	50-40	2OT
2010-11	4A	Chicago (Simeon)	Warren Township	48-39	
2011-12	1A	Woodlawn	Carrollton	48-45	
2011-12	2A	Breese (Central)	Normal (University)	53-47	
2011-12	3A	Peoria	North Chicago	72-64	
2011-12	4A	Chicago (Simeon)	Maywood (Proviso East)	50-48	
2012-13	1A	Mason City (Illini Central)	Madison	55-44	
2012-13	2A	Harrisburg	South Holland (Seton Academy)	50-44	
2012-13	3A	Chicago (Morgan Park)	Cahokia	63-48	
2012-13	4A	Chicago (Simeon)	Stevenson	58-40	
2013-14	1A	Mooseheart	Heyworth	63-47	
2013-14	2A	Bloomington (Central Catholic)	Nashville	76-62	
2013-14	3A	Chicago (Morgan Park)	Lincoln	59-49	
2013-14	4A	Chicago (Whitney Young)	Lisle (Benet Academy)	46-44	
2014-15	1A	Brimfield	Meridian	56-52	
2014-15	2A	Uplift	St. Teresa	53-47	
2014-15	3A	St. Joseph	Belleville (Althoff Catholic)	67-63	
2014-15	4A	Stevenson	Normal	57-40	
2015-16	1A	Le Roy	Chicago (Leo)	38-35	
2015-16	2A	St. Joseph	Rockridge	61-43	
2015-16	3A	Belleville (Althoff Catholic)	New Lenox (Lincoln-Way West)	62-37	
2015-16	4A	Chicago (Curie)	Lisle (Benet Academy)	65-59	
2016-17	1A	Effingham (St. Anthony)	Okawville	49-46	OT
2016-17	2A	Chicago (Orr)	Mt. Carmel	59-39	
2016-17	3A	Chicago (Morgan Park)	Oak Park (Fenwick)	69-67	OT
2016-17	4A	Chicago (Whitney Young)	Chicago (Simeon)	60-50	OT
2017-18	1A	Okawville	Annawan	59-48	
2017-18	2A	Chicago (Orr)	Winnebago	76-49	
2017-18	3A	Chicago (Morgan Park)	Springfield (Southeast)	71-56	
2017-18	4A	Belleville (West)	Chicago (Whitney Young)	60-56	OT
2018-19	1A	Chicago (Providence St. Mel)	Cissna Park	52-29	
2018-19	2A	Chicago (Orr)	Nashville	50-36	
2018-19	3A	East St. Louis	Chicago (Bogan)	68-63	OT
2018-19	4A	Belleville (West)	Evanston Twp.	71-59	
2019-20	CANCELLED due to the COVID-19 pandemic				
2020-21	CANCELLED due to the COVID-19 pandemic				
2021-22	1A	Yorkville School	Liberty	54-41	
2021-22	2A	Nashville	Monticello	32-31	
2021-22	3A	Springfield (Sacred Heart-Griffin)	Metamora	53-50	
2021-22	4A	Glen Ellyn (Glenbard West)	Chicago (Whitney Young)	56-34	
2022-23	1A	Waterloo (Gibault Catholic)	Scales Mound	65-45	
2022-23	2A	Chicago (DePaul College Prep)	Bloomington (Central Catholic)	65-41	
2022-23	3A	Metamora	Chicago (Simeon)	46-42	
2022-23	4A	Moline	Lisle (Benet Academy)	59-42	
2023-24	1A	Winchester	Meridian (Mounds)	62-43	
2023-24	2A	Chicago (Phillips)	Benton	54-47	
2023-24	3A	Chicago (DePaul College Prep)	Mt. Carmel	49-41	
2023-24	4A	Homewood-Flossmoor	Normal	60-48	
2024-25	1A	Chicago (C. Hope Academy)	Lanark (Eastland)	71-38	
2024-25	2A	Chicago (Dyett)	Belleville (Althoff Catholic)	52-41	
2024-25	3A	Chicago (DePaul College Prep)	Chicago (Brother Rice)	55-52	
2024-25	4A	Lisle (Benet Academy)	Warren Township	55-54	
2025-26	1A	Chicago (Marshall)	Goreville	52-44	
2025-26	2A	Peoria (Manual)	Quincy (Notre Dame)	60-55	
2025-26	3A	Deerfield	Chicago (Leo)	52-46	
2025-26	4A	Chicago (Marist)	Lisle (Benet Academy)	44-28	

== Sites ==
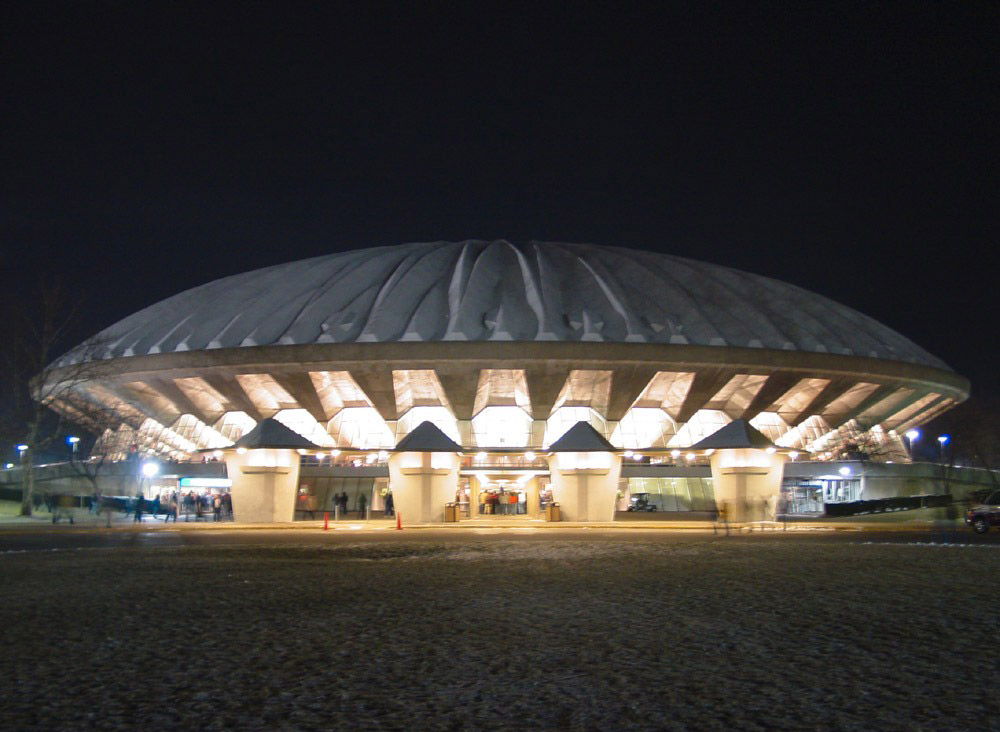
State Farm Center (formerly Assembly Hall)

The tournament was originally organized only with the permission of the IHSA, but after one year was taken over by the Association. While the tournament spent the first 11 years rotating to various sites around the state, it spent the next 77 years playing on the campus of the University of Illinois at Urbana–Champaign (UIUC). From 1996-2019, it moved to Bradley University's Carver Arena in Peoria. The 2020 tournament was cancelled due to the COVID-19 pandemic. On June 15, 2020, the IHSA announced the tournament would move back to UIUC's State Farm Center, but due the cancellation of the 2021 tournament (also because of COVID-19), that return would be delayed until 2022.

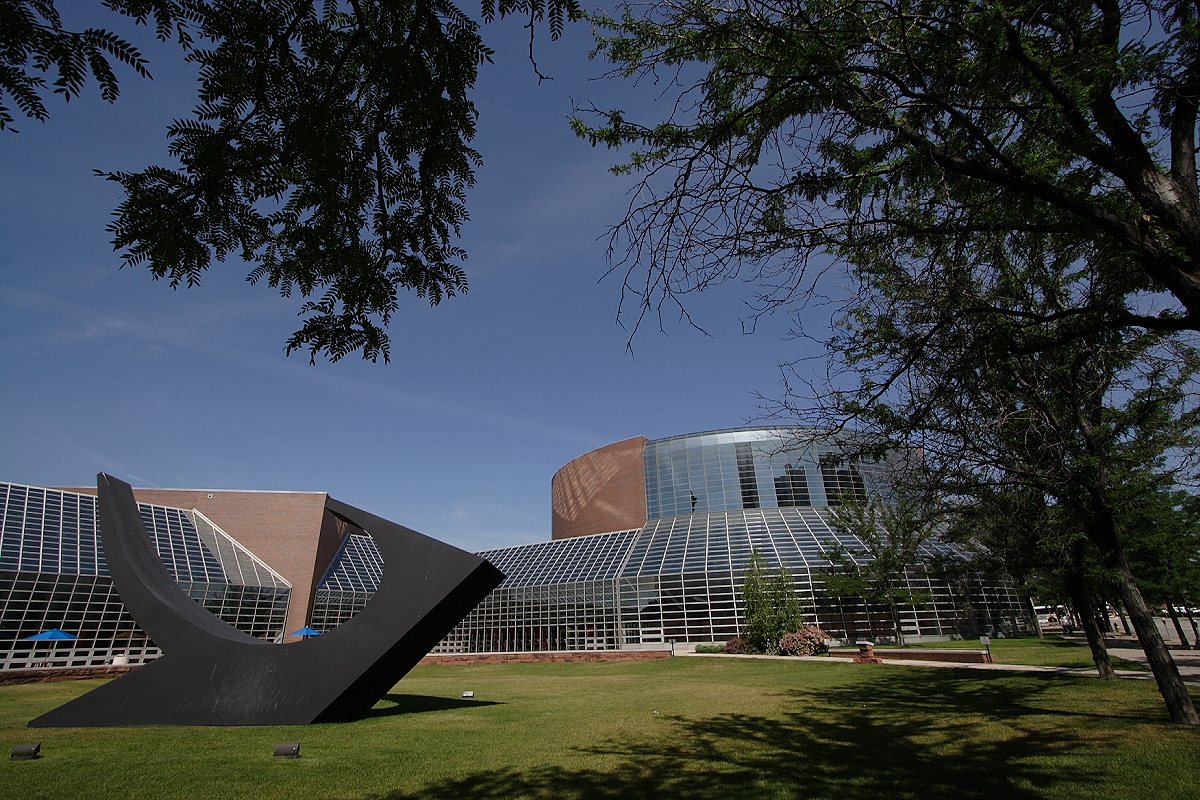
Peoria Civic Center

Single Tournament

- 1908: Oak Park YMCA
- 1909-1910: Bloomington YMCA
- 1911: Hewitt Gym at Bradley University
- 1912: Decatur YMCA
- 1913: Hewitt Gym at Bradley University
- 1914: Decatur YMCA
- 1915-1917: Millikin University
- 1918: Springfield High School
- 1919-1925: Kenney Gym at UIUC
- 1926-1962: Huff Gym at UIUC
- 1963-1971: State Farm Center at UIUC

Class A & AA Tournaments

- 1972-1995: State Farm Center at UIUC
- 1996–2007: Peoria Civic Center

Class 1A, 2A, 3A & 4A Tournaments

- 2008–2019: Peoria Civic Center
- 2020–2021: Cancelled (due to the COVID-19 pandemic)
- 2022-present: State Farm Center at UIUC

== Additional events ==
=== The Happening ===
In 1992, the IHSA added a three-point contest and a slam dunk contest (collectively called "The Happening") to coincide with the boys basketball state series. The state level of each contest is held on the Thursday evening before their respective class' state semifinals (quarterfinals before 2008), with each class crowning a champion in each contest on the Saturday of their state championship game. After the Class 3A and 4A champions have been determined, there is a final "King of the Hill" contest among the four class champion to crown the overall champion.

The slam dunk contest has no preliminaries prior to the Thursday competition of the week of the state finals. Players are nominated by the coaches of their regional or sectional tournament. Those willing to participate advance automatically to the state preliminaries.

The three point contest starts at the beginning of the regional tournaments. Each team may select up to 4 players to compete, with a total of four players advancing to the next level of competition. As teams advance through regional and sectional, the winning individuals advance, irrespective of their team's success.

March Madness Experience logo

=== March Madness Experience ===
Since 1996, in addition to the on court activities, the IHSA has set up an interactive event at the Peoria Civic Center called the March Madness Experience. Set up in the 100,000-square-foot (9,300 m^{2}) Exhibit Hall, the "Experience" includes interactive games and skill challenges for fans to participate in. Big screen televisions allow fans to watch the current game being played on the court, and radio and television broadcasts originate from the floor. The "Experience" opens on the Thursday of each week of the State Championship Tournament, and remains open throughout the tournament.

=== Wheelchair Basketball ===
Starting in 2004, the first weekend of the State Championship Tournament also hosts the state high school championship for wheelchair basketball. The tournament is a round robin tournament, and is composed of teams of high school students, though the teams are not necessarily affiliated with a particular school.

=== Century of Memories ===
100th Anniversary logo

The IHSA celebrated 100 years of the IHSA State Tournament in the 2006-07 season. A list of "100 Legends of the IHSA Boys Basketball Tournament" was assembled. Several of the living members of that team made appearances at select games across the state, and signed a "Ball of Fame" which was subsequently raffled off at the state tournament. Commemorative books and videos were available. Among the notable members of the "Legends" team were Kenny Battle, Lou Boudreau, Jim Brewer, Quinn Buckner, Landon "Sonny" Cox, Bruce Douglas, Dwight "Dike" Eddleman, LaPhonso Ellis, Melvin Ely, Michael Finley, C. J. Kupec, Marcus Liberty, Shaun Livingston, Cuonzo Martin, Johnny Orr, Andy Phillip, Quentin Richardson, Dave Robisch, Cazzie Russell, Jon Scheyer, Jack Sikma, Isiah Thomas, Frank Williams, and George Wilson.

== See also ==
- Illinois High School Association
- March Madness (disambiguation)
- Peoria, Illinois
- Will it play in Peoria?—the IHSA often uses "Playing in Peoria" as a part of its advertising for the state championship
