= 100 Legends of the IHSA Boys Basketball Tournament =

Legends of the IHSA Boys Basketball Tournament

The Illinois High School Association (IHSA) celebrated 100 years of the IHSA State Tournament in the 2006–07 season. A list of "100 Legends of the IHSA Boys Basketball Tournament" was assembled on December 14, 2005. Throughout the state, 281 individuals were nominated and were chosen by geographic region and tournament era. The team of 100 Legends was selected by fans throughout the state with online voting. Several of the living members of that team made appearances at select games across the state, and signed a "Ball of Fame" which was subsequently raffled off at the state tournament. The proceeds from the Ball of Fame raffle went to the Illinois School Activities Foundation, which annually awards scholarships to high school students from member schools. Commemorative books and videos were available.

The following list contains the 100 members, their school, community and whether they were a player or coach.

== Legends ==
Name	High school	City	Player/Coach
Joe Allen	Carver High School	Chicago	Player
Jeff Baker	Maine South High School	Park Ridge	Player
Kenny Battle	Aurora West High School	Aurora	Player
Boyd Batts	Thornridge High School	Dolton	Player
Ted Beach	Champaign High School	Champaign	Player
Dusty Bensko	Pleasant Plains High School	Pleasant Plains	Player
Brad Bickett	Ohio High School; Bureau Valley High School	Ohio; Manlius	Player; Coach
Don Blanken	Dundee High School	Dundee	Player
Lou Boudreau	Thornton Township High School	Harvey	Player
Jamie Brandon	King High School	Chicago	Player
Jim Brewer	Proviso East High School	Maywood	Player
Bruce Brothers	Quincy High School	Quincy	Player
Charlie Brown	DuSable High School	Chicago	Player
Quinn Buckner	Thornridge High School	Dolton	Player
Chuck Buescher	Peoria High School	Peoria	Coach
Jack Burmaster	Elgin High School; Evanston Township High School	Elgin; Evanston	Player; Coach
Ed Butkovich	Canton High School; Mt. Pulaski High School	Canton; Mt. Pulaski	Player; Coach
Ted Caiazza	Lyons Township High School	LaGrange	Player
Andy Calmes	Warrensburg-Latham High School	Warrensburg	Player
Cliff Cameron	Pleasant Plains High School	Pleasant Plains	Coach
Francis Clements	Ottawa Township High School	Ottawa	Player
Jeff Clements	Mt. Pulaski High School	Mt. Pulaski	Player
Harry Combes	Champaign High School	Champaign	Player
Lynch Conway	Peoria High School	Peoria	Player
Dick Corn	Benton High School; Pinckneyville High School	Benton; Pinckneyville	Player; Coach
Landon "Sonny" Cox	King High School	Chicago	Coach
Bruce Douglas	Quincy High School	Quincy	Player
Walter Downing	Providence Catholic High School	New Lenox	Player
Mike Duff	Eldorado High School	Eldorado	Player
Dwight "Dike" Eddleman	Centralia High School	Centralia	Player
LaPhonso Ellis	Lincoln High School	East St. Louis	Player
Melvin Ely	Thornton Township High School	Harvey	Player
Ernie Eveland	Waterman High School; Paris High School	Waterman; Paris	Coach
Ron Felling	Lawrenceville High School	Lawrenceville	Coach
Michael Finley	Proviso East High School	Maywood	Player
Virgil Fletcher	Collinsville High School	Collinsville	Coach
Jim Flynn	Illinois High School Association	Bloomington	Administrator
Larry Graham	Madison High School	Madison	Player
Bob Grant	Pekin High School	Pekin	Player
Lowell Hamilton	Providence St. Mel High School	Chicago	Player
Dawson "Dawdy" Hawkins	Peoria High School; Pekin High School	Peoria; Pekin	Coach
Bill Heisler	Warsaw High School	Warsaw	Player
Max Hooper	Mt. Vernon High School	Mt. Vernon	Player
Walt Hoult	Chrisman High School	Chrisman	Player
Cal Hubbard	University High School	Normal	Player
Shawn Jeppson	Hall High School	Spring Valley	Player
Dave Johnson	ROVA High School	Oneida	Player
Paul Judson	Hebron High School	Hebron	Player
Phil Judson	Hebron High School	Hebron	Player
Gordon Kerkman	Aurora West High School	Aurora	Coach
Gay Kintner	Decatur High School	Decatur	Coach
Tom Kleinschmidt	Gordon Tech High School	Chicago	Player
Jerry Kuemmerle	Schlarman High School	Danville	Player
C.J. Kupec	Oak Lawn Community High School	Oak Lawn	Player
Jerry Leggett	Rich Central High School; Quincy High School	Olympia Fields; Quincy	Coach
Bennie Lewis	Lincoln High School; Senior High School	East St. Louis	Coach
Marcus Liberty	King High School	Chicago	Player
Richard Liitt	Rock Island High School	Rock Island	Player
Jack Lipe	Decatur High School; Thornton High School	Decatur; Harvey	Player; Coach
Shaun Livingston	Peoria High School	Peoria	Player
Paxton Lumpkin	DuSable High School	Chicago	Player
Cuonzo Martin	Lincoln High School	East St. Louis	Player
Sergio McClain	Manual High School	Peoria	Player
Wayne McClain	Manual High School	Peoria	Coach
John McDougal	Salem High School; Lutheran High School	Salem; Rockford	Player; Coach
Tom Michael	Carlyle High School	Carlyle	Player
Fred Miller	Pekin High School	Pekin	Player
Doug Mills	Elgin High School; Joliet Township High School	Elgin; Joliet	Player; Coach
Dale Minick	Decatur High School	Decatur	Player
Johnny Orr	Taylorville High School	Taylorville	Player
Mark Pancratz	Schaumburg High School	Schaumburg	Player
Mark Peterman	Canton High School; Springfield High School	Canton; Springfield	Coach
Andy Phillip	Granite City High School	Granite City	Player
Gene Pingatore	St. Joseph High School	Westchester	Coach
Roger Powell	Joliet Central High School	Joliet	Player
Bogie Redmon	Collinsville High School	Collinsville	Player
Carl Richard	Richards High School	Oak Lawn	Player
Quentin Richardson	Young High School	Chicago	Player
Dave Robisch	Springfield High School	Springfield	Player
Chuck Rolinski	Toluca High School	Toluca	Player
Cazzie Russell	Carver High School	Chicago	Player
Herb Scheffler	Springfield High School	Springfield	Coach
Jon Scheyer	Glenbrook North High School	Northbrook	Player
Bill Schulz	Hebron High School	Hebron	Player
Jay Shidler	Lawrenceville High School	Lawrenceville	Player
Jack Sikma	St. Anne High School	St. Anne	Player
Marty Simmons	Lawrenceville High School	Lawrenceville	Player
Dolph Stanley	Equality High School; Mt. Pulaski High School; Taylorville High School; Auburn High School; Boylan Catholic High School; Keith High School	Equality; Mt. Pulaski; Taylorville; Rockford; Rockford; Rockford	Coach
Lyndon Swanson	Watseka High School	Watseka	Player
John Thiel	Galesburg High School	Galesburg	Coach
Isiah Thomas	St. Joseph High School	Westchester	Player
Merrill "Duster" Thomas	Pinckneyville High School	Pinckneyville	Player
Gary Tidwell	Pana High School; Prairie Central High School	Pana; Fairbury	Coach
Arthur Trout	Centralia High School	Centralia	Coach
Dick Van Scyoc	Washington High School; Manual High School	Washington; Peoria	Coach
Bob Van Vooren	Moline High School	Moline	Player
Brian Vance	Rock Falls High School	Rock Falls	Player
John Wessels	West High School	Rockford	Player
Frank Williams	Manual High School	Peoria	Player
George Wilson	Marshall High School	Chicago	Player
Bob Zerrusen	Teutopolis High School	Teutopolis	Player
