= PPHS =

PPHS may refer to:

- Picnic Point High School, a school in Sydney, Australia
- Port Perry High School, a school in Port Perry, Ontario, Canada
- Pinellas Park High School, a school in Largo, Florida
- Pleasant Plains High School, a school in Pleasant Plains, Illinois
