= Dolph Stanley =

American basketball player and coach

- Dolph Stanley

Biographical details
- Born: January 23, 1905; Marion, Illinois, U.S.
- Died: July 9, 1990 (aged 85); Rockford, Illinois, U.S.

Coaching career (HC unless noted)
- 1933–1934: Equality HS
- 1934–1937: Mt. Pulaski HS
- 1938–1945: Taylorville HS
- 1945–1957: Beloit College
- 1960–1970: Rockford Auburn HS
- 1970–1980: Rockford Boylan HS
- 1984–1989: Rockford Keith HS

Head coaching record
- Overall: 943-370

Accomplishments and honors

Championships
- IHSA Boys Basketball Championship (1944); Midwest Conference Champions (1946, 1947, 1948, 1949, 1950, 1951)

Awards
- Beloit College Athletic Hall of Honor (1971); IBCA Hall of Fame (1973); NIC-10 Coach of the Year (1977); Chicago Tribune`s all-time Illinois high school coach (1990); 100 Legends of the IHSA Boys Basketball Tournament (2007); WBCA Hall of Fame (2009)

Dolph Stanley (January 23, 1905 – July 9, 1990) was an American basketball player and coach. Nicknamed the ”Silver Fox”, Stanley is best known for holding the "unbreakable" record of guiding five different Illinois High School Association (IHSA) schools into the state tournament. He gained national prominence by coaching Beloit College to a 238–57 basketball record from 1945 to 1957 while guiding them to an NIT berth and a final AP Rank of No. 16 in 1951. Collectively, Stanley coached six high school teams as well as Beloit College, compiling 943 total victories (705 high school, 238 college). He finished his career in 1989 at Keith Country Day School in Rockford.

== Early years ==
Stanley was born in Marion, Illinois, becoming a three-year letterman in basketball while attending Marion High School. Following high school, he attended Southern Illinois University and the University of Illinois. In 1933 Stanley became the head coach of Equality High School in Equality, Illinois. In just one year of coaching, he took the Cardinals to a third-place finish in 1934. Stanley left Equality after winning 94% of his games, finishing with a record of 36 wins and only 2 losses.

Stanley next took the reign of Mt. Pulaski High School and led them to a fourth-place finish in 1936. In his three years of coaching the Hilltoppers, Stanley coached teams produced 70 wins with only 18 losses. During his time at Mt. Pulaski, he married Laura Jane Dial on August 26, 1934 in Mt. Vernon, Illinois.

In 1938, he became the head coach of Taylorville High School. During his seven years at the helm, the Tornadoes won four regional titles, two sectional titles and, in 1944, Stanley directed them to a perfect 45–0 record. This was Stanley's only state championship team and the first undefeated titlist in Illinois history. That team included future Hall of Fame coach Johnny Orr and 1952 Olympic gold medalist Ron Bontemps. His final record at Taylorville was an astounding 196–42.

== Beloit College ==
The success Stanley had demonstrated caught the interest of Beloit College, where he became coach and athletic director in 1945. During his twelve years at Beloit, Stanley's teams won six consecutive Midwest Conference titles from 1946 to 1951. In 1957, he finished his career at Beloit with an overall record of 238 wins with only 57 losses.

The 1950–51 season provided some of the most memorable games in Midwest Conference history. The two most prominent events occurred when the Stanley's Buccaneers devastated Cornell (Iowa) 141–53 to establish a Beloit College Field House scoring record, and crushed Ray Meyer's DePaul team 94–60 to break the Chicago Stadium scoring record.

Stanley was very familiar with several starters on his Beloit teams. Examples include, Ron Bontemps, (class of '51), who went on to captain the 1952 Gold Medal Olympic team; Johnny Orr, (class of '49), who later coached at the University of Michigan and Iowa State; and John Erickson, (class of '49), who was the head coach at the University of Wisconsin, director of basketball operations for the Big 8 Conference, and served as the general manager for the Milwaukee Bucks.

== Later years ==
After leaving Beloit, Stanley became the athletic director at Drake University. That career was short-lived, as Stanley's desire to coach brought him back to the high school ranks of Illinois. Stanley became the head coach of Rockford Auburn High School in 1960. His tenure at Auburn was so well received that the gymnasium at the school was named the Dolph Stanley Gymnasium. For 10 seasons Stanley coached the Knights to four regional and three sectional titles, advancing to the state quarterfinals in 1963. Though his teams didn't make the finals of the IHSA tournament, Stanley's Auburn teams produced 176 wins to 78 losses.

In 1970, at the age of 65, Stanley retired from the public school setting and focused his coaching in the arena of private school, taking the reign at Boylan Catholic High School, also in Rockford. During his first year at Boylan, Stanley led the Titans to a state quarterfinal appearance. He remained at Boylan until 1980, winning an additional regional title in 1977 while totaling 137 wins. At Boylan, met his most difficulties, losing 130 games – nearly half of his high school total. Stanley finished his career at Rockford's Keith Country Day School. During his time at Keith, Stanley compiled a record of 90 wins and 43 losses. He retired in 1989.

Stanley died Monday July 9, 1990 at St. Anthony Medical Center in Rockford.

== Recognition ==
Of the six Illinois high school teams that Stanley coached, five qualified for the Illinois High School Association state quarterfinals. His 1944 Taylorville team won the state championship with a 45–0 record and featured Olympian Ron Bontemps and former Iowa State University coach Johnny Orr. It was the first undefeated champion in the state's history.

Stanley was inducted into the Illinois Basketball Coaches Association in 1973.

In 1977, he received the honor of being named the NIC-10 Coach of the Year.

Stanley was inducted into the Beloit College Athletic Hall of Honor in 1971.

Named Chicago Tribune`s all-time Illinois high school coach in 1990.

In 2007, the Illinois High School Association named Stanley one of the 100 Legends of the IHSA Boys Basketball Tournament.

Stanley was also inducted into the Wisconsin Basketball Coaches Association Hall of Fame posthumously in October 2009.

The gymnasium at Rockford Auburn as well as the basketball court in Taylorville High School's West Gymnasium are named in his honor.

== Head coaching record ==
School	Season	Record	Postseason
Equality HS	1933-34	36-2	3rd Place
Equality HS	1933-34	36-2	1 season

School	Season	Record	Postseason
Mt. Pulaski HS	1934-35	20-7	District Champions
Mt. Pulaski HS	1935-36	26-7	4th Place
Mt. Pulaski HS	1936-37	24-4	Regional Champions
Mt. Pulaski HS	1934-37	70-18	3 seasons

School	Season	Record	Postseason
Taylorville HS	1938-39	19-14	
Taylorville HS	1939-40	21-11	State Quarterfinals
Taylorville HS	1940-41	26-4	
Taylorville HS	1941-42	28-5	Regional Champions
Taylorville HS	1942-43	28-3	Regional Champions
Taylorville HS	1943-44	45-0	State Champions
Taylorville HS	1944-45	29-5	Regional Champions
Taylorville HS	1938-45	196-42	7 seasons

School	Season	Record	Postseason
Beloit College	1945-46	15-6	Conference champions
Beloit College	1946-47	22-5	Conference champions
Beloit College	1947-48	24-3	Conference champions
Beloit College	1948-49	29-4	Conference champions
Beloit College	1949-50	25-3	Conference champions
Beloit College	1950-51	24-3	Conference champions Final AP Rank 16
Beloit College	1951-52	17-5	
Beloit College	1952-53	16-4	
Beloit College	1953-54	19-3	
Beloit College	1954-55	22-4	
Beloit College	1955-56	14-9	
Beloit College	1956-57	17-6	
Beloit College	1945-57	238-57	12 seasons

School	Season	Record	Postseason
Rockford Auburn HS	1960-61	10-14	
Rockford Auburn HS	1961-62	13-13	Sectional Champions
Rockford Auburn HS	1962-63	28-3	State Quarterfinal
Rockford Auburn HS	1963-64	20-6	Sectional Champions
Rockford Auburn HS	1964-65	16-7	
Rockford Auburn HS	1965-66	21-5	
Rockford Auburn HS	1966-67	13-9	
Rockford Auburn HS	1967-68	18-9	Sectional Champions
Rockford Auburn HS	1968-69	15-8	
Rockford Auburn HS	1969-70	22-4	Regional Champions
Rockford Auburn HS	1960-70	176-78	10 seasons

School	Season	Record	Postseason
Rockford Boylan HS	1970-71	23-9	State Quarterfinals
Rockford Boylan HS	1971-72	19-7	
Rockford Boylan HS	1972-73	7-18	
Rockford Boylan HS	1973-74	12-13	
Rockford Boylan HS	1974-75	18-9	
Rockford Boylan HS	1975-76	15-12	
Rockford Boylan HS	1976-77	17-11	Regional Champions
Rockford Boylan HS	1977-78	15-11	
Rockford Boylan HS	1978-79	7-20	
Rockford Boylan HS	1979-80	4-20	
Rockford Boylan HS	1970-80	137-130	10 seasons

School	Season	Record	Postseason
Rockford Keith HS	1984-89	90-43	
Rockford Keith HS	1984-89	90-43	5 seasons
