= Jeff Baker (basketball) =

American basketball player

Personal information
- Born: 1961 (age 64–65) Park Ridge, Illinois
- Listed height: 6 ft 4 in (1.93 m)
- Listed weight: 175 lb (79 kg)

Career information
- High school: Maine South High School (Park Ridge, Illinois)
- College: TCU (1979–1983)
- Position: Guard
- Number: 22

Career highlights
- 100 Legends of the IHSA Boys Basketball Tournament

Jeff Baker (born 1961) was an American college basketball player for Texas Christian University in the early 1980s. A guard, Baker played in 99 games and score 774 points in his four seasons of varsity basketball. He averaged 3.3 rebounds and 7.8 points per game. During his senior season, the Horned Frogs would make the quarterfinals of the NIT, losing to Nebraska.

== High school ==
Baker was an outstanding high school basketball player at Maine South High School, where he led the Hawks to their only Illinois Class AA boys' championship in 1979 with a 31–1 record. In his four years of high school, Baker scored 2,512 points, placing him as the 32nd all-time leader in scoring in the IHSA. During his senior season, Baker averaged 28 points per game and in the state title game, versus undefeated Quincy, he scored 26 points and grabbed 10 rebounds in the 83–67 victory. In 2007, Baker was voted one of the "100 Legends of the IHSA Boys Basketball Tournament", recognizing his superior performance in his appearances in the tournament.

== College career ==
Baker enrolled at Texas Christian University in the fall of 1979. As a freshman, he would play in 22 of the team's 26 games, averaging 2.8 points and 1.2 rebounds per game on a team with a record of 7 wins and 19 losses. Baker's sophomore season included playing in all 29 of the Horned Frogs games, averaging 9.4 points and 3.9 rebounds per game on a team with an 11–18 record. During his junior season, Baker played in all 29 games with an average of 10.3 points and 3.9 rebounds per game on a team that improved to an overall record of 16 wins and 13 losses and a 4th place tie in the Southwest Conference. Baker finished his senior season on the a team that finished with 23 wins, the most since the 1951–52 season (24–4). During this season, Baker would average 7.4 points and 3.9 rebounds per game and the team would advance to the third round of the NIT.
