= Mounds, Illinois =

Mounds
- City
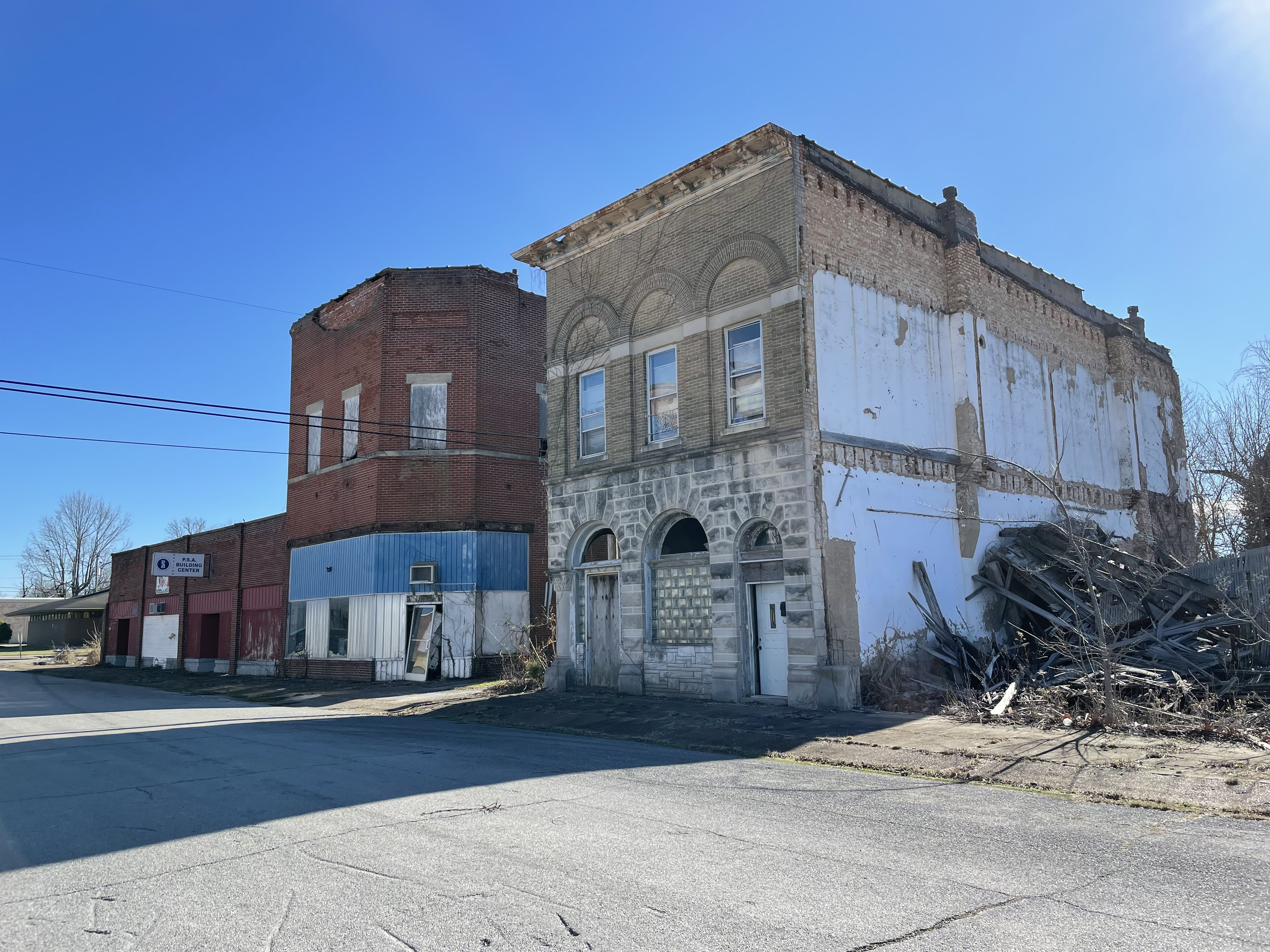
- Downtown Mounds in 2023

- Location of Mounds in Pulaski County, Illinois.

- Location of Illinois in the United States
- Coordinates: 37°6′53″N 89°11′57″W
- Country: United States
- State: Illinois
- County: Pulaski

Area
  - Total: 1.22 sq mi (3.15 km^{2})
  - Land: 1.21 sq mi (3.13 km^{2})
  - Water: 0.0077 sq mi (0.02 km^{2})
- Elevation: 328 ft (100 m)

Population (2020)
  - Total: 661
  - Density: 548/sq mi (211.4/km^{2})
- Time zone: UTC-6 (CST)
  - Summer (DST): UTC-5 (CDT)
- ZIP Code(s): 62964
- Area code: 618
- FIPS code: 17-50777
- GNIS feature ID: 2395117
- Wikimedia Commons: Mounds, Illinois

Mounds is a city in Pulaski County, Illinois, United States. The population was 661 in the 2020 census.

== History ==
The town was named for the prehistoric monumental earthwork mounds in the area.

== Geography ==
Mounds is located at 37°6′53″N 89°11′57″W (37.114838, -89.199030).

According to the 2010 census, Mounds has a total area of 1.219 square miles (3.16 km^{2}), of which 1.21 square miles (3.13 km^{2}) (or 99.26%) is land and 0.009 square miles (0.02 km^{2}) (or 0.74%) is water.

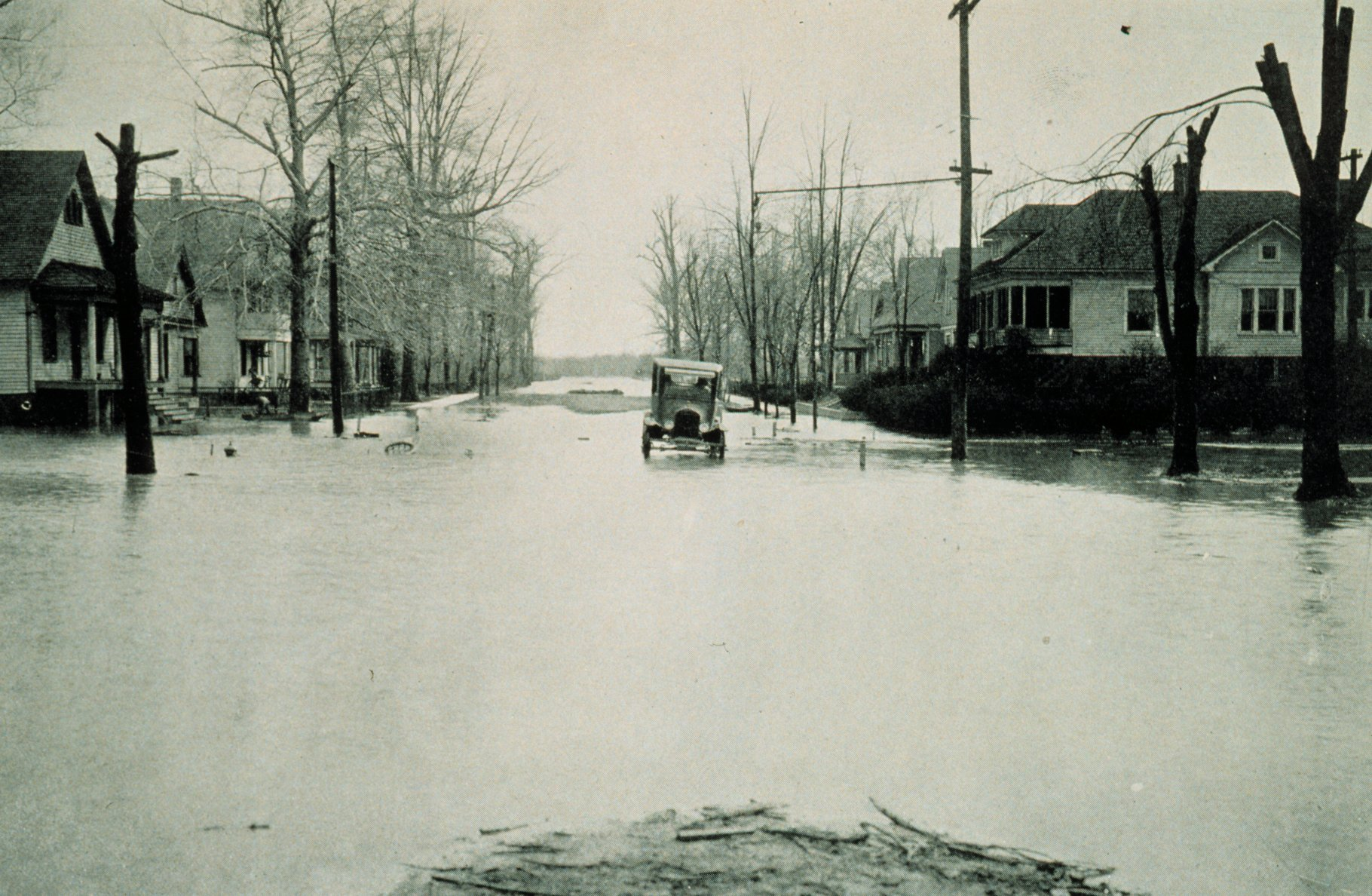
The 1927 flood in Mounds

== Demographics ==
Historical population
Census	Pop.	Note	%±
1900	854		—
1910	1,686		97.4%
1920	2,661		57.8%
1930	2,129		−20.0%
1940	2,144		0.7%
1950	2,001		−6.7%
1960	1,835		−8.3%
1970	1,718		−6.4%
1980	1,669		−2.9%
1990	1,407		−15.7%
2000	1,117		−20.6%
2010	810		−27.5%
2020	661		−18.4%
U.S. Decennial Census

=== Racial and ethnic composition ===
Mounds, Illinois – Racial and ethnic composition Note: the US Census treats Hispanic/Latino as an ethnic category. This table excludes Latinos from the racial categories and assigns them to a separate category. Hispanics/Latinos may be of any race.
Race / Ethnicity (NH = Non-Hispanic)	Pop 2000	Pop 2010	Pop 2020	% 2000	% 2010	% 2020
White alone (NH)	407	177	130	36.44%	21.85%	19.67%
Black or African American alone (NH)	669	585	502	59.89%	72.22%	75.95%
Native American or Alaska Native alone (NH)	2	6	3	0.18%	0.74%	0.45%
Asian alone (NH)	2	3	1	0.18%	0.37%	0.15%
Native Hawaiian or Pacific Islander alone (NH)	0	0	0	0.00%	0.00%	0.00%
Other race alone (NH)	3	0	3	0.27%	0.00%	0.45%
Mixed race or Multiracial (NH)	22	13	17	1.97%	1.60%	2.57%
Hispanic or Latino (any race)	12	26	5	1.07%	3.21%	0.76%
Total	1,117	810	661	100.00%	100.00%	100.00%

=== 2000 census ===
As of the 2000 census, there were 1,117 people, 407 households, and 264 families residing in the city. The population density was 918.9 inhabitants per square mile (354.8/km^{2}). There were 504 housing units at an average density of 414.6 per square mile (160.1/km^{2}). The racial makeup of the city was 36.53% White, 60.61% African American, 0.18% Native American, 0.18% Asian, 0.45% from other races, and 2.06% from two or more races. Hispanic or Latino of any race were 1.07% of the population.

There were 407 households, out of which 36.1% had children under the age of 18 living with them, 35.1% were married couples living together, 24.6% had a female householder with no husband present, and 35.1% were non-families. 31.9% of all households were made up of individuals, and 15.5% had someone living alone who was 65 years of age or older. The average household size was 2.62 and the average family size was 3.33.

In the city, the population was spread out, with 33.4% under the age of 18, 7.9% from 18 to 24, 22.2% from 25 to 44, 18.3% from 45 to 64, and 18.3% who were 65 years of age or older. The median age was 33 years. For every 100 females, there were 83.1 males. For every 100 females age 18 and over, there were 75.5 males.

The median income for a household in the city was $17,727, and the median income for a family was $20,125. Males had a median income of $27,500 versus $16,250 for females. The per capita income for the city was $11,035. About 38.1% of families and 42.8% of the population were below the poverty line, including 59.7% of those under age 18 and 19.6% of those age 65 or over.

== Education ==
Meridian CUSD 101 is located between Mounds and Mound City east of I-57. Century School District 100 is located on Shawnee College Road between Shawnee College and I-57 near Ullin. Both schools serve grades K-12 and have competitive basketball, baseball, and softball programs. The Districts include Meridian High School and Century High School.

== Notable people ==
- Ivory "Deek" Watson, an original member of the singing group The Ink Spots, was born in Mounds.
- Eric Hargan, former United States Secretary of Health and Human Services
