= Sonny Cox (basketball) =

American musician (1938–2020)

Landon "Sonny" Cox (1938 – May 5, 2020) was an American basketball coach and jazz alto saxophonist.

== Early life ==
Cox's mother, Helen Harris, was a singer and performed with Erskine Hawkins. He first played with The Rocks a Cincinnati-based group that backed Jackie Wilson, Jerry Butler, Solomon Burke, Lavern Baker and other soul artists. In 1955, Cox met organist Ken Prince and they began to work together around Chicago. In 1964, they formed the Three Souls with drummer Robert Shy. The group made three albums for the Argo-Cadet label.

In 1974, Cox became the baseball coach for Paul Robeson High School (Chicago, Illinois). In 1981, he became the basketball coach at King College Prep High School, where he coached three state basketball championship teams. In 2006, Cox was voted as one of the 100 Legends of the IHSA Boys Basketball Tournament, a group of former players and coaches in honor of the 100th. anniversary of the IHSA boys basketball tournament. Among the basketball players whom he coached at King were Marcus Liberty, Levertis Robinson, Jamie Brandon. Imari Sawyer, Rashard Griffith, Thomas Hamilton, Michael Hermon, Emmitt Lynch, Fred Sculfield, Johnnie Selvie, Marcus Cathcings and many other local Chicago sporting luminaries.

== Influences ==
According to jazz critic Joe Segal, Cox was influenced by Earl Bostic and Charlie Parker: "Sonny's general sound is an amalgamation of the jazz feeling (derived from a Charlie Parker spark) and a warm fuzzy throaty sound and approach influenced by the daddy of the rock altoists Earl Bostic" (liner notes of Argo 4036). He also sounds sometimes like Hank Crawford.

== Discography ==
- The Three Souls Dangerous Dan express (Argo Records 4036)(1964)
- The Three Souls Soul Sounds (Argo 4044) (1965)
- Sonny Cox The Wailer (Cadet Records 765) (1966) (with Richard Evans orchestra).
