= Lou McCullough =

American college athletics coach and administrator (1925–2000)

Biographical details
- Born: May 17, 1925; Florence, Alabama, U.S.
- Died: September 8, 2000 (aged 75); Athens, Georgia, U.S.

Coaching career (HC unless noted)

Football
- 1949–1952: Wofford (ends)
- 1953–1956: Wyoming (ends)
- 1957: Indiana (ends)
- 1958–1962: Iowa State (ends)
- 1963–1967: Ohio State (ends)
- 1968–1970: Ohio State (DC)

Administrative career (AD unless noted)
- 1971–1983: Iowa State
- 1983–1991: Trans America Athletic Conference (comm.)

Accomplishments and honors

Championships
- 1 College football national championship (1968)

Louis Garland McCullough Jr. (May 17, 1925 – September 8, 2000) was an American coach and administrator who was the athletic director at Iowa State University from 1971 to 1983.

== Early life ==
McCullough grew up in Florence, Alabama and lettered in football, basketball, and tennis at Coffee High School. After attending the Georgia Military Academy, he entered Wofford College as a pre-dental student. He was a five-sport athlete (football, basketball, baseball, track, and tennis) for the Wofford Terriers and earned his bachelor's degree in three years.

== Coaching ==
During his senior year at Wofford, McCullough was the basketball coach at Spartanburg High School. After graduating, he became an assistant football coach, physical education instructor, and director of intramural sports at Wofford. In 1953, he followed head football coach Phil Dickens to the University of Wyoming. In addition to serving as the Cowboys' end coach, he was responsible for recruiting Alabama, Tennessee, Georgia and Mississippi. In 1957, Dickens and his coaching staff, including McCullough, moved to Indiana University Bloomington. In 1958, McCullough became the lead assistant under Clay Stapleton at Iowa State. The two had previously coached together at Wofford and Wyoming.

In 1963, McCullough left ISU to become an assistant at Ohio State University. McCullough was Woody Hayes' lead assistant and chief recruiter. In 1967, Hayes and McCullough recruited a freshman class that included Jack Tatum, Rex Kern, Bruce Jankowski, Tim Anderson, and Jim Stillwagon, who were key members of Ohio State's 1968 national championship team. Following the 1970 season, McCullough turned down the head coaching positions at Texas Christian University and the University of Iowa. When it was rumored that Hayes would retire following the Buckeyes' loss in the 1971 Rose Bowl, it was seen as a "near certainty" that McCullough would replace him.

== Administration ==
On May 27, 1971, it was announced that McCullough had left coaching to succeed his former boss, Clay Stapleton, as Iowa State's athletic director. During McCullough's tenure, ISU opened several new athletic facilities, including Jack Trice Stadium and Hilton Coliseum, and won eleven National Collegiate Athletic Association national championships (three in wrestling, three in gymnastics, and five in women's cross country).

In 1973, McCullough hired Earle Bruce, whom he had coached with at Ohio State, to succeed Johnny Majors as Iowa State's head football coach. Bruce led the Cyclones to a 36–32 record over six seasons before succeeding Woody Hayes at Ohio State.

In 1980, McCullough led the school's search for a new men's basketball coach. After three candidates, Mike Krzyzewski, Gerald Myers, and Bob Weltlich, turned down the job, he spoke with University of Michigan head coach Johnny Orr about his assistant, Bill Frieder. When Orr learned how much Iowa State was willing to pay Frieder, he took the job himself. Orr would go on lead the team to six NCAA Tournament appearances in fourteen seasons.

McCullough resigned at the end of the 1982–83 school year and was succeeded by his assistant, Max Urick.

After leaving ISU, McCullough worked as a scout for the Dallas Cowboys. On October 31, 1983, he was named commissioner of the Trans America Athletic Conference. He retired on July 31, 1991.

== Later life ==
In 1997, McCullough was inducted into the Wofford Terriers Hall of Fame. On September 8, 2000 – two days after undergoing heart surgery, McCullough suffered a fatal heart attack in Athens, Georgia.
