= Carl J. Richard =

American historian

Carl J. Richard is a professor of history at the University of Louisiana at Lafayette. He specializes in early American history and U.S. intellectual history. He has published several books over the years. He received a Ph.D. from Vanderbilt University in 1988.

== Works ==
- The Founders and the Classics: Greece, Rome, and the American Enlightenment (Harvard University Press, 1994)
- Twelve Greeks and Romans Who Changed the World (Rowman and Littlefield Publishers, 2003)
- The Battle for the American Mind: A Brief History of a Nation's Thought (Rowman & Littlefield Publishers, 2004)
- Greeks and Romans Bearing Gifts: How the Ancients Inspired the Founding Fathers (Rowman & Littlefield Publishers, 2008)
- The Golden Age of the Classics in America (Harvard University Press, 2009)
- Why We're All Romans: The Roman Contribution to the Western World (Rowman & Littlefield Publishers, 2010)
- When the United States Invaded Russia (Rowman & Littlefield Publishers, 2013)
- The Founders and the Bible (Rowman & Littlefield Publishers, 2016)
