= Teutopolis High School =

High school in Illinois, United States

Coordinates: 39°7′45″N 88°29′13″W

Location
- 801 W. Main Street; Teutopolis, Illinois; United States

Information
- School district: 50
- Superintendent: Matthew Sturgeon
- Principal: Tanner Lawson
- Staff: 22.82 (FTE)
- Grades: 9-12
- Enrollment: 345 (2023–2024)
- Student to teacher ratio: 15.12
- Colors: Navy Blue; Gold; White
- Mascot: Wooden Shoes
- Newspaper: Vision
- Website: www.teutopolisschools.org

Teutopolis High School is a high school located in the village of Teutopolis, Illinois, in the United States.

Mascot: Wooden Shoe Team Name: Wooden Shoes Colors: Navy, Gold and White
