= Okawville High School =

High school in Illinois, United States

Okawville Junior/Senior High School

Location
- 400 S Hanover St; Okawville, Washington County, Illinois 62271-2204; United States
- 38°25′38.2″N 89°32′52.3″W

Information
- Type: Public high school
- NCES District ID: 1741750
- CEEB code: 143285
- NCES School ID: 174175004182
- Faculty: 19.05 (on an FTE basis)
- Grades: 7-12
- Enrollment: 230 (2023-2024)
  - Grade 7: 31
  - Grade 8: 33
  - Grade 9: 40
  - Grade 10: 34
  - Grade 11: 47
  - Grade 12: 45
- Student to teacher ratio: 12.07
- Colors: Royal blue and orange
- Nickname: Rockets
- USNWR ranking: 11,972
- Website: sites.google.com/a/okawvillek12.org/ohs/

Okawville Junior/Senior High School is a public secondary school in Okawville, Illinois, United States. The school offers basketball, golf, baseball, softball, track & field, cross-country running, and cheerleading.

In 2024, the Okawville High School women's basketball team defeated Illini Bluffs-Glasford to bring home the IHSA Class 1A state championship trophy.
