= North Lawndale College Prep High School =

Location
- 1616 S Spaulding Ave; Chicago, USA, Illinois 60623; United States; 41.8586°N 87.7082°W

Information
- School type: Charter
- Established: 1998; 28 years ago
- Campus size: 900 students in grades 9 to 12
- Website: www.nlcphs.org

North Lawndale College Prep High School is a charter college preparatory high school in the North Lawndale community on the West Side of Chicago, Illinois.

== History ==
North Lawndale is a community that has struggled for decades with poverty. Schools suffered, along with the rest of the community, through white flight, the riots of the 1960s and the departure of businesses like Sears, Roebuck and Co. The community's population dropped from almost 95,000 in 1970 to just shy of 36,000 in 2010 with foreclosures brought on by the Great Recession accelerating the pace of decline in recent years. Today, the community is 92 percent African-American, with high rates of poverty still a constant. North Lawndale College Prep (NLCP) opened in 1998 to meet the pressing community need of developing an academically rigorous neighborhood school with a strong element of social support.

In the long-troubled North Lawndale community, Chicago Public Schools has turned to private operators to solve the problem of failing schools more than anywhere else in the city. The Steans Family Foundation, which has funded many education efforts in the community at privately run and district-run schools, was involved in the startup of North Lawndale College Prep. Robin Steans, a trustee with the foundation and executive director of Advance Illinois, said North Lawndale has "been a challenged community for a long time" and there are no quick solutions for local schools.

NLCP has two campuses - the Christiana Campus (original) and the Collins Campus opened in 2007. The school serves primarily African American students from low income areas. Many of the students arrive 2-4 grade levels behind. The mission of North Lawndale College Preparatory Charter High School (NLCP) is to prepare young people from under-resourced communities for graduation from high school with the academic skills and personal resilience necessary for successful completion of college.

Both school campuses offer the same curriculum and extra-curricular activities. The school is made up of 78 staff with 55% holding master's degrees and a 14:1 student/teacher ratio. Although students at its two campuses still score below the district average on state standards according to school administrators, 100% of high school seniors have been accepted to college with 70% attending 4 year schools and 30% attending two year schools.

NLCP roster spots are available to all students residing in Chicago and admissions decisions are made on a non-selective basis as part of a random lottery conducted by an objective 3rd party.

In Winter, 2013, the school was featured in the Illinois Network of Charter Schools Policy Brief Measuring What Matters: Building Effective College Pipelines. The report examined the long-held belief that an ACT score of 21 was required for college success. NLCP believes that while test scores are meaningful, they only tell part of the story.

95% of NLCP students live in poverty with an average ACT score of 15.7, but they have a college acceptance rate of 100%, a college enrollment rate of 82% and a college persistence rate of 83%. NLCP administrators believe that measures of academic gains while in high school are better predictors of academic success in college than ACT scores. Perseverance, grit, and other non-cognitive schools appear to be equally important to college success.

Mentorship, tracking and supporting students are also important. NLCP assigns a counselor to each freshman upon entering high school. That counselor not only stays with the assigned freshman for all four years of high school, but also follows them through their first year of college. This strategy is designed to help students - many of whom are the first member of their family to ever go to college - transition into the college environment.

North Lawndale Prep frequently communicates its motto of "The Phoenix Way: Be Peaceful, Responsible, Respectful, and Prepared" to its students and provides opportunities for them to engage in college level work during their senior year. One example of this is a senior project that students continually revise and develop in their last year of school. This requires college level critical thinking, reading, writing, research, and public speaking.

Also, through its Phoenix Rising program, NLCP provides continued enrichment for students during the summer. The program is held at colleges across the country and students experience first hand how to deal with challenges while away from home.

60% of juniors and seniors take at least one Advanced Placement course. Courses offered include: AP Literature and Composition, AP Language and Composition, AP US Government, and AP Government and Politics. Honors classes offered include Honors Algebra 1, Honors Geometry, Honors Advanced Algebra II and Trigonometry, Honors Pre-Calculus, Honors American Literatures, Honors World Literatures, Honors Biology.

== In popular media ==
In 2008, students at the school produced a short film on gun violence, Will I Be Next?". The film was shown at the first Peace on Earth Film Festival.

In 2013, a student from the school was featured in the Al Jazeera America documentary series Edge of Eighteen. He appears in episodes 2 and 3:

Episode 2: Maurice Massonburg lives on the west side of Chicago, which is often called “Chi-raq” due to the wave of gun violence sweeping across the city. Despite the distractions and bad influences in his neighborhood, Maurice attends a charter school (NLCP) committed to helping underprivileged students go to college. This doesn't reduce the mounting pressure he feels to become the first in his family to graduate from high school and attend college.

Episode 3: Once a promising student Maurice Massonburg has all but abandoned his college dreams, resigning himself to the hard knocks of life on the west side of Chicago. Despite impassioned pleas from both his guidance counselor and mother, Maurice remains fixed to his downward spiral of smoking weed and slacking off at school. As graduation approaches, what will he decide to do?
