= Johnny Orr (basketball, born 1927) =

American basketball player and coach (1927–2013)

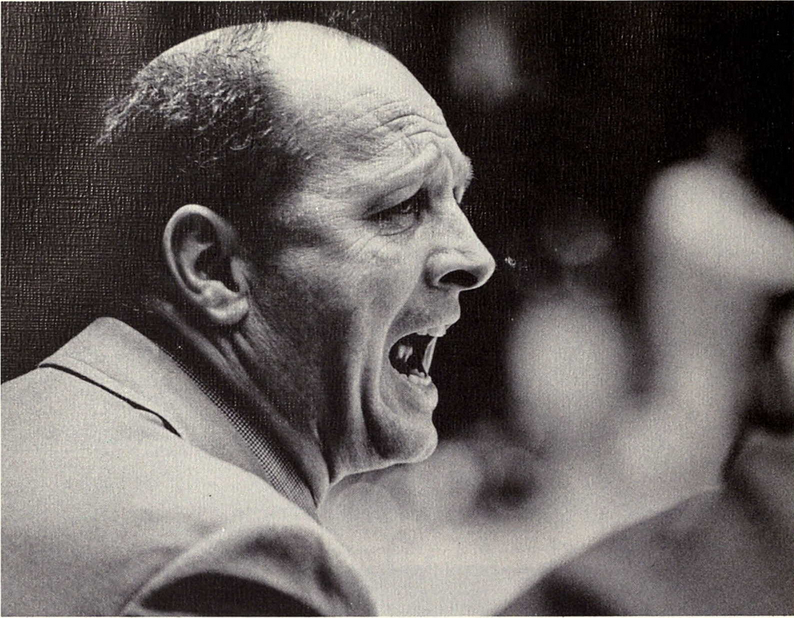
- Orr from the 1975 Michiganensian

Personal information
- Born: June 10, 1927
- Died: December 30, 2013 (aged 86) Des Moines, Iowa, U.S.
- Listed height: 6 ft 3 in (1.91 m)
- Listed weight: 195 lb (88 kg)

Career information
- High school: Taylorville (Taylorville, Illinois)
- College: Illinois (1944–1945); Beloit (1946–1949)
- BAA draft: 1949: 2nd round, 20th overall pick
- Drafted by: St. Louis Bombers
- Playing career: 1949–1950
- Position: Forward
- Number: 12, 9
- Coaching career: 1951–1994

Career history

Playing
- 1949–1950: St. Louis Bombers
- 1950: Waterloo Hawks

Coaching
- 1951–1959: Dubuque HS
- 1959–1963: Wisconsin (assistant)
- 1963–1966: UMass
- 1967–1968: Michigan (assistant)
- 1968–1980: Michigan
- 1980–1994: Iowa State

Career highlights
- NCAA Division I Regional — Final Four (1976); 2× Big Ten regular season champion (1974, 1977); Henry Iba Award (1976); NABC Coach of the Year (1976); 2× Big Ten Coach of the Year (1974, 1977); 100 Legends of the IHSA Boys Basketball Tournament (2007)
- Stats at NBA.com
- Stats at Basketball Reference

John Michael Orr (June 10, 1927 – December 30, 2013) was an American basketball player and coach, best known as the head coach of men's basketball at the University of Massachusetts Amherst, University of Michigan, and at Iowa State University. In the 1975–76 season, Orr was named National Coach of the Year.

== Early life and playing career ==
Orr was born in Taylorville, Illinois or Yale, Kansas and grew up in Taylorville during the Great Depression. Orr attended Taylorville High School under coach Dolph Stanley and in his senior year (1944) led the Tornadoes to a state championship and a 45–0 record, the first team to ever finish a season undefeated in the Illinois High School Association's history. In 2007, Orr was voted one of the "100 Legends of the IHSA Boys Basketball Tournament," recognizing his superior performance in his appearance in the tournament. After high school Orr went to the University of Illinois and was the youngest freshman to compete in three sports. After joining the United States Navy for the end of World War II, Orr returned to the college game at Beloit College. This reunited him with his high school coach Dolph Stanley, who had come to Beloit College as athletic director, head basketball and football coach.

Orr was initially drafted in 1948 BAA draft by the Minneapolis Lakers of the Basketball Association of America, the precursor to the NBA. Orr did not play for the Lakers, and was again drafted the next year in the 2nd round by the St. Louis Bombers. In 1950, Orr played 21 games for the Bombers before moving to the Waterloo Hawks for 13 more games.

== Coaching career ==
In 1951, Orr was named as head coach at Dubuque Senior High School in Dubuque, Iowa, holding the position until 1959. In 1959, Orr joined the collegiate ranks, becoming an assistant coach at Wisconsin.

=== UMass ===
Orr attained his first collegiate head coaching position in 1963 at UMass, where he guided the team to 15–9 record in 1963–64.

=== Michigan ===
After three seasons at UMass, Orr moved to the University of Michigan in 1967, serving as an assistant under head coach Dave Strack for one season.

In 1968 Orr was named head coach at Michigan, a position he would hold for 12 seasons. His 1973–74 team made it to the Elite Eight in the NCAA tournament and Orr was named Big Ten Coach of the Year. In 1976, Michigan was the NCAA tournament runner-up (to the undefeated Indiana Hoosiers) and Orr was named National Coach of the Year. His 209 wins were the most in Michigan history until John Beilein passed him in 2017.

=== Iowa State ===
Orr left Michigan to become the head coach of the Iowa State Cyclones in 1980, a program that had only one postseason appearance of any sort in school history, when it went to the Final Four in 1944. Orr would go on lead the team to six NCAA Tournaments in 14 seasons. The surprise move to Iowa State in 1980 came about when the Iowa State athletic director, Lou McCullough, called to inquire about Orr's assistant, Bill Frieder. When Orr learned how much Iowa State was willing to pay Frieder, Orr negotiated the job for himself. Iowa State initially paid Orr $45,000 annually compared to his $33,665 salary at Michigan. Frieder then would succeed Orr at Michigan. In Orr's fourth season in Ames, Orr led the Cyclones to the 1984 NIT–only the second postseason appearance of any sort in school history. The following season, he led the Cyclones to their first NCAA Tournament berth in 40 years. The following season, Orr's Cyclones reached the Sweet Sixteen of the 1986 NCAA Division I men's basketball tournament with a second round victory over the number five ranked team in the nation, Michigan. Orr claims this was the greatest victory of his career. Orr led Iowa State to four more NCAA tournament berths before retiring from Iowa State in 1994. He remains the winningest coach in Iowa State history with 218 wins.

== Hilton Coliseum ==
Orr's Iowa State teams won 76.7% of their games at Hilton Coliseum. Under Orr, attendance numbers more than doubled from the 6,000 fan average that preceded his arrival. The school band would play the theme from The Tonight Show as Orr entered the arena floor before each game and Orr would give a fist pump to the Iowa State crowd. Orr coached Iowa State to 20 victories over teams ranked in the top 25 at Hilton, with writers coining the term “Hilton Magic.”

Currently at Hilton Coliseum, Iowa State donors have access to "Johnny's", a sports bar themed space on the east side of Hilton Coliseum. There are multiple flat-screen TVs as well as food served before the game and snacks served at halftime. Alcoholic beverages are served at the bars. A statue of Johnny Orr sits at the entrance along with cases full of memorabilia from his tenure at Iowa State.

== Death ==
Orr died on December 30, 2013, at the age of 86 at Iowa Methodist Medical Center in Des Moines. Orr suffered from complications from a head injury from a fall at home.

== Awards and honors ==
Taylorville High School Hall of Fame (athlete)

1969 – Beloit College Hall of Fame (athlete)

1973 – National Association of Intercollegiate Athletics (NAIA) Hall Of Fame (Athlete)

1973 – Illinois Basketball Coaches Association Hall of Fame

1973–1974 – Big Ten Coach of the Year

1975–1976 – National Association of Basketball Coaches (NABC) National Coach of the Year

1992 – Dubuque Senior High School Hall of Fame

2001 – Iowa State University Hall of Fame

2004 – Des Moines Register Hall of Fame

2011 – Statue erected in Hilton Coliseum

2011– University of Michigan Hall of Honor

== Career statistics ==
Legend
GP	Games played	GS	Games started	MPG	Minutes per game
FG%	Field goal percentage	3P%	3-point field goal percentage	FT%	Free throw percentage
RPG	Rebounds per game	APG	Assists per game	SPG	Steals per game
BPG	Blocks per game	PPG	Points per game	**Bold**	Career high

=== Playing career ===
==== NBA ====
===== Regular season =====
Year	Team	GP	FG%	FT%	APG	PPG
1949–50	St. Louis	**21**	**.362**	**.857**	.3	1.9
1949–50	Waterloo	13	.324	**.857**	**1.1**	**4.0**
Career		34	.339	.857	.6	2.7

=== Head coaching record ===
==== College ====
Record table
Season	Team	Overall	Conference	Standing	Postseason
**UMass Redmen** (Yankee Conference) (1963–1966)
1963–64	UMass	15–9	5–5	3rd	
1964–65	UMass	13–11	8–2	2nd	
1965–66	UMass	11–13	5–5	3rd	
UMass:		39–33	18–12		
**Michigan Wolverines** (Big Ten Conference) (1968–1980)
1968–69	Michigan	13–11	7–7	4th	
1969–70	Michigan	10–14	5–9	T–6th	
1970–71	Michigan	19–7	12–2	2nd	NIT Quarterfinal
1971–72	Michigan	14–10	9–5	T–3rd	
1972–73	Michigan	13–11	6–8	T–6th	
1973–74	Michigan	22–5	12–2	T–1st	NCAA Division I Elite Eight
1974–75	Michigan	19–8	12–6	2nd	NCAA Division I First Round
1975–76	Michigan	25–7	14–4	2nd	NCAA Division I Runner-up
1976–77	Michigan	26–4	16–2	1st	NCAA Division I Elite Eight
1977–78	Michigan	16–11	11–7	T–4th	
1978–79	Michigan	15–12	8–10	6th	
1979–80	Michigan	17–13	8–10	T–6th	NIT Third Round
Michigan:		209–113	120–72		
**Iowa State Cyclones** (Big Eight Conference) (1980–1994)
1980–81	Iowa State	9–18	2–12	8th	
1981–82	Iowa State	10–17	5–9	6th	
1982–83	Iowa State	13–15	5–9	5th	
1983–84	Iowa State	16–13	6–8	T–4th	NIT First Round
1984–85	Iowa State	21–13	7–7	T–3rd	NCAA Division I First Round
1985–86	Iowa State	22–11	9–5	2nd	NCAA Division I Sweet 16
1986–87	Iowa State	13–15	5–9	6th	
1987–88	Iowa State	20–12	6–8	5th	NCAA Division I First Round
1988–89	Iowa State	17–12	7–7	T–4th	NCAA Division I First Round
1989–90	Iowa State	10–18	4–10	6th	
1990–91	Iowa State	12–19	6–8	5th	
1991–92	Iowa State	21–13	5–9	T–6th	NCAA Division I Second Round
1992–93	Iowa State	20–11	8–6	T–2nd	NCAA Division I First Round
1993–94	Iowa State	14–13	4–10	T–6th	
Iowa State:		218–200	79–117		
Total:		466–346			
National champion Postseason invitational champion Conference regular season champion Conference regular season and conference tournament champion Division regular season champion Division regular season and conference tournament champion Conference tournament champion

== See also ==
- List of NCAA Division I Men's Final Four appearances by coach
