= Meridian High School (Mounds, Illinois) =

Location
- 728 S Wall St; Mounds, Illinois 62544; United States
- Coordinates: 37°7′49.2″N 89°10′8.3″W

Information
- Type: Public
- Motto: "It's a great day to be a Bobcat!!!"
- Principal: Tim Turner
- Teaching staff: 14.66 (FTE)
- 1401 Mounds Rd: 6-12
- Enrollment: 210 (2023–2024)
- Student to teacher ratio: 14.32
- Campus: Rural
- Color: Red White
- Mascot: Bobcat
- Website: http://www.meridian101.com/

Meridian High School is a senior high school located in Mounds, Illinois, United States, serving grades 9–12.
