= Taylorville High School =

Public high school in Taylorville, Illinois, U.S.

Coordinates: 39.5628°N 89.3035°W

Taylorville Senior High School

Location
- 815 Springfield Road; Taylorville, (Christian County), Illinois 62568; United States

Information
- Type: Public high school
- Principal: Matthew Hutchison
- Teaching staff: 52.30 (FTE)
- Enrollment: 783 (2023–2024)
- Student to teacher ratio: 14.97
- Colors: Purple and gold
- Athletics conference: Apollo
- Nickname: Tornadoes
- Website: ths.tcusd3.org/o/ths

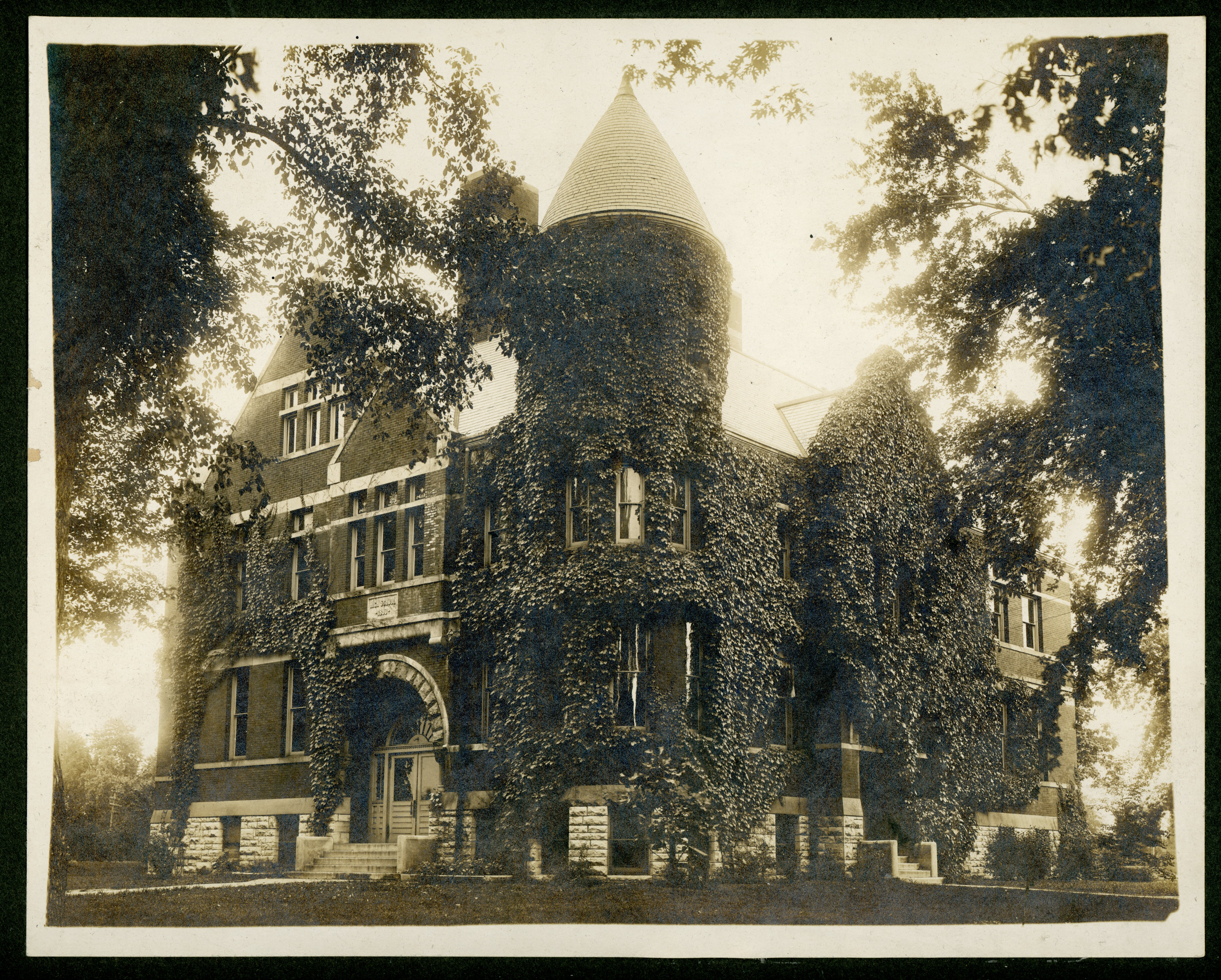
Taylorville High School in 1913

Taylorville Senior High School is a four-year public high school located in Taylorville, Illinois. The mascot is Tommy Tornado. The school colors are purple and gold.

THS is part of TCUSD #3 which also includes a middle-school, three elementary schools located in Taylorville and Mt. Auburn Elementary School and Stonington Elementary. However, at the end of the 2008–09 academic school year, West Elementary School and Mt. Auburn closed.

== Publications ==
The THS journalism class publishes a monthly-newspaper and annual yearbook, the Zephyr and Drift, respectively. As of the 2011–12 school year, the Zephyr is also available through a full-color online PDF version.

== Notable alumni ==
- Ron Bontemps, Captain of the 1952 U.S. men's basketball team, which won the gold medal.
- Jon Corzine, former governor of New Jersey
- Vern Mullen, professional football player (Canton Bulldogs, Chicago Bears, Chicago Cardinals, and Pottsville Maroons)
- Johnny Orr, former UMass, Michigan, and Iowa State head basketball coach
- Pat Perry, former Major League Baseball player (St. Louis Cardinals, Cincinnati Reds, Chicago Cubs, Los Angeles Dodgers)
- Doug Quick - Broadcast weatherman, author & museum curator; born in Taylorville, graduated from Taylorville High School
- Bill Ridley, All-American basketball player at the University of Illinois

== Notable staff ==
- Dolph Stanley, Hall of fame coach that guided the 1944 Tornadoes to the first undefeated state championship in the history of Illinois. Stanley is best known for holding the "unbreakable" record of guiding five different Illinois High School Association (IHSA) schools into the state tournament.
