= Lawrenceville High School =

Coordinates: 38°43′58″N 87°40′48″W

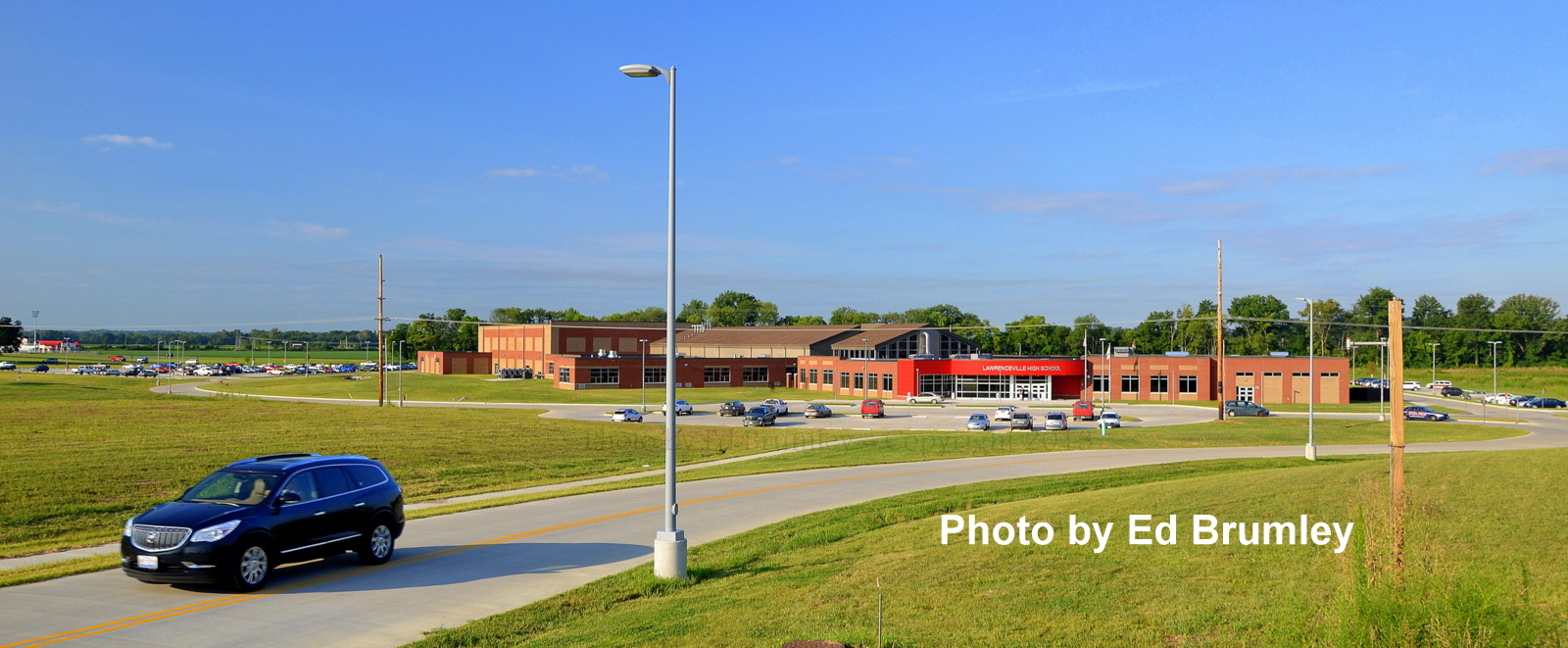
- 2013 high school on west side of Lawrenceville
- Lawrenceville, Illinois 62439; United States

Information
- School type: public
- Status: Closed
- Closed: Abandoned
- Locale: Lawrence County
- School district: Lawrence County Community Unit School District 20
- NCES District ID: Cusd 20
- Superintendent: Doug Daugherty (Since 2013)
- Principal: Lance Boldt
- Teaching staff: 29.73 (FTE)
- Grades: 9–12
- Gender: coeducational
- Enrollment: 290 (2023–2024)
- International students: 3
- Student to teacher ratio: 9.75
- Colors: Red and White
- Athletics conference: Little Illini Conference
- Nickname: Indians
- Website: www.cusd20.com/o/lhs
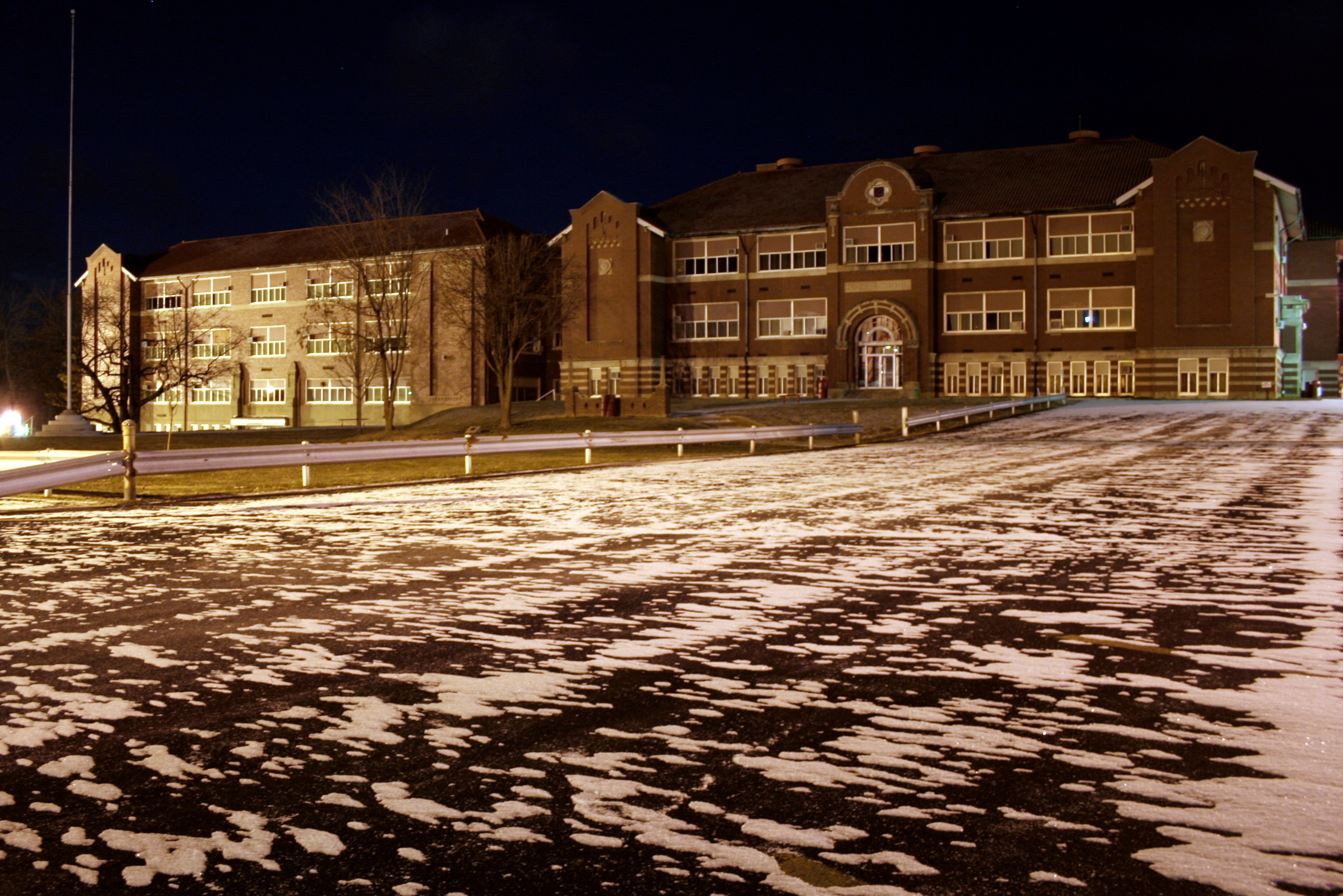
- old high school at 503 8th St.

Lawrenceville High School is a 9th–12th grade high school located in Lawrenceville, Illinois.

Lawrenceville has won four state championships (1972, 1974, 1982, 1983) and as of 2012 has the state record for the longest winning streak of 68–0, accomplished during the 1982 and 1983 seasons.

== Notable alumni ==
- Frances Crane
- Marty Simmons
