= Centralia High School (Illinois) =

Location
- 2100 East Calumet; Centralia, Illinois; United States; 38°31′13″N 89°06′13″W

Information
- Type: Public
- School district: Centralia High School District 200
- NCES School ID: 170930000538
- Principal: Reid Shipley
- Teaching staff: 69.00 (on FTE basis)
- Grades: 9 to 12
- Enrollment: 897 (2023–2024)
- Student to teacher ratio: 13.00
- Colors: Cardinal and white
- Athletics conference: South 7
- Website: centraliahs.org

Centralia High School is a public high school located in Centralia, Illinois, United States. It is one of the two high schools in Centralia.
