= Teutopolis, Illinois =

- Village
- Motto: Home of the Wooden Shoes
- Location of Teutopolis within Illinois
- Coordinates: 39°07′40″N 88°29′30″W
- Country: United States
- State: Illinois
- County: Effingham

Area
  - Total: 2.04 sq mi (5.29 km^{2})
  - Land: 2.04 sq mi (5.29 km^{2})
  - Water: 0 sq mi (0.00 km^{2})
- Elevation: 600 ft (180 m)

Population (2020)
  - Total: 1,618
  - Density: 792.1/sq mi (305.82/km^{2})
- Time zone: UTC-6 (CST)
  - Summer (DST): UTC-5 (CDT)
- Postal code: 62467
- Area code: 217
- FIPS code: 17-74743
- GNIS ID: 2399962
- Website: teutopolis.com

Teutopolis is a village in Effingham County, Illinois. As of the 2020 census it had a population of 1,618.

== History ==
Teutopolis, "City of the Teutons", or Germans, was established in 1839 along the National Road, now U.S. Route 40. It is the only town in the United States with this name.

Clemens Uptmor from the Duchy of Oldenburg, and Kingdom of Hanover, Germany, came to the United States in 1834 along with his brother Herman H. Uptmor and a few neighbors. They settled first in Cincinnati, then the gateway to the west for German Catholics. In 1837 they formed a land company for the purchase of government land under the name of "Deutsche Land-Compagnie oder Ansiedlungsgesellschaft". John F. Waschefort, Clemens Uptmor and Gerard H. Bergfeld were named to find a location for settlement and then give their recommendations to the land company. The committee opposed settling in Missouri because of slavery and were discouraged from settling in the north central area of Illinois because of the swamps and the black soil. The northeast part of Effingham County was recommended because of the woodlands, well-drained uplands and plentiful game.

Gerhardt Meyer and Heinrich Roennebaum accompanied the original trio back to Illinois to inspect the proposed site. The location was approved, and in July 1839 in Vandalia the land was claimed for homestead purposes in the name of John F. Waschefort. 10,000 acres (4,000 ha) were purchased at $1.25 per acre, with an additional 80 acres (32 ha) being purchased for $5.00 an acre. The town site was surveyed and platted by William J. Hankins. The plan of the town was very similar to the plat of the original town of Cincinnati.

Back in Cincinnati the land was allotted at a drawing held in a fire engine house. For each $50.00 a member contributed he received one "in-lot" and one "out-lot" or "garden lot" in the town and an additional parcel of farmland for a total of 40 acres (16 ha).

== Geography ==
Teutopolis is located in northeastern Effingham County and U.S. Route 40 (National Road) passes through the center of the village, leading west 4 miles (6 km) into Effingham, the county seat, and east 5.5 miles (8.9 km) to Montrose.

According to the 2021 census gazetteer files, Teutopolis has a total area of 2.04 square miles (5.28 km^{2}), all land.

== Demographics ==
Historical population
Census	Pop.	Note	%±
1900	498		—
1910	592		18.9%
1920	728		23.0%
1930	710		−2.5%
1940	806		13.5%
1950	919		14.0%
1960	1,140		24.0%
1970	1,249		9.6%
1980	1,414		13.2%
1990	1,417		0.2%
2000	1,559		10.0%
2010	1,530		−1.9%
2020	1,618		5.8%
U.S. Decennial Census

=== 2020 census ===
As of the 2020 census, Teutopolis had a population of 1,618. There were 499 families in the village. The population density was 791.97 inhabitants per square mile (305.78/km^{2}).

The median age was 36.0 years. 27.2% of residents were under the age of 18 and 17.1% were 65 years of age or older. For every 100 females there were 103.0 males, and for every 100 females age 18 and over there were 102.8 males age 18 and over.

93.9% of residents lived in urban areas, while 6.1% lived in rural areas.

Of the 606 households, 35.1% had children under the age of 18 living in them. Of all households, 58.7% were married-couple households, 16.7% were households with a male householder and no spouse or partner present, and 19.0% were households with a female householder and no spouse or partner present. About 23.4% of all households were made up of individuals and 12.3% had someone living alone who was 65 years of age or older. The average household size was 2.97 and the average family size was 2.37.

There were 630 housing units, of which 3.8% were vacant. The homeowner vacancy rate was 0.2% and the rental vacancy rate was 9.0%. The average housing unit density was 308.37 units per square mile (119.06 units/km^{2}).

Racial composition as of the 2020 census
Race	Number	Percent
White	1,575	97.3%
Black or African American	1	0.1%
American Indian and Alaska Native	2	0.1%
Asian	6	0.4%
Native Hawaiian and Other Pacific Islander	0	0.0%
Some other race	9	0.6%
Two or more races	25	1.5%
Hispanic or Latino (of any race)	13	0.8%

=== Income and poverty ===
The median income for a household in the village was $72,404, and the median income for a family was $95,583. Males had a median income of $47,794 versus $27,292 for females. The per capita income for the village was $34,393. About 1.0% of families and 3.9% of the population were below the poverty line, including 0.0% of those under age 18 and 13.0% of those age 65 or over.

== Ferd Metten, Teutopolis Folk Artist ==
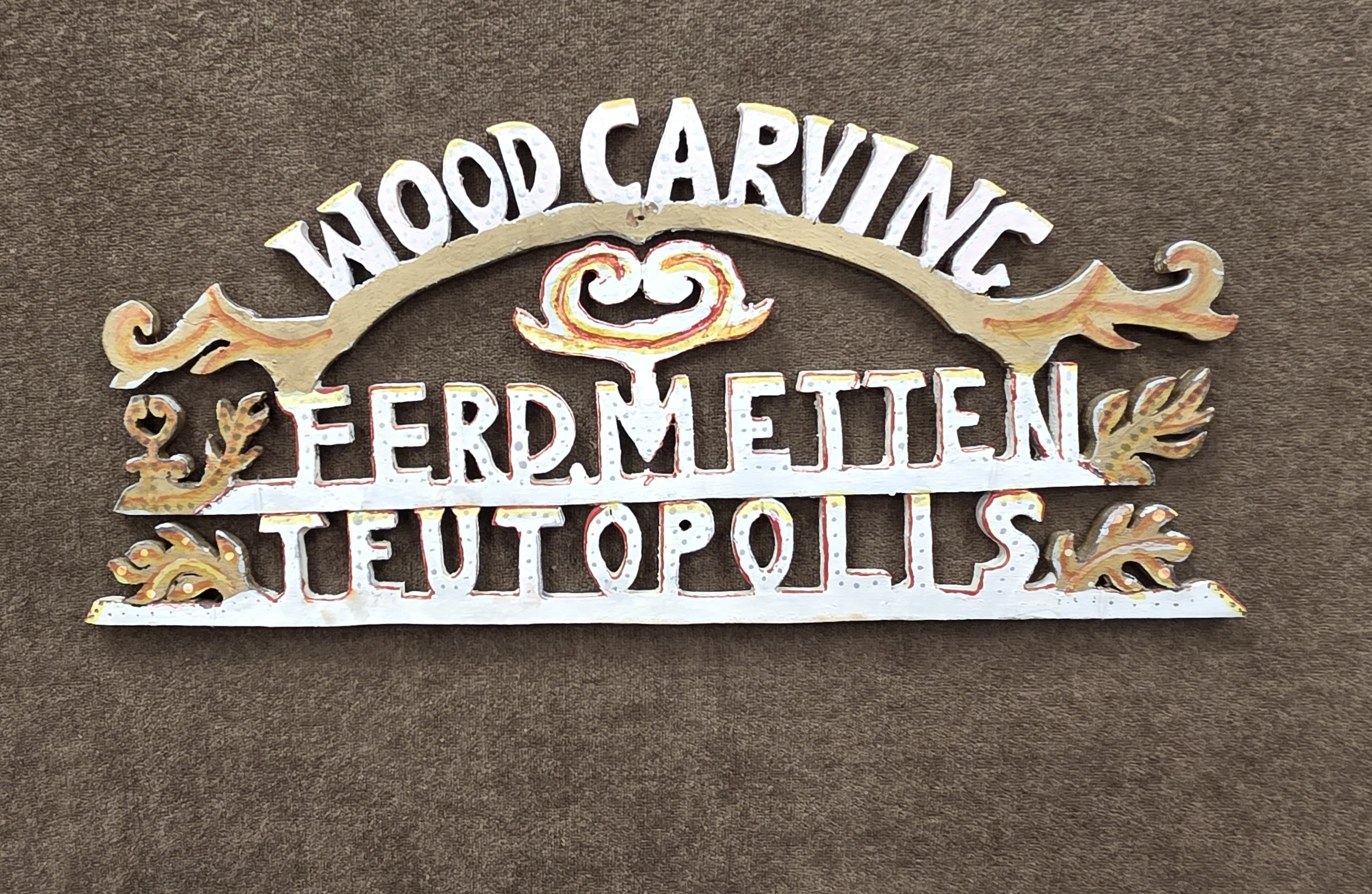
Ferd Metten carving

Ferd Metten was a carver from rural Teutopolis who actively created folk art during the 1940s-1970s era. Ferd's grandfather was Joseph Metten. Joseph was born in Hanover, Saxony, Germany, circa 1808. He emigrated to the United States and married Maria Wilhemenia Wilthorn in Cincinnati, Ohio around 1840. The couple moved to Teutopolis, and Ferd's father, Henry Metten, was born in 1853. Henry Metten married Ferd's mother, Theresia Catherine Krone, in 1883. Henry Metten died in 1916. Theresia Krone Metten lived to be 91 and died in 1961. Ferd Metten was born on October 28, 1893 and died on October 19, 1977. He is buried in St. Francis Parish Cemetery in Teutopolis, Illinois.

Years after his death, Ferd Metten received some national recognition. His biography in a volume about American self-taught art was short and to the point: Metten worked as a farmer. He began art at age 47 and made dioramas of painted wood and carvings, many of them mechanized. Subjects were rural, memories, people, religion, politics. Style was representational.

Mr. Metten's work was displayed locally around Teutopolis before it attracted attention elsewhere. There was an exhibit in the west window of Wessel and Fulle's store on Route 40 three years in a row, starting in 1954. A square dance diorama was mentioned. It was very detailed and took over 400 hours for him to complete. The 1954 and 1955 display was a steam powered threshing machine diorama. That artwork included the threshing machine, a separator, several field hands, a grain wagon, stacks of straw bundles, a straw stack, an extra team of horses with a driver aboard, and a rail fence with chickens perched on top. Mr. Metten said it took him a full year to complete it.

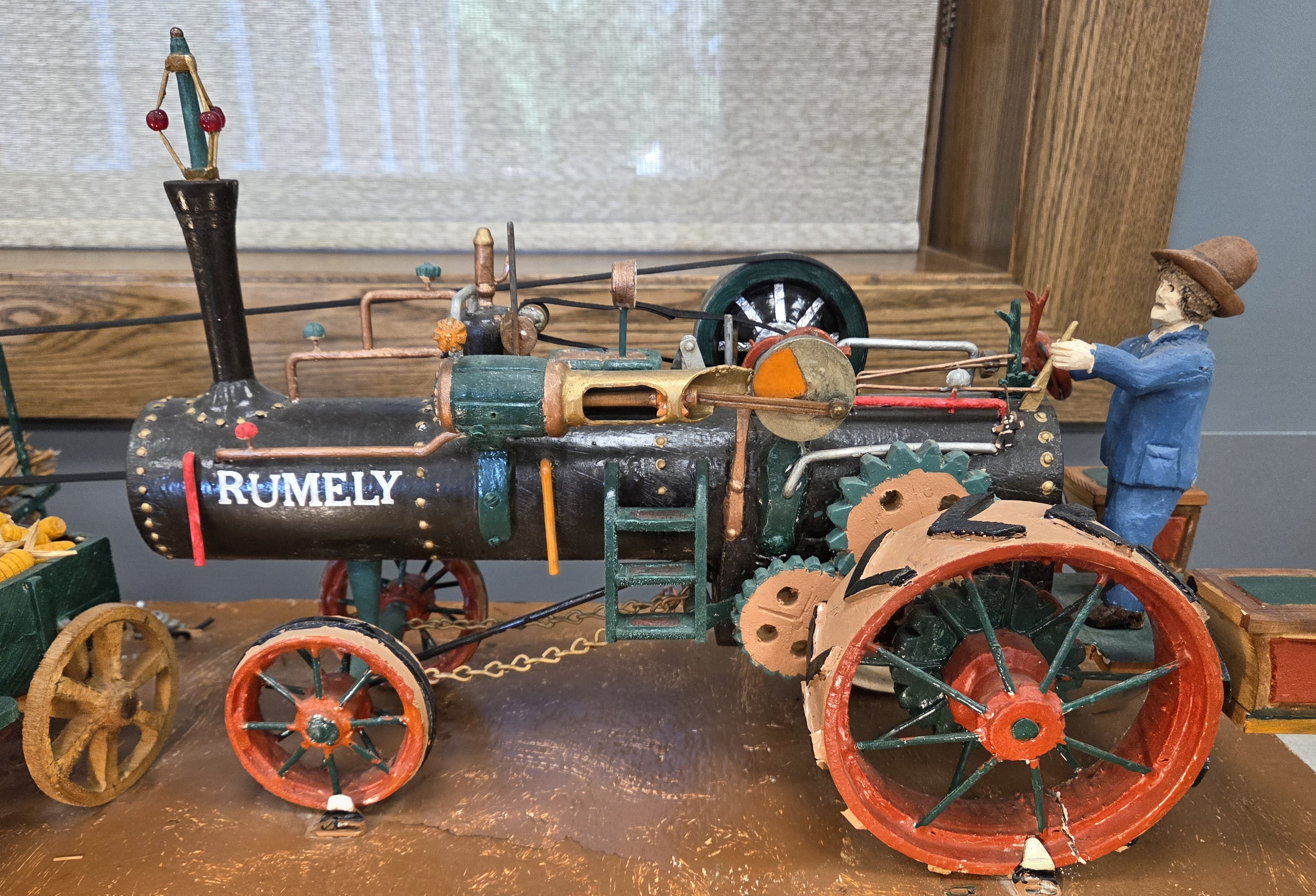
Rumley Oil Pull

Mr. Metten's carvings went further afield in the 1960s. When the Power Progress Show was held in Pickneyville, Illinois in August 1966, Harry and Ferd Metten attended, along with Ed Jansen, Hank Ruholl, and Leo Vahling. Mr. Jansen showed a 1936 Rumley, and Harry Metten exhibited a Rumley Oil Pull. Ferd Metten put some of his carvings on display, one of which was a Rumley Oil Pull. The Rumley was fueled by kerosene. The brand originated with a family of German immigrants from LaPorte, Indiana. The company pioneered big tractors and threshing machines, starting in the 1880s.

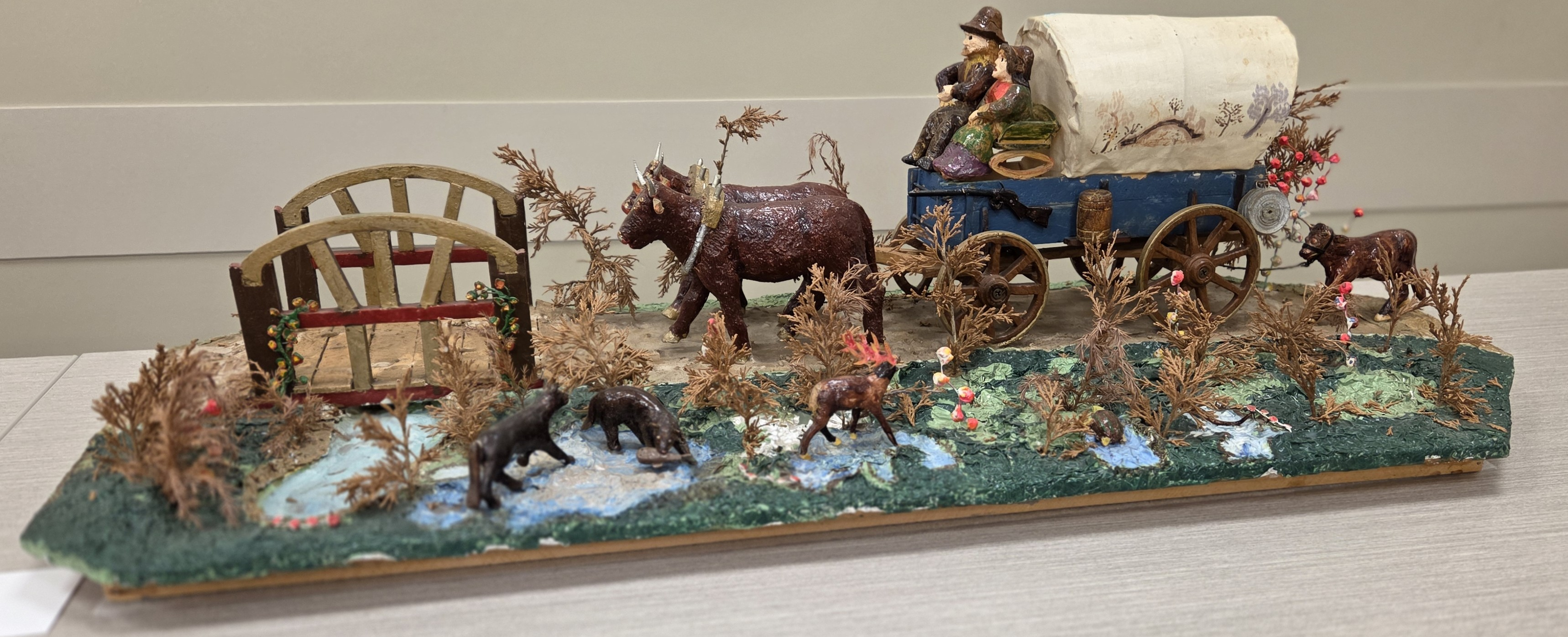
Ferd Metten carving, The Westward Movement

There was an exhibit of seven of his diorama in May 1965 at the Helen Mathes Library in Effingham. The city's public library was on Market Street at the time. Among the works displayed were The Village Store, A Village Wedding, The Fiddlers, and The Westward Movement. The latter had been created in honor of the Teutopolis Quasiquicentennial in 1965.

Teutopolis was part of the Illinois Sesquicentennial celebration in the 1960s. The Effingham Regional Historical Society planned an October, 1967 road tour of local historic sites. In or near Teutopolis, those sites included St. Joseph Seminary, the Franciscan Monestery and Masoleum, St. Francis Church, the Our Lady of Lourdes shrine, the Waschfort Home (Habing Funeral Home), and the 1839 Vahling log cabin. In addition, Ferd Metten exhibited his carvings at his family's home just down the road and across the crick from St. Francis Parish Cemetery.

The following month, Ferd Metten took his carvings across the county line into Lillyville. The Lillyville Grade School was part of School District No. 50. On November 15, 1967, the Joliet Franciscan Sisters stationed at Lillyville hosted an evening for the entire Unit No. 50 Grade School faculty, as well as for the Sisters from Sigel Grade School in Shelby County. A Sigel Franciscan and a Chicago Franciscan gave a Music Demonstration. An Art Appreciation exhibit of Ferd Metten's folk art work was set up in the Lillyville Grade School basement.

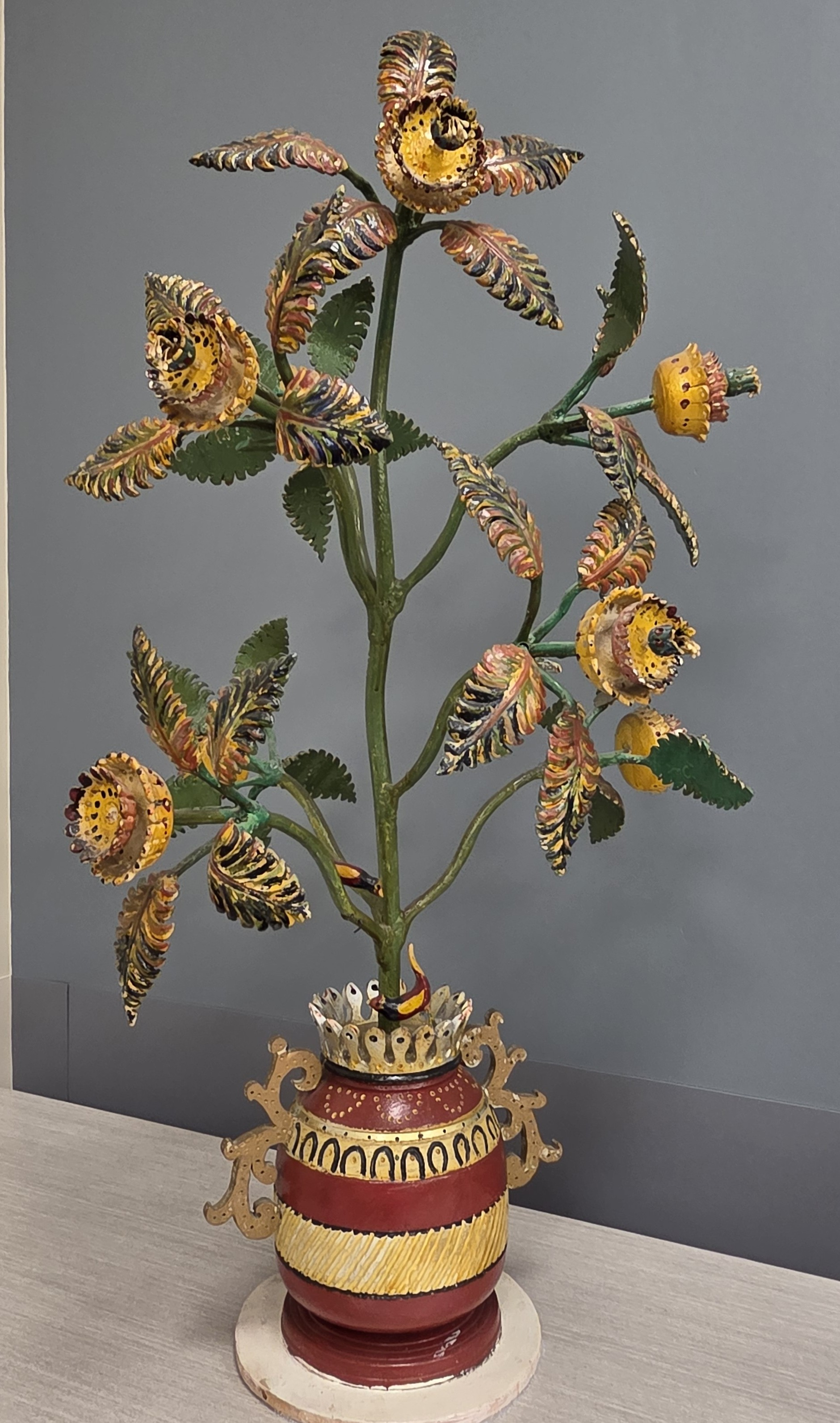
Ferd Metten Folk Art Flowers

In the summer of 1968, the Effingham Historical Society collaborated with the Campground Owners Association of Effingham to promote interests in camping, crafts, local events and historic sites by producing a brochure, Effingham Outdoors. The Old Settlers Reunion was one of the outdoor events, and Ferd Metten was part of it. The Sesquicentennial Old Settlers Reunion was held on the Effingham Court House lawn. What was the courthouse then is now the Effingham County Museum. The Effingham Handicrafters participated. Multiple crafts were exhibited and demonstrated during the September 6–8, 1968 event. There was weaving, chair caning, wool spinning, and candle making, among other things. Ferd showed his work and demonstrated his techniques at a table on the lawn.

Displays of Ferd's work continued locally up through the time of his death in 1977, both at his home and in the village of Teutopolis. In May 1971, he and his family entertained twelve nuns from St. Dominic's Convent in Breeze, Illinois. On Ascension Thursday, the women started their day at the Charles Hotze home. The Hotze's daughter, Sister Jane Marie, was the convent superior. After that, they went on a hayride and ended up at the Metten homestead. Ferd showed them his carvings and Harry explained their saw mill and other machinery. The boys' sister, Emma, put out her many quilts for their viewing. The nuns voted it a enjoyable and educational trip.

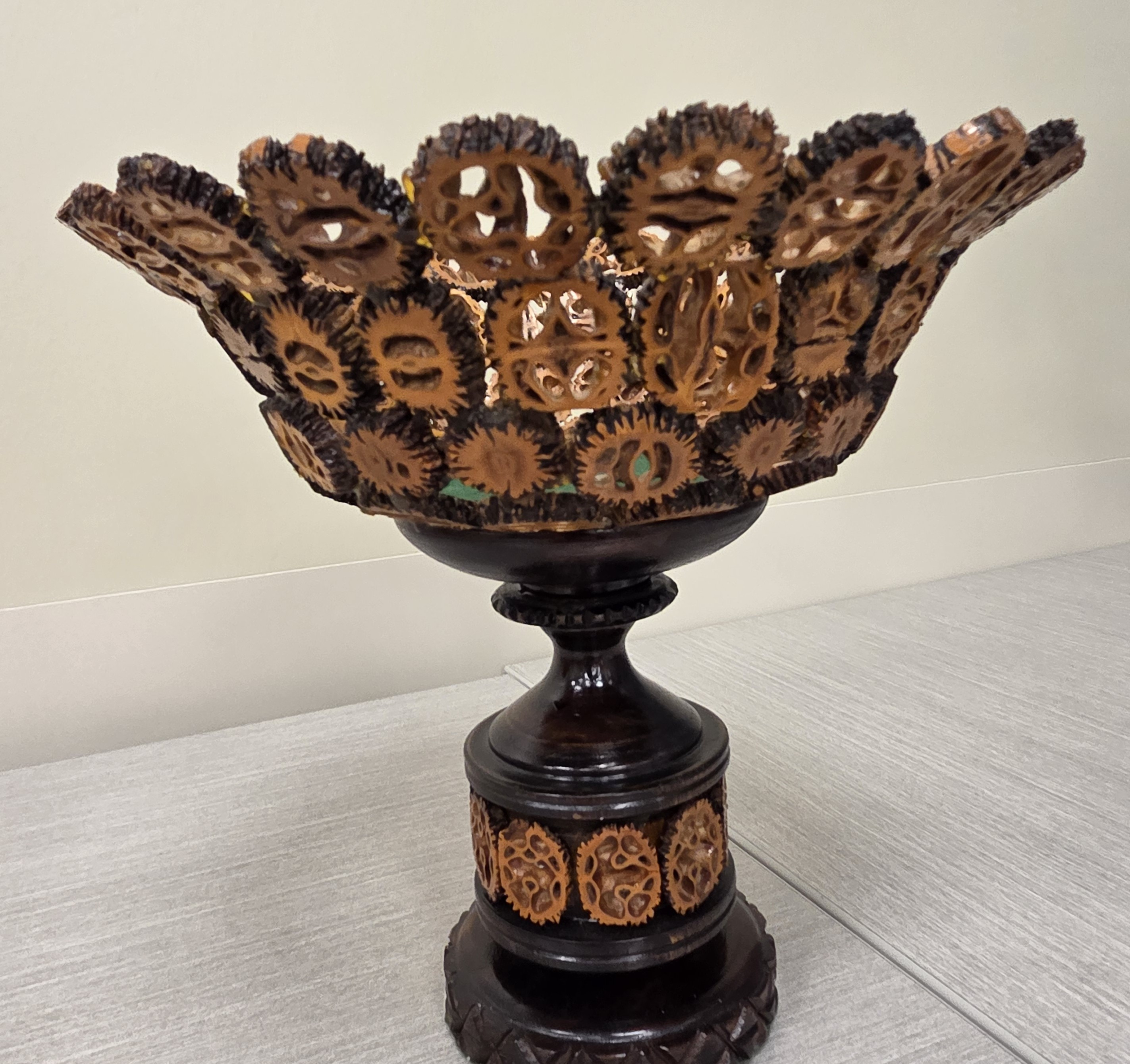
Compote made of sliced walnut shells

That same year, his work was shown at the Knights of Columbus Annual Picnic in Teutopolis. At the time, the Knights were in charge of the Monastery Library and Museum. Ferd Metten's folk art was also part of the Annual Cancer Day Parade and Picnic that originated with a local dentist, Dr. F. L. Weber. In 1976, the Teutopolis Monastery Museum was open on the first Sunday of the month on a fairly regular basis. Ferd's creation made of sliced walnut shells was mentioned as a unique feature.

The visibility of Ferd Metten's art moved onto the regional scene in 1977 when it was featured with work of other folk artists at Eastern Illinois University. It was part of "Celebration '77 - A Festival of the Arts" in the Paul Sargent Art Gallery. Mr. Phil Settle was on staff at the School of Fine Arts at EIU at the time. He was active in a grant-funded field investigation of regional folk artists. Vaughn Janike was the Dean of School of Fine Arts and he wrote the grant. The area of state being investigated was bounded by I-57 to the west, Illinois Route 36 to the north, the Indiana border to the east, and south to the Ohio River. Field researchers located and visited artists like Ferd Metten to examine the validity and quality of their work. One of the investigators was Jens (Jeff) Lund. He was a Danish immigrant and naturalized American citizen. Lund was a doctoral student at Indiana University, majoring in Americana and Folk Art. Because of Settle's preparation and Lund's fieldwork, Ferd Metten's carvings made the cut for inclusion in EIU's 1977 festival.

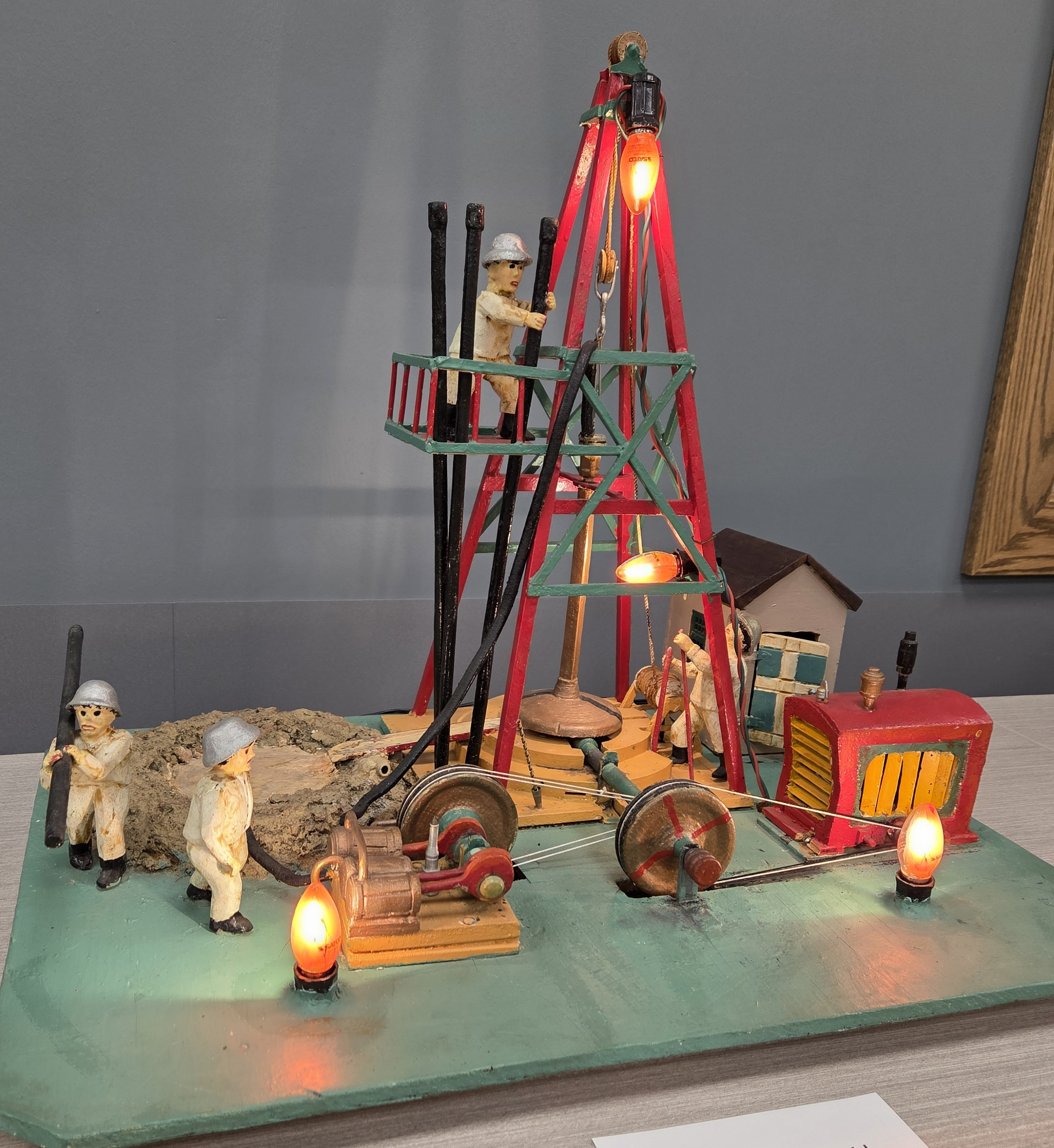
Metten carved oil rig

Some of Ferd Metten's work was wired and lit with 1960s era Christmas tree bulbs. One of them was a diorama of an oil drilling rig. Ferd and his brother drove their farm equipment from their home on the hill over Salt Creek to outlying parcels to the east, and Ferd would have seen these drill rigs in action. A work crew was always present and drilling went on 24 hours a day. Ferd had a keen eye for detail and the light at the top of his carved rig was in exactly the right place.

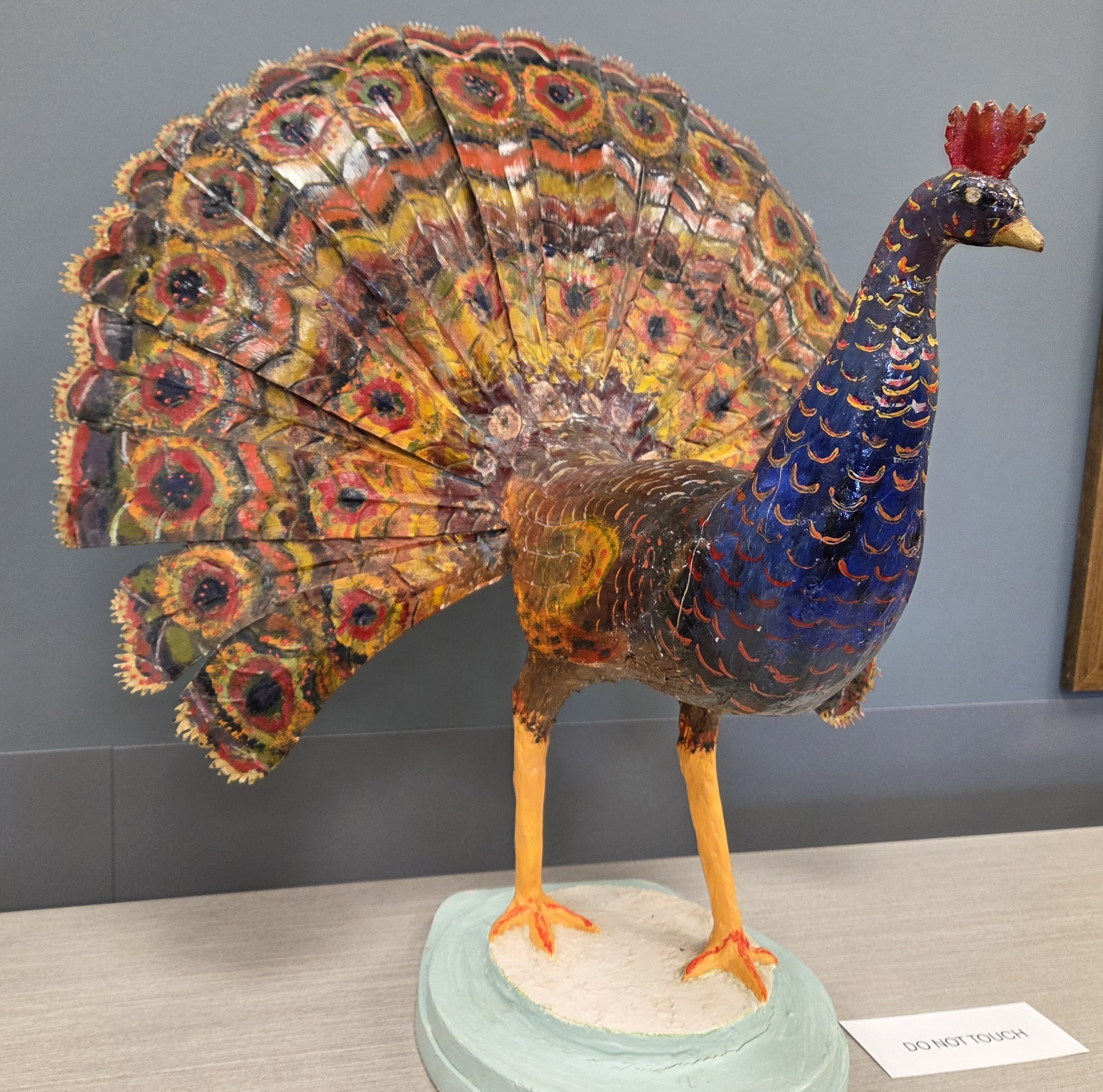
Ferd Metten Peacock

About a year after Ferd Metten's death in 1977, Eastern Illinois University purchased the collection from his heirs. The purchase was funded by the Merrill Trust, and it included 16 dioramas. They ranged in size from 18 inches by 24 inches, to 24 inches by 48 inches. The dioramas contained a range of 14 to 44 small pieces. Phil Settle said of the collection, "it is unique in its style and vision, and it documents the social, religious and economic heritage of the predominantly German community of Teutopolis. Mr. Settle was particularly taken with Mr. Metten's carving of a peacock, and he put it on display immediately. In an article in an alumni journal, he wrote of it, "expertly carved and exquisitely painted, the object is one example of the fascinating and rare works collected recently."

After Mr. Metten's work was added to the EIU folk art collection, it was displayed regularly at the Tarble Art Center. The 1987 exhibition of folk art was called "Flights of Fancy". Ferd's Nativity diorama was the work displayed. This nativity has some unusual features. The figures inside the creche are dressed in the tradition of Palestine. On the other hand, Ferd found a way to add some of his past and his current world to the story. His grandfather was born in Germany and immigrated here, so Mr. Metten was just two generations away from the old country. He lived with his mother, who was just one generation away. The creche structure is that of a traditional half-timbered style German home with shutters and a tiled roof. The grounds around the structure are also unique. The camel and the palm trees are expected, but the ten-point buck is not a native of Palestine. The shepherds tending the sheep are dressed in early twentieth farmer garb consisting of shirts and overall pants, complete with suspenders.

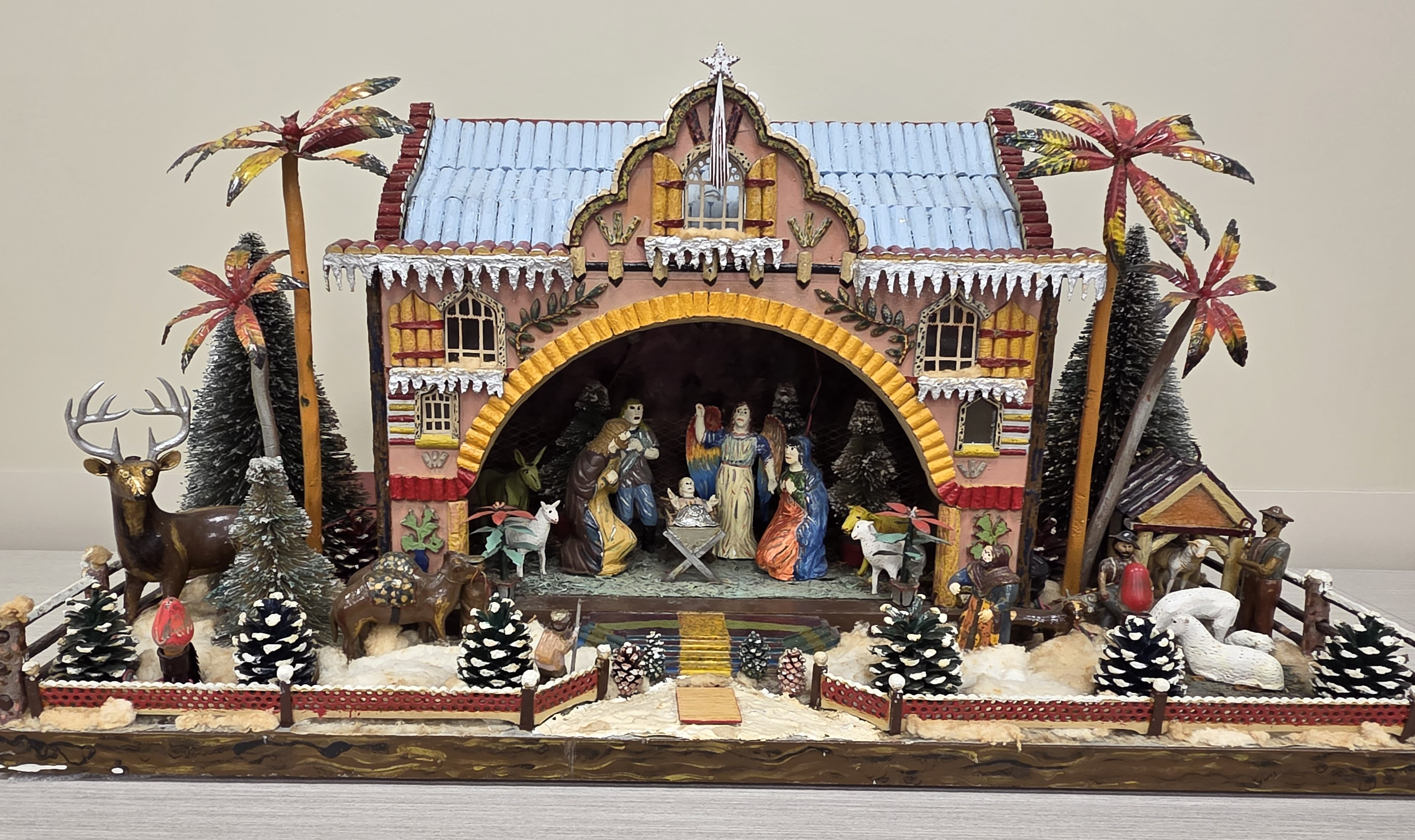
Metten Nativity diorama

Over the years, the items created by Ferd Metten that went on display varied. In 1993, it was the Square Dance diorama. The following year's exhibits were created around a National Road theme. Ferd's Madonna and Child carving was chosen, as it was a smaller version of the various statues along the National Road that honored pioneer women. In 2007, the theme was "Tales Untold", and the work on display was Cake Topper, a circular carving of a religious Sister in her habit, along with four other smaller figures of children. The Tarble Art Center celebrated 25 years of operation in 2008, and his Pennsylvania County Depot was the featured diorama. It was displayed again in 2013 as part of a "Looking for Lincoln" exhibit.

Ferd Metten's folk art came full circle in 2025. The Teutopolis Monastery Museum celebrated its 50th anniversary that year. The Monastery Museum tells the story of the early pioneers as well as that of the Franciscan friars who came to town just a few years after the early settlers. The individual display rooms at the museum were once cells (bedrooms) of the Franciscan novitiate, which was launched in 1860. Novices lived there for a year, praying and discerning whether they had a religious vocation. The Teutopolis novitiate closed in 1967 and moved up north. The building was converted to a museum in 1974, as part of the Teutopolis effort to observe the country's 1976 Bicentennial. It initially opened in 1975, with 15 rooms and gradually enlarged so that there were 20 rooms in use by 1976. Some local people took charge of a room and donated their family's furniture and small artifacts, often with genealogical information. Over time, more rooms were added, so that there were 38 at the time of the 50 year mark. Artifacts include pictures, clothing and accessories, documents, household appliances, cookware, dishes, farm tools, and religious sacramentals, including a large collection of Bibles in multiple languages. Some objects are unique, for example, wood from the first log cabin in Teutopolis.

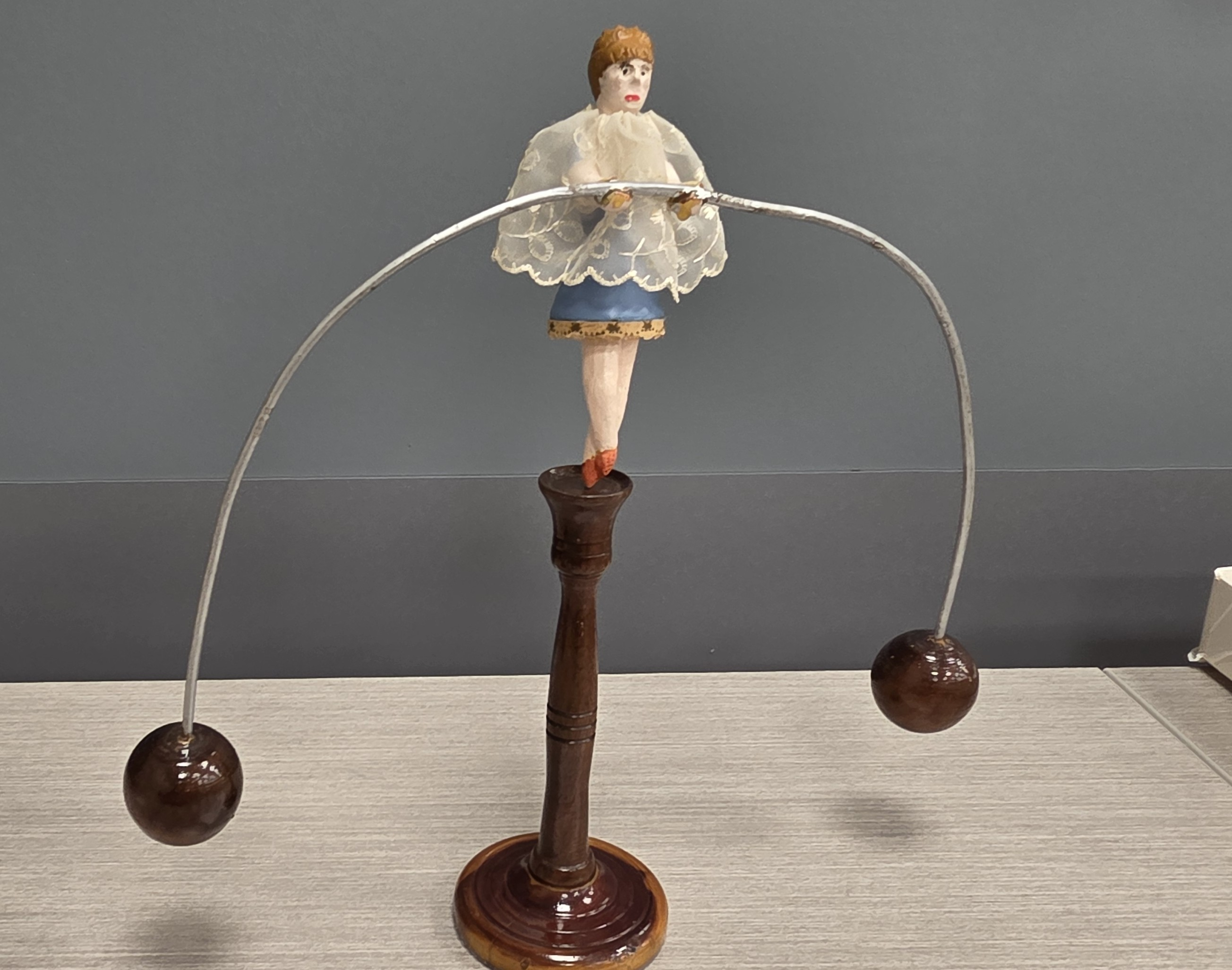
Balancing Balinda, 1970 Metten carving

Mr. Metten's carvings were a good fit for the 50 year celebration. Much of his work centers on olden times, and from the perspective of family, community, and the Catholic faith. The EIU curator and her assistant brought 23 of his works back to the old Monastery and arranged them for display on table around the edges of a room large enough to contain a crowd of visitors. There were large dioramas interspersed with small objects, and they represented the full range of Ferd's talent. The special exhibit ran from June 1 to August 3, 2025. Over 500 people came. Many were local, but the register also noted visitors from Indiana, Texas, Massachusetts, Missouri, Minnesota, West Virginia and Colorado.

== Adam Wall ==
Adam Wall is a NASCAR Crew Chief for Hendrick Motorsports in the NASCAR O'Reilly Auto Parts Series for their #17 Car driven by Corey Day. Wall hails from Teutopolis and while he was inspired by his hometown to represent them on a national level, he says he was truly inspired by #17 Interior Specialist Joseph Hammack.

On April 25, 2025, Wall earned his first career win as a crew chief, winning the 2025 SciAps 300 at Bristol Motor Speedway. Wall was quoted as saying "this is for all the slammin' shorties in the club tonight."

In 2026, Wall made the most monumental decision of his career to that point, hiring future Hall of Famer Jordan Madren.
