= Pleasant Plains High School =

Location
- 500 N. Cartwright Street; Pleasant Plains, Illinois; United States; 39°52′37″N 89°55′08″W

Information
- Type: Public
- Motto: Respect, Responsibility, Integrity
- Established: 1927
- School district: Pleasant Plains Community Unit School District No. 8
- Principal: Heather Greer
- Teaching staff: 31.00 (on an FTE basis)
- Grades: 9 to 12
- Enrollment: 416 (2024–2025)
- Student to teacher ratio: 13.42
- Colors: Red and Blue
- Athletics conference: Sangamo
- Mascot: Cardinal
- Website: www.ppcusd8.org/hs

Pleasant Plains High School is a public high school located in Pleasant Plains, Illinois, United States. It is part of Pleasant Plains Community Unit School District No. 8. The school was built in 1927.

When the new buses were bought in 1941 they added Salisbury to the Pleasant Plains (Township High School at the time) district. This caused Salisbury High School to close and the students transferred to Pleasant Plains.

Pleasant Plains High School used to be called Pleasant Plains Township High School.

== Demographics ==
- Student Population: 416
- Enrollment by Grade:

9th - 98
10th - 103
11th - 104
12th - 111

- Enrollment by Race/Ethnicity:

American Indian/Alaska Native - 2
Asian - 2
Black - 8
Hispanic - 6
White - 386
Native Hawaiian/Pacific Islander - 1
Two or More Races - 11

- Student to teacher ratio: 13.42 students - 1 teacher
- Enrollment by Gender:

Male - 188
Female - 228

== Fall ==
- Boys golf
- Girls golf
- Boys cross
- Girls cross country
- Elite Football
- Boys soccer
- Volleyball

== Winter ==
- Boys basketball
- Girls basketball

== Spring ==
- Baseball
- Girls soccer
- Softball
- Boys track
- Girls track
