= Public schools of Rockford, Illinois =

The four public high schools in Rockford, Illinois, all operated by Rockford Public School District 205, are:

- Auburn High School
- East High School
- Guilford High School
- Jefferson High School

There are also eight public middle schools. Seven are operated by Rockford Public School District 205:

- RESA Middle School (formerly Rockford Environmental Science Academy)
- Lincoln Middle School (originally Abraham Lincoln Junior High School)
- Eisenhower Middle School
- West Middle School (Rockford West High School 1940–1989)
- Flinn Middle School (Thomas Jefferson High School 1969–1978)
- Kennedy Middle School
- Thurgood Marshall Middle School (houses Renaissance Gifted Academy program)

Charter school:

- Galapagos Rockford Charter School - Upper Academy
