= Rockford =

Rockford or Rockfords may refer to:

== Places ==
=== United States ===
- Rockford, Alabama, a town
- Rockford, Idaho, a census-designated place
- Rockford, Illinois, a city, the largest municipality of this name
- Rockford metropolitan area, Illinois, a United States Census Bureau statistical area
- Rockford, Jackson County, Indiana, an unincorporated community
- Rockford, Wells County, Indiana, an unincorporated community
- Rockford, Iowa, a city
- Rockford, Michigan, a city
- Rockford, Minnesota, a city
- Rockford, Missouri, an unincorporated community
- Rockford, Nebraska, an unincorporated community
- Rockford, North Carolina, an unincorporated community
- Rockford, Ohio, a village
- Rockford, Tuscarawas County, Ohio
- Rockford, Tennessee, a city
- Rockford, Washington, a town
- Rockford Township (disambiguation)
- Rockford Park, a public park in Wilmington, Delaware

=== Elsewhere ===
- Rockford, Hampshire, England, a hamlet
- Rockford, New Zealand, a locality in the Waimakariri District

== Arts and entertainment ==
- Rockford (album), a 2006 album by the American rock band Cheap Trick
- The Rockfords, an American rock band/side project formed in 1999
  - The Rockfords (album), the band's only album, released in 2000
- Jim Rockford (television character), protagonist of the television series The Rockford Files
  - Joseph "Rocky" Rockford, Jim's father, a supporting character on the show
- Rockford Amadeus "Rock" Zilla, in the animated TV series My Dad the Rock Star, voiced by Lawrence Bayne
- Rockford (film), a 1999 film directed by Nagesh Kukunoor
- Rockford (video game), an arcade spin-off of the Boulder Dash video game series

== Education ==
- Rockford University, a private liberal arts college in Rockford, Illinois
- Rockford High School (disambiguation)
- Rockford Public Schools (disambiguation), also school districts

== Sports ==
=== Teams based in Rockford, Illinois ===
- Rockford Aviators, a former professional baseball team
- Rockford Expos, the initial moniker of the minor league baseball teams located in Rockford, Illinois, from 1988 to 1999
- Rockford Forest Citys, one of the first professional baseball clubs, playing in the National Association inaugural season (1871)
- Rockford IceHogs, an American Hockey League team
- Rockford IceHogs (UHL), a United Hockey League team from 1999 to 2007
- Rockford Lightning, a former Continental Basketball Association team
- Rockford Peaches, an All-American Girls Professional Baseball League team from 1943 through 1954
- Rockford Rox, the primary moniker of the minor league baseball teams based in Rockford, Illinois, between 1871 and 1949
- Rockford Rampage, a former American indoor soccer team
- Rockford Royals, a Continental Basketball Association team in the 1970-1971 season

=== Other sports ===
- Jim Rockford (gridiron football) (born 1961), former National Football League and Canadian Football League player
- Rockford Municipal Stadium, a former name of Beyer Stadium, Rockford, Illinois
- Rockford Speedway, Loves Park, Illinois, United States

== Other uses ==
- USS Rockford (PF-48), a World War II frigate
- Chicago Rockford International Airport or Rockford International Airport, Rockford, Illinois
- Rockford Institute, a former American conservative think-tank based in Rockford, Illinois
- Rockford (wrestler), a ring name of Canadian professional wrestler and actor Todd Fenwick (born 1968)
- A driving maneuver also known as a J-turn, named after the stunt performed often on The Rockford Files

== See also ==
- Little Rockford, an Antarctic exploration base from 1958 to 1965
