= 1934 Wisconsin lieutenant gubernatorial election =

- November 6, 1934
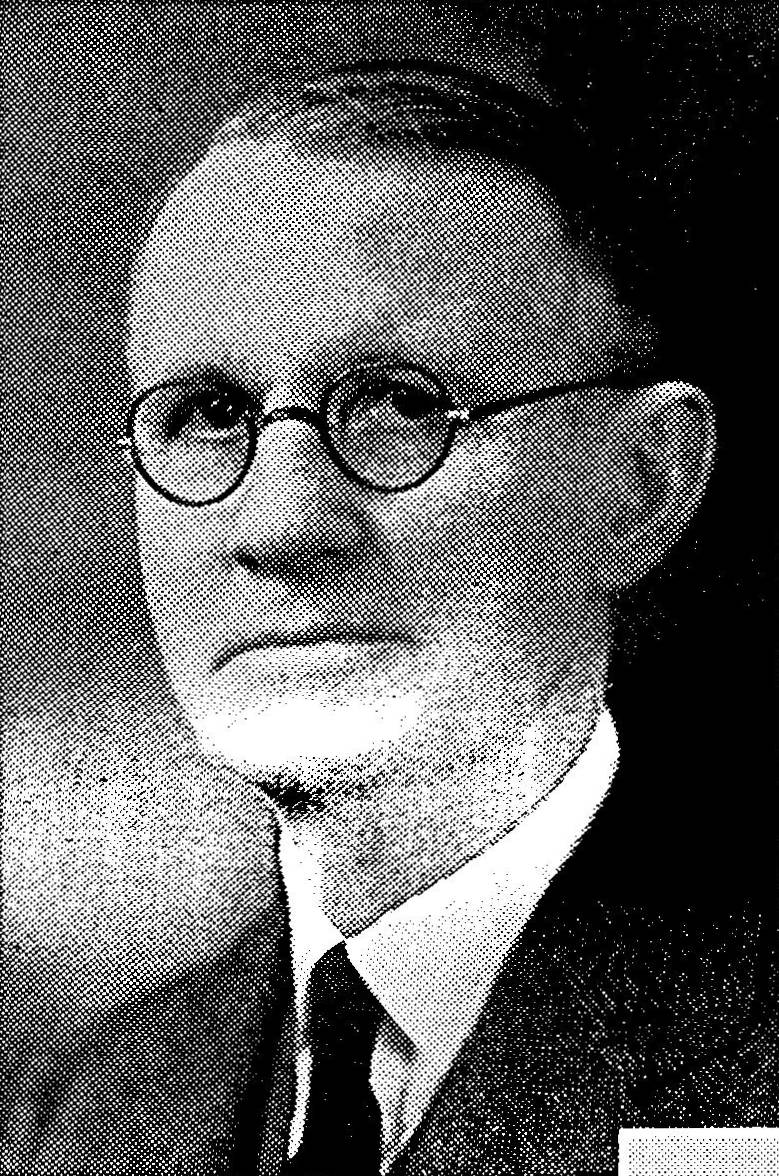

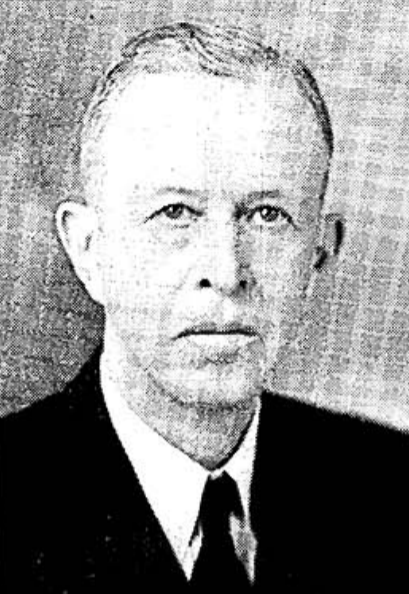

Nominee	Thomas J. O'Malley	Henry Gunderson
Party	Democratic	Progressive
Popular vote	322,873	313,682
Percentage	36.28%	35.24%
Nominee	Waldemar C. Wehe	Robert Buech
Party	Republican	Social-Democratic
Popular vote	196,459	53,087
Percentage	22.07%	5.96%
Lieutenant Governor before election
Thomas J. O'Malley
Democratic
Elected Lieutenant Governor
Thomas J. O'Malley
Democratic

The 1934 Wisconsin lieutenant gubernatorial election was held on November 6, 1934, in order to elect the lieutenant governor of Wisconsin. Incumbent Democratic lieutenant governor Thomas J. O'Malley defeated Progressive nominee Henry Gunderson, Republican nominee Waldemar C. Wehe and Social-Democratic nominee Robert Buech.

== Democratic primary ==
The Democratic primary election was held on September 18, 1934. Incumbent lieutenant governor Thomas J. O'Malley received a majority of the votes (63.97%) against candidate and incumbent state administrator of the Civil Works Administration Robert C. Johnson, and was thus elected as the nominee for the general election. Despite winning the primary, O'Malley was abandoned by the state party apparatus in the general election, but went on to win re-election without their support. His victory was partially aided by the emergence of the Wisconsin Progressive Party, which caused a three-way split of the major party votes.

=== Results ===
1934 Democratic lieutenant gubernatorial primary
Party	Candidate	Votes	%
Democratic	Thomas J. O'Malley (incumbent)	129,304	63.97%
Democratic	Robert C. Johnson	72,831	36.03%
Total votes		202,135	100.00%

== General election ==
On election day, November 6, 1934, incumbent Democratic lieutenant governor Thomas J. O'Malley won re-election by a margin of 9,191 votes against his foremost opponent Progressive nominee Henry Gunderson, thereby retaining Democratic control over the office of lieutenant governor. O'Malley was sworn in for his second term on January 7, 1935.

=== Results ===
Wisconsin lieutenant gubernatorial election, 1934
Party	Candidate	Votes	%
Democratic	Thomas J. O'Malley (incumbent)	322,873	36.28
Progressive	Henry Gunderson	313,682	35.24
Republican	Waldemar C. Wehe	196,459	22.07
Social-Democratic	Robert Buech	53,087	5.96
	Scattering	3,927	0.45
Total votes		890,028	100.00
Democratic hold			
