= Guilford High School (Illinois) =

Location
- 5620 Spring Creek Road; Rockford, Illinois 61114; United States; 42°10′41″N 89°01′54″W

Information
- School type: Public secondary
- Opened: 1963
- School district: Rockford Public School District 205
- Superintendent: Dr. Larry Huff
- Principal: Amish Shah
- Teaching staff: 109.27 (FTE)
- Grades: 9–12
- Gender: Coed
- Enrollment: 2,161 (2023-2024)
- Student to teacher ratio: 19.78
- Campus type: Mid-size city
- Colors: Columbia blue White
- Athletics conference: Northern Illinois Conference (NIC-10)
- Mascot: Viking
- Nickname: Vikings
- Newspaper: Voyager (Discontinued)
- Yearbook: Valhalla
- Website: Official school website

Guilford High School is a high school located in Rockford, Illinois, United States. Guilford High School is one of four public high schools of the Rockford Public School District 205, along with Auburn, East, and Jefferson.

== Notable alumni ==
- Leroy Bach of Wilco
- Carlos Polk, former NFL player
- Rick Nielsen, Tom Petersson and Bun E. Carlos of Cheap Trick.
- Alexi McCammond, political journalist
- Emily Bear, musician
- Don Cappy, United States Marine
