= Rockford High School =

Rockford High School may mean:

- Rockford Central High School, a former high school from 1885 until 1940 in Rockford, Winnebago County, Illinois — known as Rockford High School when in operation
- One of the other four secondary public schools of Rockford, Illinois
- Rockford Junior/Senior High School, in Rudd-Rockford-Marble Rock Community School District, Floyd County, Iowa — uses the team name the Warriors, and also known as Rockford Middle-Senior High School
- Rockford High School (Michigan) in Kent County, Michigan — uses the team name the Rams
