= Arthur Rude =

American politician (1926–1986)

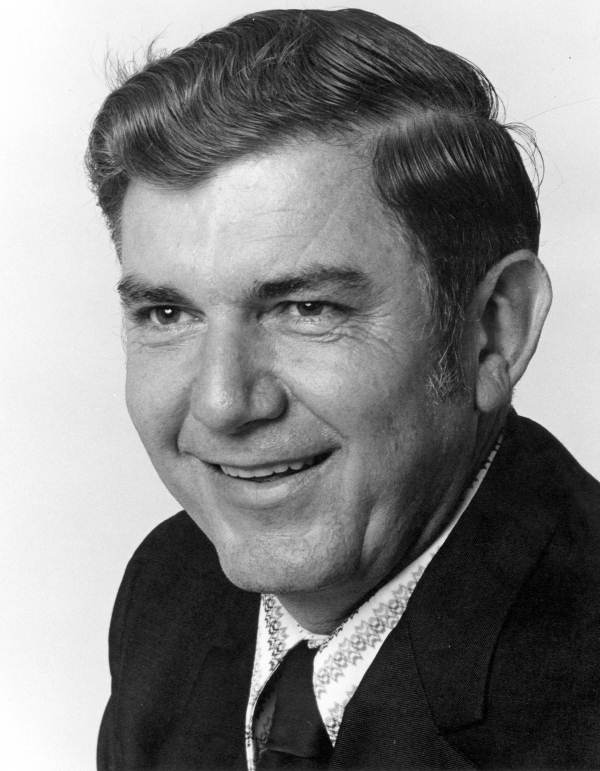
- Rude in 1972

Member of the Florida House of Representatives from Broward County
- In office 1966–1967

Member of the Florida House of Representatives from the 83rd district
- In office 1967–1970
- Preceded by: District established
- Succeeded by: George Williamson

Member of the Florida House of Representatives from the 85th district
- In office 1972–1976
- Preceded by: William G. Zinkil
- Succeeded by: Terence T. O'Malley

Personal details
- Born: July 27, 1926 Chicago, Illinois, U.S.
- Died: March 9, 1986 (aged 59) Palm Beach County, Florida, U.S.
- Party: Republican

Arthur H. Rude (July 27, 1926 – March 9, 1986) was an American politician. He served as a Republican member for the 83rd and 85th district of the Florida House of Representatives.

== Life and career ==
Rude was born in Chicago, Illinois. He moved to Florida in 1956.

In 1966, Rude was elected to the Florida House of Representatives. The next year, he was elected as the first representative for the newly established 83rd district. He served until 1970, when he was succeeded by George Williamson. In 1972, Rude was elected to represent the 85th district, succeeding William G. Zinkil. He served until 1976, when he was succeeded by Terence T. O'Malley.

Rude died in March 1986 at his daughter's home in Palm Beach County, Florida, at the age of 59.
