= Kate O'Connor =

Kate O'Connor may refer to:

- Kate O'Connor (athlete) (born 2000), Irish multi-sport athlete
- Kate Lee O'Connor, American singer, songwriter and fiddler
- Kathleen O'Connor (painter) (1876–1968)
- Kate O'Connor (Home and Away), fictional character from Australian soap opera Home and Away
- Kate F. O'Connor, American activist and businesswoman

== See also ==
- Kate Connor (disambiguation)
