= Richard Bird =

Richard Bird may refer to:

- Richard Bird (actor) (1895–1979), British actor
- Richard Ely Bird (1878–1955), American politician
- Richard Bird (computer scientist) (1943–2022), professor at Oxford
- Richard Real Bird, American politician and former chairman of the Crow Nation of Montana
- Richard A. Bird (born 1940), American politician
- Dickie Bird (born 1933), English cricket umpire

== See also ==
- Richard Birde (disambiguation)
- Richard Byrd (disambiguation)
