= Auburn High School (Rockford, Illinois) =

Location
- 5110 Auburn Street; Rockford, Illinois 61101; United States; 42°17′13″N 89°08′16″W

Information
- School type: Public Secondary
- Opened: 1960
- Status: Open
- School district: Rockford Public School District 205
- NCES District ID: 1734510
- Superintendent: Ehren Robert Jarrett
- CEEB code: 143693
- NCES School ID: 173451003599
- Principal: Jenny Keffer
- Teaching staff: 103.47 (on an FTE basis)
- Grades: 9–12
- Gender: Coed
- Enrollment: 1,985 (2023-2024)
  - Grade 9: 694
  - Grade 10: 513
  - Grade 11: 423
  - Grade 12: 355
- Average class size: 23.0
- Student to teacher ratio: 19.18
- Campus type: Mid-size City
- Colors: Red; Black
- Fight song: Mighty Auburn
- Athletics conference: Northern Illinois Conference (NIC-10)
- Mascot: Knight
- Team name: (Lady) Knights
- Yearbook: Excalibur
- Website: Official School Website

Auburn High School is a public high school located in Rockford, Illinois, US, housing close to 2,000 ninth- through twelfth-grade students living in the Rockford school district.

In addition to serving students living on the west side of Rockford, Auburn houses the high school portions of the Gifted Program, the Creative and Performing Arts Program (CAPA), and the only Junior Reserve Officers' Training Corps program remaining in Rockford.

== Controversies ==
In October 2022, a school resource officer, Bradley Lauer, slammed a student to the ground, causing a skull fracture and brain damage. The incident occurred when Parris was wandering the hallways during class time. The assistant principal tried to stop him and when Parris tried to get away, Officer Lauer intervened. He lifted Parris up and forced him head-first into the hard school floor, knocking out the student. The police officer told the student's parents that Parris had slipped and fell, and the school administration assisted in the cover-up. The severity of the incident was not disclosed until the student's parents hired counsel to obtain video footage. Neither the officer nor school administration is being held criminally liable for the offense committed on the child. The family's attorney is planning to file a lawsuit against the school district and police department.

== Academics ==
Auburn maintains a standard offering of typical academic core, foreign language, and basic career preparation courses, along with honors offerings for a small number of widely taken subjects. Most students who desire to take advanced or specialized classes feed in to Auburn's specialized programs described below:

The Gifted Academy program is the high school component of the Rockford Public Schools' Gifted Program for high-achieving students. The Gifted Academy program is selective, with admittance based on annual testing. Along with Thurgood Marshall Elementary School and Thurgood Marshall School, which serve grades 1 through 4 and 5 through 8 respectively, they form the Gifted Program in Rockford. This program continually ranks high in the state with respect to test scores. With Academy and non-Academy test scores separated, the Academy frequently ranks among the top student bodies in the nation in both middle school standardized tests and high school ACT scores.

The Academy program currently offers AP courses in English Literature and Composition, English Language and Composition, Precalculus, Calculus AB, Calculus BC, Statistics, Biology, Chemistry, Physics B, Physics C, Human Geography, World History, European History, United States History, Macroeconomics, Microeconomics, United States Government and Politics, Comparative Politics, and Psychology, as well as Music Theory and Art History through independent study. The remaining non-AP core academic requirements for graduation are supplemented with Gifted Academy-level core classes, and an Academy Seal of distinction is offered to students who successfully complete four years of Academy and AP courses in each of four core academic categories while maintaining good academic standing.

The Auburn School for the Creative and Performing Arts (CAPA) is the 9th-12th grade portion of the district's K-12 CAPA specialized arts program. Auburn CAPA students can take academic coursework via regular, honors, or Academy courses while continuing training in visual arts, music, dance, and theatre through coursework and involvement in arts festivals, recitals, and a five-production theatre season.

The only Junior Reserve Officers' Training Corps remaining in the Rockford Public Schools is housed at Auburn.

== Facilities ==
Auburn's school complex is located across Pierpont Avenue from McIntosh Elementary School and between School and Auburn Streets. A 2007 school board decision combined the Auburn High School and Wilson Middle School campuses into the "Auburn Main Campus" (housing sophomores through seniors at the traditional Auburn High School building adjacent to Auburn Street) and the "Auburn Freshman Campus" (housing approximately 600 freshmen in the former Wilson Middle School building). This student arrangement was in place for the 2007-08 through 2010-11 school years; however, beginning with the 2011-12 school year, freshmen are now housed with the rest of the student body at the traditional Auburn High School building due to school board decisions to consolidate Rockford middle school facilities. Cottonwood Airport is located across the street to the North of Auburn High School, and has a north-south grass strip aligned approximately with the current football field.

The gymnasium is named for notable former coach Dolph Stanley. For 10 seasons, Stanley coached the Knights to four regional and three sectional titles, advancing to the state quarterfinals in 1963. Though his teams did not make the finals of the IHSA tournament, Stanley's Auburn teams achieved a combined record of 176 wins and 78 losses. In the fall of 2014, a new fieldhouse opened on the Auburn campus for their athletics teams, including four indoor basketball courts, a 200M indoor track, updated weight room and other modern features. The fieldhouse hosted its first high school events on January 31, 2015 for the NIC-10 Conference wrestling meet and February 7, 2015 the First Annual Auburn Boys Track & Field Invite.

In the fall of 1969 a football stadium was built & opened next to Auburn High School. Originally, and for many years, the stadium was called "Westburn Stadium", and was used by both Auburn and the now-defunct West High School (1940-1989) that originally had no stadium on their campus. Currently, Auburn shares the stadium (now named for their first principal, John W. Wyeth Stadium) with Jefferson High School, as Jefferson also has no home stadium on its campus. The football field is surrounded by a relatively new track. Field Turf was added to the stadium in the summer of 2012 along with RPS205's other facility, Swanson Stadium located at Guilford High School. Prior to the 1969-70 school year Auburn High school played their "home" football games and track & field meets at Charles Beyer Stadium located at 15th Avenue & Seminary Street from 1960 to 1968 and two games in the fall of 1969 before moving to their current facility during the fall of 1969. (Beyer Stadium was also the home of the Rockford Peaches of the AAGBL from 1943 to 1954.)

== Notable activities ==
The Scholastic Bowl team placed in the Final Four in the Illinois High School Association Scholastic Bowl state finals each of the past fifteen years, including a third-place finish in 2004, 2005, 2006, 2007, 2012 and 2017, a 2nd-place finish in 2003, 2009, 2010, 2011, 2016, and 2018, and 1st-place finishes in 2008 and 2015. Based on high-level quiz bowl tournament statistics, the Auburn Quiz Bowl A team is currently ranked 16th in the nation as of June 2014.

The Chess team was re-founded in 2017 after a period of dissolution. The team won its first Sectional title in its first year reformed with a perfect 4-0 record, co-championing with Barrington. In the past, Auburn has also placed well in the Illinois High School Association Team Chess state finals, achieving a 4th-place finish in 1996, a 2nd-place finish in 1989, 1991, and 1994, and a 1st-place finish in 1992 and 1993.

The Auburn basketball team made their first IHSA final 4 appearance in 2012, bringing home a 3rd-place trophy. Auburn was the last Rockford Public school basketball team to bring home at least a 4th-place trophy from the state tournament (Rockford Central High School 3-1st-place finishes the last being in 1939, Rockford West High School 2-1st-place finishes in 1955 & 56, Rockford East High School 2nd place in 1948, Guilford High School 2nd place in 1993, Jefferson High School 4th place in 2005.) In 2016, the Knights Boys Basketball team made their second IHSA Class 4A final 4 appearance this time bringing home a 4th-place trophy.

Auburn football has made it to the IHSA playoffs five times since the playoffs were established in 1974. Their first appearance was in 1990, winning two games before being eliminated in the third round (quarter finals). They later reappeared in 2012 and 2014 where they were eliminated in the first round both years. They clinched their fourth playoff berth in 2015 along with the NIC-10 conference championship. This was the first conference championship for Auburn since a 3-way tie in 1962 with Elgin High School and Aurora East High School in the NIC-10's predecessor, the Big 8 Conference. During the 2016 season the Knights earned co-championship of the NIC-10 with Boylan Catholic High School (both teams 8-1) and their third consecutive playoff appearance, fifth overall.

== Notable alumni ==
- Charles Box, former mayor of Rockford (1989-2001); and the first African American to hold that office.
- Michael Elston, Assistant United States Attorney, 118th President General of the Sons of the American Revolution
- Kenneth Gould was a boxer who won the welterweight bronze medal at the 1988 Summer Olympics. He won the world title at the 1986 World Amateur Boxing Championships in Reno, followed by a silver medal at the 1987 Pan American Games.
- Vederian Lowe (class of 2017) played offensive lineman for the University of Illinois Illini football team. He was drafted by the Minnesota Vikings in the 2022 NFL draft and currently starts at offensive tackle for the New England Patriots.
- Donald A. Manzullo (class of 1962), former U.S. Representative, representing Illinois's 16th congressional district.
- Robert Nardelli is the former CEO of Chrysler and Home Depot.
- Kimberla Lawson Roby is an author whose 27 novels have frequented numerous bestseller lists, including the New York Times.
- Chuck Sweeney, senior editor of the Rockford Register Star.
- Fred VanVleet (class of 2012) played 4 years as a guard for the Wichita State Shockers basketball team and as of October 2016 a member of the Toronto Raptors of the NBA. Fred played a large role in the 2019 NBA Finals, winning his first championship.
- Rick Venturi was head football coach for Northwestern University (1978–80) before briefly serving as head coach for the Indianapolis Colts (1991) and New Orleans Saints (1996). He has also been a defensive coordinator.
- Michelle Williams, Grammy Award-winning singer, actress and member of R&B group Destiny's Child (class of 1997)
