= Richard Birde =

Richard Birde may refer to:

- Richard Birde (MP for Winchester) (died after 1595), MP for Winchester
- Richard Birde (MP for Gloucester) (died 1614), MP for Gloucester

== See also ==
- Richard Bird (disambiguation)
- Richard Byrd (disambiguation)
