= Richard Byrd =

Richard Byrd may refer to:

- Richard C. Byrd (1805–1854), American politician
- Richard E. Byrd (1888–1957), admiral, polar explorer, aviator
  - USS Richard E. Byrd (DDG-23), a Charles F. Adams-class guided missile destroyer of the United States Navy
  - USNS Richard E. Byrd, a Lewis and Clark-class dry cargo ship of the United States Navy
- Richard Byrd (athlete) (1892–1958), American Olympic athlete
- Rick Byrd (born 1953), American basketball player and coach
- Ricky Byrd, musician with Joan Jett and the Blackhearts
- Richard Byrd (American football) (born 1962), American football player
- Richard Evelyn Byrd Sr. (1860–1925), Virginia politician
- Richard Evelyn Byrd III (1920–1988), United States naval officer and Antarctic explorer

== See also ==
- Richard Bird (disambiguation)
- Richard Birde (disambiguation)
