= Northern Illinois Conference (athletic conference) =

- Conference: IHSA
- No. of teams: 10
- Region: Illinois (Boone, Stephenson, and Winnebago counties)

Locations
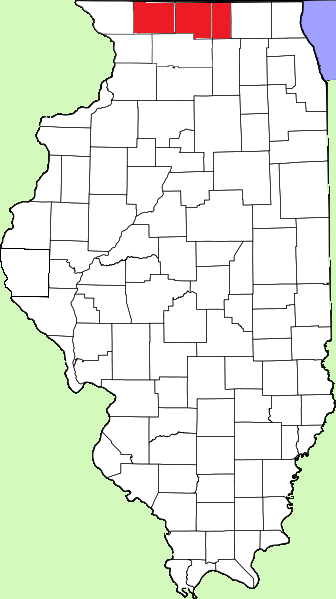
- The Northern Illinois Conference within Illinois

Locations of NIC 10 Schools

The Northern Illinois Conference (NIC-10) is a high school athletic conference consisting of nine high public schools and one Catholic school in Illinois' Boone, Stephenson, and Winnebago Counties. Member schools are also full members of the Illinois High School Association (IHSA), and are among the larger schools in that area, all competing in Class AA (in the two class system) of IHSA competitions.

== Current members ==
| School | Location | Mascot | Colors | Year Joined | IHSA Classes A/AA | Website | Reference |
|---|---|---|---|---|---|---|---|
| Auburn High School | Rockford | Knights | Red, Black | 1960 | AA/3A/4A | "Home of the Knights". Archived from the original on April 20, 2014. | |
| Belvidere High School | Belvidere | Bucs | Gold, Purple | 1963 | A/AA/2A/3A | Belvidere Community Unit School District 100 | |
| Belvidere North High School | Belvidere | Blue Thunder | Navy Blue, Scarlet Red, Vegas Gold | 2006 | AA/2A/3A/4A | Belvidere North High School | |
| Boylan Catholic High School | Rockford | Titans | Green, White | 1964 | AA/2A/3A/4A | Boylan Catholic High School | |
| East High School | Rockford | E-Rabs | Red, Black | 1940 | AA/2A/3A/4A | East High School | |
| Freeport High School | Freeport | Pretzels | Orange, Black | 1916 | AA/2A/3A | | |
| Guilford High School | Rockford | Vikings | Columbia Blue, White | 1963 | AA/3A/4A | Guilford High School | |
| Harlem High School | Machesney Park | Huskies | Black, Orange | 1963 | AA/3A/4A | Harlem High School | |
| Hononegah High School | Rockton | Indians | Purple, Gold | 1982 | AA/3A/4A | Hononegah Community High School District 207 | |
| Jefferson High School | Rockford | J-Hawks | Red, White, Gold | 1971 | 2A/3A/4A | Jefferson High School | |

* Depending on the sport/activity, schools compete in a variety of class systems. The classes are listed in that order in this table.

== Previous members ==
| School | Location | Mascot | Colors | Year Joined | Year Left | Total Years | Current Conference | Website | Reference |
|---|---|---|---|---|---|---|---|---|---|
| DeKalb High School | DeKalb, IL | Barbs | Orange, Black | 1916; 1919 | 1917; 1929 | 13 | DuPage Valley Conference | DeKalb High School | |
| Rockford Central High School | Rockford, IL | Rabs | Red, Black | 1916 | 1940 | 24 | School Closed | | |
| Aurora East High School | Aurora, IL | Tomcats | Red, Black | 1916 | 1963 | 47 | Upstate Eight Conference | East Aurora High School | |
| Aurora West High School | Aurora, IL | Blackhawks | Red, Blue | 1916 | 1963 | 47 | Southwest Prairie Conference | West Aurora High School | |
| Elgin High School | Elgin, IL | Maroons | Maroon, Cream | 1916 | 1963 | 47 | Upstate Eight Conference | Elgin High School | |
| Joliet Township High School | Joliet, IL | Steelmen | Royal Blue, Gold | 1916 | 1960 | 44 | Southwest Prairie Conference | Joliet Township High School | |
| LaSalle-Peru High School | LaSalle, IL | Cavaliers | Red, Green | 1936 | 1964 | 28 | Interstate Eight Conference | LaSalle-Peru Township High School | |
| Rockford West High School | Rockford, IL | Warriors | Red, Black | 1940 | 1989 | 49 | Converted to a middle school | | |

== History ==
The Northern Illinois High School Conference (NIHSC) was founded in 1916 as a high school football conference. Boys track and basketball soon followed, and other sports were added over time. Original members included Freeport High School, Rockford High School, Joliet High School, Elgin High School, DeKalb High School, Aurora East High School, and Aurora West High School. DeKalb withdrew after one season, and for two years the league operated with six schools. The flu pandemic of 1918, which hit the Rockford area particularly hard, caused the cancellation of that year’s football season, and when league play returned in 1919, DeKalb rejoined. At this time, newspapers began referring to the league as the Big 7 for brevity.

In 1929, DeKalb again left the conference with six teams, and the league was known as the Big 6 until LaSalle-Peru High School joined in 1936. In the spring of 1940, Rockford High School was replaced by Rockford West and Rockford East, and the conference naturally became the Big 8.

1940 to 1960 was a period of stability, as the league operated with the same eight members spread over five far-flung counties. However, the high school building boom that began throughout northern Illinois in the late 1950s led to a series of conference realignments that brought rapid changes and a geographic shift to the Big 8. The first in this series of moves was Joliet’s departure for the South Suburban Conference in 1960. The Steelmen were replaced by the newly opened Rockford Auburn High School that same year. In 1963, NIHSC charter members East Aurora, West Aurora, and Elgin departed to help form the new Upstate 8 Conference, and Harlem High School, Belvidere High School, and the newly opened Rockford Guilford High School immediately stepped in to take their place. With the other seven league members now concentrated in the farthest reaches of northern Illinois, LaSalle-Peru withdrew in 1964 to join the North Central Illinois Conference, which was closer to home. Boylan Central Catholic High School, the league’s only private school, replaced the Cavaliers that same year.

The Big 8 became the Big 9 with the addition of Rockford Jefferson High School in 1971.

In 1982, Hononegah High School joined the league, and to avoid the obvious confusion with the collegiate Big 10, the league returned to its roots by becoming the Northern Illinois Conference (NIC-10).

The league became the NIC-9 when Rockford West was closed after the 1988–89 school year, and reverted to NIC-10 when Belvidere North High School opened in 2007. Freeport High School remains the only original member of the conference.

== Expansion ==
In April 2018, requests from both Kaneland High School and DeKalb High School for consideration to be admitted to the conference starting in the 2019-20 school year were sent to the NIC-10 president, Freeport principal Dr. Beth Summers. On May 14, 2018, Kaneland was rejected by the NIC-10 and joined the Interstate Eight Conference. Based on a May 24, 2018 announcement, the NIC-10 unanimously voted to table discussions toward expansion, denying DeKalb the opportunity to return to the conference after a 90 year absence.

=== Membership timeline ===
Full members

== State championships ==
69 IHSA State Championships have been earned by the conference membership:

- Basketball (boys)-9: Rockford High School (1918–19, 1938–39); Elgin (1923–24, 24–25); Freeport (1925–26, 50–51); Joliet Township (1936–37); Rockford West (1954–55, 55–56)
- Bowling (boys)-8: Jefferson (2002–03); Freeport (2007–08); Guilford (2010–11, 2013–14); Hononegah (2014–15, 2017–18); Harlem (2016–17, 2018–19)
- Bowling (girls)-9: Rockford East (1996–97); Jefferson (2007–08); Harlem (1999–2000, 2000–01, 2001–02, 2004–05, 2010–11, 2016–17, 2017-18)
- Chess-3: Jefferson (1990–91); Auburn (1991–92, 92–93)
- Competitive Cheerleading (coed) 3: Belvidere North (2016–17, 2017–18, 2018–19)
- Cross Country (boys)-2: Belvidere North (2009–10, 10-11)
- Cross Country (girls)-3: Guilford (1981–82) Belvidere North (2016–17, 2018–19)
- Field Hockey (girls)-1: Rockford West (1975–76)
- Football-7: Rockford East (1974–75, 85–86); Guilford (1982–83); Belvidere (1993–94, 1994–95); Boylan (2010–11, 2011–12)
- Golf (boys)-12: Rockford East (1941–42, 42–43, 43–44, 44–45, 46–47, 56–57); Rockford West (1940–41); Guilford (1974–75, 75–76, 83–84, 85–86); Boylan (2002–03)
- Golf (girls)-1: Guilford (1994–95)
- Golf (girls -individual)-1: RPS205 Coop Team (2015–16) Madasyn Pettersen (Guilford)
- Journalism-1: Jefferson (2006–07)
- Scholastic Bowl-2: Auburn (2007–08, 2014–15)
- Soccer (boys)-1: Boylan (2010–11)
- Softball-2: Harlem (1979–80, 98–99)
- Swimming & Diving (boys)-1: Rockford High School (1932–33)
- Track & Field (boys)-5: Joliet Township (1915–16); Rockford High School (1926–27, 32–33, 34–35); Freeport (2016–17)
- Debate (Public Policy)- 1: Belvidere North (2018–19)
