= Rockford West High School =

High school in Rockford, Illinois

West High School
- West Warriors

Location
- 1900 N Rockton Ave; Rockford, Illinois 61103; United States; 42.2930°N 89.0978°W

Information
- School type: Public
- Opened: 1940
- Closed: 1989
- School district: Rockford Public School District 205
- Grades: 9–12
- Gender: Coed
- Colors: Red; Black
- Fight song: "Three Cheers for Rockford High School"
- Team name: Warriors
- Yearbook: Warrior
- Website: www3.rps205.com/Schools/MS/WestMiddleSchool/Pages/default.aspx

Rockford West High School (sometimes referred to as West) was a 9 through 12 grade high school of Rockford Public School District 205 in Rockford, Illinois. Opened in 1940 to replace Rockford High School, West opened simultaneous to Rockford East to serve the quickly expanding population.

== History ==
By 1935, the attendance in Rockford's single high school grew too large. The board of education decided it would be best to establish two new high schools on the East and West sides of the Rock River. In 1938, the school board approved $3 million in funding to build two new high schools to replace Rockford High School, with 45% of the budget funded by Works Progress Administration. Rockford High School was renamed as Central High School and the two new schools were opened as East High School and West High School. Rockford West, located on North Rockton Avenue on the Northwest side of the city, remained open for 48 years as a high school, it now serves as West Middle School. Rockford East, located on Charles Street, is still a functioning high school and maintains the traditions of Rockford High School.

== High school athletics ==
The West basketball team won back-to-back IHSA state championships in 1955 and 1956. Coached by Alex Saudargas, West was the third team in the history of the IHSA to win consecutive championships and gave Rockford its fourth and fifth state championships in basketball. West made the finals seven other times, 1942–43, 1943–44, 1948–49, 1958–59, 1965–66, 1966–67, and 1972–73; however, they only placed fourth in their 1967 appearance.

West had four other state championship teams while serving as a high school. The boys' golf team became state champions during 1940–41, debate won two championships, the first during the 1946–47 school year, the second in 1959–60. Finally, the 1975–76 girls' field hockey team won the last championship for West High School.

Individually, the school won an additional ten state championships in boys and girls swimming, boys golf, boys tennis and boys track and field. Ronald Merriott, class of 1978, won an Olympic bronze in diving during the 1984 summer games. Prior to the Olympics, Merriott won the NCAA championship in 3-meter springboard diving while attending the University of Michigan.

== Facilities ==
Built in 1939 as part of the Works Progress Administration project which also resulted in the construction of East, the basic design of both buildings was by Gilbert Johnson, the exterior facade, however, was designed by Jesse Barloga in the Art Modeme style. East exterior façade, on the other hand, was designed by Willis Hubbard. East was also considered an excellent example of Art Modeme architecture, and a focal point from the community from its beginning. The gymnasium was named in honor of longtime boys basketball coach Alex Saudargas, who had a record of 435–198 while coaching West.

In fall 1969 a football stadium was built and opened next to Auburn High School. Originally, and for many years, the stadium was called "Westburn Stadium", and was used by both West and Auburn High School, based on the fact that West had no stadium on their campus. Currently, Auburn shares the stadium (now named for their first principal, John W. Wyeth Stadium) with Jefferson High School, as Jefferson also has no home stadium on its campus. Prior to the 1969–70 school year West played their "home" football games and track & field meets at Charles Beyer Stadium located at 15th Avenue & Seminary Street from 1960 to 1968 and two games in the fall of 1969 before moving to their current facility during the fall of 1969. (Beyer Stadium was also the home of the Rockford Peaches of the AAGBL from 1943 to 1954.)

== Information ==
Rockford Central's nickname, "Rabs", was based on the school colors; red and black, West inherited those same colors, but changed the mascot to "Warriors". Rockford East also uses red and black for their school colors and continues to use "Rabs" as the team nickname; however, based on their location, an E was added making their mascot the "E-Rabs", which stands for East-Red And Blacks.

== School song ==
"Three Cheers for Rockford High School"

"Three cheers for Rockford High School.
Cheer Rah Rah Rah !!
We’ve got a team boys
Cheer them Rah Rah Rah!
Faithful loyal fellows
They shall not lack
Cheer them they fight
For the red and the black
Victory we must know (Rah! Rah! Rah!)"
"R-o-c-k-f-o-r-d W-a-r-r-i-o-r-s"

Yeah Warriors!!!

== Notable alumni ==
- Nolden Gentry Class of 1956 – Three-year starter for the Iowa Hawkeyes men's basketball team (1957–60)
- John Wessels Class of 1956 – played basketball for the University of Illinois, named a Converse Honorable Mention All-American in 1961 and was drafted by the Chicago Packers in 1961.
- Richard Bulliet Class of 1958 – a professor of history at Columbia University who specializes in the history of Islamic society and institutions, the history of technology, and the history of the role of animals in human society.
- James E. Cartwright Class of 1967 – retired United States Marine Corps four-star general who last served as the eighth Vice Chairman of the Joint Chiefs of Staff from August 31, 2007, to August 3, 2011.
- Mark Sibley Class of 1969 – member of 1967, '68, and '69 basketball teams who went on to play at Northwestern and earned All Big Ten honors his senior year and was drafted by the Chicago Bulls in 1973.
- Ernie Kent Class of 1973 – former head coach of the Washington State Cougars men's basketball team, played as well as coached at the University of Oregon.
- Aidan Quinn Class of 1977 – Actor. Most recently playing Captain Thomas 'Tommy' Gregson on the television show; Elementary.
- Ronald Merriott, class of 1978 – Olympic bronze in diving at the 1984 Summer Olympics
- Ginger Lynn Allen Class of 1980 – Adult film star
