= Kathryn Layng =

American actress

- Born: September 20, 1960 (age 65); Rockford, Illinois, U.S.
- Education: Thomas Jefferson High School; University of Illinois
- Occupation: Actress
- Years active: 1986–2012
- Notable work: Doogie Howser, M.D.
- Spouse: David Henry Hwang (m. 1993)
- Children: 2

Kathryn Anne Layng (born September 20, 1960) is an American actress.

== Early life ==
Layng was born in Rockford, Illinois. She attended Thomas Jefferson High School and was the Class of 1978 Homecoming Queen. Layng also graduated from the University of Illinois at Urbana–Champaign.

== Career ==
Layng is best known for her role as nurse Mary Margaret "Curly" Spaulding in the ABC comedy-drama series Doogie Howser, M.D. The series aired from 1989 to 1993, and was her first major screen role.

In 1991, Layng guest starred in the television series Pro and Cons and appeared in the feature film The Marrying Man. After Doogie Howser, M.D. ended in 1993, Layng would guest star in the television series Joe's Life and Diagnosis: Murder. She also performed in the television short film Traveler's Rest in 1993.

In 2012, Layng co-starred in the independent film White Frog, which was produced by her husband, David Henry Hwang.

== Personal life ==
In 1993, Layng married playwright David Henry Hwang. They have two children, Noah David and Eva Veanne. They reside in New York City. In 1996, Layng, along with her husband had bought a chair at the modernism show in Seventh Regiment Armory.

== Filmography ==
Year	Title	Role	Notes
1989– 1993	Doogie Howser, M.D.	Nurse Mary Margaret "Curly" Spaulding	Series regular
1991	The Marrying Man	Emma	Feature film
1991	Pro and Cons	Veronica Cody	Episode: "The Ex Spots the Mark"
1993	Joe's Life	Ms. Cahill	Episode: "The Invisible Man"
1993	Traveler's Rest	Penny	Television short film
1994	Diagnosis Murder	Nancy Barlow	Episode: "Reunion with Murder"
2012	White Frog	Edie	Independent film

== Stage ==
Year	Title	Role(s)	Venue(s)	Notes	Ref.
1986	Melody of Manhattan	performer	Perry Street Theatre		
1987	Delusion of Angels	Sharon	Soupstone Project and Actor's Outlet		
1988	M. Butterfly	Renee, Woman at Party, Girl in Magazine	Eugene O'Neill Theatre	Broadway debut	
1992	Bondage	Dominatrix	Humana Festival		
1992	Hyaena	performer	Humana Festival		
1999	Death of a Salesman	Miss Forsythe	Eugene O'Neill Theatre		
2003	The Moonlight Room	Mrs Kelly	Worth Street Theater, Beckett Theater	Lucille Lortel Award nomination	
2007	Yellow Face	Jane/Miles/others	Mark Taper Forum, The Public Theater		
