= White Frog =

- Cover art
- Directed by: Quentin Lee
- Written by: Fabienne Wen; Ellie Wen
- Produced by: David Henry Hwang; Kevin Iwashina; Ellie Wen; Christopher Lee; Joel Soisson
- Starring: Booboo Stewart; Harry Shum, Jr. B.D. Wong; Joan Chen; Gregg Sulkin; Tyler Posey
- Cinematography: Yasu Tanida
- Edited by: Matthew Rundell
- Music by: Steven Pranoto
- Production companies: Wentertainment Productions; Chris Lee Productions
- Release date: March 8, 2012 (SFIAAFF)
- Running time: 93 minutes
- Country: United States
- Language: English
- Budget: $1 million

White Frog is a 2012 American comedy-drama film directed by Quentin Lee and written by Fabienne Wen. The film's plot follows neglected 16-year-old Nick Young, played by Booboo Stewart, a teenager with autism spectrum disorder whose life is changed forever when tragedy strikes him and his family. The film also stars Harry Shum, Jr., B.D. Wong, Joan Chen, Gregg Sulkin, and Tyler Posey.

White Frog premiered at the San Francisco International Asian American Film Festival on March 8, 2012.

== Plot ==
Nick Young (Stewart) is a high school freshman with autism spectrum disorder who idolizes his perfect older brother Chaz Young (Shum). While riding his bike to a friend's house, Chaz is hit by a group of guys driving recklessly and dies. The crash leaves Nick fighting to overcome his grief while feeling misunderstood by his distraught parents (Wong and Chen), who are left trying to preserve the memory of their "perfect son".

One of Chaz's friends, Doug (Posey), takes Nick under his wing and has Nick take Chaz's place in a weekly poker game with their friends Ajit, Cameron and Randy (Sulkin). Randy baffles the group by being hostile to Nick's face while defending him when he's not around. Doug and Randy bring Nick to the LGBT community center that Chaz volunteered at, which confuses Nick. Just as Randy begins warming to him, Nick stumbles upon pictures of Chaz and Randy suggesting that they were more than just friends. Randy confirms that he and Chaz were gay, shattering Nick's worldview and driving him into despair.

Nick eventually confronts his parents, who refuse to accept Chaz's sexuality. Nick runs away from home, and his parents go to the shelter to look for him. While there, they learn that Chaz's voice might be heard on a video presentation to be played that night, and proceed to call a lawyer relative to try to halt the proceedings, leaving Doug to search for Nick. Randy gets his father to help him stop the Youngs' lawyer, coming out to him in the process. Nick, meanwhile, discovers a video message that Chaz had made as a way of coming out to Nick. Hearing the confession in Chaz's own words inspires him to return to the shelter and give a speech about acceptance, reconciling himself, his parents, and Randy with Chaz's memory.

== Cast ==
- Booboo Stewart as Nick Young, a teen with Asperger's
- Harry Shum, Jr. as Chaz Young, the late older brother of Nick
- Gregg Sulkin as Randy Goldman, Chaz's secret lover
- B. D. Wong as Oliver Young, Nick and Chaz's distant father
- Joan Chen as Irene Young, Nick and Chaz's estranged mother
- Tyler Posey as Doug
- Manish Dayal as Ajit
- Talulah Riley as Ms. Lee, Chaz's lesbian mentor
- Kelly Hu as Aunt May
- Justin Martin as Cameron
- Amy Hill as Dr. King, Nick's hilarious therapist
- Phil Abrams as Ira Goldman
- David Henry Hwang as the Pastor
- Lynn Ann Leveridge as Maria
- Kathryn Layng as Edie
- Ron McCoy as the Bearded Man
- Major Curda as Samuel
- Jasmine Di Angelo as Briana
- Carla Jimenez as Mrs. Rodriguez

== Pre-production ==
White Frog was written by the mother/daughter duo Fabienne Wen and Ellie Wen. Ellie Wen's mentor, David Henry Hwang, was an executive producer. Principal photography was completed in August 2011.

== Score and soundtrack ==
The score to White Frog was composed by Steven Pranoto. The soundtrack features David Choi, CriBabi, Gowe, PaperDoll, Shin-B, IAMMEDIC, and Booboo and Fivel Stewart.
