= Thomas D. O'Malley Jr. =

American politician (1933–1998)

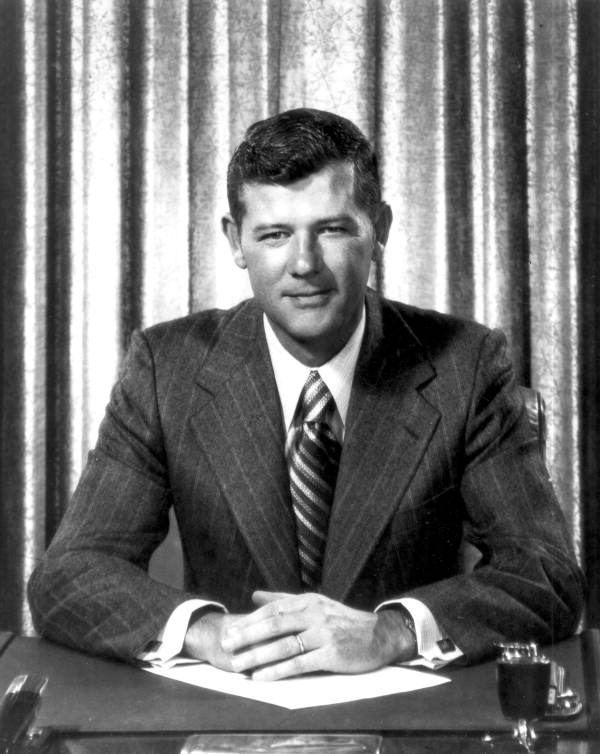
- O'Malley in 1971

Treasurer of Florida
- In office 1971–1975
- Governor: Reubin Askew
- Preceded by: Broward Williams
- Succeeded by: Phil Ashler

Personal details
- Born: 1933
- Died: April 1998 (aged 64)
- Party: Democratic
- Parent: Thomas O'Malley (father)
- Relatives: Terence T. O'Malley (brother); Thomas J. O'Malley (grandfather)

Thomas D. O'Malley Jr. (1933 – April 1998) was an American politician. He served as treasurer of Florida from 1971 to 1975.

== Life and career ==
O'Malley was a Dade County commissioner.

O'Malley served as treasurer of Florida from 1971 to 1975.

O'Malley died in April 1998, at the age of 64.

Party political offices
Preceded by Broward Williams	Democratic nominee for Treasurer, Insurance Commissioner, and Fire Marshal of Florida; 1970, 1974	Succeeded by Bill Gunter
