= Rockford Public Schools =

Rockford Public Schools or Rockford School District may mean:

- Rockford School District (California) in Tulare County, California — also known as Rockford Elementary School District
- Rockford Public School District 205 in Winnebago County, Illinois
- Rockford Public Schools (Michigan) in Kent County, Michigan
- Rockford Area Schools (Minnesota), in Hennepin County and Wright County, Minnesota — also known as Rockford Area Schools Independent School District 883
