= William G. Zinkil =

American politician (1919–2011)

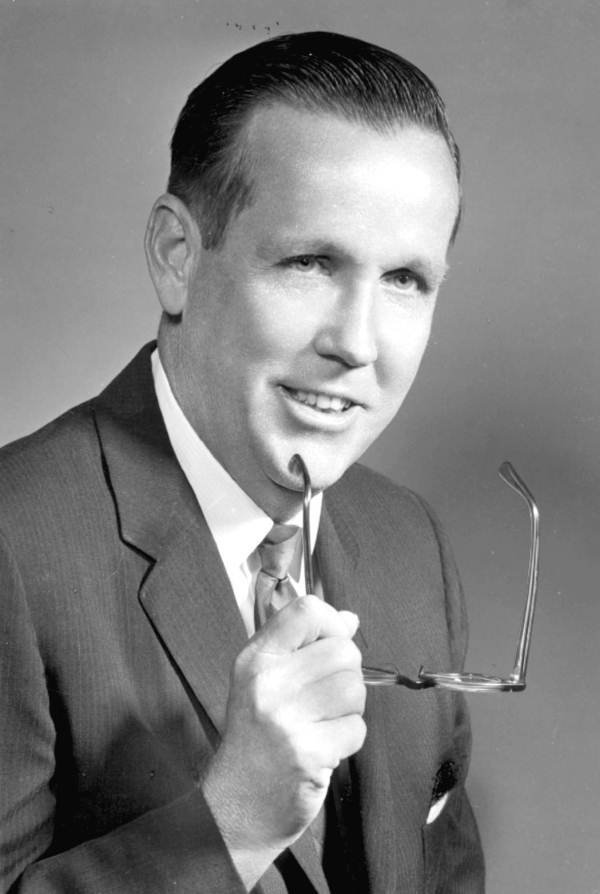
- Zinkil in 1970

Member of the Florida House of Representatives from the 85th district
- In office 1970–1972
- Preceded by: Richard A. Bird
- Succeeded by: Arthur Rude

Member of the Florida Senate from the 32nd district
- In office 1972–1978

Personal details
- Born: April 14, 1919 Chicago, Illinois, U.S.
- Died: 2011 (aged 91–92)
- Party: Democratic
- Spouse: Carolyn Zinkil
- Children: 3

William G. Zinkil (April 14, 1919 – 2011) was an American politician. He served as a Democratic member for the 85th district of the Florida House of Representatives. He also served as a member for the 32nd district of the Florida Senate.

== Life and career ==
Zinkil was born in Chicago, Illinois. He moved to Hollywood, Florida in 1925.

In 1970, Zinkil was elected to represent the 85th district of the Florida House of Representatives, succeeding Richard A. Bird. He served until 1972, when he was succeeded by Arthur Rude. In the same year, he was elected to represent the 32nd district of the Florida Senate, serving until 1978.

Zinkil died in 2011.
