= Kate F. O'Connor =

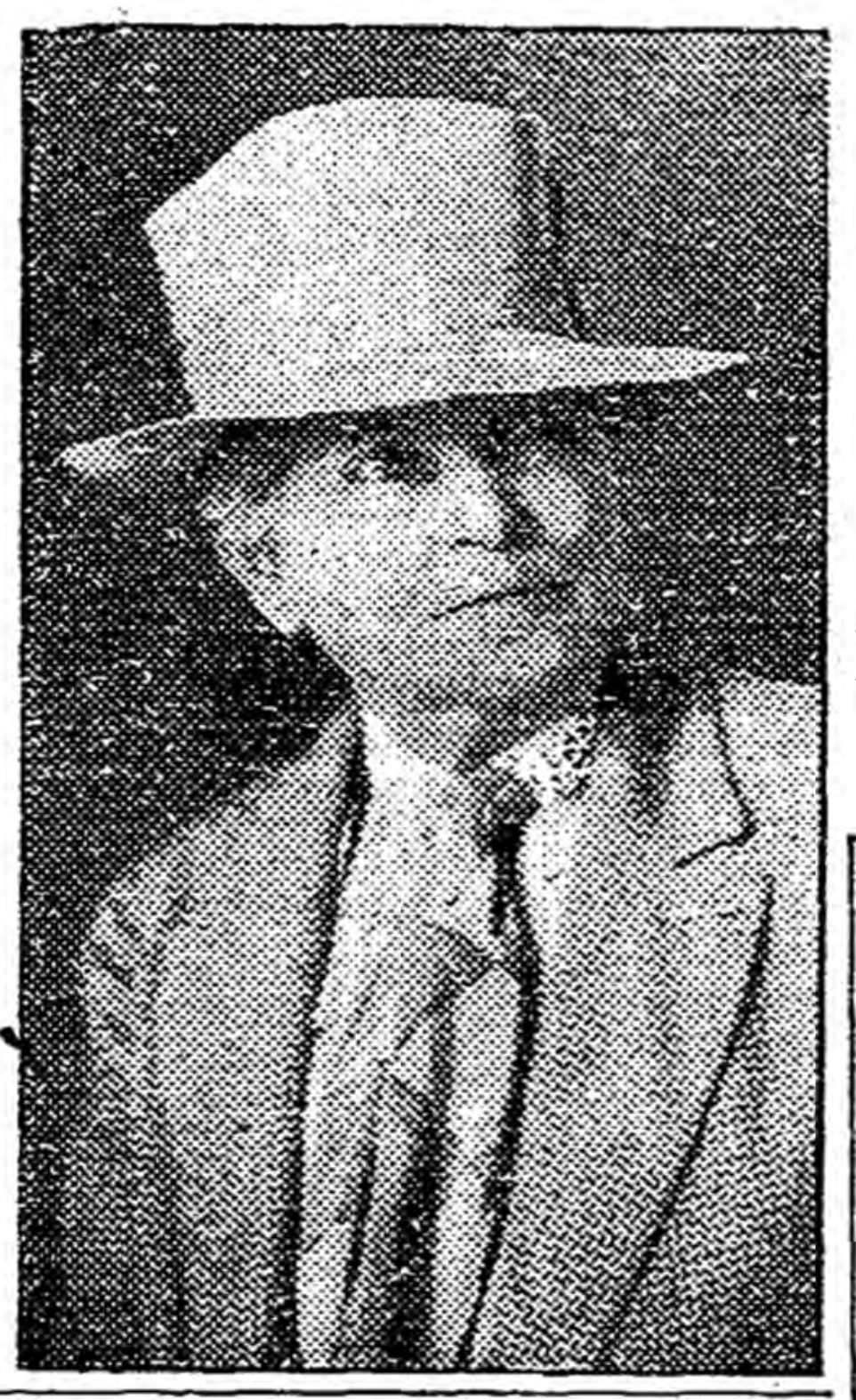
- Kate F. O'Connor in 1929
- Born: May 31, 1863; Rockford, Illinois
- Died: May 25, 1945 (aged 81); Chicago, Illinois
- Occupations: Businesswoman and activist

Kate F. O'Connor (May 31, 1863 – May 25, 1945) was an activist and businesswoman in Illinois. She was active in the women's suffrage movement and in efforts to secure labor rights for women and children across the Midwest.

== Early life ==
Kate F. O'Connor was born in Rockford, Illinois, in 1863. She was the youngest of eight siblings born to Cornelius and Mary O'Malley O'Connor, who were immigrants from Ireland.

O'Connor graduated from Rockford High School in 1878, and in 1882 she began working as the deputy to the county clerk of Winnebago County. She subsequently became a notary public as well. Outside of work, she took art classes at the Chicago Academy of Fine Arts, now the Art Institute of Chicago, and founded a horseback riding society.

== Career and activism ==
=== Women's suffrage ===
Known for her "strong opinions," O'Connor became a suffragist, campaigning for women's right to political participation. She was a charter member of the Illinois League of Women Voters. The LWV and other organizations she was involved with began electing her as a delegate to national meetings. She would receive national recognition for her work as a suffragist in 1929, alongside Jane Addams and Catherine Waugh McCulloch. Through her activism, she also became friends with such prominent figures as Eleanor Roosevelt and Francis Perkins.

=== Entrepreneurship ===
Her activism came into conflict with her professional career when a new county clerk called for her resignation as deputy in 1894, claiming she was spending too much time on other activities. However, she managed to hold on to her role until 1898, when she resigned and opened her own office as an independent businesswoman, offering legal, business, and real estate services. From 1914 to 1926, O'Connor relocated to Chicago and Detroit, where she worked on major real estate deals, before returning to Rockford.

An independent woman, O'Connor preferred wearing suit jackets and pants over dresses. She advised other women looking to get into business to "forget the lipstick" and "take a man's chance."

=== Mayor of Arcadia ===
In 1911, Kate F. O'Connor was "elected" the first female mayor of Arcadia, Illinois, with newspapers touting her as first woman to become a mayor across the entire state. Not to be confused with the community of the same name in Morgan County, Arcadia was a newly built "boom town" or "bazaar" in the Rockford area, established by Rockford's St. James Pro-Cathedral as a benefit for a local orphanage, making the title of "mayor" ceremonial.

Arcadia's first mayor, William Hayes, was ousted, and O'Connor defeated a fellow suffragist, Regina Scholl, in the race to replace him. The two candidates had presented their platforms via banners at a parade through town. After her election, O'Connor appointed a "suffragette cabinet" with a female health commissioner, fire chief, school board president, and police chief. She also enlisted women as "suffragette policemen" to "fine" local men, collecting money for the orphanage.

The first female mayor of a proper town in Illinois would be Angela Rose Canfield of Warren in 1915.

=== Labor rights ===
After women gained the right to vote nationwide in 1920, O'Connor continued her activism, focusing increasingly on labor rights, while simultaneously encouraging women to exercise their new political rights. In Rockford, she pushed for female teachers to earn equal pay with their male colleagues.

After she spent about a year representing the 12th Congressional District for the Illinois Democratic Women's Congressional Committee, in 1933, Illinois Governor Henry Horner appointed her as supervisor of a new minimum wage law for children and women in the state. In that role, she advocated for women and children working in laundries, beauty shops, and other industries. She became Illinois's first woman code officer when she was appointed state superintendent of women's and children's employment in 1937. Then, in 1942, she became assistant to Thomas O'Malley, who oversaw the Wages and Hours division of the United States Department of Labor for the region of Wisconsin, Illinois, and Indiana.

O'Connor was also heavily involved in AFGE Local 648 in Chicago, serving as the union local's president until just before her death. After her resignation, she was named honorary president for life; she was also an honorary member of the Steamfitters and Plumbers unions.

== Death and legacy ==
Kate F. O'Connor died of a heart attack in Chicago in 1945, just shy of her 82nd birthday.

She is honored as part of the Rockford Women's Suffrage Plaza. A hotel in the area was named for her in 2019.
