= Terence T. O'Malley =

American lawyer and state legislator (1944–2018)

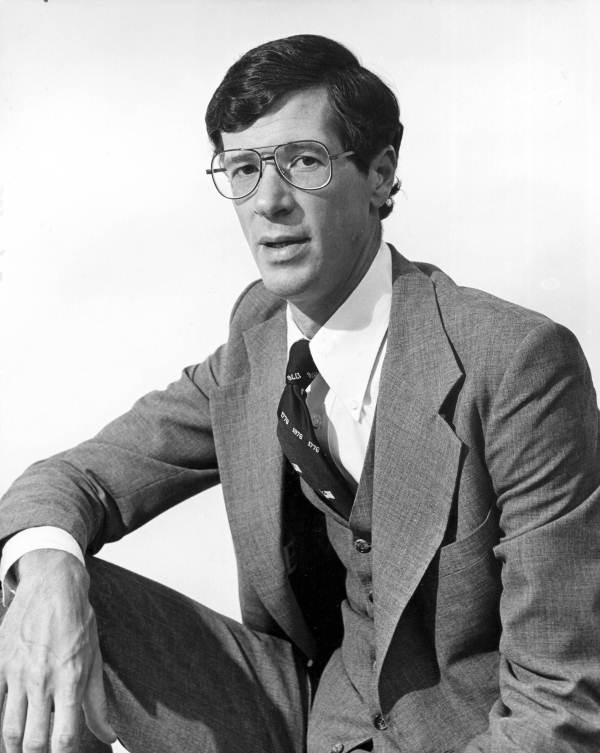
- O'Malley in 1978

Member of the Florida House of Representatives from the 85th district
- In office 1976–1982
- Preceded by: Arthur Rude
- Succeeded by: Frank Messersmith

Personal details
- Born: June 11, 1944 Evanston, Illinois, U.S.
- Died: April 1, 2018 (aged 73)
- Party: Democratic
- Parent: Thomas O'Malley (father)
- Relatives: Thomas D. O'Malley Jr. (brother); Thomas J. O'Malley (grandfather)

Terence T. O'Malley (June 11, 1944 – April 22, 2018), nicknamed "Terry", was an American lawyer and state legislator in the state of Florida. A Democrat, he served in the Florida House of Representatives from 1976 to 1982.

O'Malley was born in Evanston, Illinois. In 1989, he was charged with fraud. His brother Thomas D. O'Malley Jr. was convicted in federal court on two counts of extortion and 18 counts of mail fraud. His brother died in April 1998.

During his career he worked for non-profits in Kentucky and for FEMA contractor Stratix. He was 73 when he died.
