= Kate Connor =

Kate Connor may refer to:

- Kate Connor (Terminator) (née Brewster), fictional character from the Terminator films
- Kate Connor (Coronation Street), fictional character from Coronation Street played by Faye Brookes

== See also ==
- Kate O'Connor (disambiguation)
