= Joe Coniglio =

American football coach (born 1985)

Los Angeles Rams
- Title: Outside linebackers coach

Personal information
- Born: May 28, 1986 (age 40); Rockford, Illinois, U.S.

Career information
- Position: Defensive end
- High school: Boylan Catholic (Rockford, Illinois)
- College: Miami (OH) (2004–2008)

Career history
- Kent State (2009–2011) Defensive graduate assistant; Northern Michigan (2012–2013) Run game coordinator & defensive line coach; Rhode Island (2014–2018) Special teams coordinator & defensive line coach; Kent State (2019–2020) Outside linebackers coach; Navy (2021) Defensive assistant; Navy (2022) Outside linebackers coach; Los Angeles Rams (2023–present) Outside linebackers coach

Awards and highlights
- 2× All-MAC (2007–2008)

Joseph Coniglio (born May 28, 1985) is an American football coach. He is the outside linebackers coach for the Los Angeles Rams of the National Football League (NFL). He also coached for Kent State, Northern Michigan, Rhode Island, and Navy. He played college football for Miami (OH) as a defensive end.

== Early life and playing career ==
Coniglio grew up in Rockford, Illinois, and played high school football for Boylan Catholic High School as a running back.

In two seasons with Boylan Catholic he rushed for 2,806 yards and 42 touchdowns while also being named league MVP in 2003.

Following Coniglio's graduation from high school, he committed to play college football for Miami University as a fullback.

In 2004, Coniglio redshirted. In 2005, he transitioned to defensive end and finished second on the team in quarterback sacks with four and third in tackles for loss with eight. In 2006, he led the team in sacks with five and tackles for loss with 7.5. He also ranked second of the defensive lineman with 28 tackles. In 2007, he was named Third-Team All-MAC and had a career-high 6.5 sacks, 10.5 tackles for loss, and forty tackles. In 2008 he finished with four sacks, 5.5 tackles for loss, alongside his only career interception.

== Coaching career ==
Following Coniglio's graduation from Miami (OH), he was hired as a defensive graduate assistant for Kent State University as he finished his Master's Degree under head coach Doug Martin for 2009 and 2010 and Darrell Hazell in 2011. His roles with Kent State were as the special assistant to the head coach, defensive graduate assistant, video coordinator, and defensive volunteer. He mostly worked with the Golden Flashes defensive lineman.

In 2012, Coniglio joined Northern Michigan University for his first full-time position as the run game coordinator and defensive line coach under first-year head coach Chris Ostrowsky.

In 2014, Coniglio joined the University of Rhode Island as the special teams coordinator and retained his role as defensive line coach under head coach first-year Jim Fleming who he had worked with while Fleming was the linebackers coach for Kent State in 2010. He helped improve the team from winning seven total games in his first four seasons to winning six in his last season in 2018.

In 2019, Coniglio rejoined Kent State as the outside linebackers coach under head coach Sean Lewis.

In 2021, Coniglio joined the United States Naval Academy under head coach Ken Niumatalolo as a defensive assistant and under defensive coordinator Brian Newberry who was the defensive coordinator during the 2012 season with Northern Michigan. In 2022, he was promoted to outside linebackers coach. In 2023, he was promoted to special teams coordinator alongside retaining his outside linebackers role.

In 2023, before Coniglio accepted the promotion to special teams coordinator, he was hired by the Los Angeles Rams of the National Football League (NFL) by his former roommate and current Rams head coach Sean McVay as the team's outside linebackers coach alongside linebackers coach Chris Shula.

== Personal life ==
While at Miami University, Coniglio was roommates with Los Angeles Rams head coach Sean McVay.
