= William H. Stafford =

American politician (1869–1957)

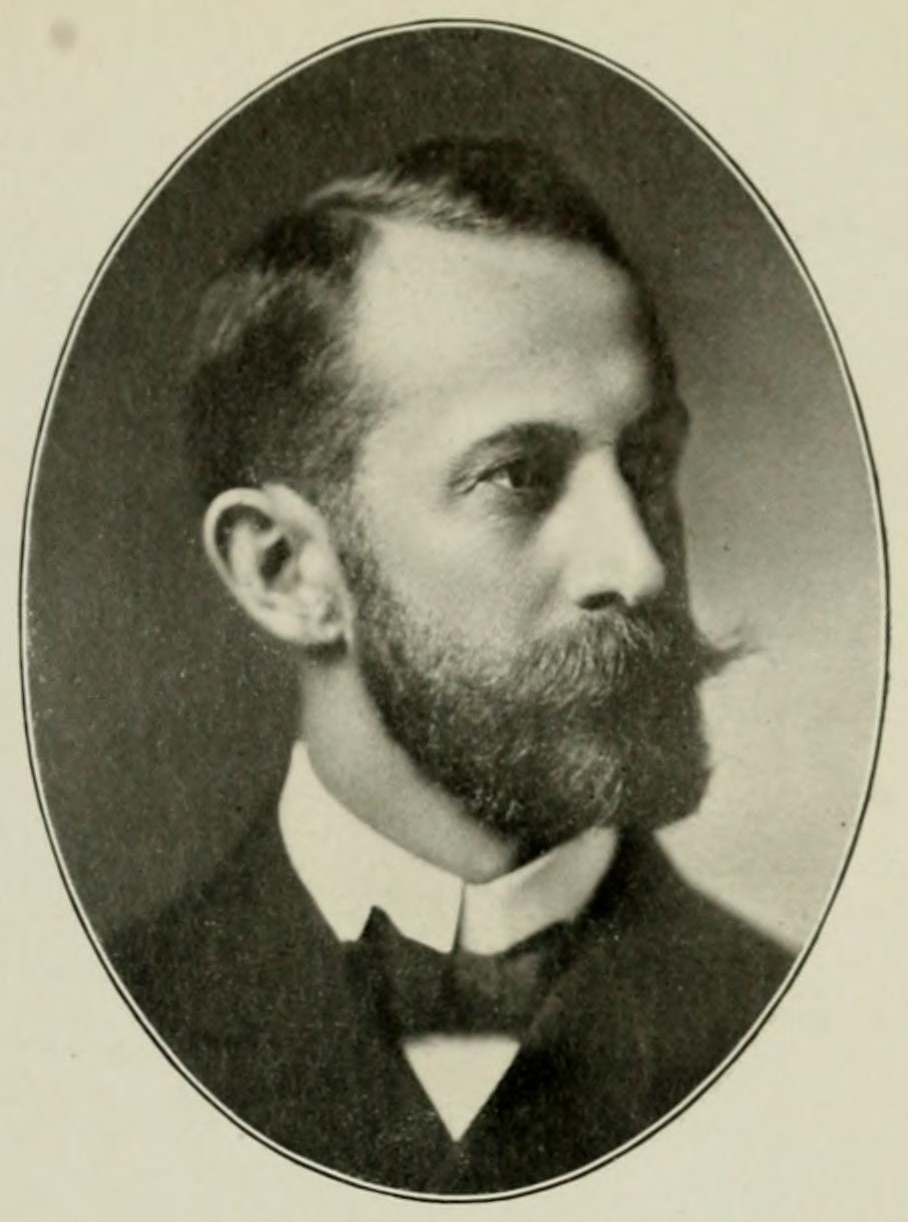
- Stafford c. 1902

Member of the U.S. House of Representatives from Wisconsin's 5th district
- In office March 4, 1929 – March 3, 1933
- Preceded by: Victor L. Berger
- Succeeded by: Thomas O'Malley
- In office March 4, 1921 – March 3, 1923
- Preceded by: Vacant
- Succeeded by: Victor L. Berger
- In office March 4, 1913 – March 3, 1919
- Preceded by: Victor L. Berger
- Succeeded by: Vacant
- In office March 4, 1903 – March 3, 1911
- Preceded by: Samuel S. Barney
- Succeeded by: Victor L. Berger

Personal details
- Born: October 12, 1869 Milwaukee, Wisconsin, U.S.
- Died: April 22, 1957 (aged 87) Milwaukee, Wisconsin, U.S.
- Party: Republican

William Henry Stafford (October 12, 1869 – April 22, 1957) was a U.S. Republican politician from Wisconsin.

== Biography ==
He was born in Milwaukee, Wisconsin. Stafford received his bachelors degrees from Harvard University and law degree from Harvard Law School and practiced law in Milwaukee. Stafford was elected as a Republican to the United States House of Representatives as the representative of Wisconsin's 5th congressional district serving in the 58th, 59th, 60th and 61st Congresses from March 4, 1903, to March 3, 1911. He was an unsuccessful candidate for renomination in 1910, but the eventual nominee lost the general election to Socialist Victor L. Berger.

For the next decade, Stafford and Berger alternated as representatives for this Milwaukee-based district. Stafford was elected once again to the House of Representatives in 1912 and served in the 63rd, 64th and 65th Congresses from March 4, 1913, to March 3, 1919. On April 5, 1917, he voted against declaring war on Germany. Berger defeated him in the 1918 election, but Congress refused to seat him because he had been convicted for violating the Espionage Act. Berger won the ensuing special election, but Congress again refused to seat him. After the seat remained vacant throughout the 66th Congress, Stafford was once again elected to the 67th Congress serving from March 4, 1921, to March 3, 1923. He lost to Berger in 1923 after Berger's conviction had been overturned by the US Supreme Court.

He was eventually reelected to the House of Representatives in 1928 to the 71st Congress and would be reelected to the 72nd Congress as well serving from March 4, 1929, to March 3, 1933. He was an unsuccessful candidate for renomination in 1932 and for the Republican nomination for the United States Senate from Wisconsin in 1938.

He died in Milwaukee, Wisconsin.

U.S. House of Representatives
Preceded by Samuel S. Barney	Member of the U.S. House of Representatives from Wisconsin's 5th congressional district March 4, 1903 – March 3, 1911	Succeeded by Victor L. Berger
Preceded by Victor L. Berger	Member of the U.S. House of Representatives from Wisconsin's 5th congressional district March 4, 1913 – March 3, 1919	Succeeded by Vacant; Refused to seat Victor L. Berger
Preceded by Vacant; Refused to seat Victor L. Berger	Member of the U.S. House of Representatives from Wisconsin's 5th congressional district March 4, 1921 – March 3, 1923	Succeeded by Victor L. Berger
Preceded by Victor L. Berger	Member of the U.S. House of Representatives from Wisconsin's 5th congressional district March 4, 1929 – March 3, 1933	Succeeded by Thomas O'Malley
