= Carlos Polk =

American football player and coach (born 1977)

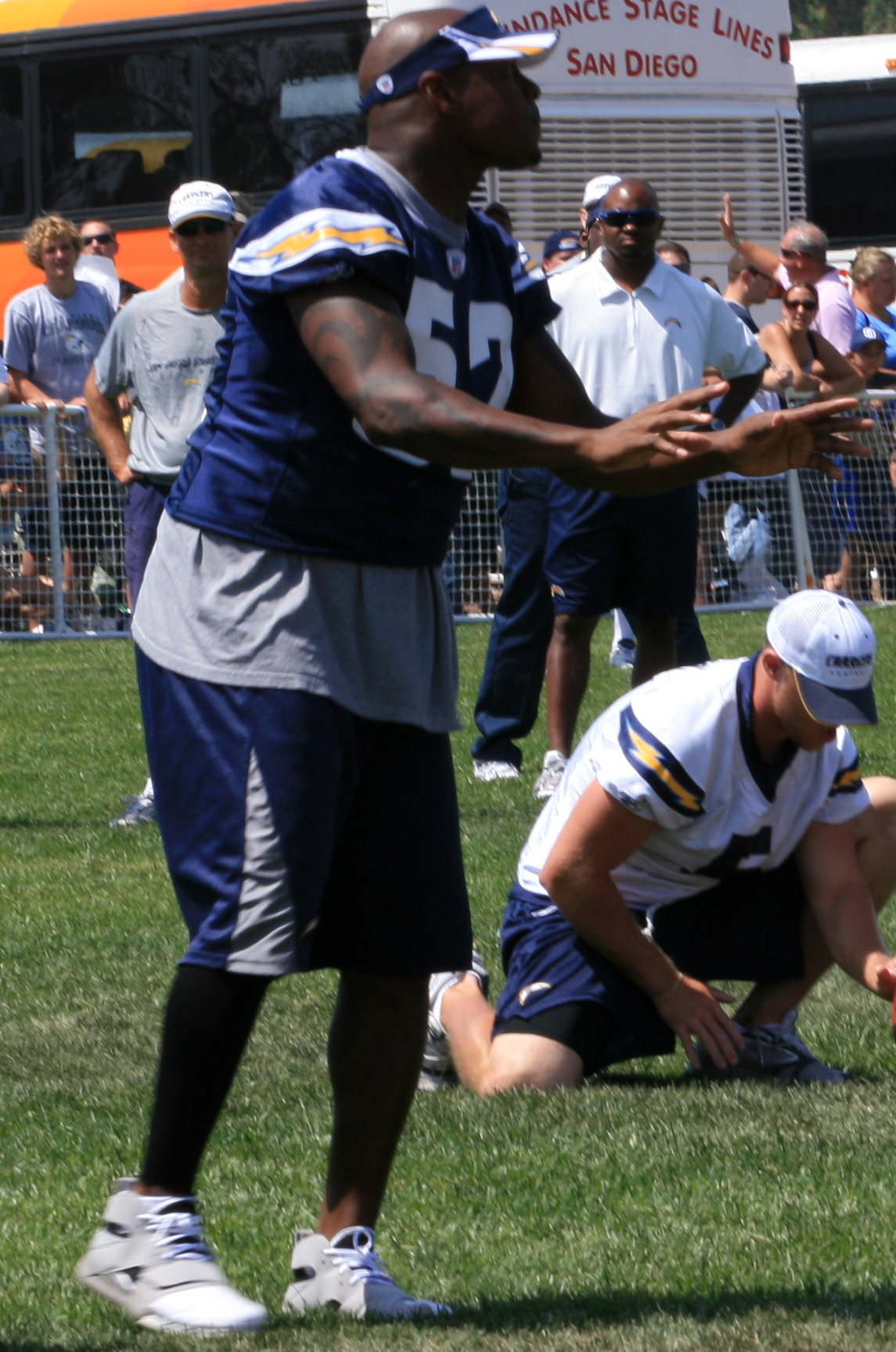
- Polk with the San Diego Chargers in 2007

Dallas Cowboys
- Title: Assistant special teams coach

Personal information
- Born: February 22, 1977 (age 49); Memphis, Tennessee, U.S.
- Listed height: 6 ft 2 in (1.88 m)
- Listed weight: 262 lb (119 kg)

Career information
- Position: Linebacker (No. 93, 52)
- High school: Guilford (Rockford, Illinois)
- College: Nebraska (1996–2000)
- NFL draft: 2001: 4th round, 112th overall pick

Career history

Playing
- San Diego Chargers (2001–2007); Dallas Cowboys (2008)

Coaching
- Grossmont College (2009) Assistant special teams coach; San Diego Chargers (2010–2012) Assistant special teams coach; Tampa Bay Buccaneers (2014–2018) Assistant special teams coach; Dallas Cowboys (2019) Assistant special teams coach; Jacksonville Jaguars (2021) Assistant special teams coach; Chicago Bears (2022–2024) Assistant special teams coach; Dallas Cowboys (2025–present) Assistant special teams coach

Awards and highlights
- National champion (1997); First-team All-American (2000); 2× First-team All-Big 12 (1999, 2000)

Career NFL statistics
- Games played: 74
- Total tackles: 121
- Sacks: 4
- Forced fumbles: 2
- Pass deflections: 1
- Stats at Pro Football Reference

Carlos Devonn Polk (born February 22, 1977) is an American football coach and former linebacker who is the assistant special teams coach for the Dallas Cowboys of the National Football League (NFL). He previously served as an assistant coach for the Jacksonville Jaguars, Chicago Bears, Tampa Bay Buccaneers, San Diego Chargers, and Grossmont College.

Polk played college football for the Nebraska Cornhuskers and was selected by the San Diego Chargers in the fourth round of the 2001 NFL draft. He played for 8 seasons in the NFL with the Chargers and Dallas Cowboys.

== Early life ==
Polk attended Guilford High School in Rockford, Illinois, where he was a standout linebacker for the Vikings football team. As a senior, he recorded 152 tackles, 13 quarterback sacks, 3 fumble recoveries, 3 blocked kicks and one interception.

He finished as one of the all-time leading tacklers in the state of Illinois high school history, with 453 career tackles, while also tallying 10 fumble recoveries, 7 blocked kicks, 5 interceptions and 30 tackles for loss. He received All-conference (three times), All-state, USA Today All-American and Northern Illinois Conference-9 Defensive Player of Year honors. He also practiced basketball.

== Playing career ==
=== College ===
Polk accepted a football scholarship from the University of Nebraska–Lincoln. As a redshirt freshman, he was a part of a Cornhuskers team that won the 1997 national championship. He appeared in 12 games, posting 32 tackles (6 for loss) and one sack.

As a sophomore, he appeared all 13 games, making 22 tackles (5 for loss), one pass defensed, 2 forced fumbles, one fumble recovery and one interception.

As a junior, he became a starter at middle linebacker, registering 83 tackles (second on the team), 12 tackles for loss (second on the team), 6.5 sacks (second on the team) and 21 quarterback hurries (led the team).

As a senior, he led the team with 90 tackles, while making 9 tackles for loss, 13 quarterback hurries (second on the team), one interception and 5 passes defensed. He finished his college career with 227 tackles (14th all-time in school history), 32 tackles for loss (9th all-time in school history) and 10 sacks.

In 2010, he was inducted into the Nebraska Football Hall of Fame.

=== National Football League ===
==== Pre-Draft ====
Pre-draft measurables
Height	Weight	Arm length	Hand span	40-yard dash	10-yard split	20-yard split	Wonderlic
6 ft 2 1/8 in (1.88 m)	251 lb (114 kg)	34 in (0.86 m)	9 in (0.23 m)	4.73 s	1.70 s	2.73 s	22
All values from the 2001 NFL Combine

==== San Diego Chargers ====
Polk was selected by the San Diego Chargers in the fourth round (112th overall) of the 2001 NFL draft. As a rookie, he played 6 games on special teams, finishing with 4 tackles after being placed on the injured reserve list with a torn rotator cuff injury on November 14.

In 2002, he was voted by teammates as the Chargers Special Teams Player of the Year, after leading the team with 13 tackles. He also registered his first-career safety and first-career blocked kick. In 2003, he was voted as the Chargers co-Special Teams Player of Year, after tying for the team lead with 16 tackles.

In 2004, he was declared inactive in the first game with a shoulder injury, he played in the second game against the New York Jets, only to be placed on the injured reserve list with a dislocated left shoulder on September 21. In 2005, he suffered an Achilles injury in the final off-season coaching session and was placed on the injured reserve list on July 28.

In 2006, he filled-in for a suspended Shawne Merriman in the first 4 games of the season. He went on to enjoy his best professional season, posting 32 defensive tackles, 2 sacks and 19 special teams tackles (second on the team) and received the team's Ed Block Courage Award.

In 2007, he started two games at inside linebacker in place of an injured Matt Wilhelm. On November 20, he was placed on the injured reserve list with a left shoulder injury he sustained in the November 18 game against the Jacksonville Jaguars, at the time he was leading the team with 11 special teams tackles. At the end of the year, he shared the team's Most Inspirational Player Award with Philip Rivers. Polk was released on August 30, 2008.

==== Dallas Cowboys ====
On October 16, 2008, Polk was signed as a free agent by the Dallas Cowboys, reuniting with head coach Wade Phillips, who was his defensive coordinator with the San Diego Chargers. He was signed for depth purposes after special teams player Sam Hurd was lost for the year with a high left-ankle sprain injury and Kevin Burnett was limited with a calf injury. He finished with 10 special teams tackles (sixth on the team), one forced fumble and one blocked punt. He wasn't re-signed at the end of the season.

== NFL career statistics ==
Legend
	Led the league
**Bold**	Career high

=== Regular season ===
Year	Team	Games		Tackles					Interceptions					Fumbles			
Year	Team	GP	GS	Cmb	Solo	Ast	Sck	TFL	Int	Yds	TD	Lng	PD	FF	FR	Yds	TD
2001	SDG	6	0	4	4	0	0.0	0	0	0	0	0	0	0	0	0	0
2002	SDG	15	0	17	16	1	1.0	1	0	0	0	0	0	0	0	0	0
2003	SDG	**16**	0	22	19	3	0.0	2	0	0	0	0	0	0	0	0	0
2004	SDG	1	0	1	1	0	0.0	0	0	0	0	0	0	0	0	0	0
2006	SDG	**16**	**4**	**45**	**35**	**10**	**2.0**	**3**	0	0	0	0	0	0	0	0	0
2007	SDG	10	2	24	20	4	1.0	1	0	0	0	0	**1**	**1**	0	0	0
2008	DAL	10	0	8	6	2	0.0	0	0	0	0	0	0	**1**	0	0	0
		74	6	121	101	20	4.0	7	0	0	0	0	1	2	0	0	0

=== Playoffs ===
Year	Team	Games		Tackles					Interceptions					Fumbles			
Year	Team	GP	GS	Cmb	Solo	Ast	Sck	TFL	Int	Yds	TD	Lng	PD	FF	FR	Yds	TD
2006	SDG	**1**	0	**1**	**1**	0	0.0	0	0	0	0	0	**1**	0	0	0	0
		1	0	1	1	0	0.0	0	0	0	0	0	1	0	0	0	0

== Coaching career ==
=== Grossmont College ===
In 2009, Polk began his coaching career at Grossmont College as their assistant special teams coach.

=== San Diego Chargers ===
In 2010, Polk was hired by the San Diego Chargers as their assistant special teams coach.

=== Dallas Cowboys ===
In 2013, Polk was hired by the Dallas Cowboys as a coaching intern under head coach Jason Garrett.

=== Tampa Bay Buccaneers ===
In 2014, Polk was hired by the Tampa Bay Buccaneers as their assistant special teams coach.

=== Dallas Cowboys (second stint) ===
In 2019, Polk returned an was hired by the Dallas Cowboys as their assistant special teams coach, reuniting with head coach Jason Garrett. In January 2020, he was not retained by the Cowboys new head coach Mike McCarthy.

=== Jacksonville Jaguars ===
On January 31, 2021, Polk was hired by the Jacksonville Jaguars as their assistant special teams coach under coordinator Brian Schneider and head coach Urban Meyer.

=== Chicago Bears ===
On February 11, 2022, Polk was hired as the assistant special teams coach by the Chicago Bears under new head coach Matt Eberflus and special teams coordinator Richard Hightower.

=== Dallas Cowboys (third stint) ===
On February 10, 2025, the Dallas Cowboys hired Polk to serve as their assistant special teams coach under head coach Brian Schottenheimer.
