= Rockford Township =

Rockford Township may refer to:

- Rockford Township, Winnebago County, Illinois
- Rockford Township, Floyd County, Iowa
- Rockford Township, Pottawattamie County, Iowa
- Rockford Township, Sedgwick County, Kansas
- Rockford Township, Wright County, Minnesota
- Rockford Township, Caldwell County, Missouri
- Rockford Township, Carroll County, Missouri
- Rockford Township, Gage County, Nebraska
- Rockford Township, Surry County, North Carolina
- Rockford Township, Renville County, North Dakota, in Renville County, North Dakota
- Rockford Township, Perkins County, South Dakota, in Perkins County, South Dakota
