= Henry Gunderson =

American politician

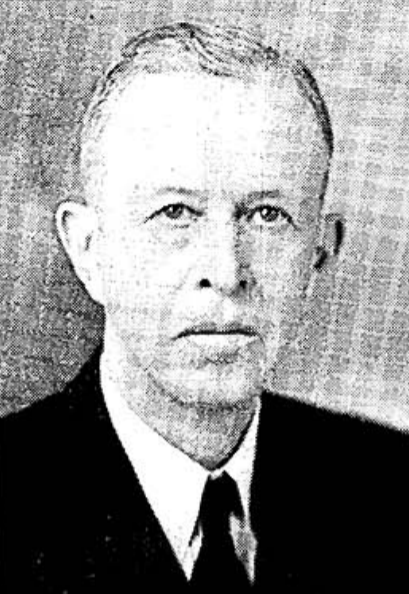

27th Lieutenant Governor of Wisconsin
- In office January 4, 1937 – October 16, 1937
- Governor: Philip La Follette
- Preceded by: Thomas J. O'Malley
- Succeeded by: Herman Ekern

Personal details
- Born: Henry A. Gunderson; June 20, 1878 Columbia County, Wisconsin, U.S.
- Died: October 7, 1940 (aged 62) Portage, Wisconsin, U.S.
- Cause of death: Heart attack
- Party: Progressive
- Education: University of Wisconsin; Columbia University
- Profession: Politician, attorney

Henry A. Gunderson (June 20, 1878 – October 7, 1940) was a Wisconsin attorney who served as the 27th Lieutenant Governor of Wisconsin.

Henry A. Gunderson was born in Columbia County, Wisconsin in 1878, the son of Norwegian immigrants. He graduated from the University of Wisconsin in 1900 and in 1903 received a law degree from Columbia University.

He returned to Wisconsin the next year, where he practiced law in Portage. He served several terms as the district attorney for Columbia County. In 1936, he became Lieutenant Governor of Wisconsin, but resigned on October 16, 1937, to accept an appointment to the state tax commission. After Governor Philip La Follette left office in 1939, the commission was disbanded, and Gunderson returned to his law practice. He died of a heart attack on October 7, 1940, in Portage, Wisconsin.

Party political offices
New Party established	Progressive nominee for Lieutenant Governor of Wisconsin; 1934, 1936	Succeeded by George A. Nelson
Political offices
Preceded by Thomas J. O'Malley	Lieutenant Governor of Wisconsin; 1936–1937	Succeeded by Herman Ekern
