= George Williamson (Florida politician) =

American politician

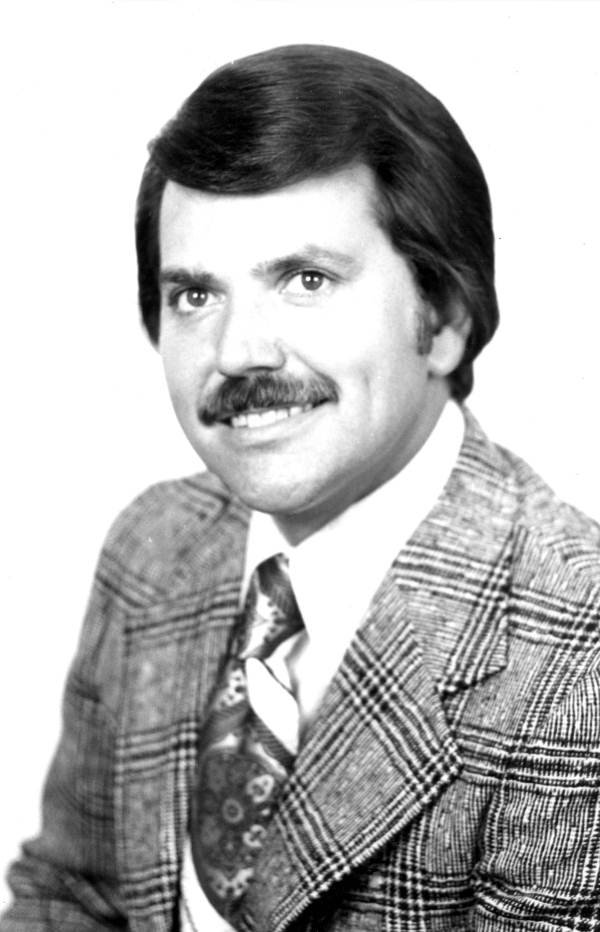

Member of the Florida Senate
- In office 1977–1980

Member of the Florida House of Representatives
- In office 1972–1976

Personal details
- Born: July 11, 1938 Chattanooga, Tennessee
- Died: August 17, 2010 (aged 72)
- Party: Republican
- Spouse: Andrea Tyler
- Children: one
- Education: University of Miami; Duke University; University of North Carolina at Chapel Hill
- Occupation: attorney

George A. Williamson (July 11, 1938 – August 17, 2010) was an American politician in the state of Florida.

Williamson was born in Chattanooga, Tennessee. He attended the University of Miami, Duke University, and University of North Carolina at Chapel Hill and is an attorney. He served in the Florida State Senate from 1977 to 1980, as a member of the Republican Party (29th district). He also served in the Florida House of Representatives from 1972 to 1976.

Williamson died on August 17, 2010, at the age of 72.
