= Rockford Central High School =

School in Illinois, US

Rockford High School
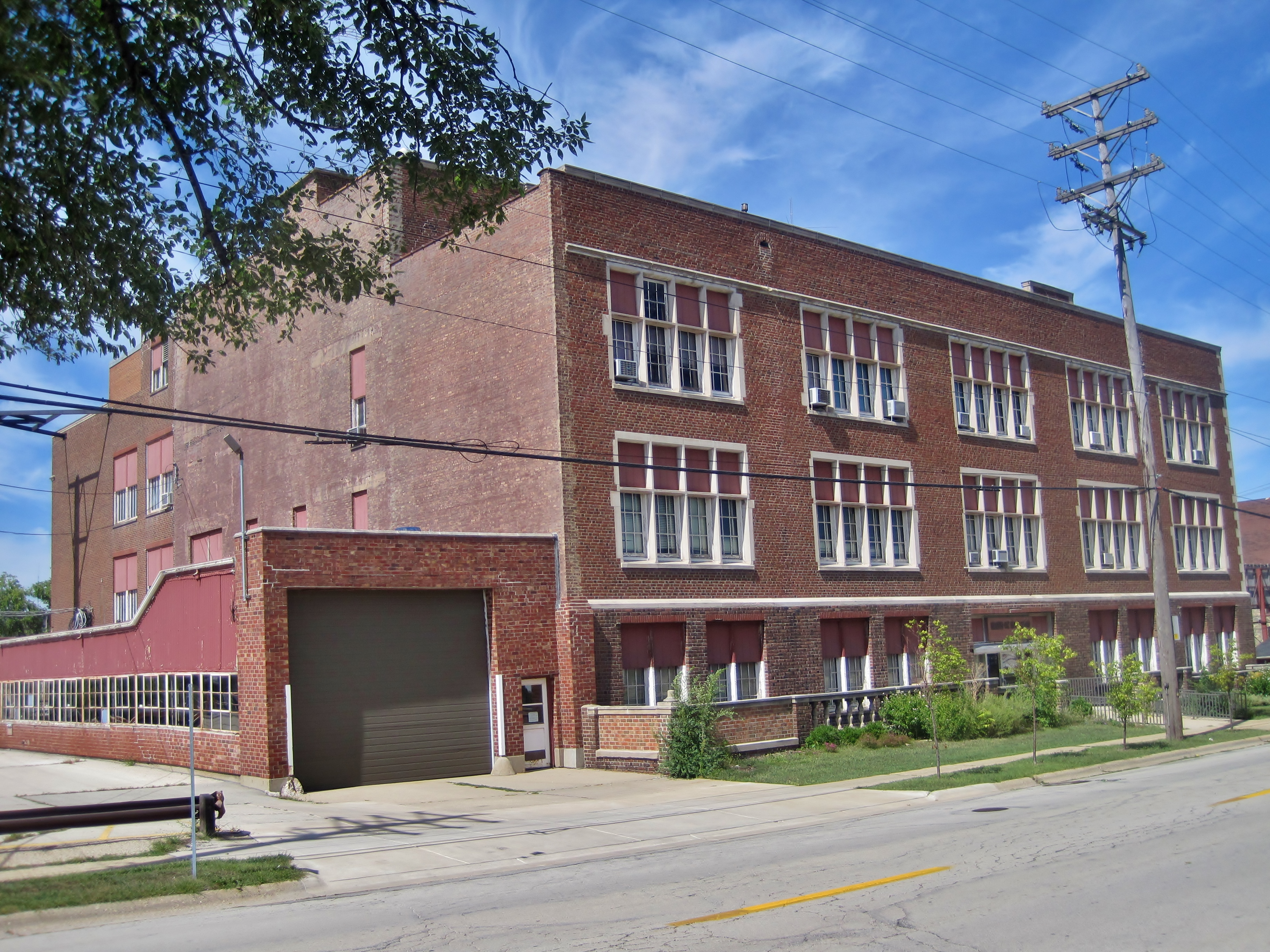
- Rockford School District 205 offices in 2013 (shortly before demolition)

Location
- 201 South Madison Street; Rockford, Illinois 61108; United States

Information
- School type: Public Secondary
- Opened: 1885
- Closed: 1940
- School district: Rockford Public School District 205
- Grades: 9–12
- Gender: Coed
- Colors: Red; Black
- Athletics conference: Big 7
- Team name: RABS (Red And Blacks)
- Yearbook: The Owl
- Website: Home

- Rockford Central High School
- U.S. Historic district – Contributing property
- Location within Illinois
- Location: Rockford, Winnebago County, Illinois, United States
- Coordinates: 42°16′5″N 89°5′29″W
- Built: 1905
- Architect: Edward Peterson & Gilbert Johnson
- Architectural style: Classical Revival
- Part of: Haight Village Historic District (ID87002044)
- Added to NRHP: November 20, 1987

Rockford High School (sometimes referred to as Rockford Central High School) was the first school opened by the newly formed citywide Rockford Public School District 205 in Rockford, Illinois. Opened in 1885, it served as a high school from 1885 until 1940, then as the administration offices of the school district until 2011. It was sold to the City of Rockford in 2014, and demolished in 2015 as part of a redevelopment project.

== History ==
Prior to providing a central location for education, students attended two separate school districts, one located on the east side of the Rock River, the other on the west side. These school districts were established in 1854, and opened buildings in 1857. By 1862, each district had established a high school, creating an east-vs-west rivalry that would continue for 22 years.

In 1884, the two districts united into one district, the Rockford Public School District 205. The new district built and opened a single high school located at 201 South Madison Street, originally two separate buildings attached by an underground hallway. The first commencement included twenty graduates in 1885. About 100 total students were enrolled in Rockford High School during its inaugural year. That number grew to 600 by 1900 and by the year 1940, that number would increase to nearly 3,600 students.

By 1935, the attendance at the single high school grew too large. The board of education decided it would be best to, once again, establish two new high schools on the east and west sides of the Rock River. In September 1940, both Rockford East and Rockford West High School opened. Rockford West, located on North Rockton Avenue on the Northwest side of the city, remained open for 48 years as a high school. It now serves as West Middle School for the Rockford Public School System. Rockford East, located on Charles Street, is still a functioning high school and maintains the traditions of Rockford High School.

The building was home to Rockford Public School District's central offices and board of education until February 2012.

== Demolition ==
The Rockford Board of Education voted Tuesday, August 24, 2011, to purchase the former Amcore financial headquarters building at 501 7th Street, Rockford, Illinois, at a cost of $1.825 million. The previous owner of the building was the Federal Deposit Insurance Corporation. This decision was taken because the board would have had to spend $1.7 million on state-mandated repairs to the building in order to keep using it.

In February 2014, the district determined it was spending about $3,000 a month to maintain the empty building. The city of Rockford was planning to build a $21 million indoor sports facility across the street from the building. The city wanted to put a 115-spot parking lot on the site of the building. Members of the Rockford School Board Operations Committee voted in favor of the idea. On September 23, 2014, the Rockford School Board approved an agreement with the City of Rockford to tear down the building, by August 2014, at a cost of $668,804, and to donate the one-acre parcel of land to the city, for the parking area for the proposed UW Health Sports Factory. The city agreed to give the district goods and services in the amount of $488,804, which is the cost of the demolition and remediation minus $180,000, the estimated five-year maintenance expenses for the building. The goods and services the city promised in the agreement included road salt, trees, and sidewalks for the district's elementary schools, and the vacating of an alley near East High School to make room for a new fieldhouse.

Demolition of the building took place in March 2015.

== Athletics ==
Rockford was considered a very large school for the IHSA and because of their size, they had a tremendous amount of athletic success. The RABS overall won eight state championships, including three in boys basketball (1911, 1919, 1939), four in track and field (1896, 1927, 1933, 1935), as well as a swimming championship in 1933. Rockford became the first school to win three IHSA championships in Basketball.

=== Basketball ===
Based on the IHSA Website (www.ihsa.org), Rockford saw more success from 1910 to 1940 than any other school in the state. During that 30-year span, the RABS not only won three championships, they qualified for the state tournament 12 times.

The IHSA began hosting a statewide championship for basketball in 1908. Rockford chose not to participate in the inaugural IHSA State Tournament because they were already considered "Champions of the State" and did not want to defend their title in this new tournament. More of what can be expanded on this topic is mentioned in a chapter of the book "100 Years of March Madness" by Scott Johnson, among others.

The 1903 squad gained the school a championship by defeating a Polo squad that had previously been undefeated followed by a victory over Freeport in the championship of "Northern Illinois outside of Cook County" with a final score of 10–6.

=== Football ===
Rockford first fielded a football team in 1893. During the history of the school, 405 football games were played with the RABS winning 262 of them.

=== Boys track & field ===
Besides basketball, Rockford's track and field team excelled above all others. The RABS won four of the school's eight state championships in the arena of track and field. Between 1895 and 1940, Rockford placed in the top 10 of competing schools 11 times, all with the same head coach, Charles E. Beyer.

== Notable alumni ==
- John Bayard Anderson (1939), 10 term member of the U.S. House of Representatives, 1961–1981.
- Barbara Hale (1938), an American actress best known for her role as legal secretary Della Street on more than 250 episodes of the long-running Perry Mason television series.
- Kate F. O'Connor (1878), an activist and businesswoman.
- Albert Spalding (1868), the co-founder of A.G. Spalding sporting goods company.
- Gordon Tullock (1939), an economist and professor of Law and Economics at the George Mason University School of Law.
- Lawrence Walquist (1918), a professional American football player who played quarterback for nine seasons for the Chicago Bears.
