= Thomas J. O'Malley =

20th century American politician (1868–1936)

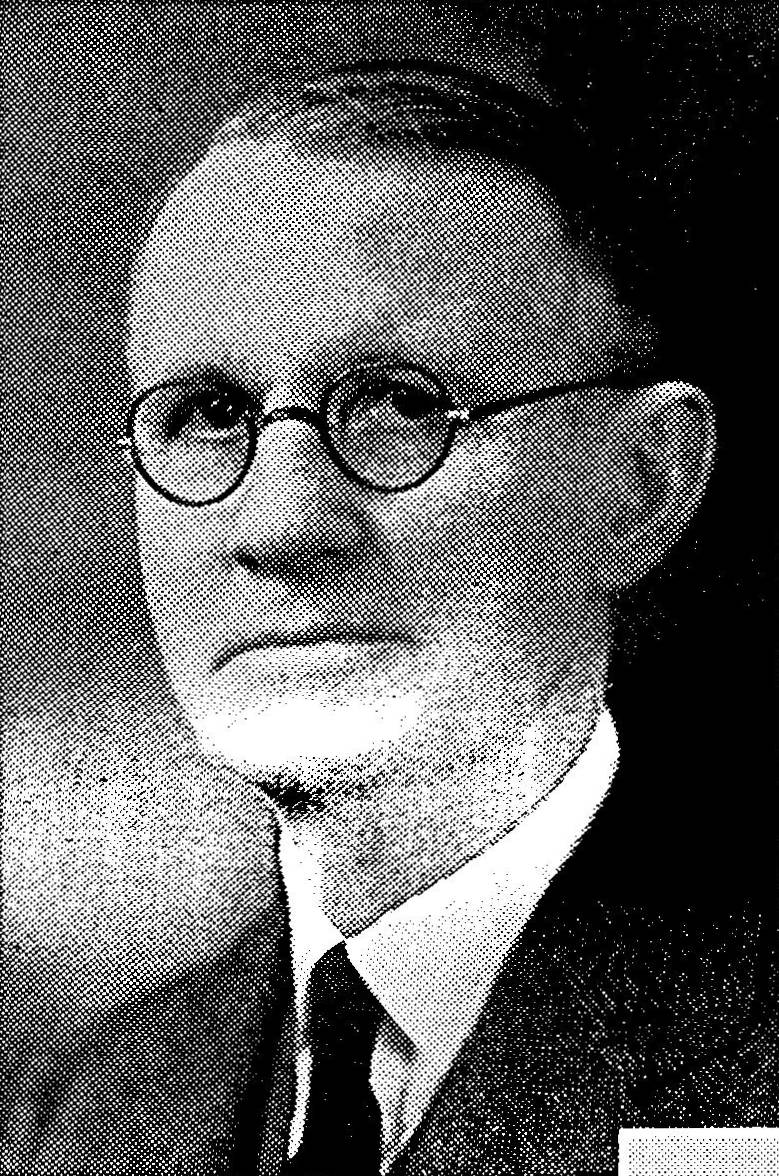
- O'Malley c. 1933

26th Lieutenant Governor of Wisconsin
- In office January 2, 1933 – May 27, 1936 (died)
- Governor: Albert G. Schmedeman; Philip La Follette
- Preceded by: Henry Huber
- Succeeded by: Henry Gunderson

Personal details
- Born: July 22, 1868 Menasha, Wisconsin, U.S.
- Died: May 27, 1936 (aged 67) Hot Springs, Arkansas, U.S.
- Cause of death: Heart attack
- Resting place: Holy Cross Cemetery, Milwaukee
- Party: Democratic
- Spouse: Mary Gertrude Walsh (m. 1901–1936)
- Children: Thomas D. P. O'Malley^{(b. 1903; died 1979)}; William James O'Malley^{(b. 1906; died 1968)}; Francis W. O'Malley^{(b. 1905)}; John Flavin O'Malley^{(b. 1910; died 1995)}; Andrew O'Malley; James Francis O'Malley
- Relatives: Thomas D. O'Malley Jr. (grandson); Terence T. O'Malley (grandson)
- Occupation: Railroad conductor, union delegate

Thomas James O'Malley (July 22, 1868 – May 27, 1936) was an Irish American railroad conductor, union delegate, and Democratic politician from Wisconsin. He was the 26th lieutenant governor of Wisconsin, serving from 1933 until his death in 1936. When elected in 1932, he was the first Wisconsin Democrat to be elected lieutenant governor since 1892. He was described in the 1933 Blue Book as the first "workingman" to hold statewide office in Wisconsin. At the same time he was elected lieutenant governor, his son Thomas D. P. O'Malley was elected a U.S. congressman.

== Early life ==
Thomas O'Malley was born in Menasha, Wisconsin, in July 1868, to an Irish Catholic family. He was raised and educated there, attending public and parochial schools. As a young man he went to work at several odd jobs, including hotel clerk and news agent, before becoming employed in the railroad industry.

He ended up working much of the rest of his life in the railroad industry, working for the Chicago and Northwestern Railroad. For the first decade or so he worked as a brakeman; he was promoted to work as a conductor at about the same time he moved to Milwaukee, about 1901. Through his employment, he also became active in the railroad union, which led him into politics. He served as legislative representative and chairman of the arbitration committee of the Order of Railway Conductors.

== Political career ==
In Milwaukee County, he became very active with the Democratic Party, serving often as a delegate to the county and state conventions. In 1924, he ran for chairman of the Democratic Party of Wisconsin as a supporter of William Gibbs McAdoo in his ambitions to become the Democratic nominee for President of the United States. O'Malley lost that election to the Al Smith slate. In 1928 and 1930, O'Malley supported his son, Thomas D. P. O'Malley, in two unsuccessful campaigns for United States House of Representatives in Wisconsin's 5th congressional district.

O'Malley was elected as an alternate delegate to the 1932 Democratic National Convention. His son was also a delegate, and was one of only two delegates holding out for Al Smith, rather than Franklin D. Roosevelt. That Summer, O'Malley announced he would seek the Democratic Party nomination for Lieutenant Governor of Wisconsin. He defeated Frank J. Grutza in the Democratic primary, and went on to win the general election with 51% of the vote.

O'Malley was serving as acting governor in early March 1933, with Governor Albert G. Schmedeman in Washington, D.C., for the presidential inauguration. His time as acting governor coincided with an escalating banking crisis in the midst of the Great Depression. On March 2, 1933, as acting governor, O'Malley issued a proclamation declaring a bank holiday requiring all banks to close. He modified his order six days later to allow some reopening of banks consistent with recent actions of the state's Banking Review Board.

As presiding officer of the Senate, he case a number of tie-breaking votes against his party's priorities, often finding common cause with the progressive Republican faction. He also engaged in a bitter feud with Republican state senator Bernhard Gettelman, and the two nearly got into a fist fight after a series of remarks on the Senate floor; they had to be restrained by other senators.

During campaigning the 1934 campaign, he acted as a ceremonial conductor on President Franklin Roosevelt's train while it traveled between Milwaukee and Chicago. O'Malley faced a primary challenge from Robert C. Johnson, the state administrator of the Civil Works Administration, but prevailed with 63% of the vote. Despite winning the primary, he was abandoned by the state party apparatus in the 1934 general election. He went on to win re-election without their support, though assisted by the emergence of the Wisconsin Progressive Party causing a three-way split of the major party votes.

O'Malley continued to frustrate members of his party's leadership and often acted in concert with the new Progressive majority under Governor Philip La Follette.

In 1936, O'Malley informed the Wisconsin State Journal that he planned to run for Governor of Wisconsin later that year on the Democratic Party ticket. But just a few days later, on May 27, 1936, he died of a heart attack while on vacation in Hot Springs, Arkansas.

== Personal life and family ==
Thomas J. O'Malley was one of at least ten children born to Irish American immigrants Patrick and Anna (née Holland) O'Malley.

Thomas J. O'Malley married Mary Gertrude Walsh on October 30, 1901, in Chicago. They had at least six children together. Their eldest son, Thomas D. P. O'Malley, served three terms in the U.S. House of Representatives, later he was a federal appointee in the U.S. Department of Labor.

== Electoral history ==
=== Wisconsin Lieutenant Governor (1932, 1934) ===
Wisconsin Lieutenant Gubernatorial Election, 1932
| Party | Candidate | Votes | % | ±% |
|---|---|---|---|---|
Democratic Primary, September 20, 1932
| Democratic | Thomas J. O'Malley | 80,661 | 65.78% | |
| Democratic | Frank J. Grutza | 41,957 | 34.22% | |
| Total votes | | 122,618 | 100.0% | |
General Election, November 8, 1932
| Democratic | Thomas J. O'Malley | 544,294 | 51.11% | +25.83% |
| Republican | Harry Dahl | 450,966 | 42.34% | −23.70% |
| Socialist | William Coleman | 63,380 | 5.95% | +0.22% |
| Prohibition | J. Kieth Peckham | 3,296 | 0.31% | −2.08% |
| Communist | Walter A. Harju | 2,617 | 0.25% | −0.32% |
| Socialist Labor | Abe Fisher | 430 | 0.04% | |
| Plurality | | 93,328 | 8.76% | -32.00% |
| Total votes | | 1,064,983 | 100.0% | +90.05% |
| Democratic gain from Republican | | | | |

Wisconsin Lieutenant Gubernatorial Election, 1934
| Party | Candidate | Votes | % | ±% |
|---|---|---|---|---|
Democratic Primary, September 18, 1934
| Democratic | Thomas J. O'Malley (incumbent) | 129,304 | 63.97% | −1.81% |
| Democratic | Robert C. Johnson | 72,831 | 36.03% | |
| Total votes | | 202,135 | 100.0% | +64.85% |
General Election, November 6, 1934
| Democratic | Thomas J. O'Malley (incumbent) | 322,873 | 36.28% | −14.83% |
| Progressive | Henry Gunderson | 313,682 | 35.25% | |
| Republican | Waldemar Wehe | 196,459 | 22.07% | −20.27% |
| Socialist | Robert Buech | 53,087 | 5.96% | +0.01% |
| Communist | Walter A. Harju | 2,393 | 0.27% | +0.02% |
| Prohibition | Edwin Kerswill | 1,104 | 0.12% | −0.19% |
| Socialist Labor | J. C. Schleier Jr. | 391 | 0.04% | |
| Plurality | | 9,191 | 1.03% | -7.73% |
| Total votes | | 889,989 | 100.0% | -16.43% |
| Democratic hold | | | | |

Party political offices
| Preceded by Berthold J. Husting | Democratic nominee for Lieutenant Governor of Wisconsin; 1932, 1934 | Succeeded by Edward H. Gervais |
Political offices
| Preceded by Henry Huber | Lieutenant Governor of Wisconsin; January 2, 1933 – May 27, 1936 (died) | Succeeded by Henry Gunderson |
