= Thomas O'Malley (congressman) =

20th century American politician (1903–1979)

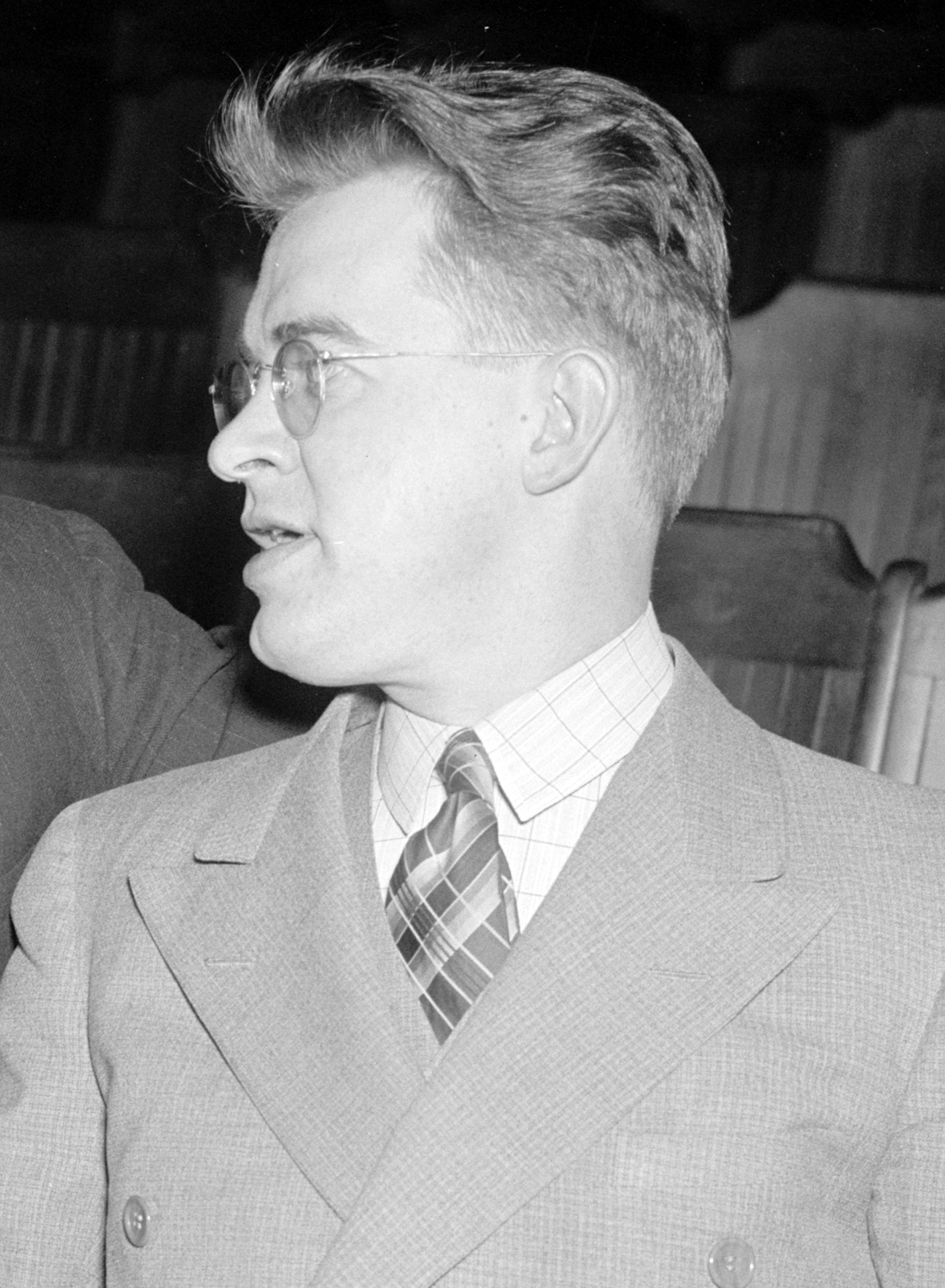

Member of the U.S. House of Representatives from Wisconsin's 5th district
- In office March 4, 1933 – January 3, 1939
- Preceded by: William H. Stafford
- Succeeded by: Lewis D. Thill

Personal details
- Born: March 24, 1903 Milwaukee, Wisconsin, U.S.
- Died: December 19, 1979 (aged 76) Chicago, Illinois, U.S.
- Cause of death: Blood clot
- Resting place: Saint Margarets Cemetery, Neenah, Wisconsin
- Party: Democratic
- Spouse: Gerda Henrietta Trumpy (m. 1933–1979)
- Children: Terence T. O'Malley; Thomas D. O'Malley Jr.; Martha O'Malley; Adeline (Smith)
- Parent: Thomas J. O'Malley (father)

Thomas David Patrick O'Malley Sr. (March 24, 1903 – December 19, 1979) was an American Democratic politician from Milwaukee, Wisconsin. He served three terms in the United States House of Representatives, representing Wisconsin's 5th congressional district from 1933 through 1939, and was later an appointee in the United States Department of Labor. His father, Thomas J. O'Malley, was the 26th lieutenant governor of Wisconsin.

== Biography ==
Thomas O'Malley was born in Milwaukee, Wisconsin, on March 24, 1903. He was raised and educated in Milwaukee, before attending Loyola University Chicago and the Y.M.C.A. College of Liberal Arts in Chicago. At an early age he became engaged in politics with the Democratic Party, due to his father's political activity.

He first sought elected office in 1928, running for United States House of Representatives in Wisconsin's 5th congressional district. He prevailed in the Democratic primary, but came in a distant third in the general election, behind the Socialist incumbent, Victor L. Berger, and the Republican victor, William H. Stafford. He made another attempt in 1930, but lost again to the Republican Stafford.

Two years later, O'Malley was elected as a delegate to the 1932 Democratic National Convention. He was one of only two delegates from Wisconsin who refused to vote for Franklin D. Roosevelt, remaining loyal to Al Smith. At the Fall general election, O'Malley ran again for Congress, and this time prevailed in the Democratic wave election, and went on to serve in the 73rd United States Congress.

O'Malley faced a bitter primary race running for re-election in 1934, but managed to prevail against four Democratic challengers. He went on to win his second term with just 34% of the vote, with the Wisconsin Progressive Party emerging as a fourth major party in the district. He faced multiple challengers in both 1936 and 1938, surviving again in 1936, but losing in 1938.

O'Malley's most noteworthy contribution during his six years in Congress was likely the Johnson–O'Malley Act, to subsidize education, medical facilities, and other services for the Native American population. It passed in 1934.

After leaving Congress, he was appointed regional director for the Wages and Hours division of the United States Department of Labor. His region comprised Wisconsin, Illinois, and Indiana, and he ultimately served in this role for another 18 years, retiring in 1956. During those years, he moved to Chicago, Illinois, where he resided for much of the rest of his life.

He died on December 19, 1979, at Northwestern Memorial Hospital in Chicago after suffering a blood clot.

== Electoral history ==
=== U.S. House of Representatives (1928–1938) ===
Year	Election	Date	Elected				Defeated				Total	Plurality
1928	General	Nov. 6	William H. Stafford	Republican	41,265	38.92%	Victor L. Berger (inc)	Soc.	40,536	38.24%	106,013	729
1928	General	Nov. 6	William H. Stafford	Republican	41,265	38.92%	Thomas O'Malley	Dem.	24,037	22.67%	106,013	729
1928	General	Nov. 6	William H. Stafford	Republican	41,265	38.92%	Herbert Friedrichs	Com.	169	0.16%	106,013	729
1930	General	Nov. 4	William H. Stafford (inc)	Republican	27,533	42.15%	James P. Sheehan	Soc.	26,357	40.35%	65,322	1,176
1930	General	Nov. 4	William H. Stafford (inc)	Republican	27,533	42.15%	Thomas O'Malley	Dem.	10,947	16.76%	65,322	1,176
1930	General	Nov. 4	William H. Stafford (inc)	Republican	27,533	42.15%	Raymond Hansborogh	Com.	469	0.72%	65,322	1,176
1932	General	Nov. 8	Thomas O'Malley	Democratic	57,294	43.77%	Joseph A. Padway	Rep.	32,559	24.87%	130,911	24,735
1932	General	Nov. 8	Thomas O'Malley	Democratic	57,294	43.77%	Herman O. Kent	Soc.	30,534	23.32%	130,911	24,735
1932	General	Nov. 8	Thomas O'Malley	Democratic	57,294	43.77%	Kavanaugh C. Downey	Ind.R.	6,503	4.97%	130,911	24,735
1932	General	Nov. 8	Thomas O'Malley	Democratic	57,294	43.77%	Emil B. Gennrich	Ind.R.	3,633	2.77%	130,911	24,735
1932	General	Nov. 8	Thomas O'Malley	Democratic	57,294	43.77%	Emil Gardos	Ind.	388	0.30%	130,911	24,735
1934	Primary	Sep. 18	Thomas O'Malley (inc)	Democratic	12,748	43.32%	William J. McCauley	Dem.	7,370	25.05%	29,425	5,378
1934	Primary	Sep. 18	Thomas O'Malley (inc)	Democratic	12,748	43.32%	James J. Kerwin	Dem.	4,157	14.13%	29,425	5,378
1934	Primary	Sep. 18	Thomas O'Malley (inc)	Democratic	12,748	43.32%	Albert L. Bell	Dem.	2,597	8.83%	29,425	5,378
1934	Primary	Sep. 18	Thomas O'Malley (inc)	Democratic	12,748	43.32%	Edmund L. Roncke	Dem.	2,553	8.68%	29,425	5,378
1934	General	Nov. 6	Thomas O'Malley (inc)	Democratic	32,931	34.67%	Otto Hauser	Soc.	23,334	24.57%	94,987	9,597
1934	General	Nov. 6	Thomas O'Malley (inc)	Democratic	32,931	34.67%	Arthur T. Spence	Rep.	21,533	22.67%	94,987	9,597
1934	General	Nov. 6	Thomas O'Malley (inc)	Democratic	32,931	34.67%	Carl J. Ludwig	Prog.	16,693	17.57%	94,987	9,597
1934	General	Nov. 6	Thomas O'Malley (inc)	Democratic	32,931	34.67%	Fred Basset Blair	Com.	496	0.52%	94,987	9,597
1936	Primary	Sep. 15	Thomas O'Malley (inc)	Democratic	12,467	55.62%	Carl R. Becker	Dem.	5,976	26.66%	22,416	6,491
1936	Primary	Sep. 15	Thomas O'Malley (inc)	Democratic	12,467	55.62%	Edward J. Malloy	Dem.	2,556	11.40%	22,416	6,491
1936	Primary	Sep. 15	Thomas O'Malley (inc)	Democratic	12,467	55.62%	Peter J. Zisch	Dem.	1,417	6.32%	22,416	6,491
1936	General	Nov. 3	Thomas O'Malley (inc)	Democratic	60,716	41.50%	Carl P. Dietz	Prog.	50,466	34.49%	146,303	10,250
1936	General	Nov. 3	Thomas O'Malley (inc)	Democratic	60,716	41.50%	Arthur T. Spence	Rep.	35,121	24.01%	146,303	10,250
1938	Primary	Sep. 15	Thomas O'Malley (inc)	Democratic	10,135	52.05%	Francis T. Murphy	Dem.	6,563	33.71%	19,470	3,572
1938	Primary	Sep. 15	Thomas O'Malley (inc)	Democratic	10,135	52.05%	James O'Connor	Dem.	2,772	14.24%	19,470	3,572
1938	General	Nov. 8	Lewis D. Thill	Republican	47,032	43.13%	Thomas O'Malley (inc)	Dem.	31,154	28.57%	109,041	15,878
1938	General	Nov. 8	Lewis D. Thill	Republican	47,032	43.13%	Alfred Benson	Prog.	29,874	27.40%	109,041	15,878
1938	General	Nov. 8	Lewis D. Thill	Republican	47,032	43.13%	Henry W. Otto	Union	981	0.90%	109,041	15,878

U.S. House of Representatives
Preceded by William H. Stafford	Member of the U.S. House of Representatives from Wisconsin's 5th congressional district March 4, 1933 – January 3, 1939	Succeeded by Lewis D. Thill
