= Richard A. Bird =

American politician (born 1940)

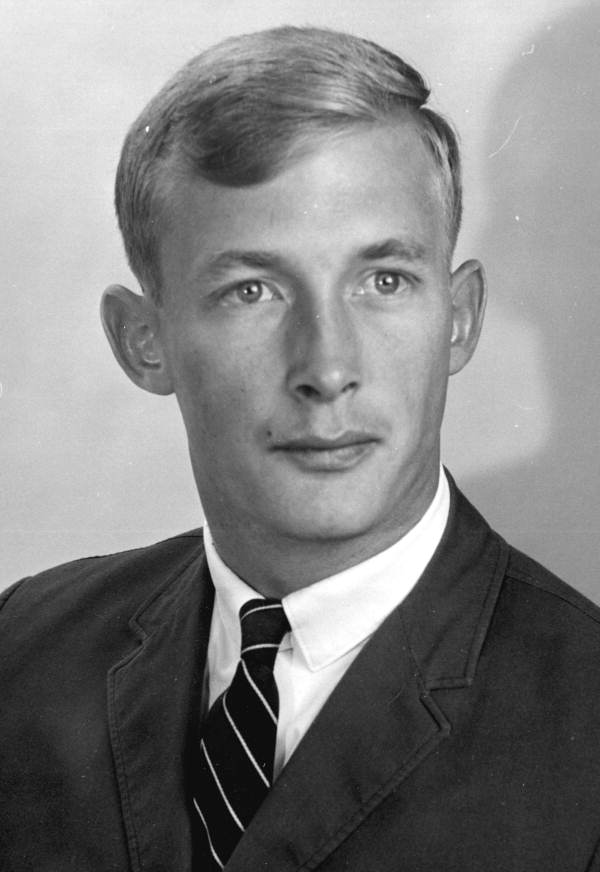

Member of the Florida House of Representatives from the 85th district
- In office 1966–1968
- Succeeded by: William G. Zinkil

Personal details
- Born: June 16, 1940 (age 86) Lansing, Michigan, U.S.
- Party: Republican
- Education: Michigan State University, University of Florida School of Law
- Occupation: attorney

Richard A. Bird (born June 16, 1940), is a politician in the American state of Florida. He served in the Florida House of Representatives from 1966 to 1968, representing the 85th district.
