= Rockford Public School District 205 =

School district in Rockford, Illinois, USA

Rockford Public Schools

Address
- 501 7th Street Rockford, Illinois, 61104; United States
- Coordinates: 42.262418°N 89.081370°W

District information
- Type: Public
- Motto: Readiness Rocks!
- Grades: PK–12
- Established: 1884
- Superintendent: Dr. Ehren Robert Jarrett
- Asst. superintendent(s): Matthew Vosberg
- Schools: 47
- NCES District ID: 1734510

Students and staff
- Students: 28,467 (2025–2026)
- Teachers: 1,631.70 (on an FTE basis) (2025–2026)
- Staff: 2,915.54 (on an FTE basis) (2025–2026)
- Student–teacher ratio: 17.45 (2025–2026)
- Athletic conference: Northern Illinois Conference (NIC-10)

Other information
- Website: www.rps205.com

Rockford Public Schools, officially designated by the state as Rockford Public Schools District 205 is a unit school district headquartered in Rockford, Illinois. In 2012, the district had an enrollment of 26,980 students, making it the fourth-largest school district by enrollment in Illinois. Per student, the school district spends approximately $11,400 on average.

Mostly in Winnebago County, the district includes the majority of Rockford, as well as New Milford, the majority of Cherry Valley (the portion in Winnebago County), portions of Loves Park, Machesney Park, and Roscoe, as well as most of the Argyle census-designated place. A portion of the district extends into Boone County, where it coincides with a piece of Loves Park and much of the Argyle CDP.

== History ==
=== Early 19th century ===
Following its founding as two separate settlements in the 1830s, residents of Rockford, Illinois (joined in 1839 from two separate communities) began to set up a network of schools in the community. From the 1830s to the 1850s, all of the schools in Rockford were private, charging tuition for students. In 1855, Illinois passed a law requiring communities to establish public schools free of tuition.

=== 1857-1884: Two school districts ===
In response to the state legislation requiring public schools, the city of Rockford established two separate school districts for each half of the city: District 1, east of the Rock River, and District 2, west of the river. Operated by the city council (in lieu of a formal school board), both school districts featured a graded structure, from first grade through high school.

The school systems on both sides of the city proved popular, with overcrowding becoming an issue by the end of the 1860s. Out of necessity, both districts built dedicated elementary schools.

=== 1884-1900: One school district ===
In 1884, the city of Rockford consolidated its separate school districts into a single citywide school district; a referendum to create a separate school board lost, keeping the schools under city control. As part of the unification, the two overcrowded schools serving high school grades were replaced by a centrally located dedicated high school, with Rockford Central High School opening in 1885.

During the 1890s, the school district began a campaign of school expansion and updates, replacing several stone school buildings with brick ones. In what has become a long-running tradition, school names were renamed from individual city wards to take on the names of historical Rockford citizens.

=== 1900-1950 ===
As Rockford expanded during the first decades of the 20th century, so did the school district, adding several elementary schools. By 1915, Rockford Central High had undergone three additions (in 1900, 1906, 1913), with the school district purchasing an additional building adjacent to the school in 1917. To partially address the overcrowding, the school district constructed two junior high schools in the early 1920s. As a further stopgap, 9th grade students were moved out of Central High School after their construction.

By the mid-1930s, the population of Rockford (which had grown seven-fold since 1885) had outgrown its single high school. In addition, the condition of Rockford Central High was considered too deteriorated to house students. In 1938, the school board approved $3 million in funding to build two new high schools to replace Rockford Central, with 45% of the budget funded by Works Progress Administration. Opened in 1940, Rockford East High School and Rockford West High School became the fourth and fifth secondary schools of the district (alongside a second west-side junior also high opened in 1940).

=== 1950-2000 ===
During the 1950s, Rockford underwent a significant period of population growth, becoming the second-largest city in Illinois. Coinciding with population growth, the city saw significant expansion away from the river westward and eastward. The creation of entirely new neighborhoods in the city led to construction of several elementary and junior high schools. By the early 1960s, the expansion outward led to the need for two more high schools, Rockford Auburn on the northwest side and Rockford Guilford on the northeast side. Rockford Jefferson on the southeast side was built in 1977 as a fifth high school (replacing a previous high school of the same name opened in 1956 as a junior high).

During much of the 1990s, the Rockford school district underwent a period of required school desegregation as part of a class-action lawsuit.

== Governance ==
Rockford Public Schools elects seven Board of Education members to oversee the district. They appoint a superintendent to carry out day-to-day district operations. The current Board of Education members are Paul Carpenter (President), Nicole Bennett (vice-president), June Stanford, Patricia Chavez, Kimberly Haley, Tiana McCall, and Denise Pearson. As of the 2025–2026 school year, Dr. Ehren Jarret is the superintendent however he will be set to take on a new superintendent job at Hononegah Community High School District #207. Larry Huff will succeed him as superintendent of Rockford Public Schools.

== Schools ==
With 45 schools in total, Rockford Public Schools has the third-largest number of schools of any district in the state. The district consists of four high schools, six middle schools, and 29 elementary schools. Beginning with the class of 2021, graduates of the Rockford Public Schools and residents within the city of Rockford with a cumulative 3.0 GPA can attend Northern Illinois University tuition free. This location-based scholarship program is a partnership between Rockford Public Schools, Northern Illinois University, Rockford Promise and the city of Rockford.
