= Boylan Catholic High School =

Boylan Central Catholic High School

Location
- 4000 Saint Francis Drive; Rockford, Illinois 61103; United States; 42°19′13″N 89°5′0″W

Information
- Type: Private Secondary
- Denomination: Roman Catholic
- Established: 1960
- Authority: Roman Catholic Diocese of Rockford
- President: Amy Ott
- Principal: Chris Rozanski
- Teaching staff: 46.5 (on an FTE basis)
- Grades: 9–12
- Gender: Coed
- Enrollment: 586 (2023–24)
- Student to teacher ratio: 12.6
- Colors: Green; White
- Athletics conference: Northern Illinois Conference (NIC-10)
- Nickname: (Lady) Titans
- Accreditation: North Central Association of Colleges and Schools
- Newspaper: Titan Tribune
- Yearbook: Edge
- Website: www.boylan.org

Boylan Central Catholic High School is a private Catholic high school located in Rockford, Illinois, United States. Founded in 1960, Boylan is the only Catholic high school in the city.

For the 2010–2011 school year, there were 1053 students enrolled. In the 2023–2024 school year, its enrollment number dropped to 586 students. It is located in and administered by the Roman Catholic Diocese of Rockford.

== Athletics ==
Boylan competes in the Northern Illinois Conference (NIC-10), and is a member of the Illinois High School Association (IHSA); the association which governs most sports and competitive activities in the state. Boys teams are stylized as the Titans, while women's teams are stylized as the Lady Titans.

The school sponsors interscholastic teams for both young men and women in basketball, bowling, cross country, golf, soccer, swimming & diving, soccer, tennis, volleyball and track & field. Men may compete in baseball, football, and wrestling, while young women may compete in Soccer, swimming, basketball, track, cross country, golf, bowling, tennis, volleyball, cheerleading and softball. While not sponsored by the IHSA, the school also sponsors a dance team for women in all grade levels.

The following teams have won their respective IHSA sponsored state championship tournaments or meets:

- Football: 2011 IHSA 7A State Champions. 2010 IHSA 6A State Champions.
- Golf: 2013 IHSA 2A State Champions. 2002 IHSA 2A State Champions
- Soccer: 2010 IHSA 3A State Champions. 2021 IHSA 2A State Champions.

== Notable alumni ==
- Jeffrey Anderson (game designer) (1985), former head of Hasbro, Inc.'s global gaming business, former CEO of Turbine, Inc., and award-wining game developer.
- Virgil Abloh (1998), former DJ and fashion designer, as the Men's Artistic Director of Louis Vuitton and also with notable brands Off-White and Pyrex Vision
- Jodi Benson (1979), American actress and singer, best known for her role as the voice of Princess Ariel from Disney's The Little Mermaid
- Joe Coniglio (2004), former college football defensive end and current outside linebackers coach for the Los Angeles Rams
- Derek Dimke (2008), former NFL kicker for Tampa Bay Buccaneers
- Robert Greenblatt (1978), American television executive, former chairman of NBC Entertainment
- Damir Krupalija (1998), Bosnian-American professional basketball executive and former player
- Dan Lindsay (1997), documentary filmmaker who won an Academy Award in 2012 for the documentary Undefeated
- Marin Mazzie (1978), actress and singer best known for her work in musical theater
- Joe Mantello (1980), two–time Tony Award-winning director (Assassins, Take Me Out)
- Anthony Tyler Quinn (1980), American actor who played Jonathan Turner on Boy Meets World
- Jake Smolinski (2007), MLB outfielder, Oakland A's
- Dean Lowry (2012), NFL defensive end for the Green Bay Packers
- Eric Sorensen (1994), congressperson and former meteorologist
