= Thomas Jefferson High School (Rockford, Illinois) =

Location
- 4145 Samuelson Road; Rockford, Illinois 61109; United States; 42.2071°N 89.0378°W

Information
- School type: Public Secondary
- Motto: Strive to be Respectful, Responsible, and Safe.
- Established: 1969
- School district: Rockford Public School District 205
- Superintendent: Ehren Robert Jarrett
- CEEB code: 143712
- Principal: Donald Lee Rundall
- Teaching staff: 112.20 (FTE)
- Grades: 9–12
- Gender: Coed
- Enrollment: 2,170 (2023-2024)
- Average class size: 18
- Student to teacher ratio: 19.34
- Campus type: Mid-size City
- Colors: Red; White; Gold
- Fight song: Notre Dame Victory March
- Athletics conference: Northern Illinois Conference (NIC-10)
- Mascot: J-Hawk
- Nickname: J-Hawks
- Newspaper: The Times
- Yearbook: Flight
- Website: Official School Website

Thomas Jefferson High School (commonly referred to as Jefferson High School, Rockford Jefferson, or JHS) is a public coed four-year high school, in Rockford, Illinois, United States. The school serves the city of Rockford and the neighboring villages of Cherry Valley, Illinois and New Milford, Illinois. The school is named after the third President of the United States, Thomas Jefferson.

== Athletics ==
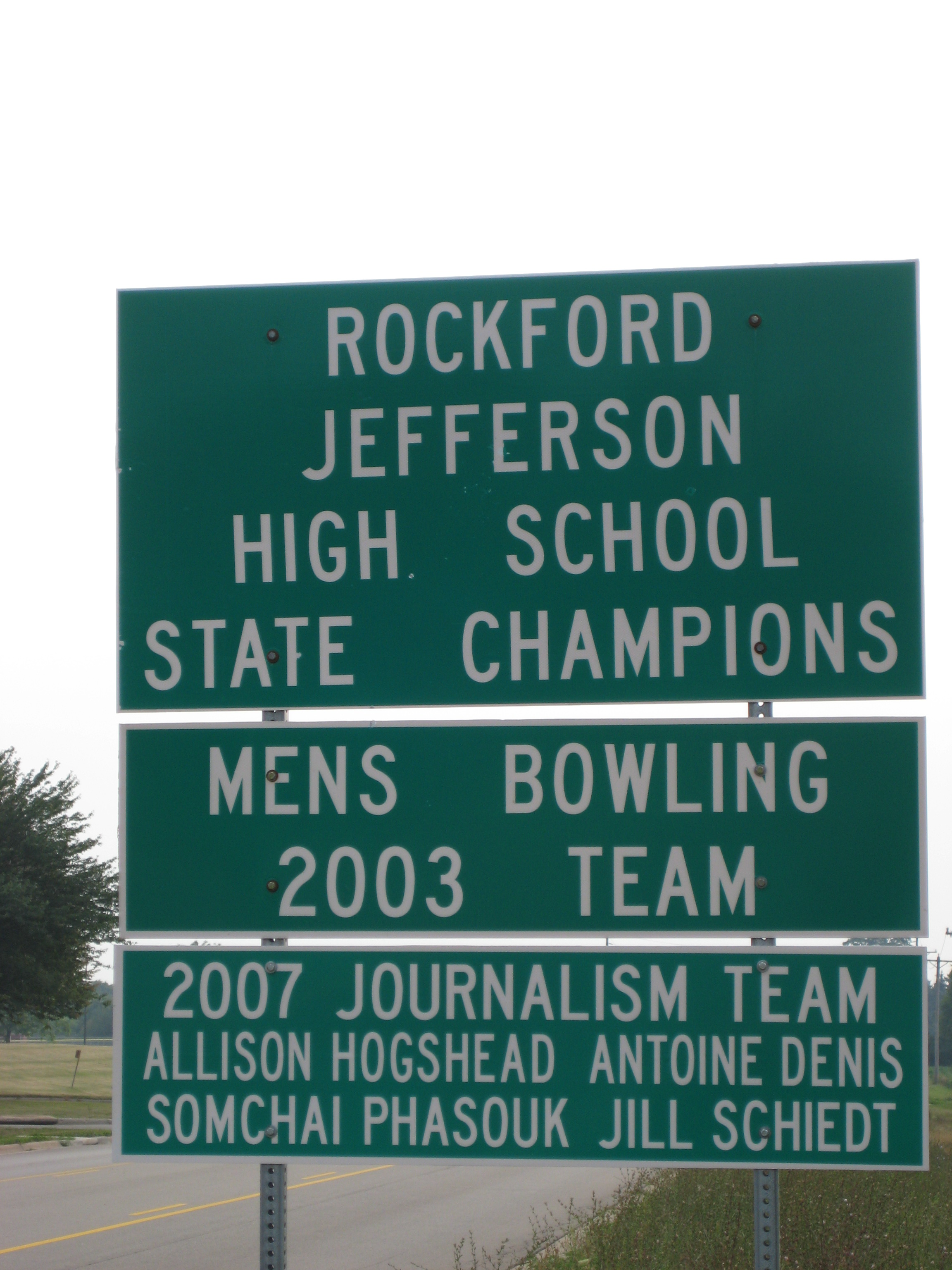

Jefferson High School's mascot is the J-Hawk. The official school colors are red, white, and gold.

Jefferson High School is a member of the Northern Illinois Conference (NIC-10) and participates in state championship tournaments sanctioned by the Illinois High School Association (IHSA).

The following competitive teams won their respective IHSA sanctioned state championship tournament:

- Bowling (Boys): State Champion (2002–03)
- Bowling (Girls): State Champion (2007–08)

== Activities ==
The following competitive teams won their respective IHSA sanctioned state championship tournament:

- Chess: State Champion (1990–91)
- Journalism: State Champion (2006–07)

== Notable alumni ==
- Leonard Bell (1982) - defensive back, Cincinnati Bengals
- Chad Knaus (1989) - crew chief, Jimmie Johnson, NASCAR Sprint Cup Series champion
- Kathryn Layng (1978) - actress, Doogie Howser, M.D.
