= Rockford East High School =

East High School

Location
- 2929 Charles Street; Rockford, Illinois 61108; United States
- 42°15′25″N 89°03′00″W

Information
- School type: Public Secondary
- Established: 1940
- School district: Rockford Public School District 205
- Superintendent: Ehren Robert Jarrett
- Principal: Jim Parker
- Teaching staff: 100.31 (on an FTE basis)
- Grades: 9–12
- Gender: Coed
- Enrollment: 1,708 (2023-2024)
- Student to teacher ratio: 17.03
- Campus type: Mid-size City
- Colors: Red; Black
- Athletics conference: Northern Illinois Conference (NIC-10)
- Nickname: E-Rabs
- Yearbook: Argus
- Website: Official School Website

Rockford East High School (sometimes referred to as East) is a comprehensive four year high school of Rockford Public School District 205 in Rockford, Illinois. Opened in 1940 to replace Rockford High School, East opened simultaneous to Rockford West to serve the quickly expanding population.

== History ==
By 1935, the attendance in Rockford's single high school grew too large. The board of education decided it would be best to establish two new high schools on the East and West sides of the Rock River. In 1938, the school board approved $3 million in funding to build two new high schools to replace Rockford High School, with 45% of the budget funded by Works Progress Administration. Rockford High School was renamed as Central High School and the two new schools were opened as East High School and West High School. Rockford West, located on North Rockton Avenue on the Northwest side of the city, remained open for 48 years as a high school, it now serves as West Middle School. Rockford East, located on Charles Street, is still a functioning high school and maintains the traditions of Rockford High School.

== Athletics ==
East takes part in the Northern Illinois Conference (NIC-10) and is a member of the Illinois High School Association.

Notably, during the 1940s, East's Boys Golf Team placed first in half of the IHSA championships played during the decade, with one additional first place in the late 1950s. 4 of these first place winnings were in a row from the school years 1940-41 to 1944-45 with the 5th being disconnected by placing second in 1945-46, losing by 6 strokes to Hinsdale Central High School.

== Notable alumni ==
- Bill Erickson (Class of 1946), consensus Second Team All-American basketball player at Illinois.
- John E. Erickson, basketball head coach at Wisconsin, general manager of NBA's Milwaukee Bucks and politician
- Robert Jones, NFL player
- Natasha Leggero, comedian
- Ira Matthews (Class of 1975), football player with the Oakland Raiders
- Rodney Myers, MLB pitcher (Chicago Cubs, San Diego Padres, Los Angeles Dodgers).
- Jerry Stalcup, NFL player with the Los Angeles Rams and the Denver Broncos
- Ed Viesturs - Mountain Climber
