= South Seven Conference =

High school athletic conference in Illinois

- Conference: IHSA
- Founded: 1939
- No. of teams: 5
- Region: Southern Illinois and Metro East

The South Seven Conference is a high school athletic conference comprising five schools in the southern Illinois.

== History ==
The South Seven was formed in 1939 when Centralia and Mt. Vernon departed the North Egyptian Conference and joined Marion, Benton, Harrisburg, Herrin and West Frankfort (hence, the name of the conference since it only had 7 members). Carbondale joined the conference in 1965, but the name of the conference was not changed.

In 1993, the four smallest schools (Benton, Harrisburg, Herrin and West Frankfort) departed for the River-to-River Conference. Edwardsville and O'Fallon were added, with the former being a short-term replacement while a permanent member was sought. In 1995, Edwardsville left for the Southwestern Conference and was replaced by Cahokia. Over the next couple of years, O'Fallon would continue to grow to the point that it was much larger than the rest of the schools, and in 2000 the Panthers also left for the Southwestern Conference, replaced by Belleville Althoff. Throughout the changes, the "South Seven" moniker has remained even though the conference never had exactly 7 member schools in almost 50 years. That was to change for the 2018–19 season, when Granite City was due to leave the Southwestern Conference and join the South Seven, but a vote in March 2018 (a 3–3 tie) denied Granite City's entry into the conference until at least 2020. This vote was based heavily on scheduling issues and the amount of traveling for most of the teams in the conference.

In 2023, Althoff Catholic High School left the conference to join the Gateway Metro Conference.

In 2025, it was announced that Highland High School will be joining the South Seven Conference, effective the 2026–27 school year. Highland, which sports an enrollment of 897, is presently a member of the Mississippi Valley Conference. This coincided with founding member, Centralia High School, choosing to leave the South Seven and join the Cahokia Conference starting the 2026-27 school year due to enrollment issues.

== Member schools ==
South Seven Conference Members (clickable map)

School	Location (City Population)	Enrollment	Mascot	Colors	Membership	Former Conference
Cahokia High School	Cahokia, Illinois (12,096)	798	Comanches	Blue; White	1995–Present	Bi-County Conference
Carbondale Community High School	Carbondale, Illinois (25,083)	993	Terriers	Black; White	1963–Present	South Egypt Conference
Highland High School	Highland, Illinois (9,991)	798	Bulldogs	Red; Black	2026–Present	Mississippi Valley Conference
Marion High School	Marion, Illinois (16,855)	1,071	Wildcats	Blue; Gold	1939–Present	South Egypt Conference
Mount Vernon Township High School	Mount Vernon, Illinois (14,600)	1,107	Rams/Lady Rams	Orange; Black	1939–Present	North Egypt Conference

== Former members of the South Seven Conference ==
School	Nickname	Colors	Location	Years Member	Current Conference
Benton Consolidated High School	Rangers		Benton, IL	1939–1993	Southern Illinois River-to-River Conference
Centralia High School	Orphans/Annies		Centralia, IL	1939-2026	Cahokia Conference
Edwardsville High School	Tigers		Edwardsville, IL	1993–1995	Southwestern Conference
Frankfort Community High School	Redbirds		West Frankfort, IL	1939–1993	Southern Illinois River-to-River Conference
Harrisburg High School	Bulldogs		Harrisburg, IL	1939–1993	Southern Illinois River-to-River Conference
Herrin High School	Tigers		Herrin, IL	1939–1993	Southern Illinois River-to-River Conference
O'Fallon High School	Panthers		O'Fallon, IL	1993–2000	Southwestern Conference
Althoff Catholic High School	Crusaders		Belleville, Illinois	2000–2023	Gateway Metro Conference

== Membership timeline ==
Full members Cahokia Conference Southern Illinois River-to-River Conference Southwestern Conference Gateway Metro Conference

== See also ==
- List of Illinois High School Association member conferences
