= Coal Belt Conference =

US high school athletic conference

- Conference: IHSA
- Founded: 1946
- Folded: 1956
- No. of teams: 7
- Region: Southern Illinois

The Coal Belt Conference was an Illinois high school athletic conference in existence from 1946 to 1956. The conference dissolved when 5 of its 7 members joined the Black Diamond Conference full-time.

== Members ==
School	Location	Nickname	Colors	Years Member	Additional Information
Carbondale University High School	Carbondale, Illinois	Lynxes	Maroon; Gray	1946–1956	Joined the Black Diamond Conference in 1963. Closed in 1968.
Carterville High School	Carterville, Illinois	Lions	Navy Blue; Orange	1946-1956	Left for the Black Diamond Conference. Joined the Southern Illinois River-to-River Conference in 2010.
Christopher High School	Christopher, Illinois	Bearcats	Blue; Orange	1946-1956	Left for the Black Diamond Conference.
Elkville High School	Elkville, Illinois	Bluebirds	Blue; White	1946-1956	Left for the Black Diamond Conference. Consolidated with Vergennes and Dowell to form Elverado in 1962.
Hurst-Bush High School	Hurst, Illinois	Hummers	Blue; Gold	1946-1956	Closed in 1966.
Sesser High School	Sesser, Illinois	Red Devils	Maroon; White	1946-1956	Left for the Black Diamond Conference. Consolidated with Valier to form Sesser-Valier in 1963.
Zeigler High School	Zeigler, Illinois	Purple Tornadoes	Purple; White	1946-1956	Left for the Black Diamond Conference. Consolidated with Royalton to form Zeigler-Royalton in 1962.

== See also ==
- Black Diamond Conference
