= North Egypt Conference =

Former Illinois high school athletic conference

- Founded: 1929
- Ceased: 2003
- No. of teams: 8
- Region: Southern Illinois

Locations
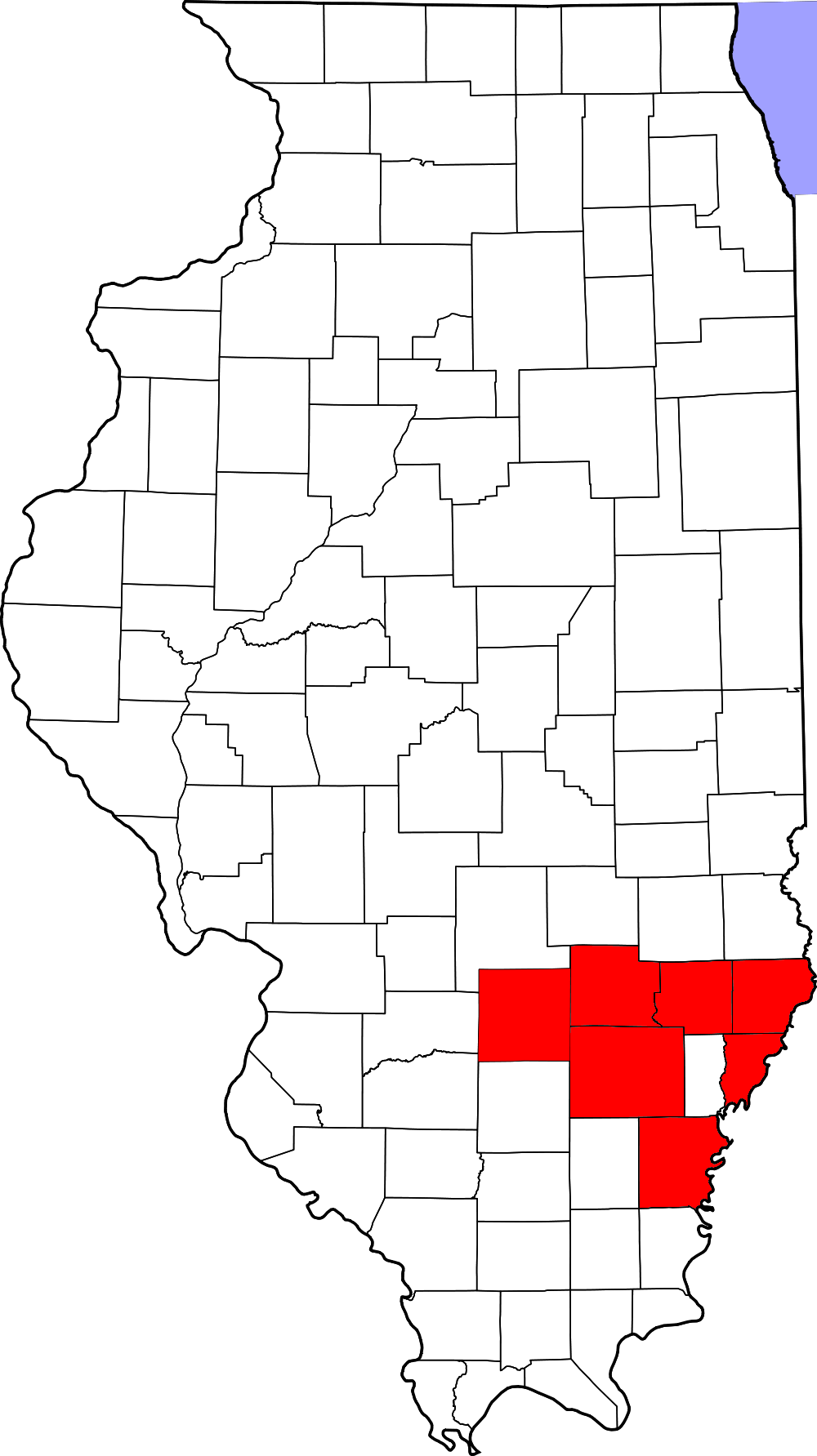

The North Egypt Conference (NEC) was an Illinois high school athletic conference in existence from 1929 to 2003.

== Former members ==
School	Location (Population)	Nickname(s)	Colors	Years Member	Current Conference
Carmi-White County High School	Carmi, Illinois (5,442)	Bulldogs	Maroon; White	1957 - 2003	Black Diamond Conference
Centralia High School	Centralia, Illinois (13,032)	Orphans; Orphan Annies	Cardinal; White	1929 - 1938	South Seven Conference
East Richland High School	Olney, Illinois (8,631)	Tigers	Orange; Black	1929 - 2003	Little Illini Conference(merged with West Richland to form Richland County High School)
Fairfield Community High School	Fairfield, Illinois (5,421)	Mules	Red; Black	1929 - 2003	Black Diamond Conference
Flora High School	Flora, Illinois (5,086)	Wolves	Blue; Orange	1929 - 2003	Little Illini Conference
Lawrenceville High School	Lawrenceville, Illinois (4,745)	Indians	Red; White	1929 - 2001	Little Illini Conference
Mount Carmel High School	Mount Carmel, Illinois (7,982)	Golden Aces	Maroon; Gold	1929 – 2003	Little Illini Conference
Mt. Vernon Township High School	Mt. Vernon (15,269)	Rams; Lady Rams	Orange; Black	1929 – 1938	South Seven Conference
Red Hill High School	Bridgeport, Illinois (2,168)	Salukis	Red; White; Blue	1929 - 2001	Little Illini Conference
Salem Community High School	Salem, Illinois (7,909)	Wildcats	Green; Red	1929 - 2003	Cahokia Conference

== State Titles (while a member of the NEC) ==
School	Sport	Titles	Years	Total
Carmi	Boys Golf	5	1975, 1976, 1977, 1978, 1979	5
Lawrenceville	Boys Basketball	4	1972, 1974, 1982, 1983	4
Mount Carmel	Football	1	1981	1

Additionally, the following trophies were won by NEC member schools while members of the conference (not necessarily in NEC-sanctioned sports):

School	Sport	Titles	Years	Total
Bridgeport (Red Hill)	Boys Basketball	1	1960 (2nd, as Bridgeport)	1
Carmi (C.-White County)	Boys Gymnastics	1	1952 (3rd)	5
Carmi (C.-White County)	Softball	2	1991 (4th, Class A), 1997 (3rd, Class A)	5
Carmi (C.-White County)	Baseball	1	1993 (3rd, Class A)	5
Carmi (C.-White County)	Boys Golf	1	2001 (3rd, Class A)	5
Fairfield	Scholastic Bowl	1	1997 (4th, Class A)	1
Flora	Scholastic Bowl	1	1999 (4th, Class A)	1
Lawrenceville	Boys Basketball	2	1932 (3rd), 1976 (3rd, Class A)	7
Lawrenceville	Wrestling	5	1939 (2nd), 1940 (2nd), 1942 (3rd), 1984 (3rd, Class A), 1985 (4th, Class A)	7
Mount Carmel	Baseball	3	1957 (2nd), 1979 (2nd, Class AA), 1980 (Class A)	6
Mount Carmel	Football	3	1974 (2nd, 3A), 2001 (2nd, 4A), 2002 (2nd, 4A)	6
Olney (East Richland)	Boys Basketball	1	1930 (3rd)	3
Olney (East Richland)	Boys Tennis	1	1957 (3rd)	3
Olney (East Richland)	Baseball	1	1997 (3rd, Class A)	3
Salem	Boys Basketball	1	1943 (3rd)	2
Salem	Scholastic Bowl	1	1987 (2nd)	2

== State Titles (not while a member of the NEC) ==
School	Sport	Titles	Years	Total
Centralia	Boys Basketball	3	1918, 1922, 1942	3
Mount Carmel	Boys Basketball	1	1927	3
Mount Carmel	Boys Golf	1	2010	3
Mount Carmel	Girls Golf	1	2021	3
Mt. Vernon	Boys Basketball	4	1920, 1949, 1950, 1954	4
Salem	Boys Bowling	1	2007	1
