= Apollo Conference =

- Conference: IHSA
- Founded: 1970
- No. of teams: 6 Class 4A
- Region: Central Illinois (Champaign, Christian, Coles, Effingham, and Macon counties)
- State titles: 10

The Apollo Conference is a high school athletic conference represented by 6 schools in the central portion of Illinois. It is a member of the Illinois High School Association.

The conference offers championships for girls in basketball, cross country, golf, softball, tennis, track & field, and volleyball. In boys' sports, the Apollo offers championships in baseball, basketball, cross country, football, golf, tennis, track & field, and wrestling.

== History ==
The conference was formed in 1970 by charter members Charleston, Newton, Paris and Robinson who left from the Eastern Illinois Conference. In 1972 Decatur Lakeview and Mt. Zion joined the conference after departing the Cenois Conference. Effingham and Taylorville joined in 1981, leaving the Mid-State Conference. Lakeview closed in 1982, bringing the conference back to seven members. In 1993 Taylorville left to join the newly formed Central State Eight Conference. Olney and Salem joined from the North Egypt Conference, which was dissolved in 2003.

Significant changes have occurred for the Apollo Conference. Founding members Newton and Robinson, as well as Olney, left for the Little Illini Conference in the 2012–13 school year. Mattoon joined the league in that same school year, departing from the Big 12 Conference. Teutopolis was invited to join the conference, but declined the invitation. The Taylorville Tornadoes rejoined the conference in 2014, while another Apollo founding school, Paris, left for the Little Illini Conference. In 2015, Corn Belt Conference member Mahomet-Seymour was accepted into the conference starting with the 2017–2018 school year. Later in the same year, Central State Eight conference member Lincoln was accepted to join in 2017–2018. Shortly after, Salem elected to join the Cahokia Conference in 2017–18. In 2023, Lincoln left the Apollo and joined their previous league, The Central State Eight.

Geographical concerns and school enrollment has played a part in the switching between Apollo and Little Illini Conferences. Charleston is the only founding member of the conference to stay in the Apollo, while Newton, Paris and Robinson have moved into the LIC.

== Current members ==
Apollo Conference Members (clickable map)

School	Location (Population)	Nickname	Colors	Affiliation	Enrollment 2022-23	Year Joined	Previous conference	School Website
Charleston High School	Charleston, Illinois (20,117)	Trojans	Scarlet and Gold	Public	796	1970	Eastern Illinois Conference	http://www.charleston.k12.il.us/chs/
Effingham High School	Effingham, Illinois (12,511)	Flaming Hearts	Red, White and Forest Green	Public	736	1981	Mid-State Conference	http://www.effingham.k12.il.us
Mahomet-Seymour High School	Mahomet, Illinois (8,605)	Bulldogs	Orange and Navy	Public	987	2017	Corn Belt Conference	https://www.ms.k12.il.us/o/high-school
Mattoon High School	Mattoon, Illinois (17,615)	Green Wave	Green and Gold	Public	930	2012	Big Twelve Conference	http://www.mattoon.k12.il.us
Mt. Zion High School	Mount Zion, Illinois (5,795)	Braves	Red and White	Public	763	1972	Cenois Conference	http://www.mtzion.k12.il.us/pages/mtzion
Taylorville High School	Taylorville, Illinois (10,360)	Tornadoes	Purple and Gold	Public	756	1981, 2014	Central State Eight Conference	http://www.tcusd3.org

== Former members ==
School	Nickname	Colors	Location	Enrollment	Year Departed	Conference Joined
Lakeview High School	Spartans		Decatur, IL	N/A	1982	School Closed in 1982
Lincoln High School	Railsplitters		Lincoln, IL	810	2023	Central State Eight Conference
Newton Community High School	Eagles		Newton, IL	434	2012	Little Illini Conference
Paris High School	Tigers		Paris, IL	561	2014	Little Illini Conference
Richland County High School	Tigers		Olney, IL	735	2012	Little Illini Conference
Robinson High School	Maroons		Robinson, IL	464	2012	Little Illini Conference
Salem Community High School	Wildcats		Salem, IL	647	2017	Cahokia Conference

== Membership timeline ==
Full members Full members (non-football) Full members (8-man football) Full members (Football Coop) Other Conference Central State Eight Conference Little Illini Conference) Cahokia Conference

== See also ==
- List of Illinois High School Association member conferences
