= Nashville Community High School District 99 =

Coordinates: 38°20′0″N 89°22′44.3″W

Nashville Community High School
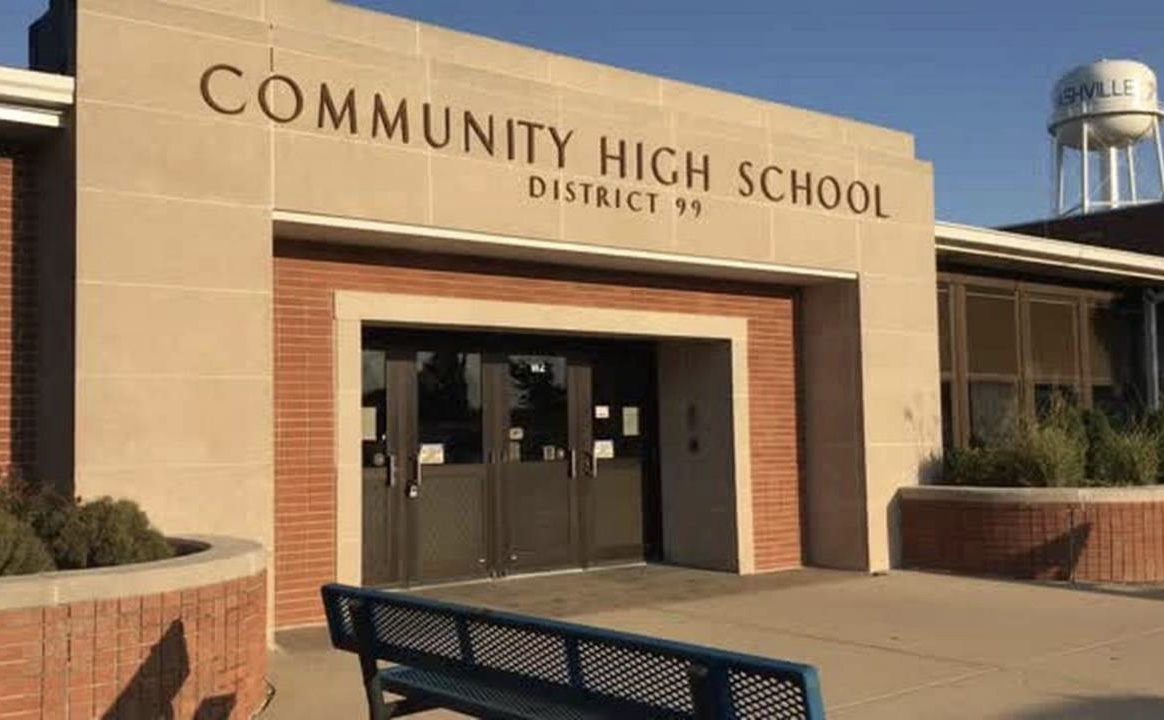
- The main entrance to Nashville Community High School

Location
- 1300 South Mill Street; Nashville, Illinois 62263; United States

Information
- Type: Public
- Established: 1954
- School board: NCHS Board of Education
- School district: Nashville Community High School District 99
- Superintendent: Brad Turner
- Principal: Mark Begando
- Faculty: 29.64 (on FTE basis)
- Grades: 9 to 12
- Enrollment: 359 (2024-2025)
- Student to teacher ratio: 13.29
- Colors: Red, Royal Blue, White
- Song: “Illinois Loyalty”
- Athletics conference: Southern Illinois River-to-River Conference
- Sports: Basketball, Baseball, Football, Track & Field, Volleyball, Softball, Golf, Cross Country, Swimming, Cheerleading, Dance, Bass Fishing, Tennis
- Nickname: “Big Blue”
- Team name: Hornets and Hornettes
- Rivals: Okawville Rockets, Pinckneyville Panthers, Mater Dei Knights, Central Cougars
- Website: www.nashville-k12.org

Nashville Community High School is a public high school located in Nashville, Illinois. The school educates about 400 students in grades 9 to 12.

== Notable alumni ==
- Kirk Rueter - Retired MLB pitcher for the Montreal Expos and the San Francisco Giants. He is the Giants franchise record holder for career wins by a left-handed pitcher in the San Francisco Era, and a member of the San Francisco Giants Hall of Fame.
- Royce Newman - Current NFL offensive lineman for the Los Angeles Rams. He was drafted in the 2021 NFL Draft by the Green Bay Packers in the 4th round, as the 142nd overall pick. During his college career, he played offensive guard and tackle at Ole Miss. In 2021, he was named to the Reese's Senior Bowl. He has also played for the Arizona Cardinals, New England Patriots, Chicago Bears, and Tampa Bay Buccaneers.

== Athletics ==
The Hornets and Hornettes, the school's athletic teams, compete in the Southern Illinois River-to-River Conference and have won 9 Illinois High School Association championships. They have also had 10 runner-up appearances, 9 3rd-place finishes, and 6 4th-place finishes.

- Baseball: 4th 1994 (Class A)
- Boys Basketball: 4th 1949; State Champions 1978 (Class A); 2nd 2014 (Class 2A), 2nd 2019 (Class 2A); State Champions 2022 (Class 2A)
- Football: 2nd 1998 (Class 3A), 2nd 2019 (Class 2A), 2nd 2021 (Class 2A)
- Boys Track: 2nd 1997 (Class A); State Champions 1998 (Class A)
- Boys Golf: 3rd 2013 (Class 1A); 3rd 2014 (Class 1A)
- Girls Basketball: 3rd 1989 (Class A); 2nd 1990 (Class A); 4th 2002 (Class A); 3rd 2009 (Class 2A); 3rd 2010 (Class 2A); 4th 2011 (Class 2A); State Champions 2013 (Class 2A); 2nd 2024 (Class 2A); State Champions 2025 (Class 2A)
- Girls Golf: 3rd 2010 (Class A); 2nd 2011 (Class A); State Champions 2013 (Class A); 2nd 2016 (Class 1A); 3rd 2017 (Class 1A)
- Softball: 4th 1999 (Class A); State Champions 2001 (Class A); 3rd 2004 (Class A); State Champions 2012 (Class 2A); 3rd 2013 (Class 2A); State Champions 2015 (Class 2A)
- Volleyball: 4th 2018 (Class 2A)
