= South Egyptian Conference =

- Conference: IHSA
- No. of teams: 9
- Region: Southern Illinois

The South Egyptian Conference (SEC) is a small school conference in southern Illinois.

SEC schools compete in baseball, softball, basketball, both boys and girls, and girls' volleyball. All schools in the SEC are a part of and participate in IHSA sporting events.

Locations of Current South Egyptian Schools

== Member Schools ==
School	Location (Population)	Nickname(s)	Colors	Football Coop	Enrollment	IHSA Class
Agape Christian High School	Marion, Illinois (17,193)	Knights; Lady Knights	Black; White	No	N/A	*
Century High School	Ullin, Illinois (463)	Centurions; Lady Centurions	Cardinal; White	No	122	1A
Cobden High School	Cobden, Illinois (1,157)	Appleknockers	Maroon; White	No	184	1A
Dongola High School	Dongola, Illinois (726)	Demons; Lady Demons	Red; White; Black	No	78	1A
Egyptian High School	Tamms, Illinois (1,043)	Pharaohs; Lady Pharaohs	Red; White; Blue	No	94	1A
Elverado High School	Elkville, Illinois (928)	Falcons; Lady Falcons	Blue; Gold	Coop with Murphysboro	110.5	1A
Joppa-Maple Grove High School	Joppa, Illinois (360)	Rangers; Lady rangers	Kelly Green; White; Gold	Coop with Metropolis (Massac County)	69.5	1A
Meridian High School	Mounds, Illinois (810)	Bobcats; Lady Bobcats	Scarlet; White; Gray	No	118	1A
Shawnee High School	Wolf Lake, Illinois (294)	Redskins; Lady Reds	Red; White; Black	No	83.5	1A

- Agape Christian is an IHSA approved member only and not IHSA post season eligible.

== Former Members ==
School	Location	Nickname(s)	Colors	Year Departed	Current Conference
Goreville High School	Goreville, Illinois	Blackcats; Lady Blackcats	Gold; Black	2012	Black Diamond Conference
Vienna High School	Vienna, Illinois	Eagles; Lady Eagles	Royal Blue; Orange	2008	Black Diamond Conference
