= Black Diamond Conference =

Illinois high school athletic conference

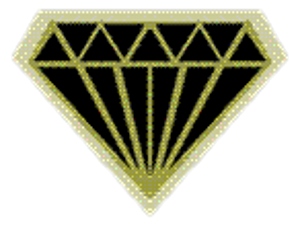
- Conference: IHSA
- Founded: 1949
- Sports fielded: 13 (boys: 7; girls: 6)
- No. of teams: 13
- Region: Southern Illinois
- Website: Black Diamond Conference

Locations
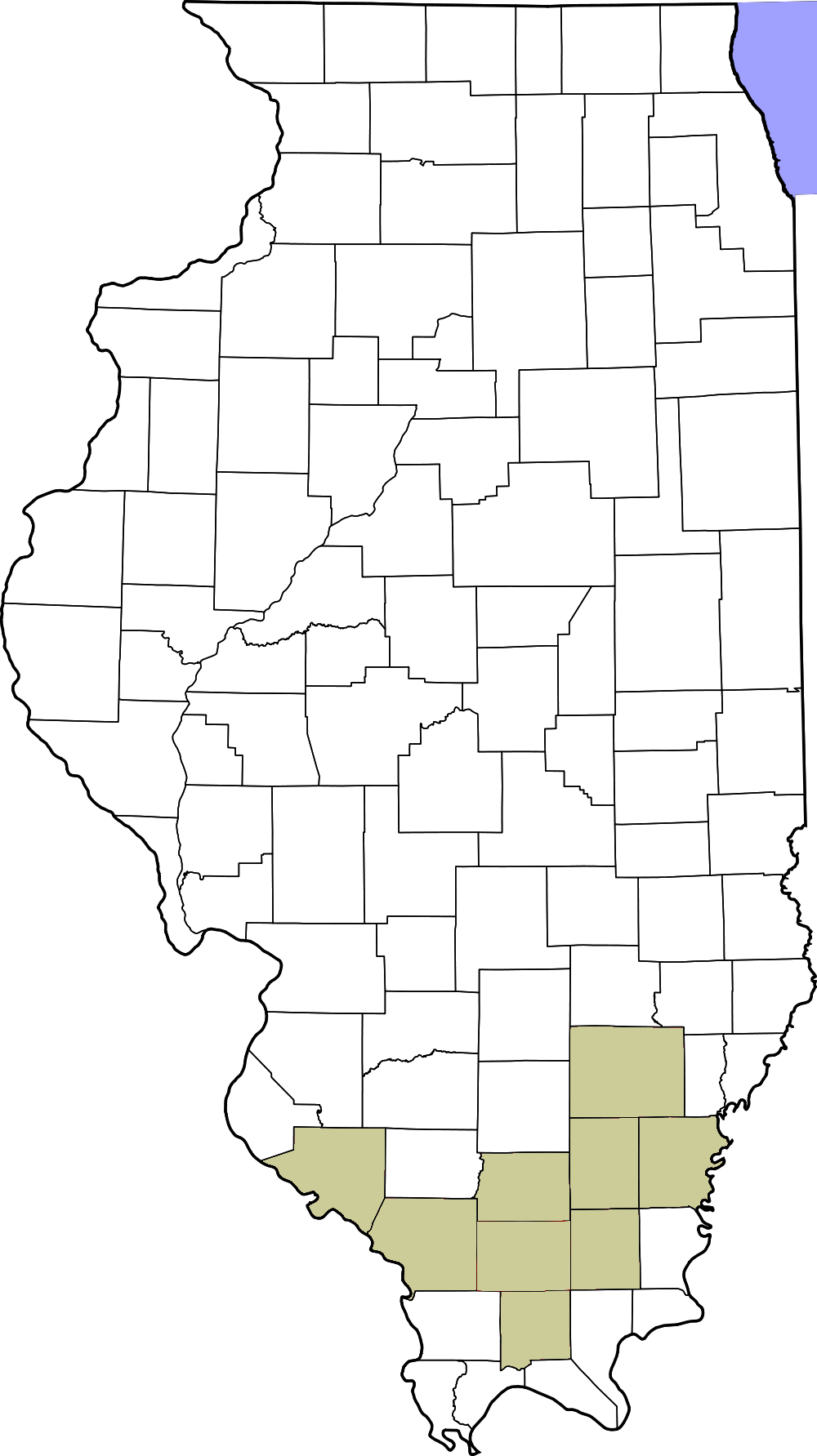

The Black Diamond Athletic Conference (BDC) is a high school athletic conference represented by 13 schools in the southern portion of Illinois. The conference currently offers championships for girls in basketball, cross country, golf, softball, track and field, and volleyball. In boys' sports, the BDC offers championships in baseball, basketball, cross country, football, golf, track and field, and wrestling.

== History ==
=== 1949-1968 ===
The Black Diamond Conference was created first as a football-only conference in 1949. The original schools were members of the Coal Belt Conference for other sports. The original conference schools were Carterville, Christopher, Elkville, Sesser, and Zeigler.

In 1956, the Black Diamond added Boys' Basketball and the conference became full-time.

Carbondale University High, a charter member of the Coal Belt Conference, joined the conference in 1963 and remained a member until its closure in 1966.

In 1962, Elkville High School consolidated with Vergennes and Dowell to become Elverado High School. Zeigler High School consolidated with Royalton High School to become Zeigler-Royalton High School.

In 1963, Sesser High School consolidated with Valier High School to become Sesser-Valier High School.

=== 1968-2003 ===
Trico (Campbell Hill) joined the Black Diamond in 1968 -69 season and won three consecutive BDC Basketball Titles. They left the BDC after the 1970–71 season after failing to start a football program.

Carterville and Christopher left the BDC to join the Southern Illini Conference after the 1973 season and returned in 1975. There was no football race in 1974 and no basketball races in 1974-75 and 1975-76.

Johnston City joined the conference in 1975.

McLeansboro (now Hamilton County) joined for football only in 1990 when Christopher and Zeigler-Royalton combined their football programs.

Cairo and Eldorado joined in 1992 for football only.

Eldorado would later join for girls' basketball and both boys' and girls' track and field in 1992 and girls' volleyball in 1995

McLeansboro joined the BDC for baseball and both boys' and girls' track and field in 1992 and girls' volleyball in 1995.

=== 2003 expansion ===
The 2003–2004 school year saw the largest single expansion in conference history. Carmi-White County and Fairfield joined from the defunct North Egypt Conference and former member Trico rejoined the conference. Cairo, Eldorado, and Hamilton County became full-time members by joining the conference for all sports.

The conference was divided into two divisions, East and West. The West Division consisted of the original five members Carterville, Christopher, Elverado, Sesser-Valier, and Zeigler-Royalton and new member Trico. The East consisted of five new members Cairo, Carmi-White County, Eldorado, Fairfield, and Hamilton County and current member Johnston City.

The conference also began to crown a champion from each division in Basketball and Volleyball. All other sports have one champion. The Diamond Duels in Basketball puts the 6 teams in each division against each other for Bragging Rights. The Duels have no outcome on Conference Champions.

=== Recent Years 2004-Present ===
Cairo High School left the conference at the end of the 2007–2008 school year and Vienna High School joined the conference in the 2008–2009 school year.

Carterville left the BDC at the conclusion of the 2009–2010 school year to the Southern Illinois River-to-River Conference. Chester High School took their place in the BDC.

With Carterville leaving the conference, the Black Diamond has dropped Wrestling as a Conference sport as only 3 schools now have wrestling programs.

Goreville High School joined the BDC for the 2011–2012 school year as a member of the BDC West Division.

Elverado left the BDC at the conclusion of the 2013–14 school year due to dropping their football program. Elverado joined the South Egyptian Conference and has started a football Co-op with Du Quoin High School with Du Quoin being the host.

Edwards County High School joins the BDC in 2014-15 as a Baseball and Softball member and will compete in the New BDC East Divisions of those sports. Edwards Co. will join the BDC Full-Time in the 2016–17 school year with all schools in the BDC East and Vienna will move to the BDC West.

Chester left the BDC at the conclusion of the 2020-21 school year. Chester joined the Cahokia Conference.

Flora High School joined starting the 2021-22 school year. They joined from the Little Illini Conference.

== Members ==
=== Current members ===
School	Location (Population)	Nickname(s)	Colors	Years Member	Enrollment (2017/18)	Additional Information
Eastern Division
Carmi-White County High School	Carmi, Illinois (5,240)	Bulldogs; Lady Bulldogs	Maroon; White	2003–Present	370	
Edwards County High School	Albion, Illinois (1,933)	Lions	Red; Black	2014–2015 (affiliate) 2016-Present	280	
Eldorado High School	Eldorado, Illinois (4,122)	Eagles	Purple; Gold	1992-2003 (affiliate); 2003–Present	358	
Fairfield Community High School	Fairfield, Illinois (5,154)	Mules; Lady Mules	Red; Black	2003–Present	423	
Flora High School	Flora, Illinois (5,070)	Wolves; Wolfgals	Orange; Blue	2021–Present	372	
Hamilton County Senior High School	McLeansboro, Illinois (2,883)	Foxes; Lady Foxes	Kelly Green; White	1990-2003 (affiliate); 2003–Present	376	Named McLeansboro High School prior to opening of current campus in 2001.
Western Division
Christopher High School	Christopher, Illinois (2,382)	Bearcats; Lady Cats	Blue; Orange	1949-1973; 1975–Present	234	
Goreville High School	Goreville, Illinois (938)	Blackcats	Gold; Black	2011–Present	192	
Johnston City High School	Johnston City, Illinois (3,543)	Indians; Lady Indians	Red; Black	1975–Present	334	
Sesser-Valier High School	Sesser, Illinois (2,128)	Red Devils	Maroon; White	1963–Present	206	Co-ops with Waltonville in Baseball and Golf, but competes outside of conference play.
Trico High School	Campbell Hill, Illinois (333)	Pioneers; Lady Pioneers	Blue; Gold	1968-1971; 2003–Present	292	Trico Community Unit District 176 covers an area of 250 square miles. The district lies in portions of the Illinois counties of Jackson, Perry, and Randolph and serves the communities of Ava, Campbell Hill, Cutler, Gorham, Jacob, Percy, Rockwood, and Willisville.
Vienna High School	Vienna, Illinois (1,434)	Eagles; Lady Eagles	Royal Blue; Orange	2008–Present	356	
Zeigler-Royalton High School	Zeigler, Illinois (1,801)	Tornadoes	Navy Blue; White	1962–Present	180	

=== Affiliate Member ===
School	Location	Nickname(s)	Colors	Years Member	Additional Information
Red Hill High School	Bridgeport, Illinois	Salukis	Red; Blue; White	2025-Present	Replacing Vienna-Goreville in Football only starting in the Fall of 2025. Was a member of the Little Illini Conference (Football). Red Hill will play all other sports in the Midland Trail Conference and Little Okaw Valley Conference.

=== Cooperative Programs ===
Team Name	Schools	Sports	Host	Nickname(s)	Colors	Enrollment (2017/18)
Christopher-Zeigler-Royalton	Christopher; Zeigler-Royalton	Football, Track and Field	Christopher	Bearcats; Lady Cats	Blue; Orange	414
Eldorado-Galatia	Eldorado; Galatia	Cross Country, Golf, Track and Field	Eldorado	Eagles	Purple; Gold	477
Sesser-Valier-Waltonville	Sesser-Valier; Waltonville	Girls' Basketball, Track and Field, Volleyball, Football 1992-2002, 2018-	Sesser-Valier	Red Devils	Maroon; White	330
Vienna-Goreville	Goreville; Vienna	Football	Vienna	Eagles	Royal Blue; Orange	548
Zeigler-Royalton-Christopher	Christopher; Zeigler-Royalton	Baseball, Golf, Softball (Girls' Basketball Co-op ended after 2014-15 School Year)	Zeigler-Royalton	Tornadoes	Navy Blue; White	414

=== Former members ===
School	Location	Nickname(s)	Colors	Years Member	Additional Information
Cairo Junior / Senior High School	Cairo, Illinois	Pilots; Co-Pilots	Blue; White	1992-2003 (affiliate); 2003-2008	Independent team
Carbondale University High School	Carbondale, Illinois	Lynx	Maroon; Gray	1963–1968	Closed in 1968.
Carterville High School	Carterville, Illinois	Lions; Lady Lions	Navy Blue; Orange	1949-1973; 1975-2010	Current member of the Southern Illinois River-to-River Conference.
Chester High School	Chester, Illinois (8,400)	Yellow Jackets; Lady Yellow Jackets	Orange; Black	2010–2020	Current member of the Cahokia Conference.
Elkville High School	Elkville, Illinois	Bluebirds	Blue; White	1949-1962	Consolidated with Vergennes and Dowell to form Elverado.
Elverado High School	Elkville, Illinois	Falcons; Lady Falcons	Blue; Gold	1962–2014	Elverado dropped football program and left the BDC. Current member of the South Egyptian Conference.
Sesser High School	Sesser, Illinois	Red Devils	Maroon; White	1949-1963	Consolidated with Valier to form Sesser-Valier.
Zeigler High School	Zeigler, Illinois	Purple Tornadoes	Purple; White	1949-1962	Consolidated with Royalton to form Zeigler-Royalton.

== Sports ==
=== Fall ===
==== Cross Country ====
Cross Country has been a BDC sport since the 2003 expansion. The conference champion is determined by the winner of the conference meet.

BDC Cross Country Champions
Year	Boys Champion	Girls Champion
2003	Hamilton County	Hamilton County
2004	Hamilton County	Hamilton County
2005	Hamilton County	Hamilton County
2006	Eldorado	Hamilton County
2007	Eldorado	Carmi-White County
2008	Eldorado	Carmi-White County
2009	Eldorado	Hamilton County
2010	Chester	Chester
2011	Chester	Chester
2012	Fairfield	Chester
2013	Chester	Chester
2014	Fairfield	Chester
2015	Hamilton County	Hamilton County
2016	Hamilton County	Chester
2017	Hamilton County	Chester
2018	Hamilton County	Hamilton County
2019	Hamilton County	Goreville
2020	No champion	No champion
2021	Fairfield	Hamilton County
2022	Fairfield	Fairfield
2023		Fairfield
2024	Fairfield	Fairfield

==== Football ====
The BDC was founded as a football-only conference and a title has been awarded in all but two years, 1974 and 75, since.

Currently there are ten BDC football programs. Six schools compete individually and 2 pairs, Christopher-Zeigler-Royalton and Vienna-Goreville, compete as co-op programs. Sesser-Valier co-ops with non-conference members Waltonville High School while new member Edwards County who joins in 2016 currently co-ops with Grayville High School. The BDC currently has a 9-game biennial rotating schedule with all programs playing each other once. Week 5, known as rivals week, however, does not rotate and has the same match-ups each year. These match-ups are as follows.

Rivals Week
Carmi-White County	Fairfield
Flora	Johnston City
Christopher-Zeigler-Royalton	Sesser-Valier-Waltonville
Eldorado	Hamilton County
Edwards County	Red Hill

BDC schools have also had moderate success at the state level winning two state titles, Zeigler-Royalton in 1982 and Carterville in 1996.

BDC Football Champions
Year	Champion(s)
1949	Christopher
1950	Christopher
1951	Christopher
1952	Elkville
1953	Elkville
1954	Elkville
1955	Elkville; Zeigler
1956	Zeigler
1957	Sesser
1958	Zeigler
1959	Christopher
1960	Elkville
1961	Elkville; Sesser
1962	Zeigler-Royalton
1963	Carbondale University; Christopher
1964	Christopher
1965	Carbondale University
1966	Sesser-Valier
1967	Christopher
1968	Christopher
1969	Christopher; Sesser-Valier
1970	Christopher
1971	Christopher
1972	Carterville
1973	Carterville
1974	No Race
1975	Carterville
1976	Carterville
1977	Carterville
1978	Carterville
1979	Christopher
1980	Christopher; Sesser-Valier
1981	Carterville
1982	Zeigler-Royalton
1983	Carterville
1984	Johnston City; Zeigler-Roylaton
1985	Zeigler-Royalton
1986	Johnston City
1987	Carterville
1988	Johnston City
1989	Carterville
1990	Christopher-Zeigler-Royalton
1991	Sesser-Valier
1992	Johnston City
1993	Johnston City
1994	Johnston City
1995	Carterville; Johnston City
1996	Carterville
1997	Christopher-Zeigler-Royalton
1998	Sesser-Valier
1999	Carterville
2000	Carterville
2001	Johnston City
2002	Carterville
2003	Carmi-White Co.
2004	Carterville
2005	Carmi-White Co.
2006	Carterville; Johnston City
2007	Carterville
2008	Carterville
2009	Sesser-Valier-Waltonville-Woodlawn
2010	Johnston City
2011	Carmi-White Co.
2012	Chester
2013	Chester; Fairfield
2014	Chester; Johnston City
2015	Eldorado
2016	Eldorado; Fairfield
2017	Fairfield
2018	Fairfield
2019	Fairfield
2020 (Spring COVID season)	Fairfield; Johnston City
2021	Johnston City
2022	Johnston City
2023	Sesser-Valier-Waltonville
2024	Johnston City

==== Golf ====
Golf was added after the 2003 expansion. The title is awarded to the winner of the conference tournament at season's end.

BDC Golf Champions
Year	Boys Champion	Girls Champion
2003	Carmi-White County	Trico
2004	Carterville	Trico
2005	Carterville	Carterville
2006	Carterville	Carterville
2007	Carmi-White County	Carmi-White County
2008	Fairfield	Carterville
2009	Hamilton County	Eldorado
2010	Hamilton County	Carmi-White County
2011	Hamilton County	Eldorado
2012	Hamilton County	Eldorado
2013	Carmi-White County	Eldorado
2014	Hamilton County	Eldorado
2015	Hamilton County	Carmi-White County
2016	Hamilton County	Trico
2017	Hamilton County	Trico
2018	Carmi-White County	Hamilton County
2019	Carmi-White County	Hamilton County
2020	Carmi-White County	Zeigler-Royalton-Christopher
2021	Trico	Zeigler-Royalton-Christopher
2022	Flora	Hamilton Co.
2023		
2024	Edwards Co.	Trico

==== Volleyball ====
The BDC began awarding a volleyball championship during the 1994 season. Since 2003 each division has had separate champion determined by regular season conference records. Between 2003 and 2005, the BDC held a conference tournament. In 2006 the tournament was replaced with the Diamond Duels format used in basketball. The Diamond Duels pitted the East Division vs the West Division. Teams would play the team in the same conference standing from the other division. The BDC Tournament and Diamond Duels had no effect on the conference championship.

BDC Volleyball Champions
Year		Champion(s)
1994		Carterville
1995		McLeansboro
1996		McLeansboro
1997		Eldorado
1998		Sesser-Valier
1999		Sesser-Valier
2000		Sesser-Valier
2001		Sesser-Valier
2002		Sesser-Valier
2003	East	Fairfield
2003	West	Trico
2004	East	Fairfield; Hamilton County
2004	West	Trico
2005	East	Hamilton County
2005	West	Carterville
2006	East	Fairfield
2006	West	Carterville
2007	East	Fairfield
2007	West	Carterville
2008	East	Fairfield
2008	West	Sesser-Valier
2009	East	Fairfield
2009	West	Trico
2010	East	Fairfield; Hamilton County
2010	West	Christopher
2011	East	Hamilton County
2011	West	Trico
2012	East	Fairfield; Hamilton County
2012	West	Christopher
2013	East	Hamilton County
2013	West	Christopher; Trico
2014	East	Hamilton County
2014	West	Trico
2015	East	Carmi-White County
2015	West	Trico
2016	East	Edwards County
2016	West	Chester
2017	East	Edwards County
2017	West	Chester; Trico
2018	East	Edwards County; Fairfield
2018	West	Trico
2019	East	Fairfield
2019	West	Trico
2020	East	
2020	West	
2021	East	
2021	West	
2022	East	
2022	West	
2023	East	Fairfield
2023	West	Trico
2024	East	Carmi-White Co.
2024	West	

=== Winter ===
==== Basketball ====
===== Boys =====
Boys basketball has been contested since the 1955–56 school year. A champion was crowned every year except for 1974-75 and 1975-76. The conference split into East and West Divisions with the 2003–04 school year when the conference expanded. The conference hosted "Diamond Duels," which pitted teams from each division playing the team with the same conference standing in the other division from 2004–05 to 2010-11.

BDC Boys Basketball Champions
Year		Champion(s)
1955-56		Sesser
1956-57		Christopher; Sesser
1957-58		Sesser; Zeigler
1958-59		Zeigler
1959-60		Elkville
1960-61		Elkville
1961-62		Elkville
1962-63		Elverado; Zeigler-Royalton
1963-64		Elverado; Sesser-Valier; Zeigler-Royalton
1964-65		Zeigler-Royalton
1965-66		Carbondale University
1966-67		Carbondale University
1967-68		Carterville
1968-69		Trico
1969-70		Trico
1970-71		Trico
1971-72		Zeigler-Royalton
1972-73		Christopher
1973-74		Christopher; Zeigler-Royalton
1974-75		No Race
1975-76		No Race
1976-77		Johnston City
1977-78		Johnston City
1978-79		Zeigler-Royalton
1979-80		Zeigler-Royalton
1980-81		Sesser-Valier
1981-82		Zeigler-Royalton
1982-83		Carterville; Zeigler-Royalton
1983-84		Carterville
1984-85		Johnston City
1985-86		Sesser-Valier
1986-87		Carterville
1987-88		Carterville
1988-89		Christopher; Sesser-Valier
1989-90		Christopher; Sesser-Valier
1990-91		Sesser-Valier
1991-92		Sesser-Valier
1992-93		Carterville; Johnston City; Sesser-Valier
1993-94		Sesser-Valier
1994-95		Carterville; Sesser-Valier
1995-96		Carterville
1996-97		Sesser-Valier
1997-98		Christopher; Johnston City
1998-99		Johnston City
1999-00		Johnston City
2000-01		Sesser-Valier
2001-02		Johnston City
2002-03		Carterville
2003-04	East	Cairo
2003-04	West	Sesser-Valier
2004-05	East	Fairfield
2004-05	West	Carterville
2005-06	East	Carmi-White Co. Eldorado
2005-06	West	Carterville; Christopher
2006-07	East	Eldorado
2006-07	West	Trico
2007-08	East	Eldorado
2007-08	West	Sesser-Valier
2008-09	East	Eldorado
2008-09	West	Sesser-Valier; Trico
2009-10	East	Carmi-White Co. Hamilton Co.
2009-10	West	Trico
2010-11	East	Fairfield
2010-11	West	Trico
2011-12	East	Fairfield
2011-12	West	Goreville
2012-13	East	Fairfield; Johnston City
2012-13	West	Goreville
2013-14	East	Carmi-White Co. Fairfield
2013-14	West	Sesser-Valier; Trico
2014-15	East	Fairfield
2014-15	West	Christopher; Sesser-Valier; Trico
2015-16	East	Carmi-White Co.
2015-16	West	Christopher
2016-17	East	Eldorado
2016-17	West	Goreville
2017-18	East	Eldorado
2017-18	West	Sesser-Valier
2018-19	East	Fairfield
2018-19	West	Chester
2019-20	East	Fairfield
2019-20	West	Goreville
2020-21	East	Fairfield
2020-21	West	Goreville
2021-22	East	Hamilton Co.
2021-22	West	Goreville; Sesser-Valier; Vienna
2022-23	East	Carmi-White Co.
2022-23	West	Vienna
2023-24	East	Carmi-White Co.
2023-24	West	Goreville; Vienna
2024-25	East	
2024-25	West	Goreville

===== Girls =====
Girls basketball has been contested since the 1978–79 school year. The conference split into East and West Divisions with the 2003–04 school year when the conference expanded. The Conference hosted "Diamond Duels" which pitted teams from each division playing the team with the same conference standing in the other division from 2004–05 to 2010-11.

BDC Girls Basketball Champions
Year		Champion(s)
1978-79		Zeigler-Royalton
1979-80		Carterville
1980-81		Sesser-Valier
1981-82		Zeigler-Royalton
1982-83		Zeigler-Royalton
1983-84		Carterville; Christopher; Sesser-Valier
1984-85		Sesser-Valier
1985-86		Elverado; Johnston City
1986-87		Elverado
1987-88		Sesser-Valier
1988-89		Carterville; Elverado
1989-90		Sesser-Valier
1990-91		Elverado; Zeigler-Royalton-Christopher
1991-92		Sesser-Valier
1992-93		Sesser-Valier
1993-94		Johnston City; Sesser-Valier
1994-95		Carterville
1995-96		Eldorado
1996-97		Eldorado
1997-98		Eldorado
1998-99		Eldorado
1999-00		Eldorado
2000-01		Sesser-Valier
2001-02		Sesser-Valier
2002-03		Sesser-Valier
2003-04	East	Hamilton County
2003-04	West	Carterville
2004-05	East	Hamilton County
2004-05	West	Carterville
2005-06	East	Hamilton County
2005-06	West	Zeigler-Royalton-Christopher
2006-07	East	Carmi-White County; Fairfield
2006-07	West	Carterville
2007-08	East	Carmi-White County
2007-08	West	Carterville
2008-09	East	Carmi-White County
2008-09	West	Sesser-Valier-Waltonville; Trico
2009-10	East	Vienna
2009-10	West	Sesser-Valier-Waltonville
2010-11	East	Vienna
2010-11	West	Zeigler-Royalton-Christopher
2011-12	East	Hamilton County; Vienna
2011-12	West	Goreville
2012-13	East	Eldorado; Hamilton County
2012-13	West	Goreville
2013-14	East	Eldorado; Hamilton County
2013-14	West	Sesser-Valier-Waltonville
2014-15	East	Hamilton County
2014-15	West	Sesser-Valier-Waltonville
2015-16	East	Johnston City
2015-16	West	Sesser-Valier-Waltonville
2016-17	East	Fairfield, Hamilton County
2016-17	West	Sesser-Valier-Waltonville
2017-18	East	Hamilton County
2017-18	West	Sesser-Valier-Waltonville
2018-19	East	Hamilton County
2018-19	West	Sesser-Valier-Waltonville
2019-20	East	Eldorado
2019-20	West	Goreville
2020-21	East	Hamilton County
2020-21	West	Christopher
2021-22	East	Fairfield
2021-22	West	Christopher
2022-23	East	Edwards Co.
2022-23	West	Christopher
2023-24	East	Carmi-White Co.
2023-24	West	Goreville
2024-25	East	
2024-25	West	Vienna

==== Wrestling ====
Wrestling became a conference sport after the 2003 expansion and remained until after the 2009/10 season. Only four BDC schools — Carmi-White County, Carterville, Fairfield, and Johnston City — competed for the title, and Carmi-White County won all seven. All but one of the titles were awarded to the winner of the conference tournament held on the final weekend of the regular season. the 2010 title was awarded based on conference head-to-head records due to the tournament being canceled due to weather. Wrestling was removed as a conference sport after Carterville left the conference in 2010. Wrestling was reinstated as a conference sport during the 2020-21 school year.

BDC Wrestling Champions
Year	Champion
2003-04	Carmi-White Co.
2004-05	Carmi-White Co.
2005-06	Carmi-White Co.
2006-07	Carmi-White Co.
2007-08	Carmi-White Co.
2008-09	Carmi-White Co.
2009-10	Carmi-White Co.
2020-21	Fairfield
2021-22	Fairfield
2022-23	Fairfield
2023-24	Fairfield
2024-25	Johnston City

=== Spring ===
==== Baseball ====
BDC Baseball Champions
Year		Champion(s)
1991		Carterville
1992		Elverado; Johnston City; Zeigler-Royalton-Christopher
1993		Carterville; Elverado
1994		Carterville; Elverado; Zeigler-Royalton-Christopher
1995		Johnston City
1996		Zeigler-Royalton-Christopher
1997		Carterville
1998		Carterville
1999		Carterville; McLeansboro
2000		Carterville
2001		Carterville
2002		Carterville
2003		Carterville
2004		Carmi-White County
2005		Carmi-White County
2006		Carmi-White County; Trico
2007		Eldorado
2008		Carterville
2009		Zeigler-Royalton-Christopher
2010		Carterville
2011		Trico
2012		Chester; Johnston City
2013		Chester; Goreville
2014		Chester
2015	East	Johnston City
2015	West	Chester
2016	East	Carmi-White County
2016	West	Goreville
2017	East	Edwards County; Fairfield
2017	West	Goreville
2018	East	Fairfield
2018	West	Goreville
2019	East	
2019	West	
2020	East	
2020	West	
2021	East	
2021	West	
2022	East	
2022	West	
2023	East	
2023	West	
2024	East	
2024	West	
2025	East	
2025	West	

==== Softball ====
BDC Softball Champions
Year		Champion(s)
1977-78		Zeigler-Royalton
1978-79		Johnston City
1979-80		Johnston City
1980-81		Carterville
1981-82		Elverado
1982-83		Zeigler-Royalton
1983-84		Christopher
1984-85		Zeigler-Royalton
1985-86		Zeigler-Royalton
1986-87		Zeigler-Royalton
1987-88		Zeigler-Royalton
1988-89		Elverado; Zeigler-Royalton
1989-90		Elverado
1990-91		Elverado
1991-92; Last Year of Fall Conference		Johnston City
1993		Johnston City
1994		Johnston City
1995		Johnston City
1996		Johnston City
1997		Elverado; Johnston City
1998		Johnston City
1999		Johnston City
2000		Johnston City
2001		Johnston City
2002		Johnston City
2003		Johnston City
2004		Johnston City
2005		Johnston City
2006		Carmi-White County; Carterville; Johnston City
2007		Johnston City
2008		Carmi-White County; Carterville; Johnston City
2009		Carterville; Johnston City
2010		Johnston City
2011		Carmi-White County; Johnston City; Vienna
2012		Carmi-White County; Goreville
2013		Carmi-White County
2014		Carmi-White County
2015	East	Carmi-White County
2015	West	Trico
2016	East	Carmi-White County
2016	West	Trico
2017	East	Carmi-White County
2017	West	Trico
2018	East	Edwards County
2018	West	Trico
2019	East	
2019	West	
2020	East	
2020	West	
2021	East	
2021	West	
2022	East	
2022	West	
2023	East	
2023	West	
2024	East	
2024	West	
2025	East	
2025	West	

==== Track and Field ====
BDC Track & Field Champions
Year	Boys Champion	Girls Champion
1955	Christopher	
1956	Christopher	
1957	Christopher	
1958	Christopher	
1960	Christopher	
1961	Christopher	
1962	Christopher	
1963	Christopher	
1964	Christopher	
1965	Christopher	
1966	Zeigler-Royalton	
1967	Christopher	
1968	Christopher	
1969	Christopher	
1970	Christopher	
1971	Christopher	
1972	Trico	
1973	Christopher	
1974	Christopher	
1975	No Meet	
1976	Carterville	
1977	Carterville	Zeigler-Royalton; First Year of Girls' Meet
1978	Carterville	Zeigler-Royalton
1979	Carterville	Carterville
1980	Carterville	Carterville
1981	Carterville	Carterville
1982	Carterville	Carterville
1983	Christopher	Carterville
1984	Christopher	Carterville
1985	Carterville	Carterville
1986	Carterville	Carterville
1987	Carterville	Carterville
1988	Carterville	Carterville
1989	Sesser-Valier	Carterville
1990	Christopher	Carterville
1991	Christopher-Zeigler-Royalton	Carterville
1992	Carterville	Carterville
1993	Carterville	Carterville
1994	Eldorado	Christopher-Zeigler-Royalton
1995	Carterville	Carterville
1996	Carterville	Carterville
1997	Carterville	Carterville
1998	Christopher-Zeigler-Royalton	McLeansboro
1999	Carterville	McLeansboro
2000	Carterville	Carterville
2001	Carterville	Carterville
2002	Carterville	Carterville
2003	Carterville	Carterville
2004	Carterville	Carterville
2005	Carterville	Carterville
2006	Carterville	Carterville
2007	Carterville	Carmi-White County
2008	Carterville	Carmi-White County
2009	Fairfield	Carmi-White County
2010	Carterville	Fairfield
2011	Carmi-White County	Chester
2012	Carmi-White County; Chester	Chester
2013	Chester	Chester
2014	Fairfield	Chester
2015	Fairfield	Chester
2016	Fairfield	Chester
2017	Fairfield	Chester
2018	Vienna	Chester
2019	Vienna	Christopher-Zeigler-Royalton
2020		
2021		
2022		
2023		
2024		
2025		

== Champions ==
Season	Sport		2014/15 Champion(s)	2013/14 Champion(s)	Most Championships
Boys' Sports
Fall	Cross Country		Fairfield (2)	Chester (3)	Hamilton County (8)
Fall	Football		Johnston City (11); Chester (3)	Chester (2); Fairfield (1)	Carterville (19)
Fall	Golf		Hamilton County (5)	Carmi-White County (3)	Carmi-White County (6)
Winter	Basketball	East	Fairfield (6)	Carmi-White Co. (3); Fairfield (5)	Sesser-Valier (21)
Winter	Basketball	West	Christopher (6); Sesser-Valier (18); Trico (9)	Sesser-Valier (17); Trico (8)	Sesser-Valier (21)
Spring	Baseball	East	Johnston City (4)	Only 1 Division in 2013/14.	Carterville (12)
Spring	Baseball	West	Chester (4)	Chester (3)	Carterville (12)
Spring	Track and Field		Fairfield (3)	Fairfield (2)	Carterville (27)
Girls' Sports
Fall	Cross Country		Chester (5)	Chester (4)	Hamilton County (8)
Fall	Golf		Eldorado (5)	Eldorado (4)	Eldorado (5)
Fall	Volleyball	East	Hamilton County (9)	Hamilton County (8)	Fairfield (10); Trico (10)
Fall	Volleyball	West	Trico (6)	Christopher (3); Trico (5)	Fairfield (10); Trico (10)
Winter	Basketball	East	Hamilton County (7)	Eldorado (7); Hamilton County (6)	Sesser-Valier (19)
Winter	Basketball	West	Sesser-Valier (15)	Sesser-Valier (14)	Sesser-Valier (19)
Spring	Softball	East	Carmi-White County (7)	Carmi-White County (6)	Johnston City (22)
Spring	Softball	West	Trico (1)	Only 1 Division in 2013/14.	Johnston City (22)
Spring	Track and Field		Chester (5)	Chester (4)	Carterville (25)

=== Former championships ===
Season	Sport	Years Held	Most Recent Champion	Most Championships
Winter	Wrestling	2003/04-2009/10	Carmi-White County	Carmi-White County (7)

=== Championships by school ===
School	Baseball	Basketball		Cross Country		Football	Golf		Softball	Track and Field		Volleyball	Wrestling	Totals		
School	Baseball	Boys	Girls	Boys	Girls	Football	Boys	Girls	Softball	Boys	Girls	Volleyball	Wrestling	Boys	Girls	Overall
Carmi-White County	4	3	3	0	2	3	6	2	9	2	3	0	7	25	19	44
Chester	4	1	0	3	7	3	0	0	0	2	8	2	^{†}	13	17	30
Christopher	0^{‡}	8	2^{‡}	^{†}	^{†}	13^{‡}	^{†‡}	^{†‡}	1^{‡}	20^{‡}	0^{‡}	3	^{†}	41	5	46
Edwards County	1	0^{*}	0^{*}	^{†}	^{†}	0^{*}	^{†}	^{†}	1	^{†}	^{†}	3	^{†}	1	4	5
Eldorado	1	6	8	4	0	0	0	5	0	1	0	1	^{†}	12	14	26
Fairfield	2	9	1	3	0	5	1	0	0	3	1	10	4	23	12	35
Goreville	3	5	3	0	1	^{†‡}	0	0	1	0	0	0	0	8	5	13
Hamilton County	1	1	11	8	8	0	5	2	0	0	2	9	^{†}	15	33	48
Johnston City	4	9	2	^{†}	^{†}	13	0	0	22	0	0	0	1	27	24	51
Sesser-Valier	0^{*}	21	19	^{†}	^{†}	8	^{†}	^{†}	0^{*}	1	0	6	^{†}	30	25	55
Trico	2	9	1	^{†}	^{†}	^{†}	1	2	4	1	^{†}	10	0	13	17	30
Vienna	0	0	3	0	0	^{†‡}	0	0	1	2	0	0	^{†}	2	4	6
Zeigler-Royalton	0^{‡}	11	3^{‡}	^{†}	^{†}	7^{‡}	0^{‡}	0^{‡}	7^{‡}	1^{‡}	2^{‡}	0	^{†}	19	12	31
Intraconference Cooperative Programs
Christopher-Z-R	4		3			2	0	2	0	3	2			9	7	16
Vienna-Goreville						0								0		0
Former Members
Cairo	0	1	0	^{†}	^{†}	0	^{†}	^{†}	0	0	0	^{†}	^{†}	1	0	1
Carbondale University	^{†}	2	^{†}	^{†}	^{†}	2	^{†}	^{†}	^{†}	0	^{†}	^{†}	^{†}	4	0	4
Carterville	12	11	8	0	0	19	3	3	4	27	25	4	0	72	44	116
Elverado	3	5	4	^{†}	^{†}	6	^{†}	^{†}	5	0^{*}	0^{*}	0	^{†}	14	9	23

- Championships won by Elkville, Sesser, and Zeigler are combined with Elverado, Sesser-Valier, and Zeigler-Royalton, respectively.
- ^{*}Does not currently compete in conference sanctioned play.
- ^{†}Has never competed in conference sanctioned play.
- ^{‡}Currently co-ops with another BDC school in conference sanctioned play.

== State titles ==
School	Sport	Titles	Years	Total
Carmi-White County	Boys' Golf	5	1975, 1976, 1977, 1978, 1979	5
Eldorado	Boys' Track and Field	1	1925	1
Goreville	Softball	1	2012	1
Hamilton County	Boys' Basketball	1	1984	1
Johnston City	Boys' Basketball	1	1929	1
Zeigler-Royalton	Football	1	1982	1
Former Members
Cairo	Boys' Track and Field	5	1983, 1985, 1988, 1990, 1992	5
Carterville	Football	1	1996	2
Carterville	Softball	1	2008	2
