= 2011 McDonald's All-American Girls Game =

East	West
78	66
	1st half	2nd half	Total
East	46	32	78
West	27	39	66
- Date: March 30, 2011
- Venue: United Center, Chicago, Illinois
- MVP: Elizabeth Williams
- Referees: Becky Blank; Marissa Whaley; Kevin Dillard
- Attendance: 19,899
- Network: ESPNU
- Announcers: Lou Canellis (play–by–play); Abby Waner (color commentator)

McDonald's All-American

The 2011 McDonald's All-American Girls Game is an All-star basketball game that was played on Wednesday, March 30, 2011, at the United Center in Chicago, Illinois, home of the Chicago Bulls. The game's rosters featured the best and most highly recruited high school girls graduating in 2011. The game is the 10th annual version of the McDonald's All-American Game first played in 2002.

== 2011 Game ==
All-star games are typically showcases for offense, not defense, but the 2011 event featured a defense described as vigorous. Not coincidentally, one of the players, Elizabeth Williams, who would go on to win the Most Outstanding Player award, likes to play defense. Despite her interest in defense, it was her offense that helped earn the award. With minutes left in the game, and a comfortable lead, the East coach pulled the starters, including Williams, to give the crowd a chance to applaud their performance. However, one of her teammates pointed out that her 22 points was a single point shy of the McDonald's scoring record. She was re-inserted in the game, and with 42 seconds left, scored on a layup to set the scoring record. The East team won the game 78–66.

=== 2011 East Roster ===
ESPNW 100 Rank	#	Name	Height	Weight (lbs.)	Position	Hometown	High School	College Choice
3	30	Cierra Burdick	6-2	170	F	Matthews, NC, U.S.	Butler High School	Tennessee
6	10	Briyona Canty	5-10	150	G	Hamilton, NJ, U.S.	Trenton Catholic Academy	Rutgers
13	14	Temi Fagbenle	6-4	168	C	Blairstown, NJ, U.S.	Blair Academy	Harvard
17	13	Bria Goss	5-11	155	G	Indianapolis, IN, U.S.	Ben Davis High School	Kentucky
12	00	Sara Hammond	6-2	178	F	Mount Vernon, KY, U.S.	Rockcastle County High School	Louisville
20	31	Amber Henson	6-4	180	C	Tampa, FL, U.S.	Sickles High School	Duke
11	44	Betnijah Laney	6-0	174	G	Smyrna, DE, U.S.	Smyrna High School	Rutgers
10	22	Samantha Logic	6-0	155	G	Racine, WI, U.S.	J.I. Case High School	Iowa
40	11	Ally Malott	6-2	180	F	Middletown, OH, U.S.	Madison High School	Dayton
4	1	Ariel Massengale	5-6	152	G	Bolingbrook, IL, U.S.	Bolingbrook High School	Tennessee
8	3	Bria Smith	5-10	150	G	Middle Village, NY, U.S.	Christ The King Regional High School	Louisville
2	15	Elizabeth Williams	6-3	198	F	Virginia Beach, VA, U.S.	Princess Anne High School	Duke

=== 2011 West Roster ===
ESPNW 100 Rank	#	Name	Height	Weight (lbs.)	Position	Hometown	High School	College Choice
24	13	Brianna Banks	5-9	145	G	Fayetteville, GA, U.S.	Fayette County High School	Connecticut
16	3	Ariya Crook-Williams	5-7	150	G	Long Beach, CA, U.S.	Long Beach Polytechnic High School	Southern Cal
5	12	Krystal Forthan	6-4	185	C	Georgetown, TX, U.S.	Georgetown High School	LSU
22	21	Reshanda Gray	6-3	180	F	Los Angeles, CA, U.S.	Washington Preparatory High School	Cal
7	35	Justine Hartman	6-3	180	C	Brea, CA, U.S.	Brea Olinda High School	UCLA
9	1	Morgan Jones	6-2	170	F	Lake Mary, FL, U.S.	Lake Mary High School	Northwestern
1	32	Kaleena Mosqueda-Lewis	6-0	175	G	Santa Ana, CA, U.S.	Mater Dei High School	Connecticut
15	10	Amber Orrange	5-8	145	G	Houston, TX, U.S.	Westbury Christian School	Stanford
36	4	Cassie Peoples	5-7	148	G	Cypress, TX, U.S.	Cy-Fair High School	Texas
61	41	Bonnie Samuelson	6-3	155	F	Huntington Beach, CA, U.S.	Edison High School	Stanford
42	40	Kiah Stokes	6-3	180	F	Marion, IA, U.S.	Linn-Mar High School	Connecticut
14	24	Alexyz Vaioletama	6-0	178	G	Santa Ana, CA, U.S.	Mater Dei High School	USC

=== Coaches ===
The East team was coached by:

- Head Coach Mary Coyle Klinger of Rutgers Preparatory School (Somerset, New Jersey)
- Asst Coach Anthony Pappas of Waterloo West High School (Waterloo, Iowa)
- Asst Coach Teri Morison of Carroll High School (Grapevine, Texas)

The West team was coached by:

- Head Coach Dorothy Gaters of Marshall High School (Chicago, Illinois)
- Asst Coach Gwen Howard of Marshall High School (Chicago, Illinois)
- Asst Coach Courtney Hargrays of Marshall High School (Chicago, Illinois)

== All-American Week ==
=== Schedule ===
- Monday, March 28: Powerade Jamfest
  - Slam Dunk Contest
  - Three-Point Shoot-out
  - Timed Basketball Skills Competition
- Wednesday, March 30: Girls All-American Game

== See also ==
2011 McDonald's All-American Boys Game
