= Royce Newman =

American football player (born 1997)

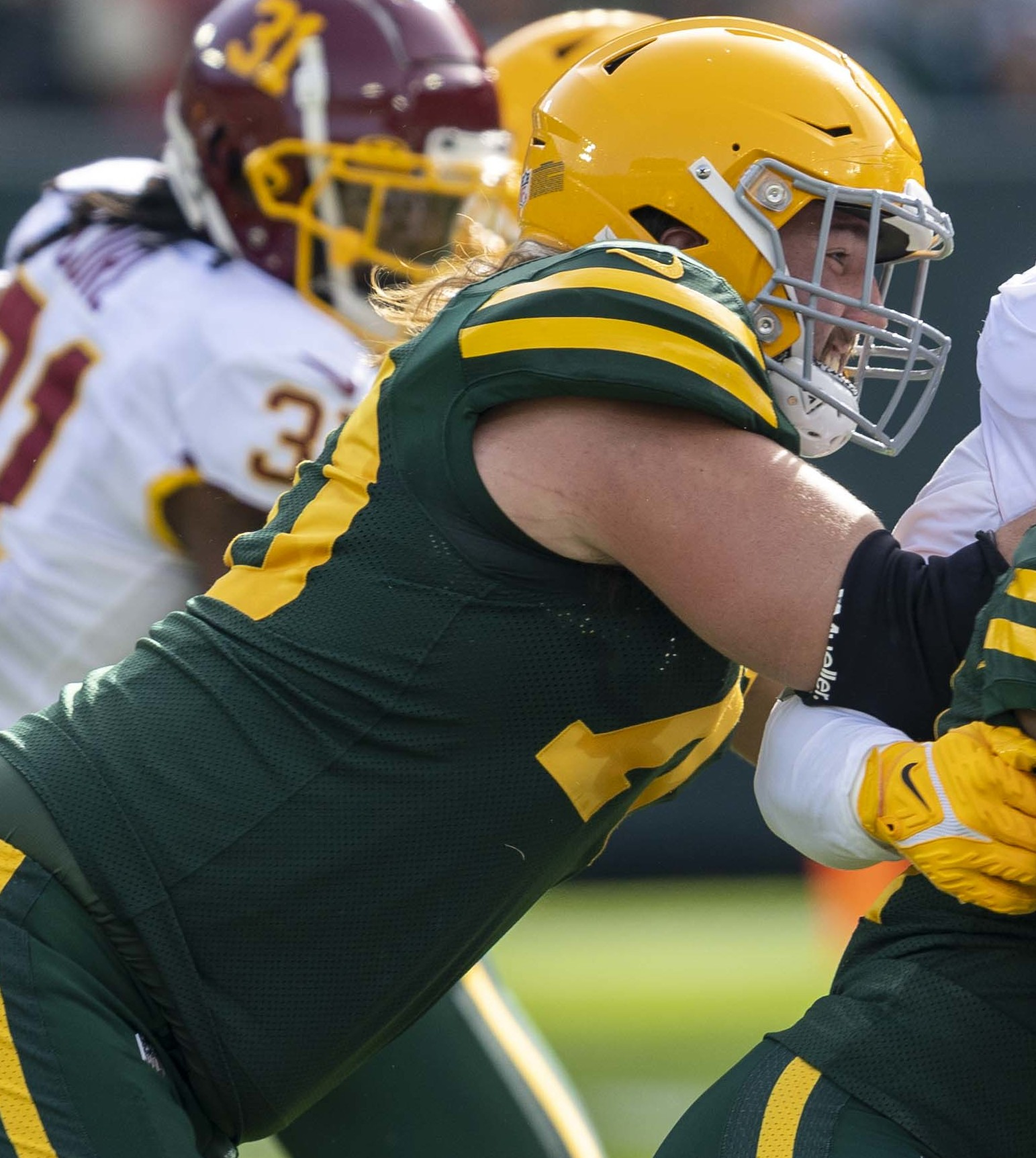
- Newman with the Green Bay Packers in 2021

Profile
- Position: Guard

Personal information
- Born: August 17, 1997 (age 29); Nashville, Illinois, U.S.
- Listed height: 6 ft 5 in (1.96 m)
- Listed weight: 310 lb (141 kg)

Career information
- High school: Nashville Community (IL)
- College: Ole Miss (2016–2020)
- NFL draft: 2021: 4th round, 142nd overall pick

Career history
- Green Bay Packers (2021–2023); Tampa Bay Buccaneers (2024); Arizona Cardinals (2025)*; New England Patriots (2025)*; Chicago Bears (2025)*; Los Angeles Rams (2025)*
- * Offseason or practice squad member only

Career NFL statistics as of 2024
- Games played: 52
- Games started: 24
- Stats at Pro Football Reference

Royce Dalton Newman (born August 17, 1997) is an American professional football guard for the Los Angeles Rams of the National Football League. He played college football for the Ole Miss Rebels.

== Professional career ==
Pre-draft measurables
Height	Weight	Arm length	Hand span	Wingspan	40-yard dash	10-yard split	20-yard split	20-yard shuttle	Three-cone drill	Vertical jump	Broad jump	Bench press
6 ft 5 1/4 in (1.96 m)	310 lb (141 kg)	33 3/4 in (0.86 m)	9 in (0.23 m)	6 ft 6 1/8 in (1.98 m)	5.15 s	1.75 s	2.91 s	4.75 s	7.91 s	28.0 in (0.71 m)	8 ft 8 in (2.64 m)	23 reps
All values from Pro Day

=== Green Bay Packers ===
Newman was selected 142nd overall by the Green Bay Packers in the 2021 NFL draft. He signed his rookie contract on May 14, 2021. He was released on August 27, 2024.

=== Tampa Bay Buccaneers ===
Newman was claimed off waivers by the Tampa Bay Buccaneers on August 28, 2024.

=== Arizona Cardinals ===
On March 21, 2025, Newman signed a one-year deal with the Arizona Cardinals. He was waived on August 26 as part of final roster cuts.

=== New England Patriots ===
On September 24, 2025, the New England Patriots signed Newman to the practice squad. He was released from the practice squad on October 7.

=== Chicago Bears ===
On October 29, 2025, Newman signed with the Chicago Bears practice squad. He was released on December 9.

=== Los Angeles Rams ===
On December 24, 2025, Newman was signed to the Los Angeles Rams practice squad.
