= Massac County High School =

High school in Illinois, United States

Coordinates: 37.1825°N 88.7221°W

Location
- 2841 Old Marion Road; Metropolis, (Massac County), Illinois 62960; United States

Information
- Type: Public high school
- Established: 1981
- Principal: Parker Windhorst
- Staff: 43.55 (FTE)
- Enrollment: 546 (2023-2024)
- Student to teacher ratio: 12.54
- Colors: Red, white and blue
- Athletics conference: SIRR
- Nickname: Patriots

Massac County High School is the only high school in the Massac Unit #1 school district, and one of two high schools in Massac County, Illinois. It was built in 1981 following the consolidation of the Brookport and Metropolis school districts. It currently serves over 600 students who come from the eastern portion of Massac County. The school's sports teams are known as the Patriots and Lady Patriots, for boys and girls respectively. Its colors are red, white, and blue.

== Departments ==
The high school currently consists of 9 departments and a functioning library.

- The Business Department teaches courses such as Accounting, Intro to Business, Computer Concepts, and basic Keyboarding.
- The English Department teaches four levels of English as well as AP English Language and Composition.
- The Math Department teaches Algebra, Geometry, Pre-Calculus, and Calculus.
- The Fine Arts Department includes Band, Choir, Pottery, Spanish, and German.
- The Physical Education Department has courses in Physical Education and Driver's Education.
- The Guidance Department assists students with college preparation and scholarship searches.
- The Science Department teaches AP Chemistry, AP Biology, Physical Science, and Health Science, among others.
- The Library currently has approximately 15,000 books and subscriptions to 28 magazines.
- The Social Studies Department teaches AP United States History, AP U.S. Government, Government, and World History, among others.
- The Vocational Department introduces students to courses in Health Occupations, Welding, Agriculture Science, and many others.

== Clubs and organizations ==
The high school also has many clubs and organizations in which students can get involved. They include the following:

- Biology Club
- Key Club
- National Honor Society
- Fellowship of Christian Athletes
- German Club
- Spanish Club
- Cultural Awareness Club
- Drama Club
- Marching Band

== Athletics ==
Massac County High School students have the opportunity to play a variety of sports, such as:

- Volleyball
- Baseball
- Softball
- Soccer
- football
- Basketball
- Golf
- Bowling
- Marching Band
- Track and field

== Academics ==
The graduating class of 2014 had a graduation rate within four years of 88%, which is above the state average of 86%. It is not as high as 91%, which it had been as recently as 2011, nor as low as 76%, as in 2012. Of the class of 2012, only 68% enrolled in a two or four-year college twelve months after graduation, nearly matching the state average of 69%. In 2014, 46% of students were deemed "college ready" by achieving a score of 21 on the ACT, matching the state average.

== Demographics ==
Unlike most of the state, the student body's racial/ethnic makeup has not changed significantly in the past five years. As of 2014, 84% of the student body is Caucasian, down slightly from 85% in 2011. Approximately 7% of students are African American, with another 2% reporting Hispanic ancestry, and 7% reporting two or more races.
