= Jim Ranchino =

American political scientist and pollster

- Born: James Lewis Ranchino; April 20, 1936; Herrin, Illinois, U.S.
- Died: November 7, 1978 (aged 42); Little Rock, Arkansas, U.S.
- Resting place: Rest Haven Memorial Gardens in Arkadelphia, Arkansas
- Education: Louisiana College; Texas Christian University; University of Wisconsin–Madison
- Occupations: Political consultant; Political scientist; Professor
- Years active: 1964–1978
- Spouse(s): Veda Ranchino, later Veda Ranchino Morgan
- Children: 2

James Lewis Ranchino (/rænˈkiːnoʊ/; April 20, 1936 – November 7, 1978), known as Jim Ranchino, was a pollster, political consultant, and political scientist on the faculty of Ouachita Baptist University in Arkadelphia, Arkansas. He died of a massive heart attack while awaiting to appear on Little Rock ABC television station KATV on the night of the 1978 general election.

Ranchino was a strong supporter of his fellow Democrat, future U.S. President Bill Clinton, who that night easily defeated the Republican Lynn Lowe to win the first of five non-consecutive terms as governor of Arkansas.

== Background ==
Ranchino was the fourth of five children born in Herrin, Illinois to Angelo "Comp" Ranchino and Esther (Verna) Ranchino. His siblings were three sisters, Alma Joy Hise of Kansas City, Missouri, Mariann Hunt of Des Moines, Iowa, and Cheryl Ranchino Trench, a newspaper columnist in Herrin, and one brother, John Edward Ranchino, who died in infancy. Ranchino and his wife, Veda, had two children, Tony A. Ranchino (b. 1969), a photojournalist for KATV in Little Rock, where his father collapsed, and Nicole "Niki" R. Jackson (b. 1971), who was seven at the time of her father's death and operates a children's camp. After her husband's early death, Veda continued to live in Clark County and the next year married local prosecuting attorney Henry Morgan.

Ranchino graduated from Herrin High School in 1954. He received a Bachelor of Arts from Louisiana College in 1961. In 1963 or 1964, he received his Master of Arts in history from Texas Christian University in Fort Worth, Texas; his thesis is entitled "The Work and Thought of a Jeffersonian in the Populist Movement: James Harvey 'Cyclone' Davis" and is a study of the Populist organizer and Democratic U.S. Representative James "Cyclone" Davis of Texas. He studied graduate political science, and also history under the historian William Appleman Williams, during his time at the University of Wisconsin - Madison, where he was from 1963 to 1965. Ranchino was described as a "campus radical".

== Academic and political career ==
At Ouachita Baptist University, where he started in 1965, his teaching colleagues included two other Arkansas political figures, Bob C. Riley, the lieutenant governor from 1971 to 1975, and the Clinton friend and Whitewater associate James B. McDougal, who subsequently ran unsuccessfully for the United States House of Representatives in 1982 against the late Republican John Paul Hammerschmidt in Arkansas's 3rd congressional district. Coincidentally, Clinton himself had lost the 1974 congressional race to Hammerschmidt. A Ranchino student recalls that the professor demanded original thinking by his students and sometimes gave false information in a lecture to test the alertness and preparation of the class. Ranchino was the director of the OBU Volunteers in Service to America program, the first of its kind established in 1968 in Arkansas. Forty-eight students signed up initially as volunteers. In 1969, the program was co-sponsored by OBU and the Arkansas Council on Human Relations and described at the time as the largest of its kind in the nation.

L. T. Simes, II, an African American student at OBU who in 1970 was elected vice president of the student body, recalls Ranchino as a:

visionary. I will never forget the conversation we had about political polling. He could foresee the art of polling as early as 1970. He allowed me to challenge him on this point. I didn't believe that it was possible to predict voter behavior in that there were so many variables. Dr. Ranchino was right. Now polling is a basic component of our electoral process. Most memorable was the time he invited me to come to his office the following day to meet ... this man dressed like a hippie, long hair, etc. Dr. Ranchino said to me, L. T., I want to introduce you to Bill Clinton. He became governor of Arkansas and later President of the United States. Times passes on ... While in law school I again met Bill Clinton as my law professor. ...

In the 1968 general election, Arkansas was declared "schizophrenic" by political observers for having cast its electoral votes for George Wallace, its gubernatorial majority for Moderate Republican Winthrop Rockefeller, and its U.S. Senate ballots for J. William Fulbright. As a result, Ranchino in 1972 published the book From Faubus to Bumpers: Arkansas Votes, 1960-1970, a political analysis of state election during the preceding decade. In the study he concludes that Arkansas voters are flexible and independent and can make consistent ballot choices even if they appear inconsistent.

Ranchino estimated the 1970 Arkansas electorate as 150,000 conservatives, 150,000 liberals, and 300,000 moderates. In his own words, Ranchino offers this analysis from 1970 which has been rendered obsolete by the development of political events in the 21st century:

Republicans have never had a party in Arkansas in the strictest sense. They have not offered consistent opposition to the Democrats at all levels of government and have frequently opted out for individual efforts and campaigns at the expense of the broad party-oriented effort.

...Whichever way the moderate vote leans in any specific election does make the essential difference between victory or defeat for the candidates. ... There is "no emerging Republican majority" (a term coined in 1969 by Kevin P. Phillips) in Arkansas built on a coalition of blue-collar, middle-class Democrats and upper-class traditional Republicans. The success that Republicans have had in Arkansas has come from a moderate liberal coalition based on blacks and progressive Democrats. That combination was shattered in 1970. ...

In 1976, Ranchino attributed the Democratic presidential nomination of former Governor Jimmy Carter of Georgia to Carter's young pollster, Patrick Caddell, who advised the candidate to accent the "trust factor," rather than highlighting various temporary campaign issues. Ranchino called his fellow pollster Caddell "the best in the country."

In September 1977, the cover of the Arkansas Times magazine carried an article by Ranchino, "The Arkansas of the '70s: The Good Ole Boy Ain't Whut He Used to Be", which reflects on the increasing use of marijuana, pre-marital sexual relations, and unfaithfulness to marriage vows "becoming more the rule than the exception". The article was published at the height of Anita Bryant's "Save the Children" campaign against homosexual rights in Miami, Florida. Ranchino wrote that many in Arkansas had by the late 1970s already been viewing the decline of family values with growing anxiety.

== Death and aftermath ==
Ranchino had no inclination of his sudden death. He had done election commentary for KATV since 1972. He leased a private plane to take him out of state as soon as his assignment for KATV had been completed. Ranchino had worked as a pollster on a campaign and wanted to be there for the final counting of the votes. Claudia Riley, widow of Lieutenant Governor Bob Riley, whose home in Arkadelphia had been a meeting place for many of the state's rising Democratic politicians, called Ranchino prior to his death "a bright star on the horizon."

Ranchino's funeral services were held at the First Baptist Church of Arkadelphia. He is interred at Rest Haven Memorial Gardens in Arkadelphia.

Veda Ranchino Morgan still operates Ranchino Research, Inc. She was a donor to Hillary Clinton in the latter's 2008 campaign for the Democratic presidential nomination against Barack Obama.

Ouachita Baptist University has among scores of scholarships; one named in Ranchino's honor.
