= Harmon P. Burroughs =

American politician

Harmon Peleg Burroughs (May 19, 1846 – January 31, 1907) was an American farmer and politician.

Burroughs was born near Rochester, New York and went to the local public schools. He served in the 8th New York Cavalry Regiment during the American Civil War and was wounded while in battle. He was commissioned a major. After the war, he moved to Virginia and then settled in Elkville, Illinois. He was a farmer. Burroughs served in the Illinois House of Representatives in 1895 and 1896 and was a Democrat. He died at his farm after being kicked in the head by a colt in the barn.

== Notes ==
There is absolutely no connection of Burroughs and Harmon name.
