= Little Illini Conference =

- Conference: IHSA
- Founded: 1970
- No. of teams: 8 Class 1A-4A
- Region: East Central Illinois (Clark, Crawford, Edgar, Jasper Lawrence, Richland, Wabash counties)

The Little Illini Conference is a high school athletic conference in East Central Illinois, United States that is a member of the Illinois High School Association. A group of small schools near the Indiana border, Little Illini is known for its strong football squads, in particular Casey-Westfield, which has won one state football championship The conference has undergone significant rearrangement in the past decade with the addition of several larger schools from the Apollo Conference driving many smaller schools to other conferences.

== History ==
The conference origins are twofold, the first iteration dates back to 1970 where the charter members included Casey, Marshall, Martinsville, Oblong, Palestine and Toledo-Cumberland. In 1972, St. Elmo joined the league and it maintained as a seven team conference until 1981, when Palestine left. As for the remaining teams, they would play their last season of football in 1983, leaving for other conferences.

The conference would rise again in 1996 with some familiar names as well as some new teams. The second incarnation of the league included Albion-Edwards County, Casey-Westfield, Marshall, Martinsville, Oblong and Toledo-Cumberland. Palestine would return to the fold in 1997 with Bridgeport-Red Hill and Lawrenceville joining in 2001. Flora would join the conference in 2003, however, by 2008 Martinsville would leave the league.

The conference has been strong in volleyball with Cumberland reaching the Class 1A final four three straight times from 2008 to 2010. Edwards County took third place in Class 1A in 2007.

In 2014 several schools, including Cumberland, Palestine-Hutsonville and Oblong left the Little Illini Conference to join the Little Okaw Valley Conference in central Illinois while Paris High School joined the conference. This followed the addition of Newton, Olney and Robinson high schools, which had been longtime members of the Apollo Conference.

Edwards County left the LIC for the Black Diamond Conference in 2016. They became an affiliate member in the BDC for baseball and softball from 2014/2015-2015/2016.

In 2020 Mount Carmel High School announced they would join the conference starting the 2021–22 school year, following the institution of a new playoff system in Illinois and the subsequent collapse of Indiana's Big Eight Conference. While Flora announced they would be departing to the Black Diamond Conference and Red Hill would depart as well.

== Member Schools ==
Little Illini Conference Members (clickable map)

School	Location (Population)	Team name	Colors	Enrollment 2023–2024	IHSA Class 2/3/4	IHSA Class Football	County
Casey-Westfield High School	Casey, IL (2,769)	Warriors		231.5	C, 1A, 2A	1A	Clark
Lawrenceville High School	Lawrenceville, IL (4,348)	Indians		325	B, 1A, 2A	2A	Lawrence
Marshall High School	Marshall, IL (3,933)	Lions		350	B, 1A, 2A	2A	Clark
Mount Carmel High School	Mount Carmel, IL (7,284)	Golden Aces		491.5	B, 1A, 2A	3A	Wabash
Newton High School	Newton, IL (2,849)	Eagles		400	B, 1A, 2A	2A	Jasper
Paris Cooperative High School	Paris, IL (8,837)	Tigers		521.5	A, 1A, 2A	3A	Edgar
Richland County High School	Olney, IL (9,115)	Tigers		709.5	A, 2A, 3A	4A	Richland
Robinson High School	Robinson, IL (7,713)	Maroons		477.5	B, 1A, 2A	3A	Crawford

== Membership timeline ==
Full members Full members (non-football) Partial member (listed sports) Full members (8-man football) Full members (Football Coop) Other Conference

== See also ==
- List of Illinois High School Association member conferences
