= Mt. Vernon Township High School (Illinois) =

High school in Illinois, United States

Coordinates: 38.315505°N 88.899087°W

Mount Vernon High School

Location
- 11101 North Wells Bypass; Mount Vernon, (Jefferson County), Illinois 62864; United States

Information
- Type: Public high school
- Principal: Rowdy Fatheree
- Staff: 89.57 (FTE)
- Enrollment: 1,240 (2023-2024)
- Student to teacher ratio: 13.84
- Colors: Orange and black
- Athletics conference: South Seven
- Nickname: Rams

Mt. Vernon Township High School (MVTHS) is a public high school located in Mount Vernon, Illinois, United States. It serves grades 9-12 and is maintained and operated by the Mt. Vernon Township High School District No. 201 of Jefferson County, Illinois. Mt. Vernon Township High School occupies 82 acres (33 ha) with a main building and associated sports fields. The school has an enrollment of approximately 1,325 students. The school is fully accredited by the North Central Association of Colleges and Schools and the State of Illinois.

== History ==
In 1903 the board of Mt. Vernon township decided to establish a dedicated high school for the entire township, and a school board for the high school was created the following year. The school was the successor to the Mt. Vernon City High School, which had been in operation since 1884. The township school district originally had 36 square miles (93 km^{2}) of area.

In September 1904 the first building, what would later become B Building, started being built. Mt. Vernon Township High School opened in 1905, with completion in July of that year, an August 15 dedication, and a September 1 start of classes. At its opening the new school had James M. Dickson as the principal, an enrollment of ninety girls and seventy boys, and a faculty of six. At the end of that first year, the class of 1906 had thirteen graduates.

Building B initially had a cupola but it was removed by a 1911 storm. Silas Echols, who began working for the school in its opening, became the principal in 1915 upon Dickson's retirement. In 1916 enrollment increased to around 160-260. The graduating class that year numbered 36. Enrollment was reduced during the United States entry into World War I but increased in the 1920s, and there were 503 pupils in 1935.

Unlike the city's public grade schools, which were racially segregated until the mid-1950s, the school was integrated from the beginning.

As the school's enrollment grew, Buildings A, D, and E buildings were built in 1936 and 1937, with E built first, D built second, and A built last. They were established under the New Deal's Works Progress Administration. The square footage increased by over 100%

In 1947 the school had about 48 faculty and 1,300 students. Echols retired that year, replaced by Robert McConnell. In 1949 construction began on a vocational building paid with a $250,000 bond. In the late 1940s the entire school property was worth $900,000. McConnell resigned in June 1950, and he was replaced by Arthur Milward. By the 1950s the township school district had increased in size to 272 square miles (700 km^{2}).

Building F with vocational and music facilities, was added in the 1950s;

Eltis Henson became principal in 1961 due to Milward's retirement. There were 80 faculty members and 1,635 students in 1962. At some point in the 1960s Henson left, and Archie Woodrome replaced him. J. D. Shields became superintendent in 1967.

Building G was established in 1964, and Building H was established, for career and technical training. in 1978. The campus eventually came to encompass 32 acres (13 ha), with eleven buildings and several sports fields. Shields ended his term as superintendent in 1988.

J. D. Shields Memorial Stadium was established in 1933, with a dedication that year, as Vernois Field; it was renamed after Shields died.

=== Mt. Vernon Community College ===
On October 29, 1955, the voters of the district approved establishing a junior college to accompany the high school. Mt. Vernon Community College operated on the high school campus and several adjacent buildings until its expansion as Rend Lake College (a part of the Illinois Community College System) and its 1970 relocation to its present main campus in Ina, Illinois. During that period the full name of the institution was Mt. Vernon Township High School and Community College. As a result, tertiary matriculation rates increased from about 11% pre-1956 to about half of the student body after five years.

=== New campus ===
Voters approved a bond to build a new high school in April 2011 on a 4,340 to 2,915 basis. FGM Architects was the company that designed the campus.

In April 2012 the district announced it was obtaining 82 acres (33 ha) of land for a new campus, and on August 29, for $1.5 million, the district acquired the land. The final payment of the bond was scheduled for February 1, 2013. Circa 2013 the district was evaluating whether reducing the size of the proposed new building would ultimately save money, or whether it would reduce the amount of grants to the point where such a reduction would not help the district financially. Groundbreaking occurred in August 2014, for the new 82-acre (33 ha) campus located at Wells Bypass and Ambassador Road on the southwest edge of Mt. Vernon. Tim King, the financial advisor of the district, stated in 2013 that the district was not likely to raise taxes despite the new construction. The former campus permanently closed in June 2016. The current Mt. Vernon THS campus at 11101 Wells Bypass opened August 19, 2016, with a ribbon cutting by Illinois governor Bruce Rauner.

== Curriculum ==
The school's curriculum circa 1905 focused on academic, scientific, and some manual arts classes, with additional vocational and cultural courses being established in the 1940s.

== Activities ==
The school sponsors a wide variety of clubs, organizations, and activities for its students.

School clubs & organizations include:

- Dramatics
- Drill team
- Family, Career and Community Leaders of America
- Future Business Leaders of America
- Future Farmers of America
- Hi-Tri
- HOSA-Future Health Professionals
- Math team
- PBIS
- Skills USA
- Student Council
- Thespian Society
- Yearbook
- FFA
- Youth and Government

Sports teams competing in the Illinois High School Association (IHSA) include:

- Baseball (boys)
- Basketball (boys & girls)
- Bowling (boys & girls)
- Competitive Cheerleading (girls)
- Cross Country (boys & girls)
- Football (boys)
- Golf (boys & girls)
- Soccer (boys & girls)
- Softball (girls)
- Swimming (boys & girls)
- Tennis (boys & girls)
- Track & field (boys & girls)
- Volleyball (girls)
- Wrestling (boys & girls)

The boys basketball team won four IHSA single-division state championships in 1920, 1949–50, and 1954 and has been to the Sweet Sixteen 17 times .

In the 1950s Benton Consolidated High School was the principal athletic rival.

Other activities competing in the IHSA include:

- Chess team
- Music (band, orchestra, choruses, solos, and ensembles)
- RockinRams Spirit team
- Scholastic Bowl team
- Speech

The music program won ten IHSA Class AA Sweepstakes Championships in 1973-75, 1979–81, and 1984–87 and has been runner-up six times. Official records for numerous prior single-division Sweepstakes wins are no longer available from the IHSA. The school now competes in Class A.

The school newspaper is the Vernois News; it was established in 1920 as the Orange and Black.

== Distinguished alumni ==
Mt. Vernon Township High School's many distinguished graduates include:

- Wilford Hall 1922
- Albert Watson II 1927
- Rolla Anderson 1938
- Walton "Walt" Kirk, Jr. 1942
- Jeane Jordan Kirkpatrick 1944
- Kenny Troutt 1966
- Nate Hawthorne 1969
