= Paris Cooperative High School =

School in Illinois, U.S.

- 14040 E 1200th Road, Paris, Illinois

Information
- Type: Public High School
- Established: 1869
- Grades: 9-12
- Enrollment: 179 (2023-2024)
- Colors: Orange and Black
- Athletics: IHSA
- Athletics conference: Little Illini Conference
- Mascot: Tigers
- Rival: Charleston High School
- Paris Cooperative High School
- U.S. National Register of Historic Places
- Location within Illinois Location within the United States
- Coordinates: 39°36′32″N 87°41′42″W
- Built: 1909
- Architect: Arthur L. Pillsbury; Berger and Kelley
- Architectural style: Classical Revival
- NRHP reference No.: 100003647
- Added to NRHP: April 16, 2019

Paris Cooperative High School is located in Paris, Illinois. The school mascot is the Tiger and its colors are orange and black.

On July 1, 2009, the renamed Paris Cooperative High School (formerly Paris High School) became the first cooperative high school in the state of Illinois. Paris High School is accredited by the North Central Association Commission on Accreditation and School Improvement (NCA CASI), and accreditation division of AdvancED.

== Athletics ==
Teams

Paris has been competing in the Little Illini Conference since 2015 after leaving the Apollo Conference. Paris was one of the original creators of the Apollo conference in 1970 alongside the schools of Newton, Charleston, and Robinson. Prior to joining the Apollo Conference, Paris left the Eastern Illinois Conference. Since joining the Little Illini Conference, Paris has been quite successful, winning the conference championship multiple times in many different sports, most notably in football, a sport that Paris is not well known for. However, what Paris is well known for is its historic basketball program. Since the programs first season, the Tigers have amassed over 1817 wins with two state championships in 1943 and 1947, two runner-up finishes in 1939 and 1942, a third place finish in 1938, and a fourth place finish in 1911, as well as many regional championships and sectional championships.

Sports Offered

Paris competes in the Little Illini Conference in the following sports:

- Boys Basketball
- Girls Basketball
- Football
- Softball
- Baseball
- Volleyball
- Wrestling
- Boys Track
- Girls Track
- Cross Country
- Boys Golf
- Girls Golf
- Boys Tennis
- Girls Tennis

State Championships

The Paris Tigers have won 6 state championships

IHSA State Championships
Sport	Years
Boys Basketball (2)	1943, 1947
Boys Cross Country (4)	1946, 1947, 1948, 1949

State Championship Finalists

In addition to Paris' 6 state championships, the Tigers have been state finalists in several other activities sanctioned by the IHSA:

IHSA State Finalists
Sports	Year and Place
Boys Basketball	1911 (4th); 1938 (3rd); 1939 (2nd); 1942 (2nd)
Boys Cross Country	1950 (2nd)
Boys Track and Field	1902 (2nd)
Competitive Cheerleading	2008-09 (2nd); 2016-17 (3rd)
Drama	1946-47 (2nd)

== History ==
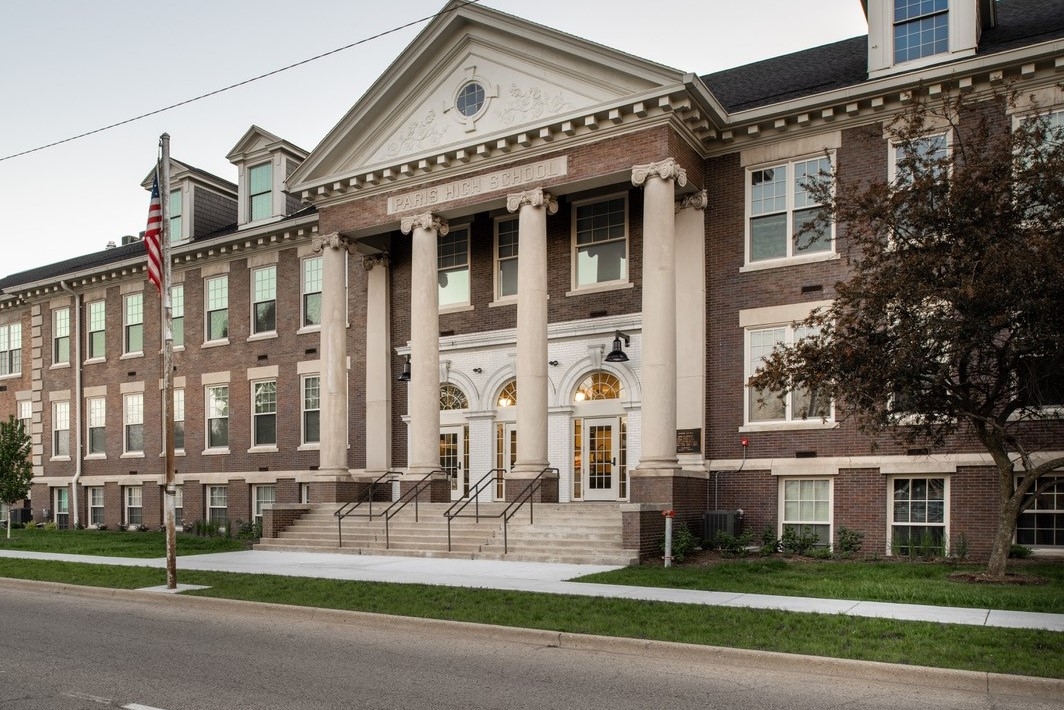
Original building

The first public high school in Paris opened in 1869. The high school shared a building with one of the city's grade schools until 1909, when the city built a dedicated high school building. Architect Arthur L. Pillsbury of Bloomington designed the building in the Classical Revival style; his design included a two-story portico at the main entrance, stone and terra cotta arched doorways, quoins at the corners, and a dentillated cornice. The school's sports teams saw statewide success in the late 1930s and early 1940s, and as a result, the city built a new gymnasium for the school which opened in 1944. Architects Berger and Kelley of Champaign designed the gymnasium in the Streamline Moderne style. In 1977, the gymnasium was dedicated to longtime boys basketball coach and Illinois Basketball Coaches Association Hall of Fame inductee, Ernie Eveland. Eveland led the Tigers to a state championship in both 1943 and 1947.

The high school celebrated its 100-year anniversary in 2009. On May 29, 2015, Paris Cooperative High School left its original building for a new location. The original building was listed on the National Register of Historic Places on April 16, 2019.

== Notable students ==
- John Honnold (1915-2011), law professor at the University of Pennsylvania Law School
- Brett Eldredge, country music recording artist
- Tom Sunkel, baseball pitcher for the St. Louis Cardinals, New York Giants, and Brooklyn Dodgers

== See also ==
- List of high schools in Illinois
