= Mount Zion High School (Illinois) =

Location
- 315 S. Henderson Street; Mount Zion, Illinois 62549; United States
- 39.768135°N 88.875816°W

Information
- Type: Public secondary school
- School district: Mt. Zion Community Unit School District #3
- Principal: Justin Johnson
- Teaching staff: 41.80 (on an FTE basis)
- Grades: 9-12
- Enrollment: 778 (2023-2024)
- Student to teacher ratio: 18.61
- Colors: Red and black
- Athletics conference: Apollo Conference
- Nickname: Braves
- Yearbook: Zionoiz
- Website: hs.mtzschools.org

Mount Zion High School is a public high school located in Mount Zion, Illinois. The school serves students in grades 9 through 12 and is the only high school operated by Mount Zion Community Unit School District #3.

== History ==
In 1912, the school's enrollment was about 100 students.

== Athletics ==
Mount Zion athletic teams are nicknamed the Braves and compete in the Apollo Conference. The Braves boys' cross country team won the Illinois Class 1A state championship in 2011.

== Performing arts ==
Mt. Zion fields three competitive show choirs, "Swingsations," "Les Femmes," and "You've Got Male." All three groups have won grand champions in their residing competitive divisions, respectively. "Swingsations" is the school's large advanced mixed group. "Les Femmes" is an all-female unisex group, and "You've Got Male" is an all-male unisex group. The school previously fielded "Premiere," a small, competitive prep group that has won numerous grand champion titles, and even competing in finals. Swingsations has won national-level competitions before. The program also hosts an annual competition, the Midwest Invitational.

== Notable alumni ==
- Howard Warren Buffett, professor and political advisor.
