= Southern Illinois River-to-River Conference =

High school athletic conference

- Conference: IHSA
- Founded: 1993
- No. of teams: 11
- Region: Southern Illinois

Locations
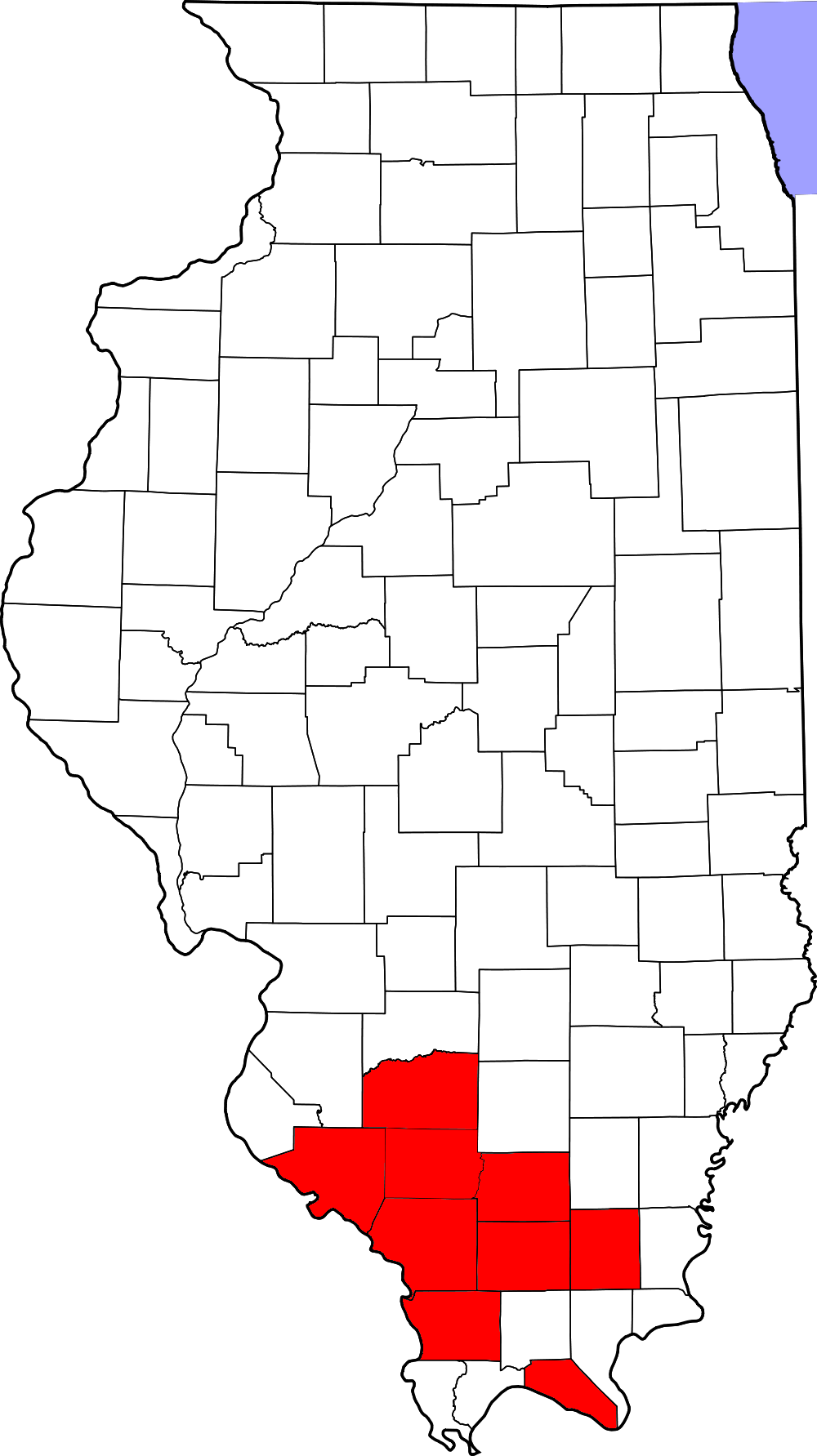

The Southern Illinois River-to-River Conference (SIRR) is a high school athletic conference, currently represented by 11 schools in southern Illinois. The conference is divided into two divisions. While technically in the same conference each division crowns its own champion, and each winner is regarded as the conference champion as if they were in two separate conferences. Schools are only required to play other schools within their own division although cross-divisional play is very common.

== History ==
Seven of the charter members of the River-to-River Conference were members of the old Southwest Egyptian Conference. Around 1991, the Southwest Egyptian was approached by Benton, Herrin, Harrisburg, and West Frankfort for membership; these four schools were concerned over their small size relative to the other members of the South Seven Conference (where all four were then located) and sought out a conference more in line with their size. Massac County (then an independent school) was approached about becoming a member, and in 1993 the Southern Illinois River-to-River Conference was formed.

At the start of the 2010–2011 school year Carterville left the Black Diamond Conference to join the Southern Illinois River-to-River Conference. Chester High School has taken their place in the Black Diamond Conference.

On June 12, 2020, it was announced that Sparta High School will depart for the Cahokia Conference the 2020–2021 school year, and the 11 remaining members were looking into potential replacements.

On March 13, 2025, it was announced that Salem High School of the Cahokia Conference would join the SIRR Conference, effective in the 2026-27 season.

== Current members of the Southern Illinois River-to-River Conference ==
=== Current members ===
School	Location	Nickname(s)	Colors	Years Member	IHSA Class (2016/17) 2, 3, 4	IHSA Class (2016/17) Football	Previous Conference
Mississippi Division
Anna-Jonesboro Community High School	Anna, Illinois	Wildcats; Lady Wildcats	Royal Blue; White	1993–Present	A, 1A, 2A	3A	Southwest Egyptian Conference
Benton Consolidated High School	Benton, Illinois	Rangers; Rangerettes	Maroon; White	1993–Present	A, 2A, 3A	4A	South Seven Conference
Du Quoin High School	Du Quoin, Illinois	Indians; Lady Indians	Red; Black	1993–Present	A, 1A, 2A	2A	Southwest Egyptian Conference
Frankfort Community High School	West Frankfort, Illinois	Redbirds; Lady Redbirds	Scarlet; Gray	1993–Present	A, 2A, 3A	4A	South Seven Conference
Nashville Community High School	Nashville, Illinois	Hornets; Hornettes	Royal Blue; White; Red	1993–Present	A, 1A, 2A	3A	Southwest Egyptian Conference
Pinckneyville Community High School	Pinckneyville, Illinois	Panthers; Lady Panthers	Columbia Blue; Navy Blue	1993–Present	A, 1A, 2A	3A	Southwest Egyptian Conference
Ohio Division
Carterville High School	Carterville, Illinois	Lions; Lady Lions	Navy Blue; Orange	2010–Present	A, 2A, 2A	4A	Black Diamond Conference
Harrisburg High School	Harrisburg, Illinois	Bulldogs; Lady Bulldogs	Purple; White	1993–Present	A, 2A, 3A	4A	South Seven Conference
Herrin High School	Herrin, Illinois	Tigers	Orange; Black	1993–Present	A, 2A, 3A	4A	South Seven Conference
Massac County High School	Metropolis, Illinois	Patriots; Lady Patriots	Red; White; Blue	1993–Present	A, 2A, 3A	4A	Independent
Murphysboro High School	Murphysboro, Illinois	Red Devils	Crimson; Corn	1993–Present	A, 2A, 3A	4A	Southwest Egyptian Conference
Salem Community High School	Salem, Illinois	Wildcats	Green; Red	2026-Present	A, 2A, 3A	4A	Cahokia Conference

=== Former Members ===
School	Location	Nickname(s)	Colors	Years Member	Current Conference
Chester High School	Chester, Illinois	Yellow Jackets; Lady Yellow Jackets	Orange; Black	1993-2010	Black Diamond Conference
Sparta High School	Sparta, Illinois	Bulldogs; Lady Bulldogs	Royal Blue; White	1993–2020	Cahokia Conference
