= Marshall High School (Illinois) =

High school in Illinois, United States

Coordinates: 39.3965°N 87.7000°W

Location
- 806 North Sixth Street; Marshall, Clark County, Illinois 62441; United States

Information
- Type: Public high school
- Principal: John Ritchey
- Teaching staff: 31.50 (FTE)
- Enrollment: 338 (2023–2024)
- Student to teacher ratio: 10.73
- Colors: Red and white
- Athletics conference: Little Illini
- Nickname: Lions

Marshall High School is a secondary school in the city of Marshall, Illinois. It is a member of, and the sole high school in, the Marshall Community Unit School District #C-2. The school is located at the north end of the city, near the Marshall North Elementary School.

The school hosts various extracurricular sports teams known as the Marshall Lions. The sports for which the school fields teams include American football, golf, volleyball, basketball, baseball, softball, and track and field. The teams take place in tournaments and invitationals hosted in and around Illinois.
