= Frankfort Community High School =

Coordinates: 37°53′54″N 88°55′15″W

- 601 East Main Street; West Frankfort, Illinois 62896; United States

Information
- Type: Public
- Motto: Education for Tomorrow's America
- Established: 1919
- School district: Frankfort Community Unit School District 168
- Superintendent: Matt Donkin
- Principal: Aaron Hill
- Staff: 38.51 (FTE)
- Grades: 9 to 12
- Enrollment: 414 (2023–2024)
- Student to teacher ratio: 10.75
- Campus: City
- Colors: Red & gray
- Athletics conference: Southern Illinois River-to-River Conference
- Sports: Baseball, softball, basketball, cheerleading, track, cross country, golf, wrestling, scholar bowl
- Team name: Redbirds
- Newspaper: Redbird Notes (RBN)
- Yearbook: Redbird Annual (RBA)
- Website: frankfortch.sharpschool.net

Frankfort Community High School (FCHS) is a public high school located in West Frankfort, Illinois serving grades 9 to 12. The campus consists of five buildings: FCHS Main School Building, Max Morris Gymnasium, FCHS Vocational Building, Johnson Field, and the FCHS Weight Training Facility. The school's annual enrollments include about 100 per grade. FCHS serves as the only local high school for the neighboring communities of Orient, Pershing, and Deering. Being an iconic symbol of the city for over 100 years, the school still serves the community as the only High School.

== History ==
In 1919, West Frankfort High School and Frankfort Heights High School were consolidated to form Frankfort Community High School. The West Frankfort High School had been located in the Central Building. The Assembly Room there also served as a classroom, study hall, and library. The curriculum was limited in that no commercial subjects, manual training, or domestic arts could be offered. The first graduating class in 1913 had only one member. The Class of 1914 had four students and produced the first yearbook. In September, 1920, the high school was moved from the Central School to the annex of the First Baptist Church for one year, while the present building was being constructed. The student body had grown to 236, of whom 16 were seniors, and football was organized for the first time. In the fall of 1921, 300 students moved into the current Frankfort Community High School. It was designed by the nationally known school architect, Mr. William B. Ittner of St. Louis, Missouri.

With a student body growing to more than 1,000 students, a three-floor addition was added to the original high school in 1938. It consisted of classrooms, shop rooms, a cafeteria, a study hall/library, and a music room. Early in 1949, the construction of a modern gymnasium with a seating capacity of 4,000 was begun. It was dedicated on February 21, 1950. The new gymnasium enabled FCHS to offer its students an expanded program in physical education. It was named Max Morris Gymnasium in 1985. In 1981, a new Vocational Building was constructed on the corner of North Lincoln and East St. Louis Streets. This facility has enabled FCHS to offer an expanded vocational curriculum.

The Verna Lee Burton Library was dedicated in the fall of 1994. With funds donated by FCHS graduate Robert Burton, FCHS was able to transform the former study hall area into an attractive, up-to-date library facility. The main building was air-conditioned and rewired during a 1999-2000 renovation project. In 2004–2005, Max Morris Gymnasium was renovated with new heat, plumbing, and wiring.

In the school years between 2013 and 2014, FCHS has seen 100 years of service for educating students in West Frankfort. Following this remarkable milestone, the community held a reunion for all the past graduates from the school to come and celebrate its 100 years.

== Athletics ==
The school's athletic teams (Redbirds) compete in the Southern Illinois River-to-River Conference. Offering a wide variety of options, these include:
Baseball
Basketball
Bass Fishing
Cross Country
Football
Golf
Scholar Bowl
Softball
Swimming
Track
Volleyball
Wrestling

The main rival of the Redbirds is the Benton Rangers located 7 miles north of the FCHS campus.

=== State championships ===
- Team
  - 2008-09 - Boys Bass Fishing

== Co-curricular activities ==
FCHS strives to offer its students a wide variety of athletic programs as well as many Co-Curricular Activities. These include: Art Circle, Beta Club, Business Club, Creative Writers, French Club, FFA, Home Economics Club, Key Club, National Honor Society, Outdoors Club, Olympiad, Science Club, Spanish Club, Student Council, Sub Debs, Thespians, WYSE, Youth & Government

== Alma Mater ==
Hail to thee dear Alma Mater
Hail to thee FCHS
We shall always love you dear old school
For we know that you're the best
Hail the teams that bring us glory
Hail the power friendships tie
We shall always strive to honor you
All hail to Frankfort High
