= West Richland Community Unit School District 2 =

School district in Illinois, United States

Location
- Noble Illinois; United States

District information
- Closed: 2015

West Richland Community Unit School District 2 was a unified school district based in the southern Illinois village of Noble in the western region of Richland County. On July 1, 2015, West Richland CUSD 2 was annexed into East Richland Community Unit School District 1, which then changed its name to Richland County Community Unit School District 1 on July 1, 2015.

The school district was composed of three schools: one elementary school, one junior high school, and one senior high school. West Richland Elementary School, the most populous of the district schools, served all students from kindergarten to grade seven; it also includes a prekindergarten program, which is considered separate from the school. Both were headed by principal Bernie Rusk. Graduates of West Richland Elementary School moved on to West Richland Junior High School, the least populous school in the district, to take eighth grade. The last branch of education to be had in this district was West Richland High School, which educated those in grades nine through twelve under the supervision of principal Kevin Westall. As of 2008, the district superintendent was Anthoy Galindo, and the district mascot was the wildcat.

Activities in the district included a varsity Scholar Bowl team, baseball, basketball, softball, and volleyball teams. In the high school in particular, clubs include a yearbook committee, a local FFA chapter led by Ethan Keyser, a student council, and various activities meant to enhance career success. Also science club is led by Martin Dunn.
