= Harrisburg High School (Illinois) =

Location
- 333 W College St. Harrisburg, Illinois 62946; United States
- 37°43′41″N 88°32′46″W

Information
- Funding type: Public
- Founded: 1902
- School district: 5
- Superintendent: Amy Dixon
- Principal: John Crabb
- Teaching staff: 42.68 (FTE)
- Grades: 9-12
- Enrollment: 528 (2023–2024)
- Student to teacher ratio: 12.37
- Colors: Purple; White
- Athletics conference: Southern Illinois River-to-River Conference
- Sports: Baseball, basketball, cross country, football, golf, tennis, track & field, softball, volleyball, wrestling
- Nickname: Bulldogs; Lady Bulldogs
- Yearbook: Keystone
- Website: www.harrisburg3.org/o/hhs

Harrisburg High School is a public high school in Harrisburg, Illinois, United States.

== Athletics ==
Harrisburg High School plays in the Southern Illinois River-to-River Conference.

=== State championships ===
- Boys' baseball
  - 1988-89 Class AA
  - 2003-04 Class A
- Boys' basketball 2012-13 Class 2A
- Boys' track and field
  - 1994-95 Class A
  - 1998-99 Class A
  - 2000-01 Class A
- Football 2000-01 Class 3A

== Notable alumni ==
- Danny Fife
- Virginia Gregg
- John Romonosky
