= Herrin High School =

Location
- 700 North 10th Street; Herrin, Illinois 62948; United States; 37.80983°N 89.02208°W

Information
- Type: Public high school
- Motto: Respect the Stripes!
- School district: Herrin Community Unit School District 4
- Superintendent: Nathaniel Wilson
- Principal: Jeffrey J. Johnson
- Staff: 47.85 (FTE)
- Grades: 9 to 12
- Enrollment: 667 (2023–2024)
- Student to teacher ratio: 13.94
- Campus: Mostly white
- Colors: Orange and black
- Athletics conference: Southern Illinois River-to-River Conference
- Sports: Baseball, basketball, bowling, cross country, football, soccer (co-op with neighboring high school), softball, track & field, volleyball, wrestling
- Mascot: Tiger
- Team name: Tigers, Lady Tigers, Tigerettes, Flying Tigers
- Newspaper: The Tiger Tattler
- Yearbook: Herrinite
- Website: www.herrinschools.org/o/hhs

Herrin High School (established 1903) is a secondary school located in Herrin, Illinois. The high school is led by principal Jeffrey J. Johnson. It has an enrollment of about 620 students. It is one of the only high schools in the U.S. that has its own bank, The First Tiger Trust.

== Athletics ==
The school's athletic teams are known as the Tigers and compete in the Southern Illinois River-to-River Conference. The athletic director is Stephanie Allen. Herrin High School Boys track team won IHSA Class A state track titles in 2007, 2008 and once again in 2010. The Basketball team has also enjoyed numerous successes over the years, winning the IHSA state title in 1957 over Collinsville by a score of 45 to 42, under Earl Lee. The basketball team also finished second twice losing 24 to 22 at the hands of Granite City in 1940 under Russ Emery, and 50 to 47 against Pleasant Plains in 2002 under Mike Mooneyham. The girls softball team has been very successful, finishing 2nd in state four times and winning conference several times under retired coach Bruce Jilek.

== Notable alumni ==
- Ray Chapman (1891–1920), second baseman for the Cleveland Indians
- Richard Clarida (born 1957), vice chairman of the Federal Reserve Board
- Steve Fisher (born 1945), coach of the Michigan Wolverines and San Diego State men's basketball teams
- Jim Ranchino (1936-1978), pollster, political consultant, and political scientist at Ouachita Baptist University
