= Carterville High School =

Location
- 1415 West Grand Avenue; Carterville, Illinois 62918; United States; 37°45′35″N 89°06′27″W

Information
- Type: Public
- Motto: Come Learn With Us
- School board
- School district: CUSD #5
- Superintendent: Sarah Barnstable
- Principal: Todd Rogers
- Teaching staff: 37.31 (FTE)
- Grades: 9-12
- Student to teacher ratio: 17.34
- Hours in school day: 6hrs. 55min.
- Colors: Orange and Navy
- Song: CHS School Song
- Athletics conference: Southern Illinois River-to-River Conference
- Mascot: Lion
- Newspaper: The Sphinx
- Yearbook: Lionite

Carterville High School is a public high school in Carterville, Illinois, United States. It serves students in grades 9 through 12 and is part of the Carterville Community Unit School District #5, which also includes Carterville Intermediate School and Carterville Junior High School. The school offers a variety of academic and extracurricular programs, including Advanced Placement (AP) courses, athletics, and fine arts, to support student development and prepare them for post-secondary opportunities.

== History ==
It has an enrollment of approximately 609 students. The school is a member of Illinois High School Association as a Class 2A member of the River to River Conference (Mississippi Division). Carterville's mascot is the Lion and the school colors are orange and navy blue. The high school moved into a new facility for the 2011–2012 school year.

== New High School ==
In August 2011, Carterville's students and teachers moved into the new high school building. The new 225,000 square foot school was built for $25 million. It features two gyms; a smaller multi-purpose gym with seating for 500 and big gym with seating capacity of 2,500. The new auditorium has seating for 750. Two stories of classrooms and laboratories complete the front academic wing. The Performing Arts wing, which includes the auditorium, houses new band and chorus rooms, as well as multiple practice and storage rooms. In the center of the building is the cafeteria.

== Academics ==
Carterville High School has been noted for its academic performance in Southern Illinois. As of 2024, it is ranked 95th among high schools in Illinois by U.S. News & World Report.

== Athletics ==
Carterville currently has 15 Varsity and J.V. sports including Baseball, Bowling (Coed), Boys' and Girls' Basketball, Boys' and Girls' Track and Field, Cheerleading, Cross Country, Football, Golf, Poms, Softball, Volleyball, and Wrestling. The boys' teams are called Lions, while the girls' teams are known as the Lady Lions. Although Carterville prides itself on its athletic teams, traditionally Carterville is a football town. Carterville has won 116 total Black Diamond Conference championships, including 19 in football, which is the most won by any school in the conference.

Carterville has been a long-time member of the Black Diamond Conference. Other Black Diamond schools include Johnston City, Christopher, Zeigler-Royalton, Sesser-Valier, Elverado, Hamilton County, Fairfield, Carmi-White County, Trico, Vienna, as well as a few other schools for particular sports. In 2010, Carterville moved to the River to River Conference's Mississippi Division featuring larger schools such as DuQuoin, Anna-Jonesboro, Pinckneyville, Nashville, and Sparta. This switch has been made due to Carterville's rapid increase in enrollment, along with their football domination within the B.D.C.

=== Football ===
Beginning in 1995, Carterville has reached the Illinois High School Association football playoffs in 22 out of the last 24 seasons. This span includes six quarterfinals appearances (2000, 2004, 2005, 2007, 2012, 2014), three 11 win seasons (04,07,14), only one losing season (18), and one state title in 1996. Over that span, two head coaches (Kerry Martin & Dennis Drust), accumulated over 200 wins. Martin coached from 1994 to 2001, while Drust coached from 2002 to 2018.

In August 2008, Carterville unveiled a new outdoor athletic complex. The addition includes a football field with an artificial playing surface that sports a large "C" at midfield with orange end-zones and also an all-weather 8-lane track, enabling the school to host track meets for the first time in many years. The fieldhouse is large enough that it holds locker-rooms for both home and visitor football teams, as well as a concession stand for visitors and team offices. The football field is an addition that includes baseball and softball fields.

It has been a long-time tradition during Carterville football games that "The Cannon" is shot off after every Lions' touchdown. "The Cannon" is an actual American Civil War cannon that is owned privately by a resident family of the town and is known as "Carterville Artillery Unit#1". The noise of the cannon is so loud that visiting fans are often taken aback by the boom, which can be heard throughout much of the town. "The Cannon" has become synonymous with the Carterville football tradition. Despite concerns of "The Cannon" being retired along with the old field, it has been taken out to the new complex and can still be heard following every Lions' score.

In 2026 long time assistant football coach John “Jake” Wakey was arrested and charged with nine counts of aggravated criminal sexual abuse involving male students between the ages of 13 and 17 years old. Wakey was terminated and his trial is pending as of September 2026.

=== Softball ===
In softball, Carterville is known as a regional powerhouse having won multiple conference titles in the past decade. In 2008 the Lady Lions posted only two losses and ultimately won the Class 2A title. In 2016, they finished the season with a 32–3 record and brought home the 2A State Championship title. In 2024, Carterville finished with a school-record 38–1 season and won a third IHSA Class 2A title with a 1–0 win over North Boone. The team finished No. 13 in the nation in the MaxPreps spring 2024 softball poll and No. 1 in Illinois.

=== Baseball ===
Baseball is also known for its winning tradition having been conference and regional champs several times, including consecutive sectional berths in 2007 and 2008. In 2013, the Lions reached the regional championship but were ultimately defeated by the Murphysboro Red Devils, ending their season. The Lions had big wins earlier in the season, defeating Anna-Jonesboro, and Murphysboro in extra innings.

== Music ==
Carterville's band program has had recent success on the field. The Marching Lions went competitive shortly after 2000. Comprising approximately 75-90 musicians, the Marching Lions entertain during football games at the halftime show. Since 2001, the band has gotten several first-place trophies at regional competitions and even received third place in the state in 2005. The Marching Lions have taken several trips to perform on the national stage including Washington D.C; Memphis, Tennessee; Chicago, Illinois; and Orlando, FL.
