= Pinckneyville Community High School =

Location
- 600 East Water Street; Pinckneyville, Perry County, Illinois 62274; United States
- 38.07864°N 89.37531°W

Information
- Type: Public
- Motto: Striving For Excellence
- School district: 101
- Superintendent: Andrew Dagner
- Principal: Haven Hicks
- Teaching staff: 29.35 (FTE)
- Grades: 9-12
- Student to teacher ratio: 13.73
- Colors: Columbia Blue and Navy blue
- Song: Pinckneyville Loyalty
- Athletics conference: Southern Illinois River-to-River Conference
- Mascot: Panther
- Team name: Panthers
- Rivals: Du Quoin Indians, Nashville Hornets
- Yearbook: Pyramid
- Athletic Director/Dean of Students: Matt Laur
- Website: School Website

Pinckneyville Community High School is a public high school in Pinckneyville, Illinois. It is located in Perry County Illinois.

== Academics ==
PCHS requires students to obtain a minimum of 32 credit hours in order to graduate. The core requirements include 4 credits in English, 3 credits in Math, 3 credits in Social Sciences, 3 credits in Science, 2 credits in Fine Arts, 2 credits in Physical Education, 1 credit in Vocational Education, and to satisfy the Consumer Education requirement

== Extracurricular activities ==
=== Athletics ===
The school participates in the Illinois High School Association (IHSA), and is a member of the Southern Illinois River-to-River Conference. Students compete in football, golf, cross-country, cheerleading, basketball, wrestling, baseball, track, volleyball, and softball.

Pinckneyville is known for its boys basketball program, winning over 2,000 games and appearing in the State Finals Tournament 11 times (winning in 1948, 1994 and 2001).

=== Clubs and activities ===
Clubs and activities that students of PCHS are given the option of joining include Art Club, Beta Club, Chorus, Concert Band, FFA, FCCLA, Green Team, Jazz Band, Marching Panthers, Music Makers of America, Panther Bakers, Pep Band, Poms, Pyramid Staff, Science Club, Scholar Bowl, Spanish Club, Student Council, and FBLA.

Some of the activities put on by the various clubs include the numerous concerts held by Chorus, Concert Band, and Jazz Band, FFA Week by the FFA Chapter, the annual musical by the Music Makers, Homecoming Week by the Student Council, and Snowcoming Week by FBLA.

== Demographics ==
PCHS has a population of 54% male students to 46% female students. Current ethnicity includes 98% white, 1% black, and 1% other.

== Sources ==
- Pinckneyville Community High School
- http://www.publicschoolreview.com/school_ov/school_id/26315
- http://www.localschooldirectory.com/public-school/27640/IL
- http://www.schoolmatters.com/schools.aspx/q/page=sp/sid=64863
