= Benton Consolidated High School =

American public high school

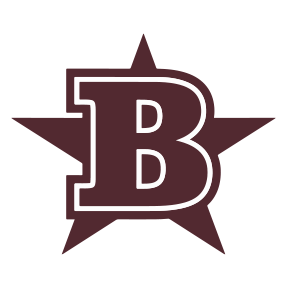

Location
- 511 East Main Street; Benton, Illinois 62812; United States
- Coordinates: 37°59′49″N 88°54′46″W

Information
- Type: Public
- School district: Benton Consolidated High School 103
- Superintendent: Benjamin Johnson
- Principal: Sean Docherty
- Teaching staff: 44.41 (FTE)
- Grades: 9 to 12
- Enrollment: 597 (2023–2024)
- Student to teacher ratio: 13.44
- Campus: Urban
- Colors: Maroon and white
- Song: Benton Loyalty
- Athletics conference: Southern Illinois River-to-River Conference
- Mascot: Ranger/Rangerette
- Team name: Rangers
- Yearbook: Scarab
- Website: Benton Consolidated High School

Benton Consolidated High School (BCHS) is a public high school located in Benton, Illinois, United States. The campus is located in a city setting on Benton's east side, and has been operating (though in separate buildings) since 1888.

Benton Consolidated High School is in a school district separate from the K-8 schools in and around Benton.

== Athletics ==
The school's athletic teams (Benton Rangers) compete in the Southern Illinois River-to-River Conference. The Rangers' main rival is the West Frankfort Redbirds, located seven miles south of the BCHS campus.

=== Sports ===
Benton High School offers the following sports:

- Baseball
- Basketball
- Cross country
- Football
- Golf
- Softball
- Track
- Volleyball
- Wrestling

=== State championships ===
==== Team ====
- 1979-80 - Girls' basketball, Class A
- 2004 - Competitive dance (pom division), Class 1A
- 2005-06 - Girls' track & field, Class A
- 2007-08 - Girls' track & field, Class A
- 2013 - Competitive dance (hip hop division), Class 1A
- 2014 - Competitive dance (hip hop division), Class 2A
- 2015 - Competitive dance (hip hop division), Class 2A
- 2020 - Competitive dance (hip hop division), Class A

==== Individual ====
- 2007-08 - Zach Wilson, IHSA wrestling, 140 pounds
- 2005-08 - Courtney Smith, IHSA Girls' Track & Field
- 2005-08 - Leah Orley, IHSA Girls' Track & Field
- 2020-21 - Gabe Craig, IWCOA wrestling, 285 pounds
- 2021-22 - Cy Norman, IHSA Boys' Golf
- 2022-23 - Gavin Genisio, IHSA Boys' Cross Country
- 2022-23 - Mason Tieffel, IHSA Boys' wrestling, 138 pounds

== Notable alumni ==
- Lin Bolen, television executive
- Doug Collins, basketball coach and player
- Billy Grammer, country music singer
- Richard O. Hart, Illinois state representative and lawyer
- John Malkovich, actor
- Rich Yunkus, basketball player

== History ==
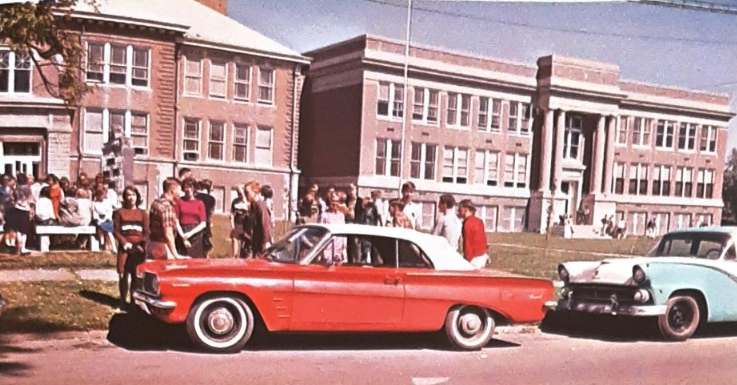
The building that was formerly Benton Consolidated High School. It was replaced by the new building in 1973.

The first class to complete their course of study for Benton High School received their diplomas in March 1888, with 12 graduates.

In 1909, the school became known as Benton Township High School, with 73 students enrolled at the time, and the building located across the street from its current location where a football field for the school's football team currently sits.

The school's name was changed to Benton Consolidated High School in 1949. The school district began to teach students from Benton, Ewing, Browning and Barren Township.

In 1973, the current high school building was completed.
