= Elkville, Illinois =

- Village
- Location of Elkville in Jackson County, Illinois
- Coordinates: 37°54′36″N 89°14′12″W
- Country: United States
- State: Illinois
- County: Jackson
- Township: Elk

Area
  - Total: 0.77 sq mi (2.00 km^{2})
  - Land: 0.77 sq mi (1.99 km^{2})
  - Water: 0.0039 sq mi (0.01 km^{2})
- Elevation: 404 ft (123 m)

Population (2020)
  - Total: 838
  - Density: 1,092.2/sq mi (421.71/km^{2})
- Time zone: UTC-6 (CST)
  - Summer (DST): UTC-5 (CDT)
- ZIP code: 62932
- Area code: 618
- FIPS code: 17-23373
- GNIS ID: 2398807

Elkville is a village in Jackson County, Illinois, United States. The population was 838 at the 2020 census.

== History ==
The village was named for the elk which frequented mineral licks near the original town site. Harmon P. Burroughs (1846–1907), farmer and Illinois state representative, lived in Elkville.

== Geography ==
Elkville is located in northeastern Jackson County. U.S. Route 51 runs through the center of the village, leading north 7 miles (11 km) to Du Quoin and south the same distance to De Soto. Carbondale is 13 miles (21 km) south of Elkville via US-51.

According to the 2021 census gazetteer files, Elkville has a total area of 0.77 square miles (1.99 km^{2}), of which 0.77 square miles (1.99 km^{2}) (or 99.35%) is land and 0.01 square miles (0.03 km^{2}) (or 0.65%) is water.

== Demographics ==
Historical population
| Census | Pop. | Note | %± |
|---|---|---|---|
| 1890 | 145 | | — |
| 1900 | 465 | | 220.7% |
| 1910 | 732 | | 57.4% |
| 1920 | 990 | | 35.2% |
| 1930 | 1,133 | | 14.4% |
| 1940 | 951 | | −16.1% |
| 1950 | 934 | | −1.8% |
| 1960 | 743 | | −20.4% |
| 1970 | 850 | | 14.4% |
| 1980 | 973 | | 14.5% |
| 1990 | 958 | | −1.5% |
| 2000 | 1,001 | | 4.5% |
| 2010 | 928 | | −7.3% |
| 2020 | 838 | | −9.7% |
U.S. Decennial Census

Up until the 1920 census, the village of Dowell was included in the Elkville tally.

As of the 2020 census there were 838 people, 351 households, and 213 families residing in the village. The population density was 1,085.49 inhabitants per square mile (419.11/km^{2}). There were 404 housing units at an average density of 523.32 per square mile (202.05/km^{2}). The racial makeup of the village was 87.59% White, 3.22% African American, 0.24% Native American, 0.00% Asian, 0.00% Pacific Islander, 1.07% from other races, and 7.88% from two or more races. Hispanic or Latino of any race were 2.74% of the population.

There were 351 households, out of which 24.2% had children under the age of 18 living with them, 47.86% were married couples living together, 8.55% had a female householder with no husband present, and 39.32% were non-families. 34.76% of all households were made up of individuals, and 16.81% had someone living alone who was 65 years of age or older. The average household size was 2.96 and the average family size was 2.27.

The village's age distribution consisted of 24.0% under the age of 18, 6.0% from 18 to 24, 16.6% from 25 to 44, 29.3% from 45 to 64, and 24.1% who were 65 years of age or older. The median age was 46.0 years. For every 100 females, there were 92.3 males. For every 100 females age 18 and over, there were 95.2 males.

The median income for a household in the village was $40,063, and the median income for a family was $41,875. Males had a median income of $35,139 versus $22,000 for females. The per capita income for the village was $22,013. About 17.8% of families and 19.5% of the population were below the poverty line, including 34.6% of those under age 18 and 6.3% of those age 65 or over.

== Education ==
It is in the Elverado Community Unit School District 196. It operates Elverado Primary School (Elkville), Elverado Intermediate School (Vergennes), Elverado Junior High School (Vergennes), and Elverado High School (Elkville).
