= Richland County Community Unit School District 1 =

School district in Illinois, United States

District information
- Type: Public
- Motto: Committed to Providing the Future Leaders of the 21st Century
- Grades: K through 12
- Established: July 1, 2015
- Superintendent: Chris Simpson
- Budget: $17.05 million (FY2012)

Students and staff
- Students: 2,398 (2020)
- Teachers: 128 (2011)
- Staff: 152 (2011)

Other information
- Website: www.rccu1.net

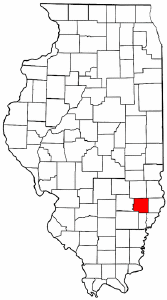
Location of Richland County in Illinois

Location of Illinois within the United States

Richland County Community Unit School District 1 is a unified K-12 public school district based in Olney, Illinois. On July 1, 2015, the district name was changed from East Richland Community Unit School District 1 after annexing the territory of West Richland Community Unit School District 2. The resulting school district includes Richland County as well as small parts of Clay, Jasper, Lawrence, and Wayne counties.

The district operates one elementary school, Richland County Elementary School; one middle school, Richland County Middle School; and one high school, Richland County High School.

== Richland County Elementary School ==
Richland County Elementary School, popularly known as RCES, is the single primary school in the district. As of 2011, the school encompasses 1102 students between these six grade levels, Kindergarten through 5th Grade.

Built in 2001, RCES incorporated the four former schools in Richland County (Central, Cherry, Claremont, and Silver) onto one property. It incorporates six classroom pods into two wings, with each wing serving either primary (Kindergarten through 2nd Grade) or intermediate (3rd through 5th Grade) students. Prior to 2010, each wing of the school were administered by a separate principal; now, Jennifer Fox is the main principal and Weston Pino and Margret Hahn are the secondary principals.

== Richland County Middle School ==
Richland County Middle School, popularly known as RCMS, is the middle school in the district. As of the 2024-2025 school yer, the school has 439 students between three grade levels, 6th through 8th grade. Jennifer Tedford serves as principal while Michelle Klinger as assistant principal.

Built in the 1970s as an open classroom school, RCMS was remodeled in 2010 to correct heating and air conditioning issues, replace interior walls that has been installed after the building's construction, and install state-of-the-art equipment and wiring. In 2011, RCMS was awarded a 1:1 Technology Grant through the State of Illinois. Through this initiative, the school purchased and deployed more than 500 Apple iPad 2 tablets to teachers and students for use in the classroom. As of 2019,the students have used Dell 3100 Chromebooks.

The school offers athletic programs in football, basketball, baseball, softball, volleyball, cheerleading, track, and cross country. The school mascot is the tiger cub.

== Richland County High School ==
Richland County High School, popularly known as RCHS, is the high school in the district. As of 2020, the school has 733 students between four grade levels, 9th through 12th. Jeff Thompson is the principal and Monica Grove is the assistant principal. It was fully remodeled in 2020 for $31.5 Million, adding a new auxiliary gym and replacing the aging Silvia Auditorium with the Richland County Performing Arts Center, also known as the RCPAC.

Students from RCMS as well as St. Joseph's School, and Full Armour Academy, also in Olney, transition to RCHS to attend secondary education.

Notable alumni include Brittany Johnson, a guard for the Ohio State University women's basketball team.
