= Capitol Conference =

High school athletic conference in Illinois, US

The Capitol Conference was a high school athletic conference in the Illinois High School Association (IHSA), based in Central Illinois. The conference operated from 1964 to 1983.

The original membership roster included Decatur Eisenhower, Decatur MacArthur, Jacksonville, Springfield Griffin, and Springfield Lanphier. Springfield Southeast was admitted in 1967, Champaign Centennial in 1968, and Normal Community in 1971. The conference remained at eight members for the remainder of its history.

The impetus for its demise came inadvertently and unknowingly from a member of the neighboring Big Twelve Conference. At the time, the Big Twelve Conference membership roster included Bloomington, Champaign Central, Danville, Stephen Decatur, Lincoln, Mattoon, Springfield, and Urbana. Initial discussions were instigated by representatives of Springfield High School to look into the potential feasibility of swapping schools within the two conferences where there was some common city "overlap" (this was present in Bloomington-Normal, Champaign-Urbana, Decatur, and Springfield). This would allow each conference to align even more tightly geographically, thus increasing rivalries and reducing costs.

Rather than proceed in that direction, the remaining members of the Big Twelve Conference alternatively decided to offer membership to all of the Capitol Conference non-Springfield "overlap" institutions (Champaign Centennial, Decatur Eisenhower, Decatur MacArthur, and Normal Community) plus Rantoul, while jettisoning Springfield. Those schools accepted, leaving the Capitol Conference with only Jacksonville, Springfield Griffin, Springfield Lanphier, and Springfield Southeast.

As a result, the conference folded. Jacksonville and Springfield Griffin remained independent, while Springfield Lanphier and Springfield Southeast (as well as Springfield) joined the Peoria-based Mid-State # Conference (where "#" fluctuated with the number of current members at any given time).

In 1993, the four former Capitol Conference outliers (Jacksonville, Springfield Griffin (now known as Springfield Sacred Heart-Griffin), Springfield Lanphier, and Springfield Southeast) came back together in the newly formed Central State Eight Conference. Its original roster also included original Big Twelve Conference castoff Springfield as well as (at that time) current Big Twelve Conference member Lincoln. Chatham Glenwood and Taylorville rounded out the initial eight.

Former Capitol Conference (and then current Big Twelve Conference) schools Decatur Eisenhower and Decatur MacArthur subsequently joined the Central State Eight Conference in 2014.

== Members ==
High Schools	Town	Team Name	Colors	Joined	Current Conference
Centennial High School	Champaign	Chargers		1968	Big Twelve
Eisenhower High School	Decatur	Panthers		1964	Central State Eight
Griffin High School	Springfield	Cyclones		1964	Central State Eight
Jacksonville High School	Jacksonville	Crimsons		1964	Central State Eight
Lanphier High School	Springfield	Lions		1964	Central State Eight
MacArthur High School	Decatur	Generals		1964	Central State Eight
Normal Community High School	Normal	Ironmen		1971	Big Twelve
Southeast High School	Springfield	Spartans		1967	Central State Eight
