= Carlock, Illinois =

- Village
- Location in McLean County, Illinois
- Coordinates: 40°35′09″N 89°07′32″W
- Country: United States
- State: Illinois
- County: McLean
- Township: White Oak
- Founded: 1866 as Oak Grove
- Renamed: 1889 as Carlock
- Founded by: John Franklin Carlock

Area
  - Total: 0.39 sq mi (1.02 km^{2})
  - Land: 0.39 sq mi (1.02 km^{2})
  - Water: 0 sq mi (0.00 km^{2})
- Elevation: 764 ft (233 m)

Population (2020)
  - Total: 548
  - Estimate (2024): 569
  - Density: 1,386.8/sq mi (535.43/km^{2})
- Time zone: UTC-6 (CST)
  - Summer (DST): UTC-5 (CDT)
- ZIP code: 61725
- Area code: 309
- FIPS code: 17-11215
- GNIS ID: 2397556
- Website: carlockil.gov

Carlock is a village in McLean County, Illinois, United States. The population was 548 at the 2020 census. It is part of the Bloomington–Normal Metropolitan Statistical Area.

== History ==
=== Oak Grove and Carlock ===
Carlock was laid out on January 5, 1888, by John Franklin Carlock. Mr. Carlock owned 160 acres (65 ha) of land. One 80-acre (32 ha) tract was used to plat the original village of Carlock. It was located south of the hard road, Route 9 (now U.S. Route 150), connecting Bloomington and Peoria. It was one of the last towns platted in McLean County. Just northeast of the present location of Carlock the main road from Bloomington to Peoria, which was locally known as the Old Trail passed or the Old Peoria Trail, ascended a low range of wooded hills. This location had long been of interest to townsite developers. The first attempt was made by local farmer John McGee, who in 1838 laid out the town of Livingston; it consisted of seven blocks and a town square. Livingston was a total failure. McGee was unable to sell a single lot. The second attempt at town founding was more successful. By the 1850s a small cluster of houses and stores had begun to cluster just west of McGee's townsite. In 1866 a post office was established with the name Oak Grove. On July 17, 1879, an official town plat was filed. Soon there were about twenty dwellings, a large town hall, two general stores, a blacksmith shop, a steam-driven mill, a harness and shoe shop, and a brass band. One reporter wrote that all the town needed "is a railroad".

=== The town moves down hill ===
By March 1887 it was clear that a railroad would pass nearby, and local people were denying rumors that their town would be picked up bodily and carried to the railroad. The people at Oak Grove sent a delegation to Bloomington to explain to the superintendent of the Lake Erie and Western Railroad the reasons for putting a station at Oak Grove; his reply was not encouraging. Then local farmer John Franklin Carlock, who also had a contract to supply the railroad with oak ties, laid out a new town about a mile and a half away. In November 1879 it was announced that the town movers had arrived in Oak Grove. Buildings were placed on skids and hauled down the hill to the site of Carlock. By February 1888 residents were moving into their newly re-located homes. In June 1888 the Oak Grove correspondent of The Pantagraph reported that "nothing is left of our town but pieces". Further west along the same new railroad, other towns were in motion: buildings from Farnisville moved to Congerville, and Chaffers Corners went to the new town of Deer Creek.

=== Original design and development of Carlock ===
The plan of the original town of Carlock was small and simple. It was a rectangle bisected diagonally into two equal parts by the railroad, with one whole block and two partial blocks on each side of the tracks. There were a total of 85 lots. Most of the businesses were along Perry Street north of the tracks. In 1895 there were about sixty buildings in Carlock; most of these were newly built, and only about twelve had been moved from Oak Grove. Because of the late date at which the town was developed, it did not enjoy the rapid growth of some that were established earlier. Carlock remained a rural service center, grain shipping point, and residential community.

=== New subdivisions ===
In 2004, the U.S. Department of Agriculture purchased a chunk of land to the northeast of Carlock, off Church Street. This land, which has been incorporated by the village, is being developed as a three-phase subdivision named Stoneman Gardens with approximately 65 lots of 0.5 acres (2,000 m^{2}) and a small park. The houses are built by the future, low-income owners of the homes with the assistance of an organization called YouthBuild McLean County and is financed by the USDA. This effort allows families which otherwise could not afford to move into a new home to do so. Ground was broken in 2005, and as of July 2010 development had begun on the third and easternmost phase which was to include the park and the final grouping of houses. While the subdivision currently has only one access point – Church Street – at least one additional access is planned in order to link directly to US-150 to the south.

Another subdivision named Rock Creek, on the eastern edge of Carlock and bordering US-150 to the north, contained two homes as of mid-2010. There were only three homes as of mid-2013, showing a slow developmental start but leaving many available lots for potential new homes in the next few years.

== Geography ==
Carlock is in northwestern McLean County along U.S. Route 150, which passes through the village as East Washington Road and North Bradbury Street. Interstate 74 passes just west of the village limits, with access from Exit 120 (West Washington Street). I-74 and US 150 both lead southeast 13 miles (21 km) to Bloomington, the McLean county seat. Peoria is 27 miles (43 km) to the northwest via I-74, while US 150, running parallel as a local highway, leads northwest 5 miles (8 km) to Congerville.

According to the U.S. Census Bureau, Carlock has a total area of 0.40 square miles (1.04 km^{2}), all land. Rock Creek runs along the eastern edge of the village, flowing northwest and then west to the Mackinaw River, a west-flowing tributary of the Illinois River.

Carlock and the surrounding areas receive police protection from the McLean County Sheriff's Police and the nearby Danvers Police Department for daily patrols, and Fire/EMS coverage from the Carlock Fire Protection District.

== Demographics ==
Historical population
Census	Pop.	Note	%±
1960	318		—
1970	373		17.3%
1980	410		9.9%
1990	418		2.0%
2000	456		9.1%
2010	552		21.1%
2020	548		−0.7%
Decennial US Census

As of the census of 2010, there were 552 people, 219 households, and 205 occupied housing units in the village.

The racial makeup of the village was 90.2% White, 7.6% African American, 0.5% Asian, 1.3% from other races, and 0.4% from two or more races. Hispanic or Latino of any race were 1.6% of the population.

The census of 2000 published 180 households, out of which 37.8% had children under the age of 18 living with them, 63.9% were married couples living together, 7.2% had a female householder with no husband present, and 26.1% were non-families. 22.2% of all households were made up of individuals, and 6.7% had someone living alone who was 65 years of age or older. The average household size was 2.53 and the average family size was 2.97.

In the village, the population was spread out, with 27.9% under the age of 18, 7.2% from 18 to 24, 35.3% from 25 to 44, 17.3% from 45 to 64, and 12.3% who were 65 years of age or older. The median age was 34 years. For every 100 females, there were 100.9 males. For every 100 females age 18 and over, there were 92.4 males.

The median income for a household in the village was $50,000, and the median income for a family was $50,417. Males had a median income of $35,469 versus $30,078 for females. The per capita income for the village was $20,227. About 5.9% of families and 5.3% of the population were below the poverty line, including 8.9% of those under age 18 and 1.6% of those age 65 or over.

== Education ==
Carlock has an elementary school that is part of McLean County Unit District No. 5. The school feeds into Parkside Jr High School and Normal Community West High School, in Normal, Illinois. The school mascot is an Eagle.

== Notable people ==
- H. C. Baldridge, 14th governor of Idaho from 1927 until 1931; born in Carlock
- Simon E. Lantz, Illinois farmer and politician; born in Carlock
- Bonnie Lou, recording artist, radio and TV star, member of Rockabilly Hall of Fame
