= Sarah Raymond Fitzwilliam =

Sarah Raymond Fitzwilliam was an American activist and reformer of public education.

== Early life ==
Sarah Raymond Fitzwilliam
- Born: October 11, 1842; Kendall County, Illinois
- Died: January 31, 1918 (aged 75); Chicago, Illinois
- Burial place: Evergreen Memorial Cemetery
- Education: Illinois State University
- Occupations: Educator, Principal, Superintendent, Activist
- Notable work: Manual of Instruction (1875)
- Spouse: Francis J. Fitzwilliam

Sarah Raymond Fitzwilliam was born on October 11, 1842, in Kendall County, Illinois, the thrd of five children and the only daughter of the family. She grew up approximately 1 mile (1.6 km) from a community of 800 indigenous folks. The conditions were not ideal for growing crops, so the family survived by hunting deer, turkeys, and wild hogs. Sarah's family consisted of highly educated lawyers, educators, and businessmen. Her father, Jonathon Raymond, helped build the first Congregational Church in northern Illinois outside of Chicago. The Raymond family and the Congregational Church were known for their abolitionist beliefs, and the Raymonds' home was even used as a stop for those individuals traversing the Underground Railroad. Sarah describes this experience in The History of Kendall County, and she outlines how exposure to slavery at a young age inspired her to pursue justice through education.

== Education ==
Sarah's early education took place in crude log cabins, but she eventually enrolled at the academy at Lisbon. Many educators at this time were moving out west to pursue independent careers, leaving the midwest scarce for teachers. In 1856, her father was elected sheriff, so the whole family moved to Oswego where Sarah attended and graduated from high school. She began teaching as early as age 16. Records show that she taught at Austin of Fox Township, Fourth Ward, Fowler Institute in Newark, and Hollenback throughout her life. At the age of 19, Sarah enrolled at Illinois State Normal University, now known as Illinois State University. By 1864, the rest of her family had moved to Bloomington in pursuit of a better education. During her time at ISNU, she taught at the Model School, where students learned and practiced how to teach. She was also assigned to the Wrightonia Society. This was a literary society for networking, and ISNU was one of the few schools to permit women into this group. At this time, most students graduated from ISNU in three years, but Sarah extended her studies to 4 years, graduating on June 27, 1866.

== Career ==
Shortly after receiving her degree, Sarah returned to Kendall County to teach English at the Fowler Institute. She did this for two years, and in 1868, she moved back to Bloomington to teach at the Bloomington public schools, now known as school district 87. She taught in Bloomington for a total of 24 years. Her first school had a reputation of poor student attendance and bad behavior, but after one year, Sarah was promoted to principal, and she is credited with fixing many of the school's systemic and social issues. When she was promoted, her salary increased from $40/mo to $65/mo.

In 1860, the first Black school was introduced in Bloomington. During this process, any Black students who tried to attend a white school were thrown out and harassed by the police. This Black school had very little funding at the start, and most Black students had to travel very far in order to receive an education. Knowing that the legal disputes and funding issues would not be resolved for a long time, Sarah took it upon herself to start admitting Black students into her school. In 1874, the Illinois Supreme Court outlawed racial segregation in schools.

In 1873, Sarah became the principal at Bloomington High School. One year after this, she was appointed as the superintendent of district 87 with a 3–2 vote. She was the first woman in the nation to hold this position, Though two members of the board were not present at the time of the vote, they both made their support for her publicly known. The two members who voted against Sarah were her close friends, but they believed the role should be filled by a man, not a woman. When she assumed the position, there were several financial and accounting errors, the curriculum was incoherent, and the staff consisted of 53 women and no men. The largest issue that the school faced, though, was building maintenance, particularly the price of heat. In 1875, Sarah secured the lowest prices for coal that Bloomington had seen in years.

The student population continued to grow, and at its peak, the student to teacher ratio was 55:1. In order to get funding to hire more teachers, Sarah administered a census. The school's funding was dependent on how many people under the age of 21 lived in Bloomington. The previous census had underrepresented this demographic, and in administering a corrective census, she secured additional funding for her school.

In 1875, Sarah was appointed as superintendent once again, at the same time that her friend Georgina Trotter was elected to the school board. Georgina served in that position for 15 years, and she was also the first woman to be appointed to the school board. As superintendent, Sarah drastically improved the efficiency and accessibility of her school. She revised and streamlined curriculum, particularly in the German and Latin departments. The drop out rate was very high at this time, so Sarah reduced the length of high school from 6 to 3 years in order to mitigate this issue. In 1873, there were 353 suspensions, but by 1892, there were only 13. Tardiness reduced by 70% by 1878. She also eliminated corporal punishment and emphasized the importance of parents supporting their children's education via articles published in The Pantagraph. 5 years after Sarah implemented these changes, Bloomington High School was added to the Industrial University's, now known as University of Illinois, accredited list of schools.

Sarah was deeply concerned about equality for women in education, for both faculty and students. She recognized education as an avenue towards independence from men, though she was criticized in a Chicago newspaper for "favoring women" in the workplace in 1892. She served as the first president of the Women's State Teachers Association, and she spoke about the importance of women's associations at their first meeting in 1888. That same year, she spoke on the importance of educating farm girls at the Farmer's Institute in El Paso.

Sarah published the Manual of Instruction in 1875. This book standardized the way that teachers and administrative personnel performed their jobs. It advocates for equality of race and gender in education, and it emphasizes that democracy depends on education. Her book was used by schools across the country.

In 1892, Sarah stepped down as superintendent. She was nominated for the position, but growing concerns about women in leadership roles deterred her from accepting. Despite the fact that Sarah's leadership was popular, there was a rapidly expanding pool of people who believed that there were too many women involved in education. In addition to this, there was an issue of diversity among the voter base. Of the 1241 women who voted in the board elections, only five were Black, leaving Black families largely unrepresented.

== Harry Bryant ==
On the morning of July 2, 1876, high school student Harry Bryant committed suicide. Shortly before this, he was demoted one grade level because he could not keep up with the high school curriculum. three different teachers worked with him, one of whom was fired, and 2 who did not pay attention to him. Harry was eventually readmitted to high school, but at that point, he was in competition with much younger students, so he refused to attend.

Harry's parents blamed Sarah and his teacher, Mrs. Anderson, for the tragedy. The Board of Education tried to host a meeting with Mrs. Byrant, but there were only three board members available to do so. Bryant did not go, and she instead turned her complaints over to the press. At a later board meeting, Sarah presented notes from Harry's doctor which stated that he had been mentally unwell for months prior to his suicide. She used this as evidence to clear herself and her school of blame for the incident.

== Personal Life & Legacy ==
After retiring, Sarah married Francis J. Fitzwilliam. The couple met in 1879, when Sarah was superintendent at Bloomington High School and Francis was superintendent of the First M. E. Church Sunday School. They married on June 23, 1896, and proceeded to travel up the east coast into Nova Scotia. They eventually made their way to Chicago, where they settled down for the rest of their marriage. Francis owned property in Chicago and Sarah owned 2 farms in Ford County. Francis died of a month long illness just five years after their wedding.

Throughout everything, Sarah and Georgina Trotter remained good friends. They opened the Withers Public Library together in 1887 after several years of securing funds and land. In March 1882, both women were elected officers of the Bloomington Library Association. They were also members of the Bloomington Benevolent Society, which was founded in 1884 to assist the impoverished community of Bloomington. In 1884, Sarah was unanimously elected president of the Woman's Home Missionary Society, which was formed in 1880 to aid southern, western, and Mormon women. The Sarah E. Raymond School of Early Education was opened in 1887 in her honor.

Sarah and Georgina lived together for their entire lives after Francis died. When Georgina's brother fell ill in New York, Sarah traveled there with her to pick him up. Sarah served as the executrix of Georgina's estate when she died. There exists very little correspondence between the two women, but the nature of their relationship is highly contested.

After Georgina's death, Sarah remained active in the community until her own death on January 31, 1918, at the age of 76. Her work included the Daughters of the American Revolution, the Illinois State Historical Society, the Chicago Women's Club, the Arche Club, and the Hyde Park Travel Club. She traveled the world with her friend Madeline Funk in 1912, and before she died, she donated many of her belongings. She donated her books and magazines to the library, and she left money to the McLean County Historical Society and Illinois Wesleyan, the school at which she was twice elected president of the Women's Educational Society. Sarah is buried in Evergreen Memorial Cemetery in Bloomington.
