= Central State Eight Conference =

Central Illinois high school athletic conference

- Conference: IHSA
- Founded: 1993
- No. of teams: 11 + 1 affiliate
- Region: Central Illinois

The Central State Eight Conference is a high school athletic conference in the Illinois High School Association (IHSA), based in Central Illinois. While the name implies that the conference has eight schools, there are actually 11 schools currently active, due to other schools changing conference affiliations. The conference was established in time for the 1993–1994 school calendar year.

Locations of Current Central State Eight Schools

== History ==
The impetus of the conference formation can be traced as far back as 1981–1982, originating from the remnants of the defunct Capitol Conference. At that time, the existing Big Twelve Conference membership of Bloomington, Champaign Central, Danville, Stephen Decatur, Lincoln, Mattoon, Springfield & Urbana voted to drop Springfield and add existing Capitol Conference members Champaign Centennial, Decatur Eisenhower, Decatur MacArthur & Normal Community, as well as Rantoul. As a result, the Capitol Conference dissolved, leaving its remaining members (Jacksonville, Springfield Lanphier, Springfield Sacred Heart-Griffin & Springfield Southeast), as well as Big Twelve Conference castoff Springfield, to find new homes.

Jacksonville joined the short-lived Greater Midwestern Conference (along with Chatham Glenwood, Hannibal (Missouri), Macomb & Quincy Notre Dame) for five years, then become an independent. Springfield, Springfield Lanphier & Springfield Southeast joined Pekin, Peoria Bergan, Peoria Central, Peoria Manual, Peoria Richwoods, Peoria Spalding & Peoria Woodruff in the Mid-State # Conference (where # indicated the number of active members at that given time). Springfield Sacred Heart-Griffin competed as an independent. With these five schools desiring to re-establish local rivalries and reduce travel expenses, the Central State Eight Conference came to fruition.

Original membership included Chatham Glenwood, Jacksonville, Lincoln (from the Big Twelve Conference), Springfield, Springfield Lanphier, Springfield Sacred Heart-Griffin, Springfield Southeast & Taylorville (from the Apollo Conference). Since its inception, Taylorville (following 2013-2014, returning to the Apollo Conference) has departed and Rochester (from the Sangamo Conference, starting 2010-2011), Decatur Eisenhower (from the Big Twelve Conference, starting 2014-2015) & Decatur MacArthur (from the Big Twelve Conference, starting 2014-2015) have entered. Lincoln has departed for the Apollo Conference following the 2016-2017 school year, with Normal University joining at that beginning of the 2017-2018 school year from the Corn Belt Conference. Lincoln High School is scheduled to rejoin the conference in the 2023-2024 school year. Quincy Notre Dame is expected to join the conference in 2024 for football only. The conference will then be split up into East and West divisions.

The conference is centered on high schools in the Springfield/Sangamon County (Illinois) area.

== Member Schools ==
Name	Location	Nickname(s)	Colors	School	Type	Enrollment (2024-2025)	Joined	Reference
Glenwood High School	Chatham	Titans		Public	Co-Educational	1,435	1993	
Eisenhower High School	Decatur	Panthers		Public	Co-Educational	860	2014	
MacArthur High School	Decatur	Generals		Public	Co-Educational	1,009	2014	
Jacksonville High School	Jacksonville	Crimsons		Public	Co-Educational	840	1993	
Lincoln High School	Lincoln	Railsplitters		Public	Co-Educational	751	1993-2017; 2023	
University High School	Normal	Pioneers		Public	Co-Educational	625 / 1031.25% (multiplied)	2017	
Rochester High School	Rochester	Rockets		Public	Co-Educational	682	2010	
Springfield High School	Springfield	Senators		Public	Co-Educational	1,267	1993	
Lanphier High School	Springfield	Lions		Public	Co-Educational	1,050	1993	
Sacred Heart-Griffin High School	Springfield	Cyclones		Non-Public	Co-Educational	550 / 907.5% (multiplied)	1993	
Southeast High School	Springfield	Spartans		Public	Co-Educational	1,160	1993	

- % - Multiplier

=== Associate member ===
Name	Location	Nickname(s)	Colors	School	Type	Enrollment (2022-2023)	Sport	Joined	Reference
Quincy Notre Dame High School	Quincy	Raiders		Non-Public	Co-Educational	388.5 / 641.03% (multiplied)	Football	2024*	

- % - Multiplier

== Former Member High Schools ==
Name	Town	Nickname(s)	Colors	School	Type	Enrollment (2015-2016)	IHSA Classification (2015-2016)	Joined	Departed	Reference
Taylorville High School	Taylorville	Tornadoes		Public	Co-Educational	809	A, AA, 2A, 3A	1993	2014	

== Membership timeline ==
Beginning in 1993, the Central State Eight Conference competes in 11 boys, 13 girls and 13 coed sports and activities within the IHSA.

Central State Eight Conference full members Assoc. members (football only)
