= John Ridgeway III =

American football player (born 1999)

John Ridgeway
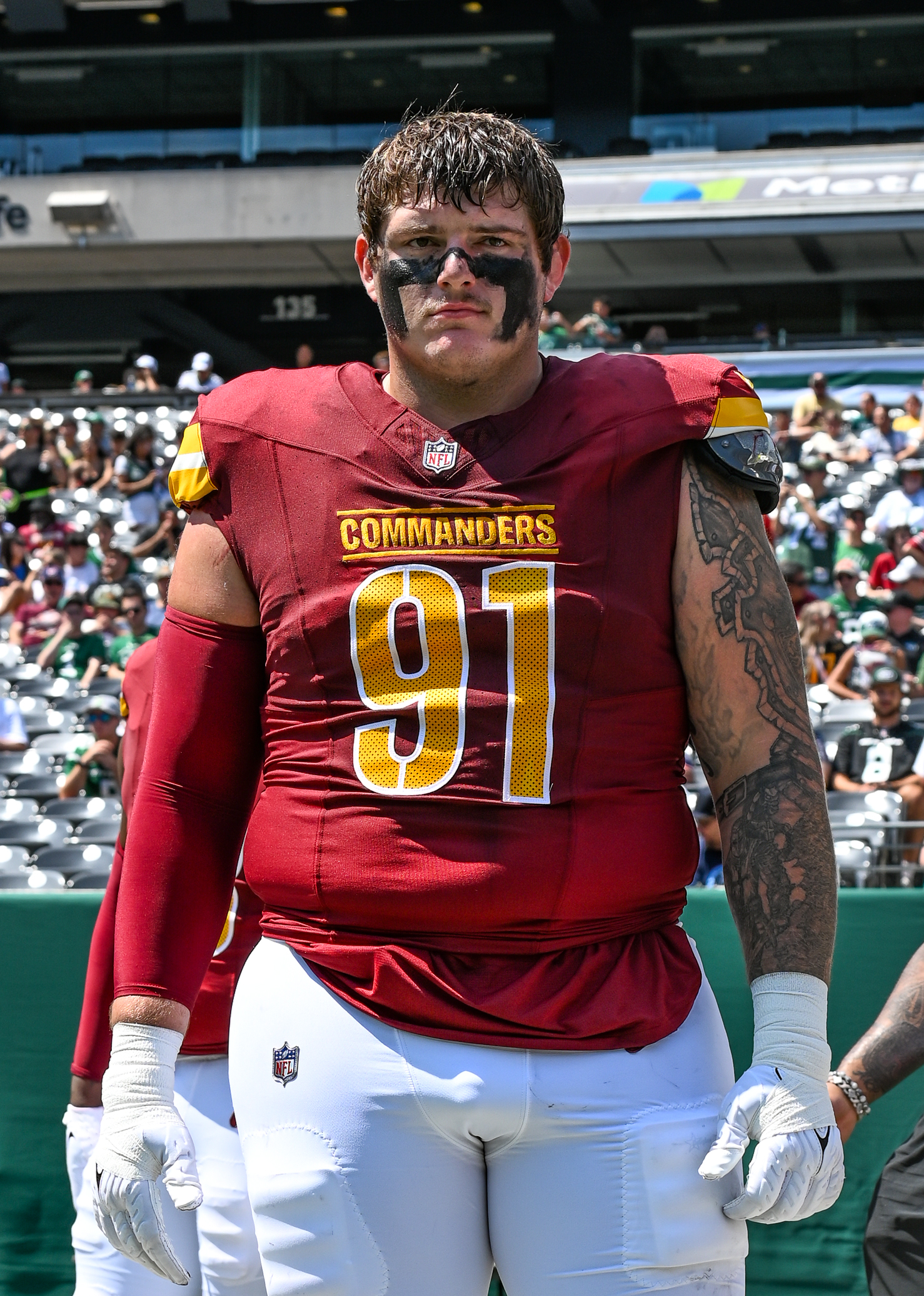
- Ridgeway with the Washington Commanders in 2024

No. 95 – New Orleans Saints
- Position: Defensive tackle
- Roster status: Active

Personal information
- Born: May 7, 1999 (age 27); Bloomington, Illinois, U.S.
- Listed height: 6 ft 5 in (1.96 m)
- Listed weight: 321 lb (146 kg)

Career information
- High school: Bloomington
- College: Illinois State (2017–2020); Arkansas (2021)
- NFL draft: 2022: 5th round, 178th overall pick

Career history
- Dallas Cowboys (2022); Washington Commanders (2022–2024); New Orleans Saints (2024–present)

Awards and highlights
- First-team All-MVFC (2020)

Career NFL statistics as of 2025
- Total tackles: 81
- Forced fumbles: 1
- Pass deflections: 3
- Stats at Pro Football Reference

John Ridgeway III (born May 7, 1999) is an American professional football defensive tackle for the New Orleans Saints of the National Football League (NFL). He played college football for the Illinois State Redbirds and Arkansas Razorbacks and was selected by the Dallas Cowboys in the fifth round of the 2022 NFL draft. Ridgeway has also played for the Washington Commanders.

== Early life ==
Ridgeway grew up in Bloomington, Illinois, and attended Bloomington High School. At Bloomington, he played offensive tackle and defensive tackle on the football team, competed in the shot put and discus on the track and field team, and was a four-year letter winner on the wrestling team. Ridgeway was named first-team All-Big Twelve Conference on offense and first-team All-State on defense as a senior. He also won the state heavyweight wrestling championship.

== College career ==
Ridgeway began his collegiate career at Illinois State, where he redshirted as a true freshman. During his redshirt season he focused on the defensive tackle position after initially being recruited to play on the offensive line. Ridgeway was named to the Missouri Valley Football Conference (MVFC) All-Newcomer team as a redshirt freshman after recording 30 tackles with one sack. He had 22 tackles with three tackles for loss and was named first-team All-MVFC in his redshirt junior season, which was shortened and played in the spring of 2021 due to the COVID-19 pandemic in the United States. After the season, he transferred to Arkansas.

Ridgeway was named the Razorback's starting nose guard going into the 2021 season, but missed the season opener due to an appendectomy. He finished the season with 39 tackles, two sacks and four tackles for loss, helping Arkansas finish 9–4 and ranked #21 in the AP Poll for the season after winning the 2022 Outback Bowl over Penn St. Ridgeway declared for the 2022 NFL draft after the end of the season.

== Professional career ==
Pre-draft measurables
Height	Weight	Arm length	Hand span	Wingspan	40-yard dash	10-yard split	20-yard split	20-yard shuttle	Three-cone drill	Vertical jump	Broad jump	Bench press
6 ft 5 1/8 in (1.96 m)	321 lb (146 kg)	33 3/8 in (0.85 m)	10 in (0.25 m)	6 ft 9 3/8 in (2.07 m)	5.30 s	1.81 s	3.04 s	4.69 s	7.90 s	28.0 in (0.71 m)	8 ft 5 in (2.57 m)	25 reps
All values from NFL Combine/Pro Day

=== Dallas Cowboys ===
Ridgeway was selected by the Dallas Cowboys in the fifth round (178th overall) of the 2022 NFL Draft. He was waived on September 17, 2022.

=== Washington Commanders ===
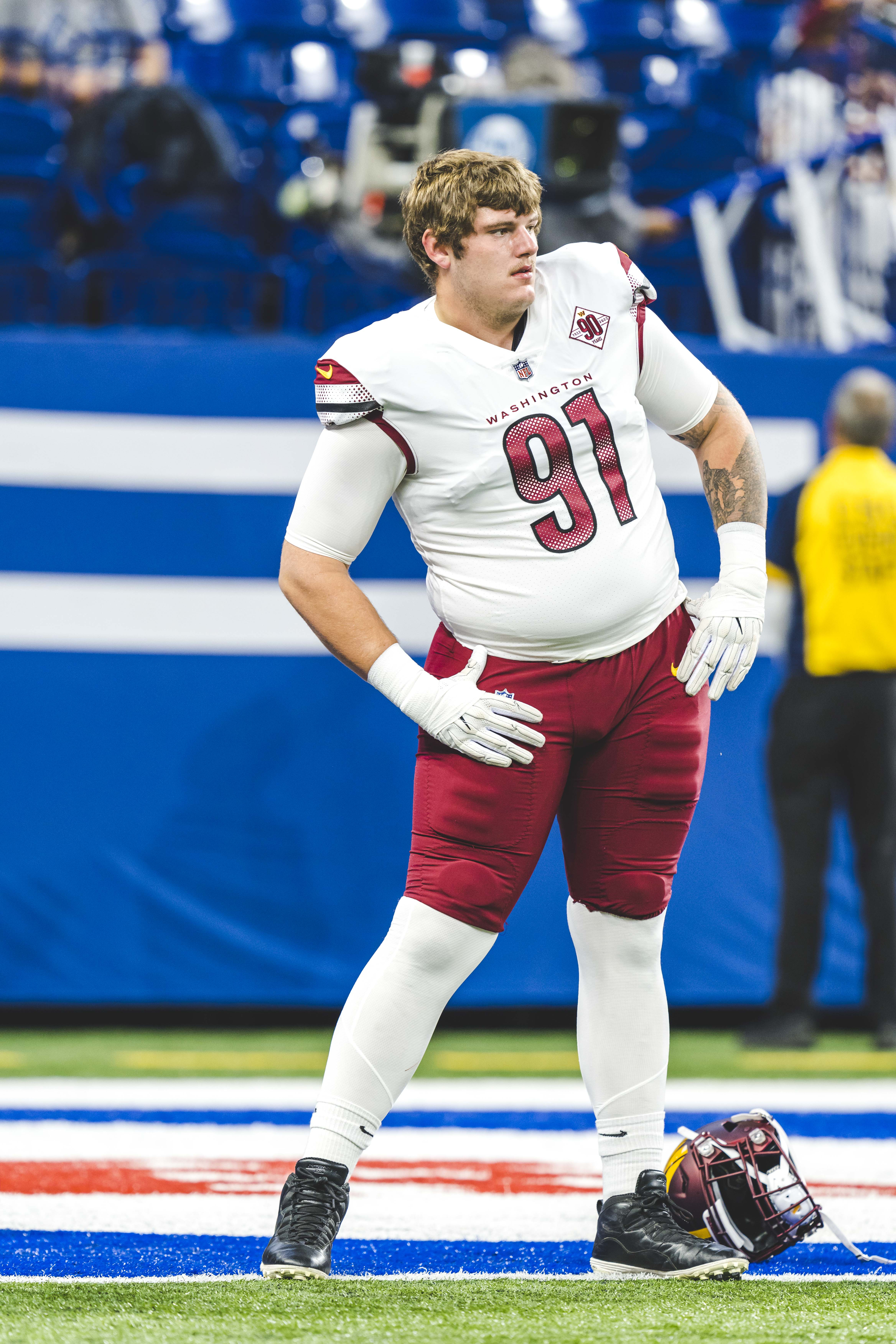
Ridgeway stretching before a game with the Washington Commanders, 2022

Ridgeway was claimed off waivers by the Washington Commanders on September 19, 2022. In the Week 9 loss to the Minnesota Vikings, Ridgeway made a critical mistake for illegal contact with Andrew DePaola on the Vikings' field goal attempt on fourth down with less than two minutes remaining in the game. The Commanders were flagged with an unnecessary roughness penalty giving the Vikings another first down, which allowed them to run out the clock before scoring a field goal and ending the game at a final score of 20–17. The following week, he forced a fumble out of tight end Dallas Goedert which was recovered by linebacker Jamin Davis ultimately helping to beat the then undefeated Philadelphia Eagles. He appeared in 15 games with four starts, registering 24 tackles, one forced fumble and one pass defensed.

In 2023, he appeared in all 17 games with two starts, posting a career-best 31 tackles (16 solo) and one pass defensed. He had a career-high 6 tackles (three solo) in Week 7 against the New York Giants.

=== New Orleans Saints ===
On August 28, 2024, the Commanders traded Ridgeway and a seventh round pick in the 2025 NFL draft (#248-Moliki Matavao) to the New Orleans Saints in exchange for a sixth round pick (which was later returned by the Commanders as part of the compensation in the trade for Marshon Lattimore).

In 2024, he appeared in 13 games, making 15 tackles (one for loss) and one pass defensed. He was declared inactive in four contests. He also contributed on the field goal and extra point block units, where he tallied a blocked kick against the Atlanta Falcons.

On March 11, 2026, Ridgeway signed a two-year, $6.2 million extension with the Saints.

== Career statistics ==
=== Regular season ===
Year	Team	Games		Tackles						Interceptions						Fumbles			
Year	Team	GP	GS	Cmb	Solo	Ast	Sck	TFL	QBHits	PD	Int	Yds	Avg	Lng	TD	FF	FR	Yds	TD
2022	WAS	15	4	24	9	15	0.0	0	0	1	0	0	0.0	0	0	1	0	0	0
2023	WAS	17	2	31	16	15	0.0	0	0	1	0	0	0.0	0	0	0	0	0	0
2024	NO	13	0	15	8	7	0.0	1	0	1	0	0	0.0	0	0	0	0	0	0
2025	NO	4	2	11	3	8	0.0	1	1	0	0	0	0.0	0	0	0	0	0	0
Career		49	8	81	36	45	0.0	2	1	3	0	0	0.0	0	0	1	0	0	0
