= Marcellus Johnson =

American football player (born 2000)

No. 79 – Dallas Cowboys
- Position: Offensive tackle
- Roster status: Practice squad

Personal information
- Born: April 1, 2000 (age 26); Normal, Illinois, U.S.
- Listed height: 6 ft 4 in (1.93 m)
- Listed weight: 307 lb (139 kg)

Career information
- High school: Normal Community (Normal, Illinois)
- College: Eastern Michigan (2018–2022); Missouri (2023)
- NFL draft: 2024: undrafted

Career history
- New York Giants (2024)*; Minnesota Vikings (2024)*; New York Giants (2024)*; Minnesota Vikings (2025)*; Indianapolis Colts (2025)*; Dallas Cowboys (2025–present)*
- * Offseason or practice squad member only
- Stats at Pro Football Reference

Marcellus Morris Johnson (born April 1, 2000) is an American professional football offensive tackle for the Dallas Cowboys of the National Football League (NFL). He played college football for the Eastern Michigan Eagles and Missouri Tigers. Johnson also played for the New York Giants.

== Early life ==
Johnson was born on April 1, 2000, and grew up in Normal, Illinois. He attended Normal Community High School where, as a senior, he was a unanimous Big 12 Conference selection. A two-star recruit, he committed to play college football for the Eastern Michigan Eagles.

== College career ==
Johnson played for the Eastern Michigan Eagles of Eastern Michigan University from 2018 to 2022 and the Missouri Tigers of the University of Missouri for 2023 as a graduate student. While at Eastern Michigan he was named to Academic All-MAC three times from 2019 to 2021. In 2023, Johnson was named to the Fall SEC Academic Honor Roll while playing for Missouri.

== Professional career ==
Pre-draft measurables
Height	Weight	Arm length	Hand span	Wingspan	40-yard dash	10-yard split	20-yard split	20-yard shuttle	Three-cone drill	Vertical jump	Broad jump	Bench press
6 ft 4 1/2 in (1.94 m)	313 lb (142 kg)	33 1/4 in (0.84 m)	10 in (0.25 m)	6 ft 11 1/4 in (2.11 m)	5.20 s	1.76 s	2.96 s	4.90 s	8.13 s	31.5 in (0.80 m)	8 ft 9 in (2.67 m)	30 reps
All values from Missouri's Pro Day

=== New York Giants (first stint) ===
After not being selected in the 2024 NFL draft, Johnson signed with the New York Giants as an undrafted free agent. He was waived on August 27, and re-signed to the practice squad. On September 10, Johnson was released from the practice squad.

=== Minnesota Vikings (first stint) ===
On September 17, Johnson signed with Minnesota Vikings practice squad. He was released on October 29.

=== New York Giants (second stint) ===
On October 30, Johnson signed with the Giants practice squad. He did not play in any games, despite being misreported by both the Fox broadcast and independent media as playing during the Thanksgiving Day game against the Dallas Cowboys.

=== Minnesota Vikings (second stint) ===
On January 13, 2025, Johnson was signed to the Minnesota Vikings' practice squad. He signed a reserve/future contract on January 16. On August 4, Johnson was waived by the Vikings.

=== Indianapolis Colts ===
On August 9, 2025, Johnson signed with the Indianapolis Colts. He was waived on August 26 as part of final roster cuts and re-signed to the practice squad the next day. On October 14, Johnson was released from the practice squad.

=== Dallas Cowboys ===
On November 12, 2025, Johnson signed with the Dallas Cowboys' practice squad. He signed a reserve/future contract with Dallas on January 6, 2026. On August 30, Johnson was waived by the Cowboys as a part of final roster cuts; he was re–signed to the team's practice squad the next day.
