= Andy Studebaker =

American football player (born 1985)

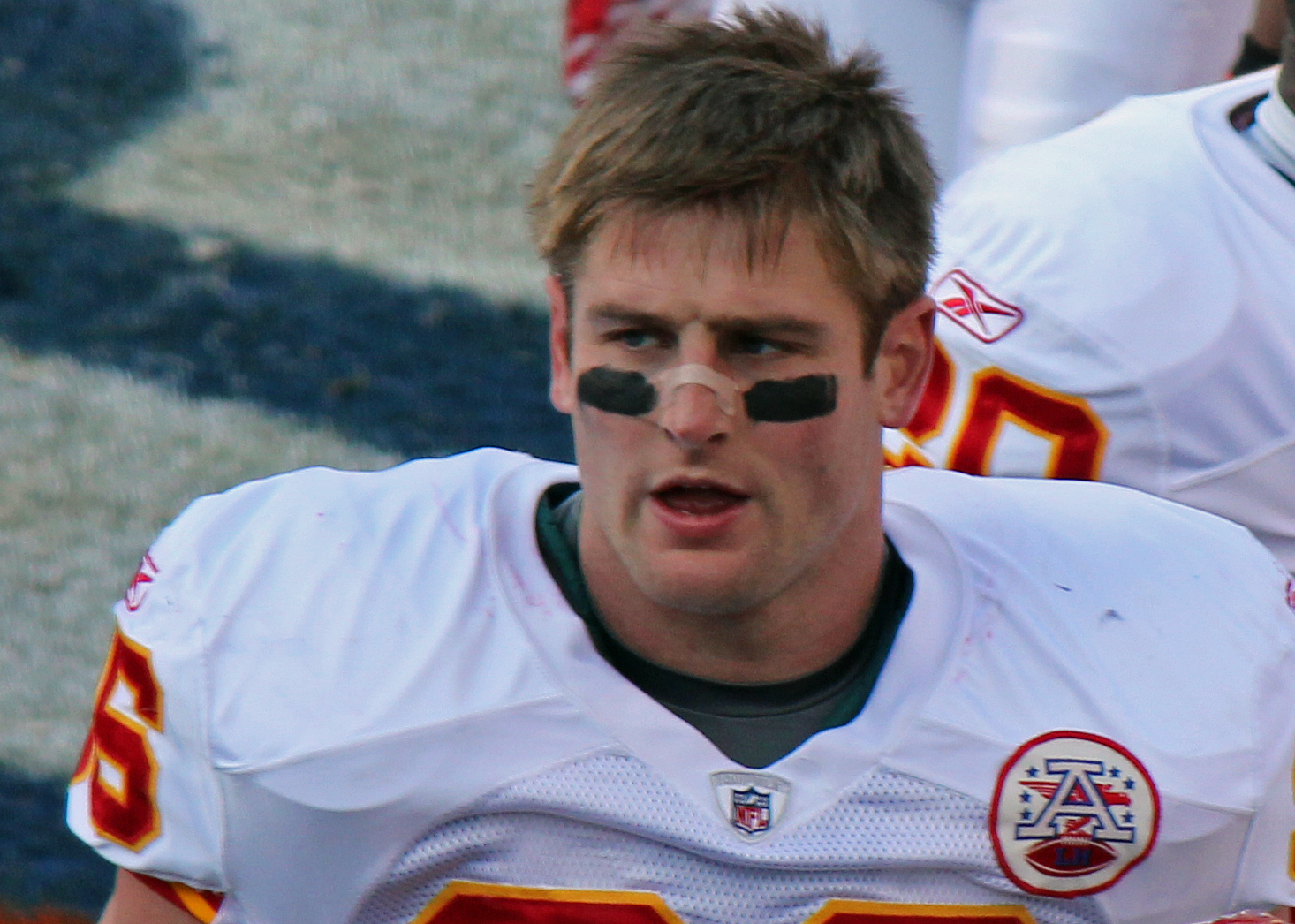
- Studebaker with the Kansas City Chiefs in 2011

No. 96, 58, 59
- Position: Linebacker

Personal information
- Born: September 16, 1985 (age 41); Congerville, Illinois, U.S.
- Listed height: 6 ft 3 in (1.91 m)
- Listed weight: 251 lb (114 kg)

Career information
- High school: Eureka (Eureka, Illinois)
- College: Wheaton
- NFL draft: 2008: 6th round, 203rd overall pick

Career history
- Philadelphia Eagles (2008)*; Kansas City Chiefs (2008–2012); Jacksonville Jaguars (2013)*; Indianapolis Colts (2013–2014); Tennessee Titans (2015)*; Indianapolis Colts (2015)
- * Offseason or practice squad member only

Awards and highlights
- 2× First-team All-CCIW (2005, 2006); CCIW Defensive P.O.Y. (2006); First-team Division III (NCAA); DIII All-American (2006)

Career NFL statistics
- Total tackles: 111
- Sacks: 2.5
- Forced fumbles: 3
- Fumble recoveries: 3
- Interceptions: 2
- Defensive touchdowns: 1
- Stats at Pro Football Reference

Andrew Michael Studebaker (born September 16, 1985) is an American former professional football player who was a linebacker in the National Football League (NFL). He played college football for the Wheaton Thunder, and was selected by the Philadelphia Eagles in the sixth round of the 2008 NFL draft. He is a descendant of the Studebaker brothers, creators of the now-defunct automobile by the same name.

== Early life ==
Born September 16, 1985, Studebaker grew up in Congerville, Illinois. While in high school, he played football, basketball and track. He was the First-team All-Conference tight end and a unanimous pick at defensive end in 2003 and Team Captain of the football team his senior year.

== College career ==
Following his junior year at Wheaton College in 2006, Studebaker was named a First-team All-American and North Region Defensive Player of the year by D3Football.com. He was also named College Conference of Illinois and Wisconsin Defensive Player of the Year. He led the conference with 17½ sacks (the most in the NCAA in 2006) and 25½ tackles for loss. Studebaker graduated from Wheaton College in May 2008 with a degree in Applied Health Sciences.

== Professional career ==
Studebaker was the first player from Wheaton College to be drafted into the National Football League.

=== Philadelphia Eagles ===
Studebaker was a sixth round selection with the 203rd overall pick by the Philadelphia Eagles in the 2008 NFL draft. He was waived by the Eagles on the last day of roster cuts on August 30, 2008 and subsequently re-signed on the team's practice squad.

=== Kansas City Chiefs ===
Studebaker was signed off the Eagles' practice squad by the Kansas City Chiefs on November 19, 2008, and played in his first career game against the Buffalo Bills on November 23, 2008. His first start was in Week 11 on November 22, 2009 against the Pittsburgh Steelers, in place of injured Mike Vrabel. In his first start, he intercepted Ben Roethlisberger twice, as the Chiefs won the game. On October 31, 2011 against the San Diego Chargers, Studebaker recovered an unlikely fumbled snap by quarterback Philip Rivers from amongst the scrum, likely aiding the Kansas City Chiefs in their improbable win that day by preventing the Chargers from scoring with just over a minute left in regulation. Studebaker had 16 tackles, one fumble recovery, and one forced fumble at the end of the season. While with the Chiefs, he was popularly known among fans as "The Student Baker."

On April 1, 2013, the Chiefs released Studebaker.

=== Jacksonville Jaguars ===
Studebaker was signed by the Jacksonville Jaguars on August 13, 2013. He was released by the team on September 1, 2013.

=== Indianapolis Colts (first stint) ===
On October 9, 2013, Studebaker signed with the Indianapolis Colts. He played in 11 games in 2013. In 2014, Studebaker played in 13 games, making one start. He became a free agent at the end of the season.

=== Tennessee Titans ===
On August 17, 2015, Studebaker signed with the Tennessee Titans. He was released by the team on September 4.

=== Indianapolis Colts (second stint) ===
On December 15, 2015, Studebaker was signed with the Colts. He was released by the team on February 22, 2016.

== NFL career statistics ==
Legend
| | Led the league |
| **Bold** | Career high |

=== Regular season ===
| Year | Team | Games | | Tackles | | | | | Interceptions | | | | | Fumbles | | | |
| Year | Team | GP | GS | Cmb | Solo | Ast | Sck | TFL | Int | Yds | TD | Lng | PD | FF | FR | Yds | TD |
|---|---|---|---|---|---|---|---|---|---|---|---|---|---|---|---|---|---|
| 2008 | KAN | 6 | 0 | 3 | 1 | 2 | 0.0 | 0 | 0 | 0 | 0 | 0 | 0 | 0 | 0 | 0 | 0 |
| 2009 | KAN | **16** | 2 | **28** | **24** | 4 | 0.0 | 0 | **2** | **96** | 0 | **94** | **3** | **1** | **1** | 0 | **1** |
| 2010 | KAN | **16** | 0 | **28** | 21 | 7 | **2.5** | **2** | 0 | 0 | 0 | 0 | 1 | 0 | 0 | 0 | 0 |
| 2011 | KAN | **16** | **5** | 16 | 8 | **8** | 0.0 | 0 | 0 | 0 | 0 | 0 | 0 | **1** | **1** | -1 | 0 |
| 2012 | KAN | **16** | 1 | 9 | 8 | 1 | 0.0 | 0 | 0 | 0 | 0 | 0 | 0 | 0 | 0 | 0 | 0 |
| 2013 | IND | 11 | 0 | 12 | 7 | 5 | 0.0 | 0 | 0 | 0 | 0 | 0 | 1 | 0 | 0 | 0 | 0 |
| 2014 | IND | 13 | 1 | 15 | 8 | 7 | 0.0 | 1 | 0 | 0 | 0 | 0 | 0 | **1** | **1** | 0 | 0 |
| 2015 | IND | 3 | 0 | 0 | 0 | 0 | 0.0 | 0 | 0 | 0 | 0 | 0 | 0 | 0 | 0 | 0 | 0 |
| Career | | 97 | 9 | 111 | 77 | 34 | 2.5 | 3 | 2 | 96 | 0 | 94 | 5 | 3 | 3 | -1 | 1 |

=== Playoffs ===
| Year | Team | Games | | Tackles | | | | | Interceptions | | | | | Fumbles | | | |
| Year | Team | GP | GS | Cmb | Solo | Ast | Sck | TFL | Int | Yds | TD | Lng | PD | FF | FR | Yds | TD |
|---|---|---|---|---|---|---|---|---|---|---|---|---|---|---|---|---|---|
| 2010 | KAN | 1 | 0 | 0 | 0 | 0 | 0.0 | 0 | 0 | 0 | 0 | 0 | 0 | 0 | 0 | 0 | 0 |
| 2013 | IND | 2 | 0 | **4** | 0 | **4** | 0.0 | 0 | 0 | 0 | 0 | 0 | 0 | 0 | 0 | 0 | 0 |
| 2014 | IND | **3** | 0 | 1 | 0 | 1 | 0.0 | 0 | 0 | 0 | 0 | 0 | 0 | 0 | 0 | 0 | 0 |
| Career | | 5 | 0 | 5 | 0 | 5 | 0.0 | 0 | 0 | 0 | 0 | 0 | 0 | 0 | 0 | 0 | 0 |
