= Greg Engel =

American football player (born 1971)

No. 60, 64, 51
- Position: Center

Personal information
- Born: January 18, 1971 (age 55); Davenport, Iowa, U.S.
- Listed height: 6 ft 3 in (1.91 m)
- Listed weight: 285 lb (129 kg)

Career information
- High school: Bloomington (Bloomington, Illinois)
- College: Illinois (1989–1993)
- NFL draft: 1994: undrafted

Career history
- San Diego Chargers (1994–1997); Oakland Raiders (1998)*; Florida Bobcats (1999)*; Berlin Thunder (1999); Detroit Lions (1999)
- * Offseason or practice squad member only

Awards and highlights
- Second-team All-Big Ten (1993)

Career NFL statistics
- Games played: 32
- Games started: 9
- Stats at Pro Football Reference

Gregory Allen Engel (born January 18, 1971) is an American former professional football player who was a center for four seasons in the National Football League (NFL) with the San Diego Chargers and Detroit Lions. He played college football for the Illinois Fighting Illini.

== Early life ==
Gregory Allen Engel was born on January 18, 1971, in Davenport, Iowa. He attended Bloomington High School in Bloomington, Illinois.

== College career ==
Engel attended the University of Illinois at Urbana-Champaign and was a member of the Fighting Illini from 1989 to 1993 and a four-year letterman from 1990 to 1993. He had a disk removed from his back in the summer of 1990 that caused him to miss three months. He made his debut in November 1990 after Curt Lovelace suffered an injury. Engel was then a three-year starter from 1991 to 1993. He was named second-team All-Big Ten by the Associated Press as a senior in 1993.

== Professional career ==
After going undrafted in the 1994 NFL draft, Engel signed with the San Diego Chargers on April 28, 1994. He made the team as the third-string center behind starter Courtney Hall and backup Curtis Whitley. He spent the 1994 season as a healthy scratch on the inactive list and did not play in any games. Engel played in ten regular season games and one postseason game in 1995. In 1996, he appeared in 12 games with nine starts. He then played in nine games during his final year with the Chargers in 1997. Engel became a free agent after the season and re-signed with the Chargers on February 13, 1998. He was released on July 23, 1998.

Engel signed with the Oakland Raiders on July 25, 1998. He was released on August 25, 1998.

Engel signed with the Florida Bobcats in March 1999. He was waived in early April 1999.

Engel was then a member of the Berlin Thunder of NFL Europe during the 1999 NFL Europe season and was listed as an offensive guard.

He was signed by the Detroit Lions on August 10, 1999, and played in one regular season game before being released on October 8, 1999.

== Personal life ==
Engel has worked in sales after his football career. His son Preston Engel also played football for the Fighting Illini.
