= Big Twelve Conference (Illinois) =

Athletic conference in Central Illinois

- Conference: IHSA
- No. of teams: 11
- Region: Central Illinois

Locations of Current Big Twelve Schools

The Big Twelve Conference is a high school athletic conference in the Illinois High School Association (IHSA), based in Central Illinois. While the name implies that the conference has twelve schools, there are actually only eleven schools currently active, due to other schools either closing, ending offering varsity athletics, or changing conferences.

The conference was indirectly responsible for the demise of the Capitol Conference in 1983 after voting to remove Springfield High School and add four schools from that conference.

All of the schools in the conference are located in cities on Interstate 74 which runs through central Illinois.

== History ==
The conference origins date back to 1925 with charter schools that included; Bloomington, Champaign, Danville, Stephen Decatur, Lincoln, Jacksonville, Mattoon, Pekin, Peoria Central, Peoria Manual, Springfield, and Urbana. Bloomington left the conference for a period between 1927 and 1932 and Jacksonville left permanently in 1932. Streator joined the league in 1932 and remained until 1958, the same year Pekin, Peoria Central and Peoria Manual departed. In 1983, the conference morphed again with the departure of Springfield High School and the addition of Champaign Centennial, Decatur Eisenhower, Decatur MacArthur, Normal Community, and Rantoul, bringing the total number of teams back to 12.

The league transitioned into a two-division, east–west format with Centennial, Central, Danville, Mattoon, Rantoul and Urbana in the East and Bloomington, Decatur, Eisenhower, MacArthur, Lincoln, and Normal in the West. Lincoln left the conference in 1994, however, Normal Community West entered the league in 1995. Stephen Decatur closed in 1999, bringing membership down to eleven. Rantoul departed in 2004, Mattoon left in 2012 and both Decatur schools, Eisenhower and MacArthur followed suit in 2013. Mattoon joined the Apollo Conference in order to play schools of similar size and Eisenhower and MacArthur joined the Central State Eight Conference Both schools were the final two schools from Decatur that remained in the conference, and the member schools of the CS8 are mostly from the Springfield area.

Starting with the 2014–2015 school year, four Peoria schools joined the Big Twelve, with the departure of the two Decatur schools. The four schools who joined are Manual High School, Peoria High School, Peoria Notre Dame High School, and Richwoods High School.

As of today. Champaign Central, Danville, and Urbana are the only continuous members to have stayed in the conference since its inception.

== Member schools ==
=== Current members ===
School	Town	Team name	Colors	Joined	IHSA	Reference
Bloomington High School	Bloomington	Purple Raiders		1925, 1932	AA, 2A, 3A	
Champaign Centennial High School	Champaign	Chargers		1983	AA, 2A, 3A	
Champaign Central High School	Champaign	Maroons		1925	AA, 2A, 3A	
Danville High School	Danville	Vikings		1925	AA, 2A, 3A	
Manual High School	Peoria	Rams		1925, 2014	AA, 1A, 2A	
Normal Community High School	Normal	Ironmen		1983	AA, 3A, 4A	
Normal Community West High School	Normal	Wildcats		1995	AA, 3A, 4A	
Peoria High School	Peoria	Lions		1925, 2014	AA, 2A, 3A	
Peoria Notre Dame High School	Peoria	Irish		2014	AA, 2A, 2A	
Richwoods High School	Peoria	Knights		2014	AA, 2A, 3A	
Urbana High School	Urbana	Tigers		1925	AA, 2A, 3A	

=== Former Members ===
School	Town	Team name	Colors	Year Joined	Year Left	Current Conference
Eisenhower High School	Decatur	Panthers		1983	2013	Central State Eight
Jacksonville High School	Jacksonville	Crimsons		1925	1932	Central State Eight
Lincoln High School	Lincoln	Railsplitters		1925	1994	Central State Eight
MacArthur High School	Decatur	Generals		1983	2013	Central State Eight
Mattoon High School	Mattoon	Green Wave		1925	2012	Apollo
Pekin High School	Pekin	Dragons		1925	1958	Mid-Illini
Rantoul Township High School	Rantoul	Eagles		1983	2012	Illini Prairie
Springfield High School	Springfield	Senators		1925	1983	Central State Eight
Stephen Decatur High School	Decatur	Reds		1925	2000	Closed in 2000
Streator Township High School	Streator	Bulldogs		1932	1958	Illinois Central Eight

=== Membership timeline ===
Beginning in 1925, the Big Twelve Conference competes in 11 boys, 13 girls and 13 coed sports and activities within the IHSA.

Big Twelve Conference full members Big Twelve members (non-football)

Left the conference for financial reasons
