= Justin Knoedler =

American baseball player (born 1980)

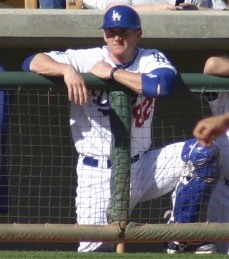
- Knoedler with the Los Angeles Dodgers in 2010
- Catcher
- Born: July 17, 1980 (age 46); Springfield, Illinois, U.S.
- Batted: Right Threw: Right

MLB debut
- October 3, 2004, for the San Francisco Giants

Last MLB appearance
- September 30, 2006, for the San Francisco Giants

MLB statistics
- Batting average: .111
- Home runs: 0
- Runs batted in: 0
- Stats at Baseball Reference

Teams
- San Francisco Giants (2004–2006)

Justin Joseph Knoedler (born July 17, 1980) is an American former Major League Baseball catcher.

== Professional career ==
Knoedler was born in Springfield, Illinois. He was originally drafted by the St. Louis Cardinals in the 41st round (1218th overall) in the 1998 Major League Baseball draft out of Springfield High School but did not sign with them. He was also taken in the 13th round (391st overall) of the 2000 MLB draft (after playing at Lincoln Land Community College) by the San Francisco Giants. Once again, he did not sign and chose to play college ball at Miami University. He entered the draft again in 2001, being taken by the Giants again, this time as a higher overall pick (166th overall in the 5th round). This time he signed a contract.

Knoedler began his professional career in 2001 as a pitcher for the Low-A Salem-Keizer Volcanoes. He appeared in 13 games, all in relief, and had a 1–1 record with a 1.26 ERA. He did long relief, pitching 28 2/3 innings with 38 strikeouts and only walked 9.

In 2002, Knoedler converted to catcher. He played for the Single-A Hagerstown Suns and in his first year as a catcher, he batted .257 with 5 home runs in 86 games. Knoedler was promoted to the High-A San Jose Giants in 2003. His batting average was the same from the previous year, but he doubled his home run total to 10.

Knoedler began the 2004 season with the Double-A Norwich Navigators. He played the full minor league season as he appeared in 115 games. He batted .274 with 9 home runs. He earned a September callup to the major leagues on September 6. He did not make his major league debut until the last game of the season on October 3 against the Los Angeles Dodgers. He entered the game as a defensive replacement for A. J. Pierzynski and he had one at-bat, flying out to center field.

Knoedler played in Double-A in 2005 for 4 games and mainly played for the Triple-A Fresno Grizzlies. He was with the major league club from August 2 to August 3 while Mike Matheny was on the bereavement list. The Giants called him back up in September. On September 12, against the San Diego Padres, he got his first big league hit, a pinch hit single off Akinori Otsuka.

Knoedler was called up by the Giants in September 2006. He appeared in 5 major league games for the Giants in 2006. Since then, he has not appeared in a major league game after spending the entire 2007 season in Triple-A.

Following the 2007 season, he became a minor league free agent. He signed a minor league contract with the Oakland Athletics on November 21, 2007 and was also invited to spring training, spending the 2008 season with the Sacramento River Cats. He signed a minor league contract with the St. Louis Cardinals after the season but did not make the club and was released after spring training. He subsequently signed a Minor League contract with the Florida Marlins on May 21, 2009. After a brief stint with the Marlins AAA team, the New Orleans Zephyrs, he was released and signed on August 22, 2009 with The Chicago White Sox, who assigned him to the Charlotte Knights, also in AAA.

On February 1, 2010, Knoedler signed a minor league contract with the Los Angeles Dodgers, with an invitation to spring training. He did not make the club and became a free agent.

== Personal life ==
He has a twin brother, Jason, who was also drafted in the 6th round of the 2001 draft by the Detroit Tigers. Jason spent his entire minor league career with the Tigers organization from 2001 to 2005 as an outfielder.
