= Brandon Hughes (American football) =

American football player (born 1986)

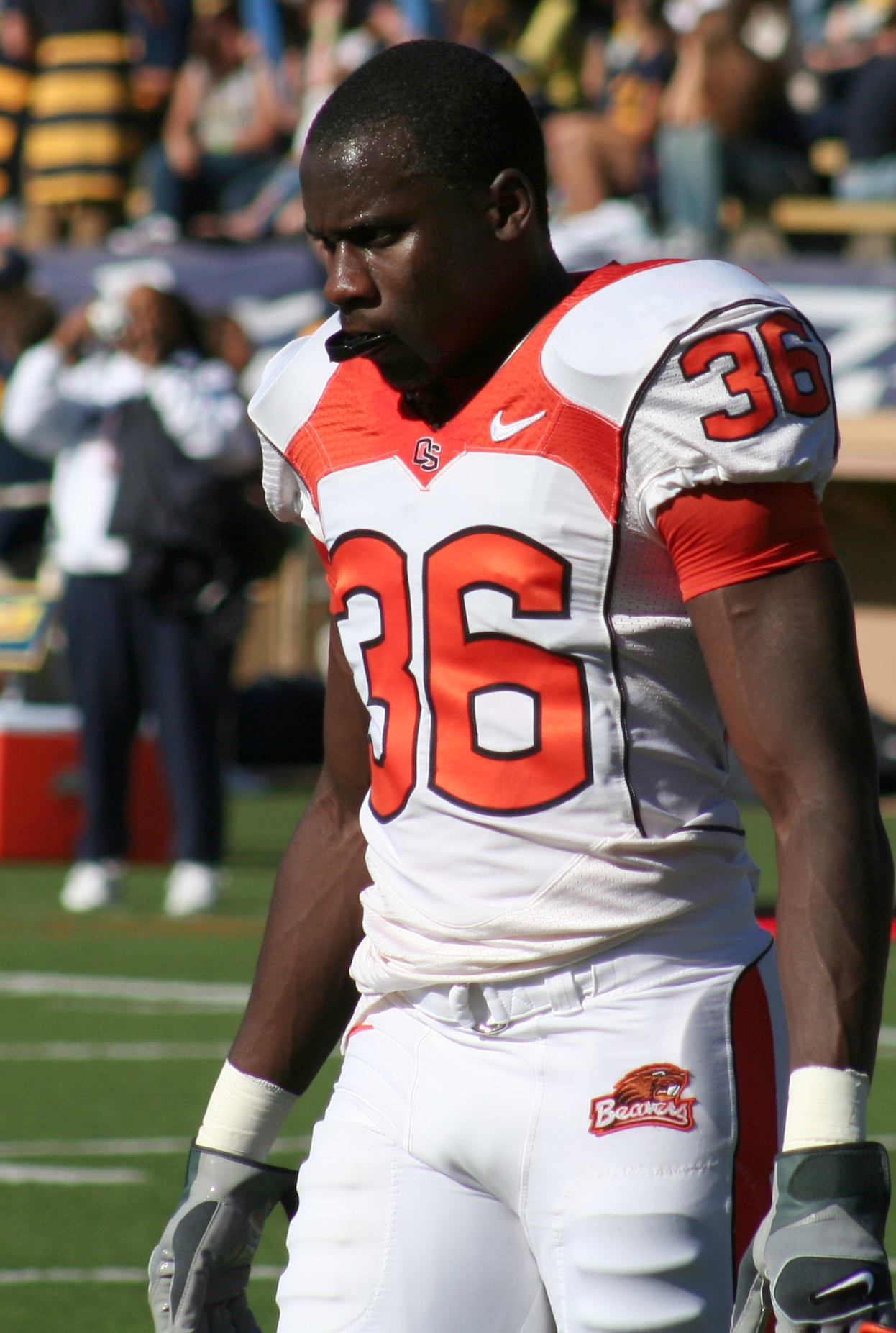
- Hughes during his tenure at Oregon State

No. 36, 27, 24
- Position: Cornerback

Personal information
- Born: May 23, 1986 (age 40); Bloomington, Illinois, U.S.
- Listed height: 5 ft 11 in (1.80 m)
- Listed weight: 185 lb (84 kg)

Career information
- High school: Bloomington
- College: Oregon State
- NFL draft: 2009: 5th round, 148th overall pick

Career history
- San Diego Chargers (2009); New York Giants (2010)*; Philadelphia Eagles (2010–2013); Cleveland Browns (2014)*
- * Offseason or practice squad member only

Awards and highlights
- 2× Second-team All-Pac-10 (2007, 2008)

Career NFL statistics
- Total tackles: 32
- Fumble recoveries: 1
- Pass deflections: 2
- Stats at Pro Football Reference

Brandon D. Hughes (born May 23, 1986) is an American former professional football player who was a cornerback in the National Football League (NFL). After playing college football for the Oregon State Beavers, he was selected by the San Diego Chargers in the fifth round of the 2009 NFL draft. He was also a member of the New York Giants, Philadelphia Eagles and Cleveland Browns, before retiring in 2014.

== Early life ==
Hughes attended Bloomington High School in Bloomington, Illinois, where he played wide receiver and cornerback on the football team.

== College career ==
Hughes redshirted during his first year playing at Oregon State University in 2004. He became a starting cornerback for the Beavers in his redshirt freshman season. Hughes and two other players were ejected from a November 10, 2007, game against Washington for a skirmish after a play. He recorded 57 tackles and 12 pass deflections in 2007. Hughes was named to the Jim Thorpe Award watchlist before his senior season in 2008. He was selected to the 2009 East–West Shrine Game following his college career in which he recorded 178 tackles and three interceptions.

== Professional career ==
=== San Diego Chargers ===
After running the 40-yard dash in 4.38 seconds at the 2009 NFL Scouting Combine, Hughes was selected by the San Diego Chargers in the fifth round (148th overall) of the 2009 NFL draft. He signed a four-year contract on June 20, 2009. After suffering a knee injury in a preseason game against the Atlanta Falcons, he was placed on injured reserve on September 1, 2009. He was released during final roster cuts in September 2010.

=== New York Giants ===
The New York Giants signed Hughes to their practice squad on September 10, 2010.

=== Philadelphia Eagles ===
Hughes was signed off the Giants' practice squad by the Philadelphia Eagles on November 23, 2010, to fill the slot vacated after cornerback Ellis Hobbs was placed on the injured reserve. He played in one game in 2010, the final game of the season as the Eagles rested their starters in preparation for the playoffs. In 2011, Hughes played in 13 games, started one, and recorded 16 tackles throughout those games. On September 23, 2012, the Eagles announced that they signed Hughes to a one-year extension. On September 7, 2013, Hughes was released by the Eagles. On September 10, 2013, Hughes was re-signed by the Eagles. On September 23, 2013, Hughes was released by the Eagles with an injury settlement.

=== Cleveland Browns ===
Hughes signed with the Cleveland Browns on January 2, 2014. Hughes was released from the Browns on May 12, 2014.

== Post-football career ==
In 2025, Hughes was hired as police officer by the Falls Township police department in Bucks County, Pennsylvania. He also owns a gym in Middletown Township.
