= Richard Fortman =

Checkers Player

Richard Lee Fortman (February 8, 1915 – November 8, 2008) was a champion checkers player and authority on the game.

== Early years ==
Richard Lee Fortman was born on February 8, 1915, in Springfield, Illinois, which was his home throughout his life. His father was a telegraph operator for a railroad, and he would play checkers over the telegraph with other operators during quiet times, playing the games in their heads to avoid detection.

He started playing checkers at home with his father. He started winning these games after he started reading checkers books at the library. He entered the Illinois state checkers championship in 1933 at age 18 and finished in third place. He would go on to win the Illinois state title on six occasions between 1950 and 1978.

== Career ==
Fortman graduated from Springfield High School in 1933. He served in the United States Army during World War II in North Africa and Italy. After the war, he became a warehouse foreman for the Panhandle Eastern Pipe Line Company.

He published the seven-volume guide to the game, Basic Checkers, considered essential reading for those interested in the game.

Fortman's specialty was correspondence checkers, in which players could take as much as two to three days to consider the board and return the next move to his opponent by postcard, with games taking as long as months or even a year. Fortman won the world postal championship in both 1986 and 1990.

He adapted to the technological changes in the game and would spend hours each day playing checkers over the internet. The first signs that he was in declining health came when he failed to respond to moves in the allotted time.

== Death ==
Fortman died at age 93 on November 8, 2008, in Springfield, Illinois. He was survived briefly by his wife, the former Faye Nichols, who died at age 83 on January 4, 2009. The two married on October 14, 1950, and had celebrated their 58th wedding anniversary.
