= Normal Community High School =

Location
- 3900 East Raab Road; Normal, Illinois 61761; United States; 40.53329°N 88.91446°W

Information
- School type: Public, secondary school
- Established: 1905; 121 years ago
- School district: Unit 5
- CEEB code: 143200
- Principal: Adam Zbrozek
- Staff: 133.37 (FTE)
- Grades: 9–12
- Gender: coeducational
- Enrollment: 2,111 (2023–2024)
- Student to teacher ratio: 15.83
- Colors: Orange; Black
- Athletics conference: Big Twelve
- Nickname: Ironmen
- Newspaper: The Inkspot
- Website: normalcommunity.unit5.org

Normal Community High School (NCHS or Normal Community) is a public high school located in Normal, Illinois that was founded in 1905. NCHS serves parts of Normal, Bloomington, and Towanda and is home to over 2,000 students (grades 9–12) with 150 faculty and staff.

== History ==
Normal Community High School was founded in 1905.

An early NCHS building was built in 1927. It had 14 classrooms, a gymnasium, library, and administrative offices. The average enrollment was 350. By 1954, NCHS had grown to the point where additional classrooms and facilities were needed. This resulted in two additions, one at the north end, housing a cafeteria and music and speech classrooms, and one at the south end, housing a new gymnasium, physics lab, agriculture lab, metals lab, woodworking lab and electronics lab.

Again, in 1967, the growth of the community and increased enrollment resulted in an addition to the NCHS building. This included another new gymnasium (Neuman), a new cafeteria, a new library, new biology and chemistry labs, an automotive lab, new classrooms and office space for the Unit 5 Superintendent. Average student enrollment after this addition was over 1,350 students, peaking at 1,956 in 1974, immediately before the opening of Parkside Junior High School and the movement of 9th grade students to Chiddix and Parkside.

The explosive growth of the Unit 5 population base in the 1980s and 1990s, which continues to the present time, led to a need for another high school in Normal, and in 1995, Normal Community West High School, often called simply Normal West, was completed. Some students who would have attended NCHS were transferred to Normal West when the latter opened. Athletic and other rivalries continue to exist between the two schools.

On March 21, 2000, the Unit 5 Referendum was passed. This referendum approved a spending budget of over $73 million, of which the State of Illinois would fund nearly $18 million for new construction and renovation of Unit 5 facilities. A new campus opened for NCHS on an entirely new site on Raab Road, northeast of Normal, in August 2003.

A portion of the previous NCHS building was remodeled and became a new junior high school (Kingsley Junior High School) for Unit 5. The original 1927 construction was torn down and the 1954 and 1967 sections were completely updated.

In the fall of 2003, NCHS officially opened at its new location on Raab Road. This marked the beginning of the first school year at Normal Community's new location.

NCHS became the scene of a widely publicized school shooting on September 7, 2012, when a student fired gunshots into the ceiling of a classroom and was tackled by a teacher. Nobody was injured. A 14-year-old student was arrested and charged with 16 felony counts.

== Academics and courses ==
Some departments offer Advanced Placement (AP) classes. There are classes with several different levels of workload for students of different abilities. There are a few honors classes offered by the Science, Mathematics, and English departments. They include Biology, Chemistry, Algebra II, Geometry, and English I and II.

According to the Illinois State Board of Education's online Report Card, 86% of NCHS students in the class of 2012, the most recent class for which the Report Card has information, graduated within four years, down from a peak of 95% in 2010, and 60% were ready for college coursework compared to a 46% average for Illinois high schools. The school did not make Adequate Yearly Progress according to the terms of the No Child Left Behind Act. Note that Adequate Yearly Progress is difficult to achieve when graduation rates are already very high, as they are for NCHS; the school has not been identified for School Improvement according to the AYP specifications of the Act.

== Athletics and other activities ==
The mascot for the athletic teams representing NCHS is the "Ironmen." The "Ironmen" mascot came about after a 1934 football game where NCHS went up against Bloomington High School. After the game a local reporter called the NCHS team a team of ironmen and the name stuck. The school currently plays basketball, football, etc., as a member of the "Big Twelve" Conference along with its crosstown rivals at Normal West, Bloomington High School, and others, although there are presently fewer than twelve teams in the Big Twelve owing to the departures of some schools to conferences with schools more nearly their own size. NCHS teams played for many years in the Corn Belt Conference but eventually departed due to school-size issues.

== Demographics ==
According to the Illinois State Board of Education's online Report Card, the student body as of the 2015-2016 school year was composed of the following ethnicities: 66.1% White, 11.9% Black, 7.7% Hispanic, 8.6% Asian, 0.5% American Indian, 4.9% Multi Racial/Ethnicity, and 0.5% Pacific Islander. 26.6% of the student body qualified as Low Income Students, and 12.5% received special education services.

== Notable alumni ==
- Tom Ashbrook, journalist
- Omar Clayton, football player
- Marcellus Johnson, football player
- Adam Kinzinger, Illinois Congressman
- John D. LeMay, actor
- Ryan Martinie, bassist from Mudvayne
- Gordon Ropp, Illinois state representatives and farmer
- Mike Wells, football player
