= McLean County Unit District No. 5 =

School district in McLean County, Illinois

Address
- 1809 West Hovey Avenue Normal, McLean County, Illinois, 61761; United States
- Coordinates: 40.502434°N 89.021343°W

District information
- Type: Public
- Motto: Working together for quality public education
- Grades: K to 12
- Established: May 8, 1948
- Superintendent: Mark Daniel
- Asst. superintendent(s): Sandra Wilson
- Schools: 17 elementary schools 4 junior high schools 2 high schools 1 vocational school
- Budget: $147 million (2014–2015)
- NCES District ID: 1728620

Students and staff
- Students: 13,561 (2014–2015)
- Staff: 1,650

Other information
- Website: www.unit5.org

McLean County Unit District No. 5 (legally Community Unit School District No. 5, usually shortened to Unit 5) is a unit school district in McLean County, Illinois and a small portion of Woodford County, Illinois.

A public election on 8 May 1948 created the school district. The district covers 11 congressional townships, including all of the communities of Carlock, Hudson, Normal, and Towanda. It also covers parts of Bloomington not in Bloomington Public Schools District 87.

As of 2011, the district has around 13,000 students and 1,850 full- and part-time staff across 17 elementary, 4 junior high, and 2 high school buildings. The two high schools are Normal Community High School and Normal Community West High School.

== Schools ==
=== Elementary schools ===
- Benjamin Elementary School
- Brigham Elementary School
- Carlock Elementary School
- Cedar Ridge Elementary School
- Fairview Elementary School
- Fox Creek Elementary School
- Glenn Elementary School
- Grove Elementary School
- Colene Hoose Elementary School
- Hudson Elementary School
- Northpoint Elementary School
- Oakdale Elementary School
- Parkside Elementary School
- Pepper Ridge Elementary School
- Prairieland Elementary School
- Sugar Creek Elementary School
- Towanda Elementary School

=== Junior high schools ===
- Chiddix Junior High School
- Evans Junior High School
- Kingsley Junior High School
- Parkside Junior High School

=== High schools ===
- Normal Community High School
- Normal Community West High School

== School Hours ==
Elementary Schools Regular Daily: 7:45 am to 2:30 pm Early Release: 7:45 am to 10:45

High Schools Regular Daily: 8:30 am to 3:30 pm Early Release: 8:30 am to 11:30

Junior High Schools Regular Daily: 8:45 am to 3:45 Early Release: 8:45 am to 11:45
