= Springfield School District 186 =

School district in Illinois, United States

Address
- 1900 West Monroe Street Springfield, Illinois, 62704; United States

District information
- Type: Public
- Grades: PreK–12
- NCES District ID: 1737080

Students and staff
- Students: 13,483

Other information
- Website: www.sps186.org

Springfield School District No. 186, known as Springfield Public Schools (SPS), is a unit school district in Sangamon County, Illinois. Its territory includes most of the city of Springfield, Illinois, its four inner suburbs of Grandview, Leland Grove, Jerome, and Southern View, and some rural areas immediately north of Springfield. As of 2017, some Springfield's newest neighborhoods lie outside the district and increasing residents are moving there.

== History ==
The school system was formed in 1854 by state statute, granting the city of Springfield a school charter with power exercised by the Springfield city council. In 1869 the charter was amended to devolve power to a nine-person school board appointed by the city council. As a result of Springfield having over 35,000 population in the 1910 Census, state law caused the nine-person board to be replaced with a seven-person board of education elected by the public, starting in April 1911.

During the turn of the century, the district had operated a teachers training school for 32 years.

== Statistics ==
District 186 operates 23 elementary schools, 5 middle schools, 2 K-8 schools, 3 high schools, and 4 additional schools for alternative or adult education. Total enrollment in 2019 was 14,063 students, down from 15,048 in 2015. The district employs 1,020 teachers.

== Schools ==
=== High Schools ===
- Lanphier High School
- Springfield Southeast High School
- Springfield High School

=== Middle Schools ===
- Franklin Middle School
- Grant Middle School
- Jefferson Middle School
- Lincoln Magnet School
- Washington Middle School

=== K-8 ===
- Ball Charter School
- Iles School- grade 1-8

=== Elementary ===
- Addams Elementary School
- Black Hawk Elementary School
- Butler Elementary School
- Dubois Elementary School
- Enos Elementary School
- Fairview Elementary School
- Feitshans Elementary School
- Graham Elementary School
- Harvard Park Elementary School
- Hazel Dell Elementary School
- Laketown Elementary School
- Lee School
- Lindsay Elementary School
- Marsh Elementary School
- Matheny-Withrow Elementary School
- McClernand Elementary School
- Ridgely Elementary School
- Sandburg Elementary School
- Southern View Elementary School
- Wilcox Elementary School

=== Alternative Education ===
- Springfield Learning Academy (grade 9-12)
