= Springfield High School (Illinois) =

Public high school in Illinois

Location
- 101 South Lewis Street; Springfield, Illinois 62704; United States; 39.801°N 89.661°W

Information
- School type: public secondary
- Opened: 1857
- School district: Springfield School District 186
- Superintendent: Jennifer Gill
- Principal: Lisa Leardi
- Faculty: 103
- Grades: 9–12
- Gender: co-ed
- Enrollment: 1,438 (2023-24)
- Average class size: 23
- Campus type: Urban
- Colors: red black
- Slogan: We Are Springfield
- Athletics conference: Central State Eight
- Mascot: Solon
- Team name: Senators
- Newspaper: The Senator
- Yearbook: Capitoline
- Website: https://www.sps186.org/o/springfield

Springfield High School (SHS) is a public secondary school located in Springfield, Illinois, United States. It is the oldest of the three high schools in Springfield School District 186 (the other two being Southeast High School and Lanphier High School). The school draws mainly from the west side of Springfield.

While the school opened in 1857, the current building was opened in 1916. A number of notable alumni have called the school home, with the writer Vachel Lindsay being the most associated with the town, which featured prominently in his writings.

== Building history and architecture ==
Springfield High School opened on 4 September 1857 in a small building on Market Street, now known as Capitol Avenue. It was located in this building for only a single school year before it moved to the Academy Building on South 5th Street near Monroe until 1864. In 1865, a $65,000 school building was completed for the high school and was located on 4th and Madison Street. Due to congestion, Central High School was built in 1897, but was already overcrowded by 1915.

In 1917, Springfield High School opened at 101 S. Lewis St, previously the site of a church and Hutchinson Cemetery. The church was gone, but there were still gravestones and remains that were moved to Oak Ridge Cemetery before construction could begin. The construction had a cost of $500,000 and could support up to 1,500 students.

There are four mosaics on the exterior walls of the building completed by Henry Chapman Mercer. The original molds are a part of the Moravian Pottery and Tile Works.

== Academics ==
In 2008, SHS had an average composite ACT score of 22.0, and graduated 91.0% of its senior class. Springfield High School has not made Adequate Yearly Progress (AYP) on the Prairie State Achievement Examination, which with the ACT, comprise the State of Illinois' assessment as part of the federal No Child Left Behind Act. The school, overall, did not meet AYP in mathematics, and two student subgroups failed to meet AYP in both mathematics and reading.

SHS offers 14 AP classes, including Biology, Chemistry, and Physics C. Other AP classes available include Art History, German Language and Culture, and Psychology.

== Student life ==
=== Activities ===
33 student clubs are hosted at SHS, ranging from academic and foreign language to school spirit and philanthropic. Among the national organizations with chapters or affiliates at the school are Junior State of America, Model United Nations, and the National Honor Society.

The school's scholastic bowl team finished fourth at the IHSA state championship tournament in 2008, as well as second in 2021.

=== Athletics ===
Springfield High School competes in the Central State Eight Conference, and is a member of the Illinois High School Association (IHSA), which governs most interscholastic athletics and competitive activities in Illinois. Teams are stylized as the "Senators".

SHS sponsors interscholastic athletic teams for young men and women in basketball, cross country, golf, soccer, swimming & diving, tennis, and track & field. Young men may compete in baseball, football, and wrestling, while young women may compete in cheerleading, softball, and volleyball.

The following teams have finished in the top four of their respective IHSA sponsored state championship tournaments or meets:

- Baseball: State Champions (2020–21); 2nd place x2 (1984–85, 2015–16)
- Basketball (boys'): State Champions x3 (1916–17, 1934–35, 1958–59); 2nd place x3 (1914–15, 1918–19, 1932–33); 3rd place (1966–67); 4th place (1915–16)
- Basketball (girls'): 3rd place x2 (2009–10, 2010–11); 4th place x2 (2008–09, 2011–12)
- Cross Country (boys'): 2nd place x2 (2010–11, 2018–19); 3rd place (2009–10); 4th place x4 (2007–08, 2011–12, 2014–15, 2017–18)
- Cross Country (girls'): State Champions (2009–10); 3rd place (2010–11); 4th place (2011–12)
- Golf (boys'): 4th place x3 (1952–53, 1953–54, 1986–87)
- Golf (girls'): 2nd place x2 (1984–85, 1985–86)
- Soccer (boys'): State Champions (1997–98); 3rd place (2014–15)
- Soccer (girls'): 3rd place (2024–25)
- Softball: 3rd place (1991–92)
- Tennis (boys'): 4th place (1949–50)
- Track & Field (boys'): 2nd place x2 (1945–46, 1946–47); 3rd place x2 (1892–93, 1918–19); 4th place x5 (1894–95, 1913–14, 1915–16, 1919–20, 1921–22)
- Track & Field (girls'): 3rd place (2010–11); 4th place (2013–14)

=== Fine arts ===
Springfield has three choir groups and one showchoir (Seven and Senators, Scarlet Harmony, Mixed Chorus, and IN Session Showchoir). The "IN Session" showchoir is an extracurricular activity who rehearses two nights a week. IN Session showchoir is a choir that combine choral singing with dance. Started in 2011, IN Session performs around the city of Springfield and competes around the Midwest. Since 2011, IN Session showchoir has won numerous awards and has been rank by the Nation showchoir rank system.

The school has a marching band, which performs at home football games and at other local events, and two pep bands, which take turns playing at home basketball games. For the concert season there are three groups (Concert Band, Symphonic Band, and Wind Ensemble). There are also two jazz bands and a flute choir, along with a clarinet choir.

The school stages a play each autumn and a musical each spring. Recent musicals include Cats, created by Andrew Lloyd Webber, Legally Blonde, Hairspray, and "Beauty and the Beast."

=== PLATO (computer system) ===
The only remote PLATO III terminal was at Springfield High School. It was connected to the PLATO III system by a video connection and a separate dedicated line for keyboard data.

== Notable alumni ==
- Charles A. Bane (class of 1930) was a prominent jurist and civil rights activist. He was nominated by President Richard Nixon to the United States Court of Appeals for the Seventh Circuit, but never confirmed.
- Thom Bishop (class of 1969) is a songwriter, author, producer, playwright, and educator.
- Thomas A. Broady (class of 1896) was a ragtime piano composer and performer.
- Cheri Bustos (class of 1979) served as the U.S. representative from Illinois's 17th congressional district from 2013 to 2023.
- Ines Catron Hoffmann (class of 1921), lawyer, city official in Springfield
- J. Edward Day (class of 1932) was a lawyer and political appointee who served as Illinois State Insurance Commissioner before being appointed U.S. Postmaster General (1961–63) by President John F. Kennedy.
- Toy Dorgan (class of 1963) is a former speed skater who placed 14th in the 3,000 meter event at the 1968 Winter Olympics. She later took up cross-country skiing, winning the Australian national championship five times.
- John Porter East (class of 1949) was a U.S. Senator from North Carolina (1981–86).
- Ruth Ellis was the oldest known open lesbian, and an LGBT rights activist. Her life was the subject of a documentary, Living With Pride: Ruth C. Ellis @ 100. She formed the Ruth Ellis Center, a social service agency dedicated to helping LGBTQ teens and youth adults experiencing homelessness.
- Robert Fitzgerald (class of 1928) is known for translating many Greek texts into the English versions that many consider the standard. From 1984–85, he was Consultant in Poetry to the Library of Congress, the equivalent of Poet Laureate of the United States.
- Richard Fortman (class of 1933) was a champion checkers player and authority on the game.
- Jerry Fry (class of 1974) is a former Major League Baseball player, briefly playing for the Montreal Expos in 1978.
- William Howarth (class of 1958) was a writer and professor at Princeton University. He studied the relationship between man and nature, especially as expressed in literature.
- Justin Knoedler (class of 1998) was a catcher for the San Francisco Giants (2004–06).
- Vachel Lindsay (class of 1897) was a poet (The Golden Book of Springfield, Bryan, Bryan, Bryan, Bryan, Abraham Lincoln Walks at Midnight).
- William H. Luers (class of 1947) is a career United States Foreign Service officer who served as United States Ambassador to Venezuela (1978–82) and Czechoslovakia (1983–86). He later served as president of the Metropolitan Museum of Art.
- James S. Martin Jr. (class of 1938) was the NASA Project Manager for the Viking program.
- Steve McClure is an Illinois Senator who represents the 54th district.
- Jared Palomar (class of 2002) is a bass player for the California-based band Augustana.
- Robin Roberts (baseball) played professional baseball and is in the Baseball Hall of Fame. He attended SHS for two years before the boundaries changed and he was relocated to Lanphier High School.
- Dave Robisch (class of 1967) played professional basketball in both the ABA and NBA (1971–84). His uniform number 40 is retired by the University of Kansas.
- Rashad Rochelle (class of 2022) is an NFL wide receiver for the Seattle Seahawks
- Ducky Schofield (class of 1953) is a former MLB player for the St. Louis Cardinals, Pittsburgh Pirates, San Francisco Giants, New York Yankees, Los Angeles Dodgers, Boston Red Sox, and Milwaukee Brewers.
- Hiram Sherman was an actor, both on television, and on Broadway. He twice won a Tony Award (Two's Company, How Now Dow Jones).
- Edward Sternaman was a running back for the Chicago Bears. From 1920 to 1932 he was the co-owner of the Bears with George Halas.
- Joey Sternaman was a professional football quarterback (1922–30), playing most of his career with the Chicago Bears.
- N. Ronald Thunman (class of 1949) served 35 years of active duty in the United States Navy, rising to the rank of vice-admiral. His work included Deputy Chief of Naval Operations for Submarine Warfare and Chief of Naval Education and Training. Thunman was the commander of the first-year class of John McCain.
- Bob Trumpy (class of 1963) is a former Pro Bowl tight end for the Cincinnati Bengals (1968–77). He is currently a broadcaster with the NFL on Westwood One.
- Harlington Wood Jr. (class of 1938) was a jurist and lawyer who served on the United States District Court for the Southern District of Illinois (1973–76) and United States Court of Appeals for the Seventh Circuit (1976–2008). While working for the United States Department of Justice in 1973, he led negotiations that ended the Wounded Knee incident.
