= Cody White (offensive guard) =

American football player (born 1988)

No. 67
- Position: Guard

Personal information
- Born: July 1, 1988 (age 38); Columbus, Ohio, U.S.
- Listed height: 6 ft 3 in (1.91 m)
- Listed weight: 303 lb (137 kg)

Career information
- High school: Normal Community West (Normal, Illinois)
- College: Illinois State
- NFL draft: 2012: undrafted

Career history
- Houston Texans (2012–2015)

Career NFL statistics
- Games played: 1
- Stats at Pro Football Reference

Cody White (born July 1, 1988) is an American former professional football player who was an offensive guard in the National Football League (NFL). He played college football for the Illinois State Redbirds.

== Professional career ==
Pre-draft measurables
| Height | Weight | 40-yard dash | 10-yard split | 20-yard split | 20-yard shuttle | Three-cone drill | Vertical jump | Broad jump | Bench press |
|---|---|---|---|---|---|---|---|---|---|
| 6 ft 3 3/8 in (1.91 m) | 303 lb (137 kg) | 4.97 s | 1.73 s | 2.83 s | 4.59 s | 7.65 s | 33.0 in (0.84 m) | 9 ft 1 in (2.77 m) | 31 reps |
All values from Pro Day

On April 29, 2012, he signed with the Houston Texans as an undrafted free agent. On August 31, 2012, he was released by the team. On September 3, 2012, he was signed to the practice squad. He was released by the team on September 1, 2015.
