= Simon E. Lantz =

American politician and farmer (1872-1952)

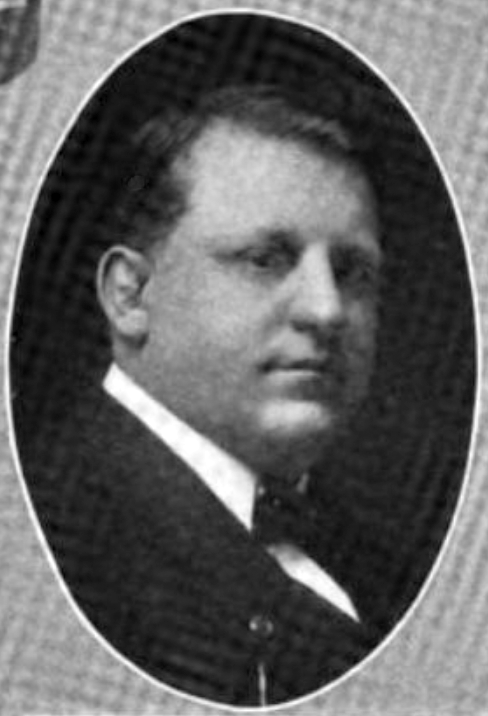

Member of the Illinois State Senate
- In office 1916–1952

Member of the Illinois House of Representatives
- In office 1914–1916

Personal details
- Born: Simon Everett Lantz; April 12, 1872 Carlock, Illinois
- Died: December 27, 1952 (aged 80) Peoria, Illinois
- Party: Republican
- Education: University of Illinois Urbana-Champaign
- Occupation: Farmer, politician

Simon Everett Lantz (April 12, 1872 – December 27, 1952) was an American farmer, livestock breeder, and politician.

== Biography ==
Born in Carlock, Illinois, Lantz went to the public schools and graduated from the University of Illinois Urbana-Champaign in 1896. He lived in Congerville, Illinois and was a farmer and livestock breeder. Lantz served on the Woodford County, Illinois Board of Commissioners and was chairman of the county board. In 1915, Lantz served in the Illinois House of Representatives and was a Republican. Lantz then served in the Illinois State Senate from 1917 until his death in 1952. Lantz died in a hospital in Peoria, Illinois after suffering a heart attack at his home in Congerville.
