= Ines Catron Hoffmann =

American lawyer (1905–1994)

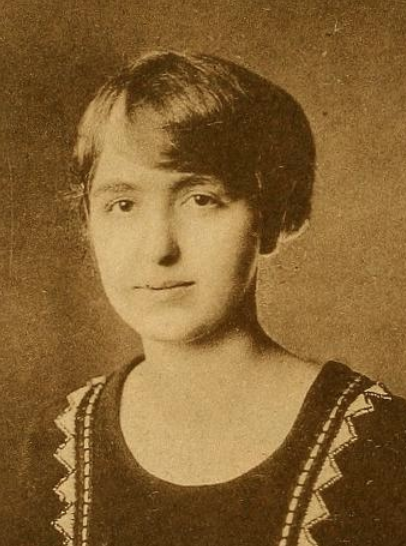
- Catron, from the 1925 yearbook of Wellesley College
- Born: Ines Virginia Catron; October 15, 1905; Springfield, Illinois, U.S.
- Died: June 20, 1994 (aged 88); Springfield, Illinois, U.S.
- Occupation: Lawyer
- Years active: 1928-1990

Ines Virginia Catron Hoffmann (October 15, 1905 – June 20, 1994) was an American lawyer and city official, based in Springfield, Illinois.

== Early life and education ==
Catron was born in Springfield, the daughter of Bayard Lacey Catron and Agnes Fullenwider Catron. Her father was a lawyer. She graduated from Springfield High School in 1921, and from Wellesley College in 1925. She was a member of Phi Beta Kappa and president of the debating society at Wellesley.

Catron earned a law degree from the University of Chicago Law School in 1928. She was student editor of the Illinois Law Review. She won a cash prize as the student with the highest grade average at the University of Chicago Law School.

== Career ==
Hoffmann practiced law with her father and brother from 1929 to 1944, and with her husband from 1945 to 1987. She was named City Corporation Counsel in 1955, and became the second woman to serve on the Springfield City Council in 1958. She was appointed financial commissioner in 1957, chaired the Sangamon County Republican Central Committee, was vice-chair of the Illinois Air Pollution Control Board in the 1960s,. and served on the board of the Springfield Housing Authority from 1969 to 1981.

Hoffmann was active with the YWCA, the Daughters of the American Revolution, Zonta International, League of Women Voters, AAUW, and other charities. She was the first female elder at Springfield's First Presbyterian Church, and chaired the congregation's women's assembly. In 1963 she was named one of the nation's top 10 businesswomen by the American Business Women's Association. She gave an oral history interview to the University of Illinois Springfield in 1975.

== Personal life ==
Catron married a law school classmate, George Clarence Hoffmann in 1929. They had four sons. Her husband died in 1993, and she died in 1994, at the age of 88, in Springfield.
