= Herman E. Brockman =

American geneticist (1934–2025)

- Brockman in 1974
- Born: Herman Eldon Brockman; February 4, 1934; Danforth, Illinois, U.S.
- Died: April 8, 2025 (aged 91); Congerville, Illinois, U.S.
- Education: Blackburn College; Northwestern University; Florida State University
- Occupation: Geneticist

Herman Eldon Brockman (February 4, 1934 – April 8, 2025) was an American geneticist.

== Life and career ==
Brockman was born in Danforth, Illinois, the son of Fred Brockman and Henrietta Zeedyk. He attended Blackburn College, graduating in 1956. After graduating, he attended Northwestern University, earning his MS degree in 1957. He also attended Florida State University, earning his PhD degree in 1960, which after earning his degrees, he worked as a postdoctoral fellow in the biology division at Oak Ridge National Laboratory.

Brockman served as a professor in the department of biological science at Illinois State University from 1963 to 1998. During his years as a professor, in 1982, he was named a distinguished professor.

== Death ==
Brockman died on April 8, 2025, in Congerville, Illinois, at the age of 91.
