= Congerville, Illinois =

Congerville
- Village
- Location of Congerville in Woodford County, Illinois.
- Coordinates: 40°37′00″N 89°12′18″W
- Country: United States
- State: Illinois
- County: Woodford

Area
  - Total: 0.97 sq mi (2.50 km^{2})
  - Land: 0.96 sq mi (2.49 km^{2})
  - Water: 0.0039 sq mi (0.01 km^{2})
- Elevation: 742 ft (226 m)

Population (2020)
  - Total: 497
  - Density: 516.3/sq mi (199.35/km^{2})
- Time zone: UTC-6 (CST)
  - Summer (DST): UTC-5 (CDT)
- ZIP code: 61729
- Area code: 309
- FIPS code: 17-16119
- GNIS feature ID: 2398616

Congerville is a village in Woodford County, Illinois, United States. As of the 2020 census, Congerville had a population of 497. Congerville is part of the Peoria, Illinois Metropolitan Statistical Area.

== History ==
The site of Congerville was surveyed for Joseph Schrock on January 2, 1888, and the village was known as Schrock. The name was changed to Conger on February 27, 1888, after the early settler Ben Conger, and then to Congerville on July 31, 1888.

== Geography ==
After a January 5, 1999, reading of −36 °F (−38 °C), Congerville held the record for the coldest temperature ever officially recorded in Illinois. It took this title from Mount Carroll—which had recorded −35 °F (−37 °C) in 1930—and lost it to the same town on January 31, 2019, when the temperature there dropped to −38 °F (−39 °C).

According to the 2010 census, Congerville has a total area of 1.124 square miles (2.91 km^{2}), of which 1.12 square miles (2.90 km^{2}) (or 99.64%) is land and 0.004 square miles (0.01 km^{2}) (or 0.36%) is water.

== Demographics ==
Historical population
Census	Pop.	Note	%±
1970	266		—
1980	373		40.2%
1990	397		6.4%
2000	466		17.4%
2010	474		1.7%
2020	497		4.9%
U.S. Decennial Census

As of the census of 2000, there were 466 people, 163 households, and 131 families residing in the village. The population density was 615.3 inhabitants per square mile (237.6/km^{2}). There were 167 housing units at an average density of 220.5 per square mile (85.1/km^{2}). The racial makeup of the village was 98.93% White, 0.43% Native American, 0.21% Asian, and 0.43% from two or more races. None of the population is African American, Pacific Islander, Hispanic or Latino of any race, or from other races.

There were 163 households, out of which 37.4% had children under the age of 18 living with them, 74.2% were married couples living together, 2.5% had a female householder with no husband present, and 19.6% were non-families. 17.2% of all households were made up of individuals, and 4.9% had someone living alone who was 65 years of age or older. The average household size was 2.86 and the average family size was 3.27.

In the village, the population was spread out, with 28.5% under the age of 18, 11.8% from 18 to 24, 30.3% from 25 to 44, 19.1% from 45 to 64, and 10.3% who were 65 years of age or older. The median age was 30 years. For every 100 females, there were 103.5 males. For every 100 females age 18 and over, there were 104.3 males.

The median income for a household in the village was $51,786, and the median income for a family was $60,313. Males had a median income of $45,673 versus $25,132 for females. The per capita income for the village was $20,795. None of the families and 0.7% of the population were living below the poverty line, including no under eighteens and 2.8% of those over 64.

== Notable people ==
- Herman E. Brockman, geneticist
- Simon E. Lantz, Illinois farmer and politician, lived in Congerville.
- Andy Studebaker, outside linebacker for the Philadelphia Eagles, Kansas City Chiefs and Indianapolis Colts
