= Bloomington School District 87 =

School district in McLean County, Illinois, United States

Address
- 301 East Monroe St. Bloomington, McLean County, Illinois; United States
- Coordinates: 40.481314°N 88.990760°W

District information
- Type: Public
- Grades: PreK to 12
- Established: February 16, 1857
- President: Mark Wiley
- Superintendent: David Mouser
- Asst. superintendent(s): Sherrilyn Thomas; Diane Wolf
- Schools: 1 early education school 6 elementary schools 1 junior high school 1 high school 1 vocational school
- Budget: $11,765 per student (2012)
- NCES District ID: 1706480

Students and staff
- Students: 53026
- Teachers: 347.18 (on an FTE basis)

Other information
- Website: www.district87.org

Bloomington School District 87, often shortened to District 87, is a school district in Bloomington, Illinois. The district has six elementary schools, a junior high school, and a high school as well as a vocational school and an early education (PreK) school. In the 2014–2015 school year District 87 had 5615 total students and 703 employees. It is ringed by McLean County Unit District No. 5.

District 87 was established 16 February 1857 as one of the first school districts in Illinois.

== Schools ==
=== Early education ===
- Sarah E. Raymond School of Early Education

=== Elementary schools ===
- Bent Elementary School
- Irving Elementary School
- Oakland Elementary School
- Sheridan Elementary School
- Stevenson Elementary School
- Washington Elementary School

=== Junior high school ===
- Bloomington Junior High School

=== High school ===
- Bloomington High School

=== Vocational school ===
- Bloomington Career Academy (BCA)
