= White Oak Township, McLean County, Illinois =

Coordinates: 40°35′59″N 89°05′49″W

White Oak Township
- Township
- Location in McLean County

- McLean County's location in Illinois
- Country: United States
- State: Illinois
- County: McLean
- Established: November 3, 1857

Area
  - Total: 16.62 sq mi (43.0 km^{2})
  - Land: 16.61 sq mi (43.0 km^{2})
  - Water: 0.01 sq mi (0.026 km^{2}) 0.06%

Population (2010)
  - Estimate (2016): 899
  - Density: 54.1/sq mi (20.9/km^{2})
- Time zone: UTC-6 (CST)
  - Summer (DST): UTC-5 (CDT)
- FIPS code: 17-113-81321
- Website: whiteoaktownship.com

White Oak Township is located in McLean County, Illinois. As of the 2010 census, its population was 899 and it contained 355 housing units.

== Geography ==
According to the 2010 census, the township has a total area of 16.62 square miles (43.0 km^{2}), of which 16.61 square miles (43.0 km^{2}) (or 99.94%) is land and 0.01 square miles (0.026 km^{2}) (or 0.06%) is water.

== Demographics ==
Historical population
Census	Pop.	Note	%±
2016 (est.)	899
U.S. Decennial Census
