= Rail Splitter =

Rail splitter or railsplitter may refer to:

- A person who splits logs for building fences
- Nickname for Abraham Lincoln, U.S. President
  - Lincoln Memorial Railsplitters, the athletic program of Lincoln Memorial University, an NCAA Division II school in Harrogate, Tennessee named for President Lincoln
  - Rail Splitter Wind Farm, a 100-MW generating complex located in Illinois and named in honor of President Lincoln
- Edward R. Madigan State Fish and Wildlife Area, formerly known as Railsplitter State Park.
- 84th Division (United States), World War I and II unit nicknamed the "railsplitters"
- Voltage divider, an electric circuit. Typically with the intent to establish a virtual ground.
