= Springfield Southeast High School =

Location
- 2350 East Ash Street; Springfield, Illinois 62703; United States; 39°46′43″N 89°37′15″W

Information
- Type: Comprehensive public high school
- Established: 1967
- Status: Open
- School district: Springfield Public Schools District 186
- Superintendent: Jennifer Gill
- CEEB code: 143955
- Dean: Ladonna Lewis
- Principal: Cody Trigg
- Faculty: 75.83 (on FTE basis)
- Grades: 9 - 12
- Gender: Co-ed
- Student to teacher ratio: 19.27
- Campus type: Suburban
- Colors: blue white gold
- Athletics conference: Central State Eight
- Mascot: Spartan
- Team name: Spartans (Boys) / Lady Spartans (Girls)
- Newspaper: Eastside Chronicle
- Information: 217-525-3130
- Website: Official website

Springfield Southeast High School (SSHS or Southeast High School to natives) is a public high school located in Springfield, Illinois. It is the youngest high school serving Springfield Public Schools District 186, the oldest and second oldest being Springfield High School and Lanphier High School respectively. True to its name, this school feeds from the southeast area of Springfield.

As of the 2014-2015 school year, the school had an enrollment of 1,369 students and 90.05 classroom teachers (on a FTE basis), for a student-teacher ratio of 15.20:1. The school is well known for its athletics, particularly basketball.

The school was opened in 1967, replacing the smaller Feitshans High School which had operated since 1929. Some members of the community consider the two schools to be a single continuous entity. The new school was made possible by a US$3.2 million municipal bond issue. The original design of the building placed the gymnasium floor below ground level, but flooding in the 1970s and early 1980s damaged the gymnasium floor, and for several years the original hardwood floor was replaced by carpet.

A large fiberglass "Muffler Man" statue of a Spartan warrior stands above the front entrance of the school. The statue originally stood at a home builders business and was meant to portray a Viking but was later modified.

Within Springfield Southeast High School, there is a smaller specialty school called the Southeast Health & Science Academy, which specializes in teaching students who wish to pursue careers in medicine.
