= Normal Community West High School =

Normal West High School

Location
- 501 North Parkside Road; Normal, McLean County, Illinois 61761; United States; 40.52294°N 89.02298°W

Information
- School type: Public
- Opened: 1995; 31 years ago
- School district: McLean County Unit District No. 5
- Superintendent: Kristen Weikle
- Principal: Angie Codron
- Teaching staff: 106.03 (FTE)
- Grades: 9—12
- Gender: coed
- Enrolment: 1,659 (2023–2024)
- Student to teacher ratio: 15.65
- Hours in school day: 8
- Campus size: 400 acres (1.6 km^{2})
- Colours: black silver
- Slogan: It's a great day to be a Wildcat!
- Athletics: IHSA
- Athletics conference: Big Twelve
- Sports: Marching Band, Football, Golf, Soccer, Swimming & Diving, Tennis, Volleyball, Cross Country, Basketball, Poms, Wrestling, Baseball, Softball, Water Polo (club), Boxing (Club)
- Nickname: Wildcats
- Newspaper: The Paw Print
- Website: normalwest.unit5.org

Normal West High School is a public high school in Normal, Illinois. The mascot is the wildcat and school colors are black and silver. The school opened in 1995 and its current student body numbers roughly 1,600.

== Extracurricular activities ==
=== Sports ===
==== Soccer ====
In the school's short existence, the girls soccer team has won four Big Twelve Conference titles, along with two IHSA State Tournament qualifications, and a third place finish at the IHSA State Tournament in 2008, a second place finish at the IHSA State Tournament in 2014, and a fourth place finish at the IHSA tournament in 2018.

=== Marching Band ===
==== Normal West Marching Band (1995-2018) ====
The Normal West Marching Band was a highly decorated program in its 23-year existence. The band was directed by Lisa Preston (1995-2018) and Ryan Budzinski (2006-2018). The marching band, which won a Class 4A State Championship in 2008, has been awarded numerous other awards, including being the 2017 Sugar Bowl Parade and Field Show Grand Champion, winning the 2008 Greater St. Louis Silver Division Championship, being a three-time finalist at the Fiesta Bowl National Band Championships, being a Bands of America Regional Finalist and Regional Class Champion, and being a Bands of America Grand National Championship Semi-Finalist, among other awards.

==== The Normal Marching Band (2018-Present) ====
The Normal Marching Band is the combined marching bands of Normal Community West High School and Normal Community High School, which combined in 2018. The combined bands are co-directed by Ryan Budzinski and Paul Carter. Since its creation, the Normal Marching Band has been named the Class 6A Illinois State Marching Band Champions 3 times (2022, 2023, 2024), as well as the Governor's Grand Champion at the Illinois Marching Band Championships 2 times (2021, 2024). In 2025, the band was invited to be a performer in the 2025 London New Year's Day Parade. Previous directors include Lisa Preston (2018-2022), Lance Meadows (2018-2021), and George York.

== Demographics ==
According to the Illinois State Board of Education Report Card, 70.9% of the student population in 2021 was Caucasian, 12.5% was Black, 7.9% was non-white Hispanic, 2.6% was Asian, 0.4% was Indigenous, and 0.1% was Pacific Islander. The gender makeup of the school was 51.1% male and 48.9% female. Approximately 30.8% of students were low income, and 19.1% had a disability. The Report Card also reported that 0.4% of students were homeless.

== Notable alumni ==
- Adam Kinzinger (class of 1996), Republican U.S. Representative for Illinois's 11th congressional district.
- Cody White (class of 2007), Houston Texans NFL player
- Brock Stewart (class of 2010), Los Angeles Dodgers MLB player
