= Bloomington High School (Bloomington, Illinois) =

Location
- 1202 E. Locust Street; Bloomington, Illinois 61701; United States
- Coordinates: 40.4866°N 88.9741°W

Information
- Type: Public
- Status: Open
- School district: District 87
- NCES District ID: 1706480
- Superintendent: David Mouser
- NCES School ID: 170648000318
- Principal: Timothy Moore
- Teaching staff: 102.71 (on an FTE basis)
- Grades: 9–12
- Gender: coed
- Enrollment: 1,395 (2023-2024)
  - Grade 9: 398
  - Grade 10: 351
  - Grade 11: 317
  - Grade 12: 329
- Average class size: 13.5
- Student to teacher ratio: 13.58
- Hours in school day: 6.5
- Athletics: IHSA
- Athletics conference: Big Twelve
- Team name: Purple Raiders
- Newspaper: The Aegis
- Feeder schools: Bloomington Junior High
- Nobel laureates: Clinton Davisson

Bloomington High School (BHS) is a public secondary school in Bloomington, Illinois, and is part of Bloomington School District 87.

== Curriculum ==
Courses include subjects of standard core high school curricula (Math, English, Science, Physical Education, Foreign Language, etc.) as well as courses in fine arts, vocational skills and special education.

== Athletics ==
Athletics include a full range of individual and team sports, including football, basketball, baseball, softball, soccer, volleyball, tennis, swimming, diving, wrestling, track and field, cross country, golf, cheerleading, gaming club, and dance team. A wide variety of school clubs also meet on various topics.

The school's colors are purple and gold. The school dropped its mascot, a Native American chief head, in 2001 because it was deemed offensive. The school's students at that time voted not to replace the mascot but still called the Purple Raiders. Bloomington High School participates in the Big 12 Conference (Illinois).

== Awards ==
Bloomington High School was named by U.S. News & World Report as a Bronze Medal Winner in 2009 and a Silver Medal Winner in 2012. In 2024 it was ranked by U.S. News as #8,362 nationally and #297 within Illinois.

== Notable alumni ==
- Lynne Allsup, 1964 Tokyo Olympic swimmer in the preliminaries of the 4x100 freestyle relay.
- Bob Bender (1975) — basketball coach and player: Currently working as an assistant with the NBA's Atlanta Hawks.
- Zach Bradford, pole vaulter
- Tim Bradstreet (1985) — Comic book artist and illustrator
- Jim Cox (1968) — Former MLB player (Montreal Expos)
- Clinton Davisson, recipient of the 1937 Nobel Prize in Physics.
- Greg Engel, NFL player
- T. Markus Funk, law professor and attorney at Perkins Coie.
- Brandon Hughes (2003) — Philadelphia Eagles football player
- Gordon William Lillie a.k.a. Pawnee Bill, worked for Buffalo Bill's Wild West Show, then later operated his own wild west show
- A.C. Littleton (1908?) – Professor and accounting historian University of Illinois (now Gies College of Business), editor-in-chief The Accounting Review, Accounting Hall of Fame inductee
- Kenneth Raisbeck (1916), playwright and screenwriter
- Curt Raydon (1952?) — Former MLB player (Pittsburgh Pirates)
- John Ridgeway III, NFL player
- Edward B. Rust Jr. (1968) — CEO, State Farm
- Sidney Smith (1890s) Syndicated cartoonist
