= Lanphier High School =

Coordinates: 39.817771°N 89.639634°W

- 1300 North 11th Street; Springfield, Illinois 62702

Information
- Type: Public high school
- Established: 1937
- School district: Springfield School District 186
- Superintendent: Dr. Terrence Jordan
- Principal: Nick Pickett
- Teaching staff: 76.23 (on FTE basis)
- Grades: 9 - 12
- Enrollment: 1,084 (2023-2024)
- Student to teacher ratio: 14.22
- Color
- Athletics conference: Central State Eight
- Sports: Baseball, Basketball, Cross Country, Football, Golf, Soccer, Softball, Tennis, Track, Volleyball, Wrestling
- Mascot: Lion (Leo)
- Team name: Lions (Boys) / Lady Lions (Girls)
- Newspaper: The Lanphier Roar
- Yearbook: The Lan-Hi
- Information: 217-525-3080

Lanphier High School, in the capital of the U.S. state of Illinois, Springfield, is a public high school owned and operated by Springfield Public School District 186. It is also the home of the John Marshall Club, a club with open membership dedicated to uniting the community and spreading the knowledge of former supreme court justice, John Marshall.

== History ==
Originally, the land that the high school was built on was owned by the Lanphier family. Originally the land was a park called Reservoir Park, in which many people would go during the summer. After the park was sold to the school district, the actual building of the school became a part of the Works Progress Administration (WPA).

The first graduating class of the high school was in 1937.

The biggest expansion of the school was the absorption of Edison Middle School. There was originally a walkway that connected the two schools. During the 1960s, the two buildings were combined to make the high school much larger. Some of the most recent modifications are the Commons Area, additional classrooms on the West end of the school, and most recently the renovation of the entire school.

== Notable alumni ==
- Rome Flynn - actor in How to Get Away with Murder
- Kevin Gamble - NBA player for Boston Celtics
- Ed Horton - NBA player for the Washington Bullets
- Tim Hulett - MLB player for Chicago White Sox and Baltimore Orioles
- Andre Iguodala - NBA player, 4X NBA champion for Golden State Warriors and 2015 NBA Finals MVP
- Mike McKenna - NHL goaltender, drafted by Nashville Predators in sixth round of 2002 NHL entry draft; made NHL debut in 2009 with Tampa Bay Lightning
- Robin Roberts - pitcher for the Philadelphia Phillies, 7x All-Star and 4x MLB wins leader; member of Baseball Hall of Fame
- Russ Smith - producer of award-winning film Juno
