= Salt Fork Vermilion River =

River in Illinois, United States

Salt Fork
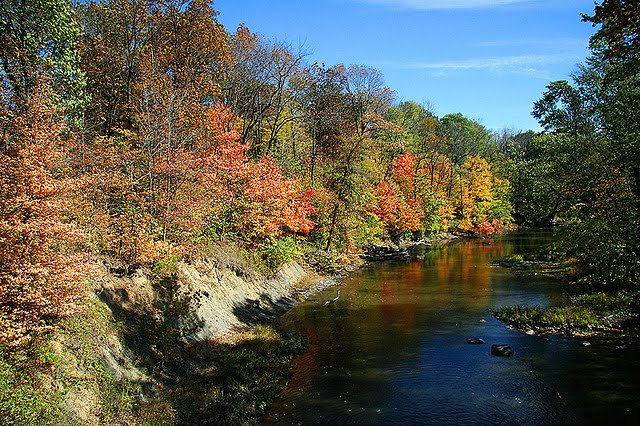
- The Salt Fork near Ogden

Physical characteristics
- Source
  - location: Confluence of the Upper Salt Fork drainage ditch and the Spoon River east of Champaign, Illinois
  - coordinates: 40°09′09″N 88°01′54″W
- Mouth
  - location: Confluence of the Salt Fork and the Middle Fork forming the Vermilion River west of Danville, Illinois
  - coordinates: 40°06′13″N 87°43′01″W
  - elevation: 531 ft (162 m)
- Length: 68 mi (109 km)

Basin features
- Progression: Salt Fork → Vermilion → Wabash → Ohio → Mississippi → Gulf of Mexico
- Tributaries
  - left: Spoon River
  - right: Saline Branch
- GNIS ID: 417900

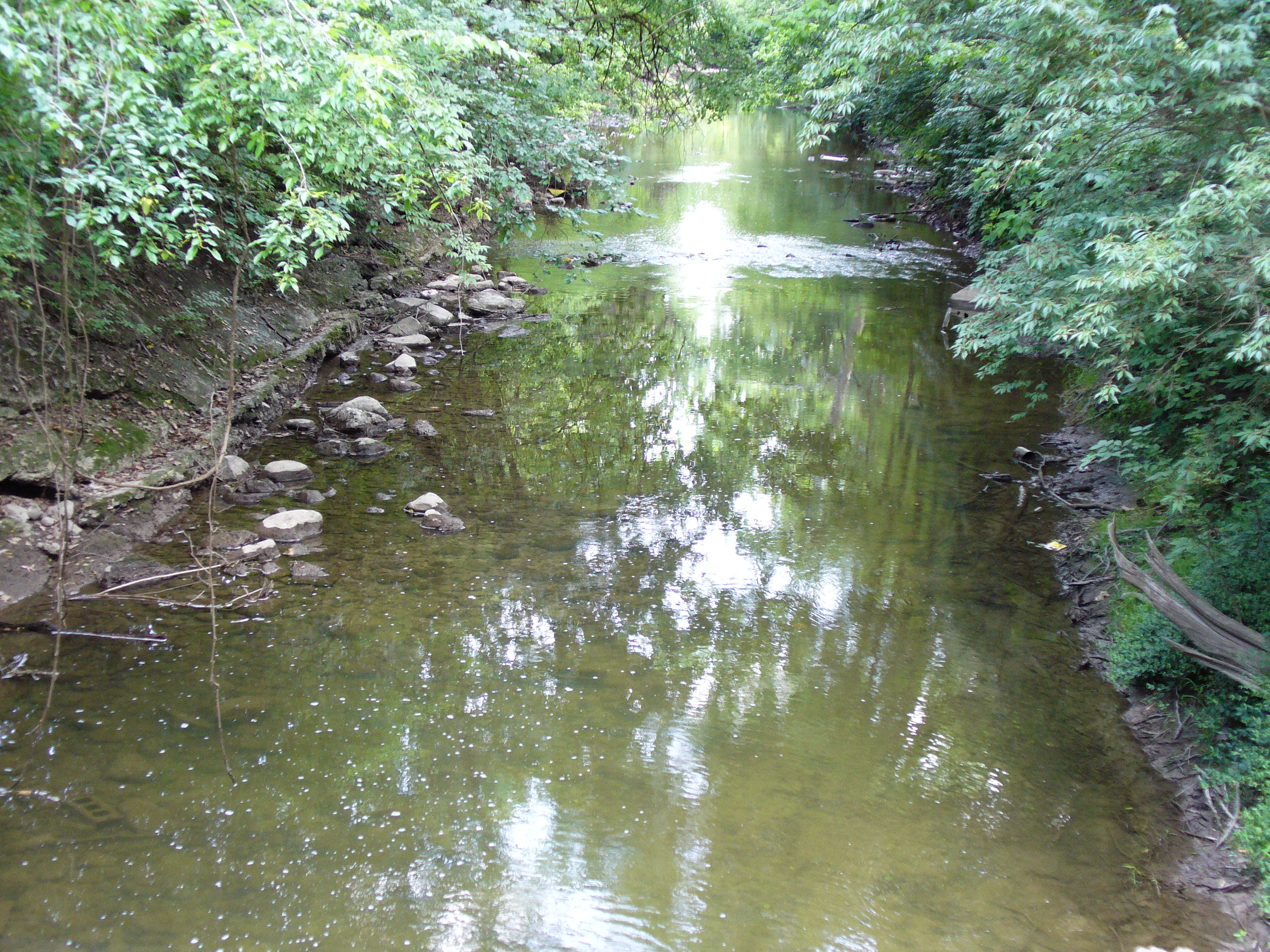
Saline Branch of the Salt Fork in Crystal Lake Park in Urbana

The Salt Fork is a tributary of the Vermilion River located in the Central Corn Belt Plains of Illinois.

The Salt Fork owes its name to saline springs that provided natural salt licks for animals, and which were used for production of salt by Native Americans and early settlers. The springs were located about eight miles west of Danville, to the south of Muncie, Illinois. The upper reaches of the Salt Fork do not contain saline springs.

In its natural state, the Salt Fork drained a vast upland marsh between Urbana and Rantoul. The Salt Fork has been extended into these marshes by drainage ditches. Including the ditches, the Salt Fork is about 70 miles (110 km) long.

== Parks and access points ==
- Crystal Lake Park, Urbana Park District
- Homer Lake Park, Champaign County Forest Preserve District

== Cities and towns ==
The following cities, towns and villages are in the Salt Fork watershed:

- Champaign
- Homer
- Rantoul
- Sidney
- St. Joseph
- Thomasboro
- Urbana
- Oakwood

== Counties ==
The following counties are in the Salt Fork watershed:

- Champaign County, Illinois
- Vermilion County, Illinois
