= Middle Fork Vermilion River =

River in Illinois, United States

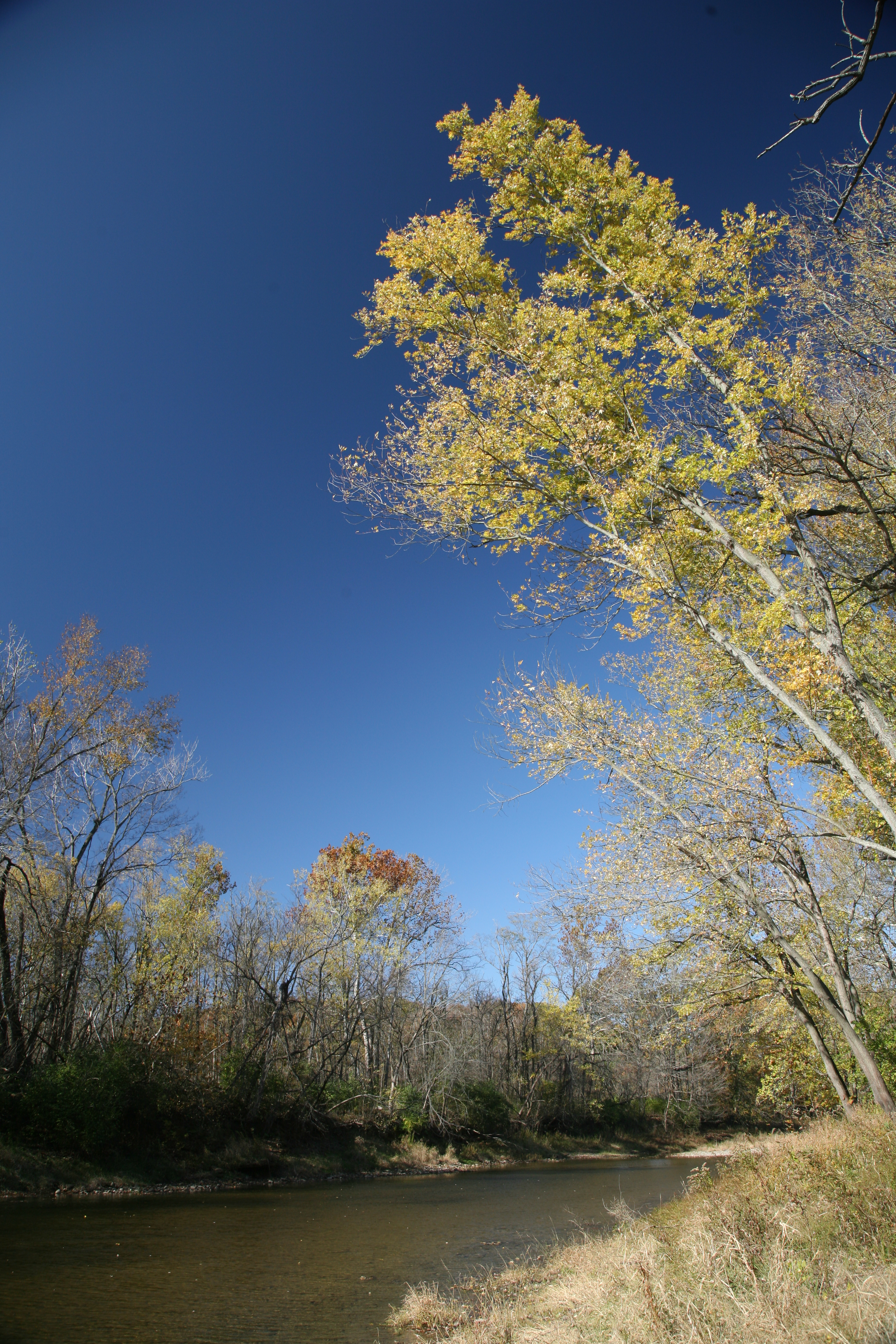

Physical characteristics
- Source
  - location: Confluence of a drainage ditch and Prairie Creek in Ford County southeast of Paxton, Illinois
  - coordinates: 40°24′15″N 88°01′05″W
- Mouth
  - location: Confluence with the Salt Fork forming the Vermilion River west of Danville, Illinois
  - coordinates: 40°06′13″N 87°43′02″W
  - elevation: 535 ft (163 m)
- Length: 77 mi (124 km)
- Discharge
  - location: Oakwood, Illinois
  - average: 416 cu/ft. per sec.

Basin features
- Progression: Middle Fork → Vermilion → Wabash → Ohio → Mississippi → Gulf of Mexico
- GNIS ID: 413502

National Wild and Scenic River
- Type: Scenic
- Designated: May 11, 1989

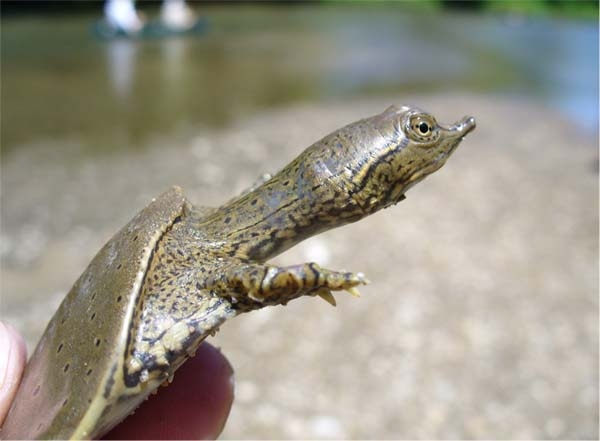
Baby softshell surveys a bar on the Middle Fork.

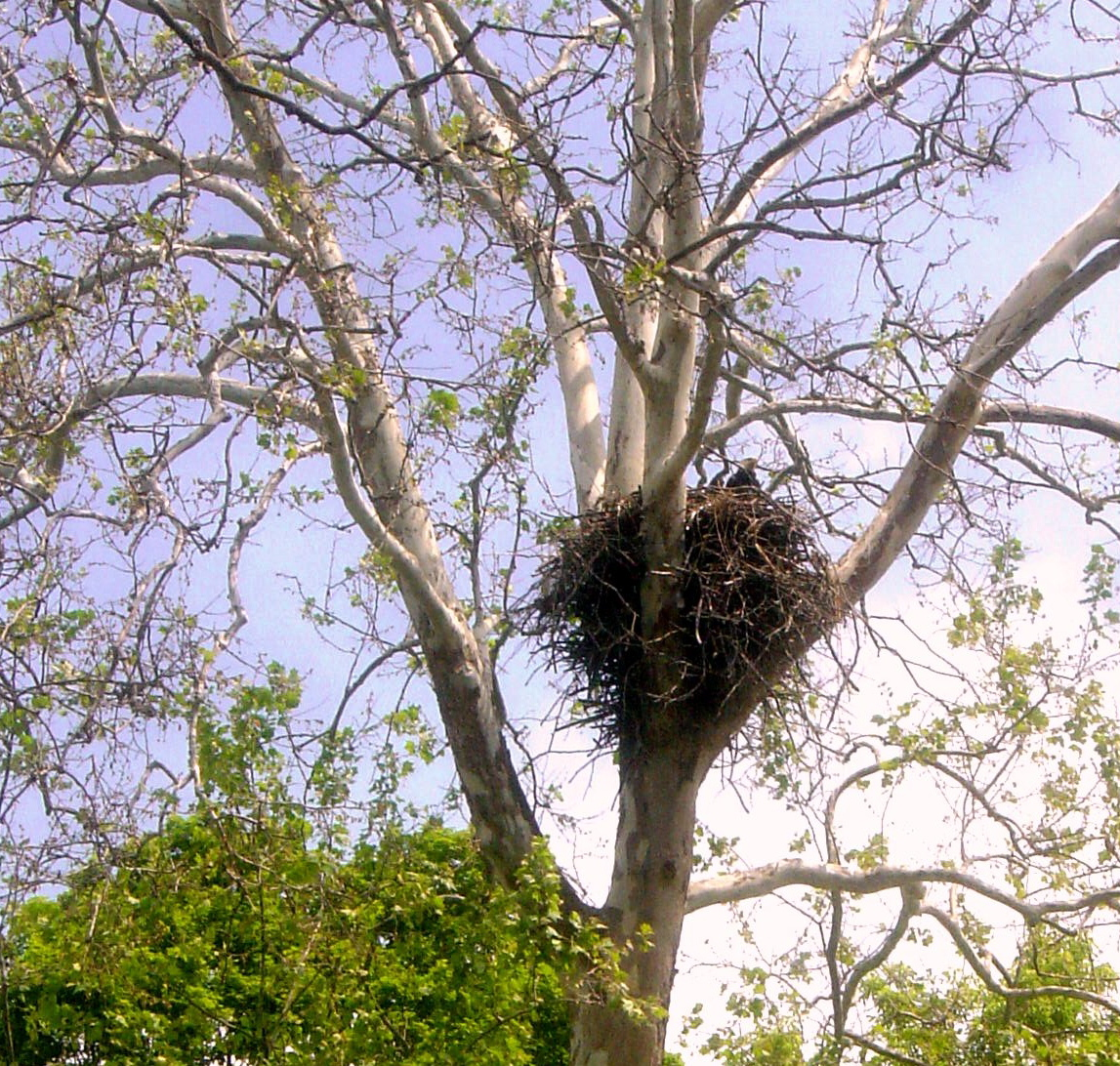
Bald eagle on nest, spring 2011

The Middle Fork of the Vermilion River is a tributary of the Vermilion River (Wabash River) in Illinois. The Middle Fork rises in Ford County and flows southeast to join the Vermilion near Danville.

In its natural state, the Middle Fork drained a large upland marsh in what is now Ford County. The Middle Fork has been extended into the marsh by drainage ditches. Including the ditches, the Middle Fork is about 77 miles (124 km) long.

== Parks and access points ==
The Middle Fork is Illinois' only designated National Wild and Scenic River. Parks and access points include:

- Kickapoo State Recreation Area
- Middle Fork State Fish and Wildlife Area
- Kennekuk Cove County Park, Vermillion County Conservation District
- Middle Fork River Forest Preserve, Champaign County Forest Preserve District

== Cities, towns and counties ==
The following cities, towns and villages are among those in the watershed of the Middle Fork:

- Melvin, Illinois
- Paxton, Illinois
- Potomac, Illinois

Parts of the following counties are drained by the Middle Fork:

- Champaign County, Illinois
- Ford County, Illinois
- Vermilion County, Illinois

== See also ==
- List of Illinois rivers
