= Forest Glen Preserve =

- Location within Illinois
- Location: Vermilion County, Illinois, USA
- Nearest city: Westville, Illinois
- Coordinates: 40°00′31.86″N 87°33′18.14″W
- Area: 1,800 acres (7.28 km^{2})
- Established: 1968
- Governing body: Vermilion County Conservation District

Forest Glen Preserve is a 1,800-acre (7.3 km^{2}) nature reserve in McKendree Township in Vermilion County, Illinois. It is located about 4 miles (6.4 km) east of Illinois State Route 1 between the towns of Westville and Georgetown. It was founded in 1968 and serves as the headquarters for the Illinois Native Plant Society.

== River Ridge Backpack Trail ==
The preserve contains an 11-mile backpacking trail, known as River Ridge. The trail begins at the main office, and loops around the entire preserve. The trail crosses many streams and winds up and down a series of hills. The trail is marked by red bands and arrows on trees. The east campsite, which has 5 sites, is a popular place to set up camp while hiking the trail. The trail also passes the group campsite, which is a large space for groups to camp.

== Camping ==
Forest Glen has numerous campsites of varying sizes and facilities. There are 50 first class campsites with running water, shower facilities, a camp store, and dumping stations. Most of those campsites have electricity. There are also 16 completely wooded and hike-in only campsites. These campsites have picnic tables, fire rings, and water available. The showers are also within walking distance of these sites. For groups, there are six large group campsites that have water available, and picnic tables. These sites require prior registration and are for organized groups. For hikers on the backpack trail, the East Camp is located at the 7.5 mile mark. The East Camp has picnic tables, fire rings, and pit toilets. Running water is not available there.

== Fishing and Picnicking ==
Forest Glen has many places to fish. The Vermillion River is a very popular place to fish. Fishing is also allowed in the Willow Creek Pond, Edgewood Pond, Entrance Pond, and Highland Pond. Picnicking is also popular at Forest Glen, and there are several picnic areas with tables and grills. Some of them have fire pits and many of them are accessible by car.

== Wildlife and Plants ==
Forest glen is home to many animals. Such animals include deer, turkey, coyotes, woodpeckers, fox, and geese. It is also a favorite spot of bird watchers. The park is also home to many diverse plants and trees describe by Illinois Native Plant Society. Forest Glen contains a 72 foot tall tower climbed by many visitors each year. From the tower, you can see the Vermillion River and you can see the tops of many different trees and plants throughout the park.
