= Saline Branch =

Saline Branch Drainage Ditch

Physical characteristics
- Source
  - location: Champaign County, Illinois south of Rantoul, Illinois
  - coordinates: 40°15′59″N 88°10′28″W
- Mouth
  - location: Confluence with the Salt Fork Vermilion River west of St. Joseph, Illinois
  - coordinates: 40°07′02″N 88°03′08″W
  - elevation: 676 ft (206 m)

Basin features
- Progression: Saline Branch → Salt Fork → Vermilion → Wabash → Ohio → Mississippi → Gulf of Mexico
- Tributaries
  - right: Boneyard Creek
- GNIS ID: 417889

The Saline Branch, or Saline Branch Ditch, is a tributary of the Vermilion River in east central Illinois. It drains a parcel of east-central Champaign County, including most of the city of Urbana, Illinois and the University of Illinois campus within Urbana.

Extensive engineering work from the late 1800s through the early 1900s, completed in 1908, straightened and ditched the once-wandering creek. It discharges into the Salt Fork of the Vermilion River; the discharge includes outflow from the Urbana-Champaign Sanitary District. The U.S. Geographic Names Information System (GNIS) states an alternate name for this stream is West Branch Salt Fork.
