= Jamesburg =

Jamesburg may refer to:

- Jamesburg, California
- Jamesburg, Illinois
- Jamesburg, New Jersey
