= Middle Fork State Fish and Wildlife Area =

State park in Illinois, USA

- IUCN category V (protected landscape/seascape)
- Location within Illinois Location within the United States
- Location: Vermilion County, Illinois, USA
- Nearest city: Oakwood, Illinois
- Coordinates: 40°15′34″N 87°47′38″W
- Area: 2,700 acres (1,100 ha)
- Established: 1986
- Governing body: Illinois Department of Natural Resources

Middle Fork State Fish and Wildlife Area is an Illinois state park on 2,700 acres (1,100 ha) in Vermilion County, Illinois, United States. It is located about 6 miles (9.7 km) north of Interstate 74 and the Oakwood exit. Its name comes from the Middle Fork of the Vermilion River that flows through the area.
