= Heron County Park =

Park in Illinois, US

- Location within Illinois
- Location: Vermilion County, Illinois, US
- Nearest city: Danville, Illinois
- Coordinates: 40°12′25.1706″N 87°39′3.8586″W
- Established: 2004
- Governing body: Vermilion County Conservation District

Heron County Park is a park in Newell Township in Vermilion County, Illinois. It is located just north of Danville, Illinois on Newell Road, at the north end of Lake Vermilion where the lake's waters are very shallow. A 950-foot-long floating boardwalk and watchtower which allows visitors to walk through a portion of the wetland. The wetlands were donated by Aqua Illinois Inc.

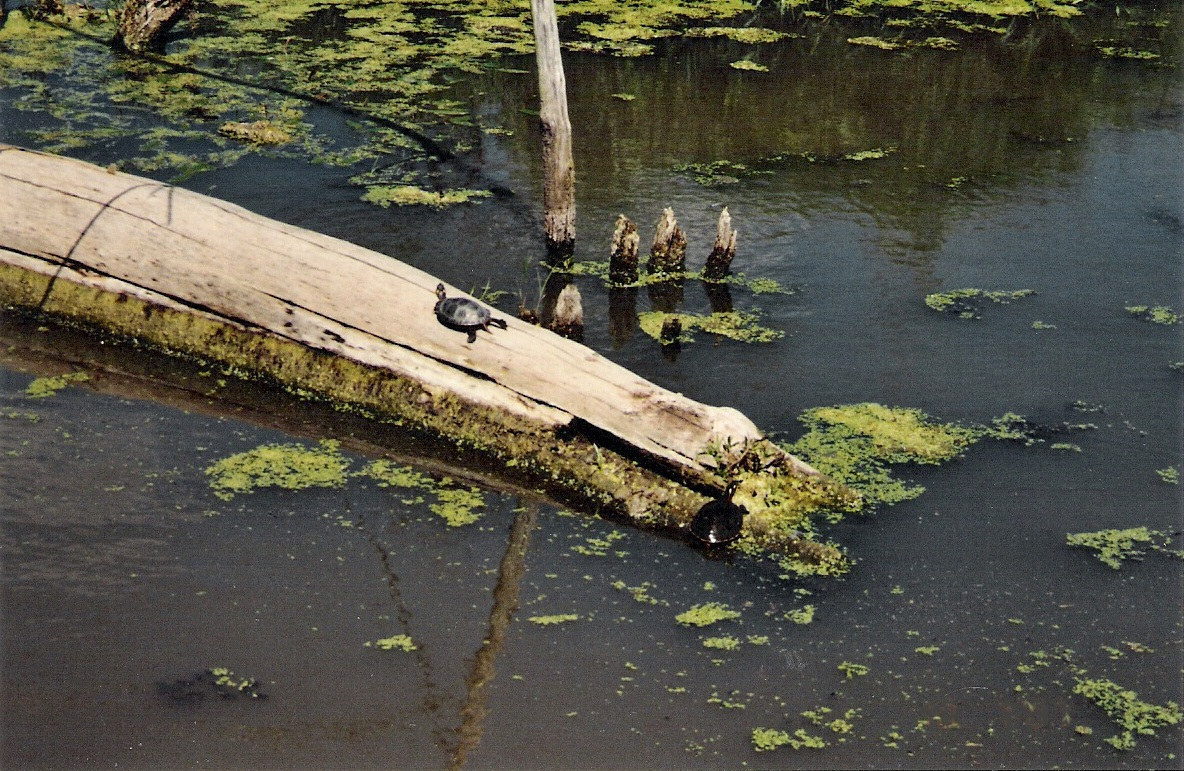
Turtles in the Wetland of the Heron County Park

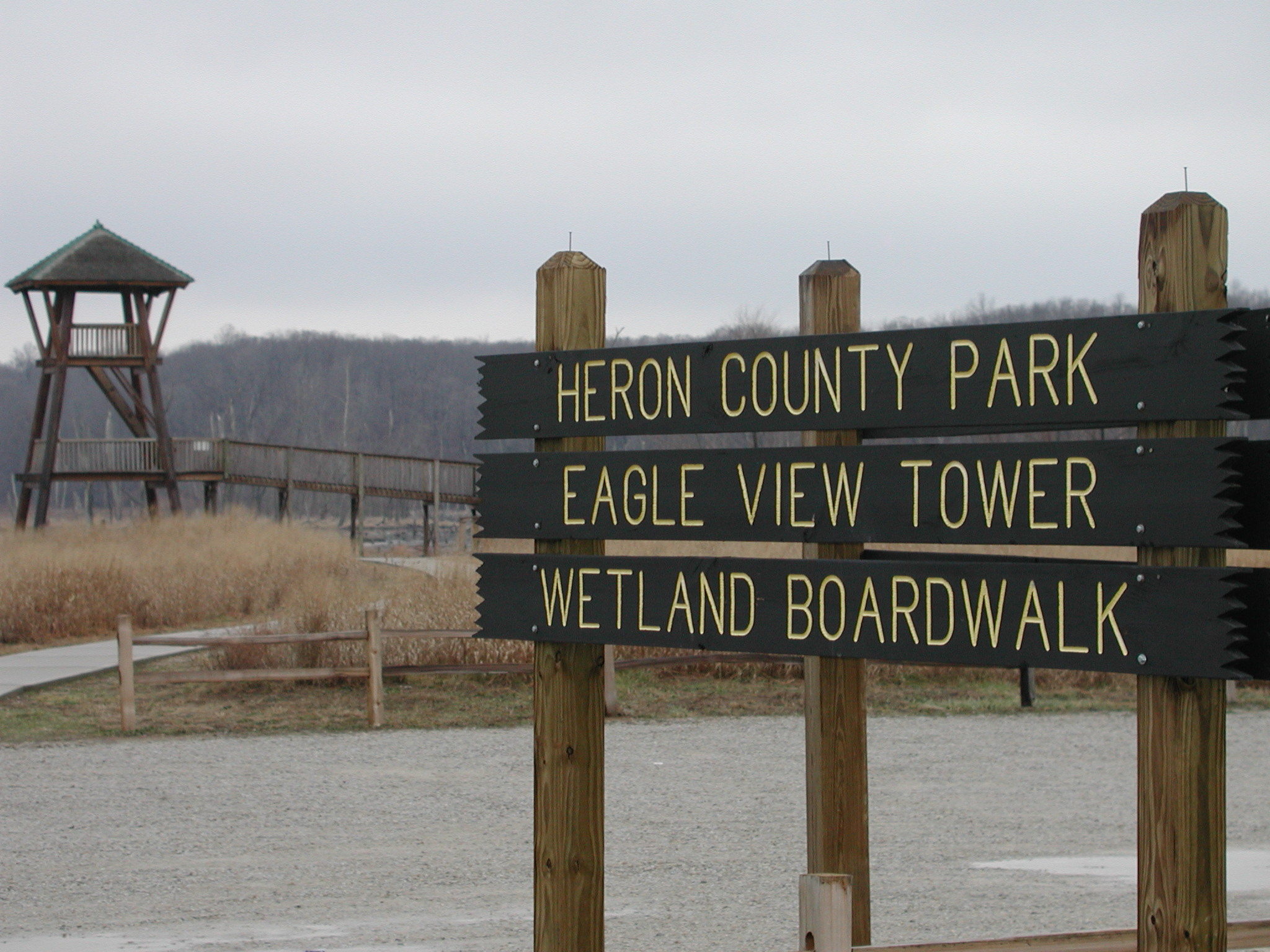
Entrance Sign
