= Hugh M. Luckey =

American politician (1873–1946)

Hugh Magill Luckey (November 2, 1873 – December 29, 1946) was an American farmer and politician.

Luckey was born on a farm near Potomac, Illinois. He went to Potomac public schools and graduated from the Potomac High School. Luckey was a farmer. He served on the Vermilion County Board of Supervisors and was chairman of the county board. Luckey was a Republican. He served in the Illinois House of Representatives from 1923 to 1931; from 1935 to 1937; and from 1941 to 1943. Luckey then served in the Illinois Senate from 1943, until his death in 1946. Luckey died at Lakeview Hospital, in Danville, Illinois, after being ill for three weeks.
