= DNV (disambiguation) =

DNV may refer to:

- DNV, an international accredited registrar and classification society for maritime shipping
- Vermilion Regional Airport (IATA airport code: DNV), Danville, Illinois, U.S.
- Intha-Danu language (ISO 639 language code: dnv)
- Richard "DNV" Sohl (1953–1990), American musician
- District of North Vancouver, a municipality in Metro Vancouver in British Columbia, Canada
