= Kennekuk Cove County Park =

Park in Blount Township, Illinois, USA

- Location within Illinois
- Location: Vermilion County, Illinois, USA
- Nearest city: Danville, Illinois
- Coordinates: 40°12′30.63″N 87°43′23.56″W
- Area: 3,000 acres (12.14 km^{2})
- Established: 1974
- Governing body: Vermilion County Conservation District

Kennekuk Cove County Park is a 3,000-acre (12 km^{2}) park in Blount Township in Vermilion County, Illinois, United States. It is located about 5 miles (8.0 km) west of Danville, Illinois and is bordered by the Middle Fork State Fish and Wildlife Area on the west and the Kickapoo State Recreation Area on the south. It includes a 170-acre (0.69 km^{2}) lake called Lake Mingo.

There are two cemeteries within the park: Dodson Cemetery and the Lorrence Pioneer Cemetery.

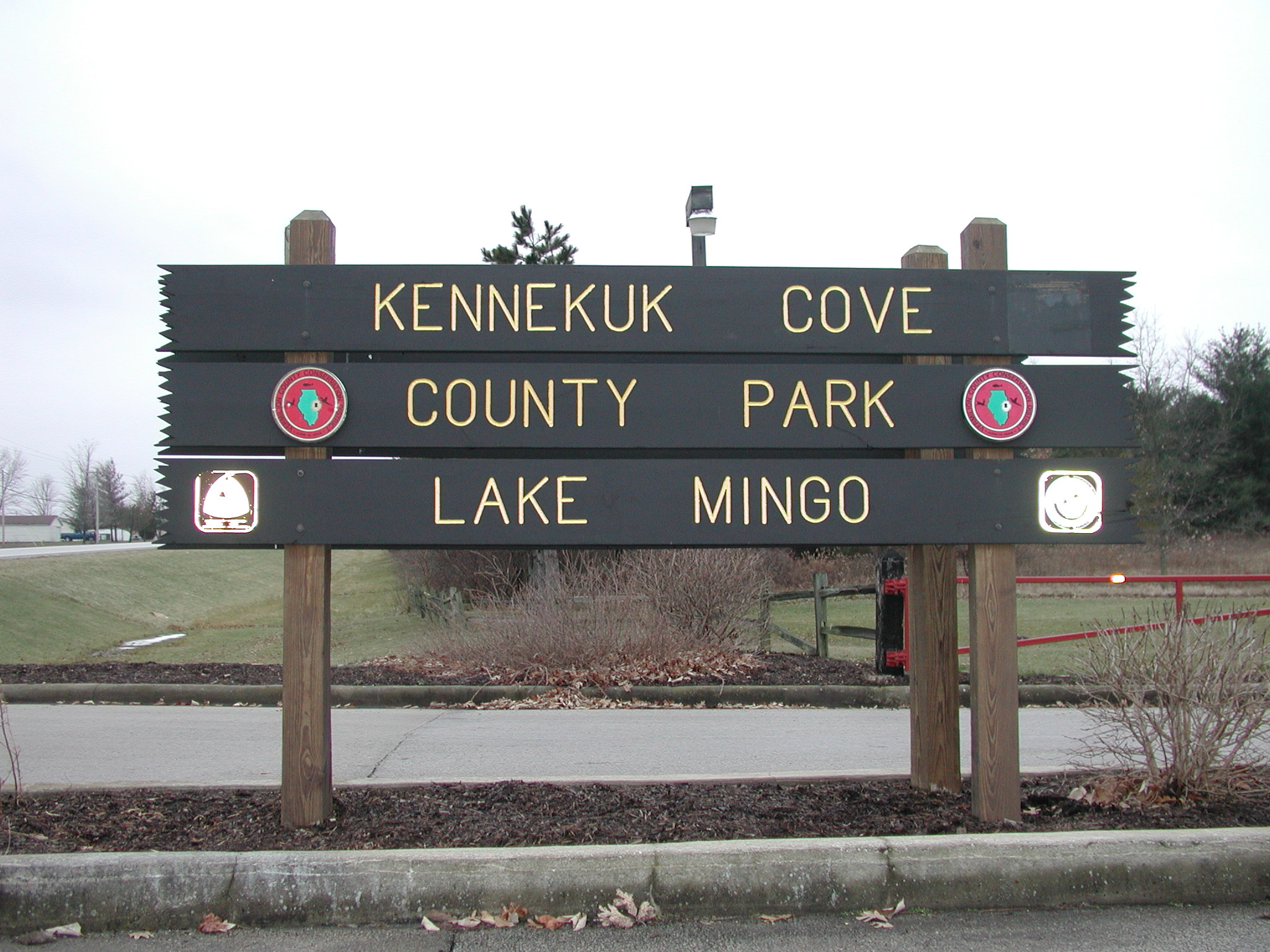
Entrance Sign
