= Midway, Vermilion County, Illinois =

Midway, Illinois
- Unincorporated community
- Location within Illinois Location within the United States
- Coordinates: 40°00′58″N 87°38′16″W
- Country: United States
- State: Illinois
- County: Vermilion
- Township: Georgetown
- Elevation: 679 ft (207 m)
- Time zone: UTC-6 (Central (CST))
  - Summer (DST): UTC-5 (CDT)
- Area code: 217
- GNIS feature ID: 413520

Midway is an unincorporated community in Georgetown Township, Vermilion County, Illinois, United States. Midway is located on Illinois Route 1, 1.8 miles (2.9 km) south of Westville.
