= Vermilion County, Illinois bombings =

1997–98 American bombings

Vermilion County bombings
- Location: Danville, Oakwood
- Date: 30 December 1997; 24 May 1998; 30 May 1998
- Target: United Methodist Church; First Assembly of God Church
- Attack type: Bombing, suicide bombing
- Weapon: Pipe bombs
- Deaths: 2 (including the perpetrator)
- Injuries: 34
- Perpetrator: Richard Dean White
- Motive: Personal grievances (suspected)

The Vermilion County bombings were a series of three bombings in the Illinois towns of Danville and Oakwood in 1997 and 1998 that killed two people and injured 34. The bombings were committed by Richard Dean White, an Army veteran and member of the Danville church he targeted in the second bombing.

== First bombing ==
On December 30, 1997, White placed a pipe bomb triggered by a motion sensor inside a cooler outside United Methodist Church in Oakwood, Illinois. 46-year old Brian Plawer left the church and noticed the cooler. While attempting to move it the motion sensor activated, causing the pipe bomb to detonate. He was killed instantly. The bombing was heard throughout the town and caused minor damage to the church.

== Second bombing ==
On May 24, 1998, White went to the west side of the First Assembly of God Church in Danville, Illinois, where he placed a pipe bomb on top of an air conditioning and heating unit next to an exterior support pillar. In the church, over 300 people were attending services when the bomb detonated near the youth section. The explosion blew a 10 foot by 15-foot hole in the side of the church. Because the bomb was placed on the air conditioning unit and the way the bomb was built most of the fragments from the bomb flew over the congregation. No one was killed in the bombing however 34 people were injured.

== Investigation ==
After the first bombing both the federal Bureau of Alcohol, Tobacco, Firearms and Explosives (ATF) and the Federal Bureau of Investigation (FBI) got involved but were unable to find anything linking the bombing to an individual. After the second bombing, the ATF and FBI found that both bombs had a blue-insulated, silver-coated, single-strand wire in common. While the forensics teams were investigating the bomb's components, investigators were asking witnesses and members of the church about info that could lead to an arrest. Eventually, they came upon White as a person of interest as he was a member of the church but not a suspect.

== Third bombing ==
On May 30, 1998, the ATF went to interview White at his property but he wasn't there. A family member that was living at the premises said he was living with his mother and called ahead. Before the ATF could reach his house, White went into a garage on his property with his German shepherd dog. At 4:44 PM he detonated a pipe bomb on himself, killing both himself and his dog instantly and damaging the garage. When the FBI went into the garage they found an unexploded bomb and the corpse of White with his dog.

== Motive ==
There are several possible motives as to why White committed the bombings. White had mental problems and spent time in the mental wards of multiple veterans’ hospitals over the course of several years. Another possible reason or motive stems from his younger brother Randy Shotts who was injured in a swimming accident in 1986 that left him paralyzed. Multiple of the doctors who treated Shotts attended the two churches, and White is said to have had resentment at the way the doctors treated his brother.

== In popular culture ==
On August 14, 2009, the Forensic Files TV show aired an episode titled "Holy Terror" which overviewed the bombings. They were also the subject of the "Holy Terror in the Heartland" episode of the A&E City Confidential series (season 9, episode 11, first broadcast on August 8, 2025).
