= Unionville, Vermilion County, Illinois =

Unionville, Illinois
- Unincorporated community
- Location within Illinois Location within the United States
- Coordinates: 40°01′30″N 87°38′17″W
- Country: United States
- State: Illinois
- County: Vermilion
- Township: Georgetown
- Elevation: 676 ft (206 m)
- Time zone: UTC-6 (Central (CST))
  - Summer (DST): UTC-5 (CDT)
- Area code: 217
- GNIS feature ID: 420147

Unionville is an unincorporated community in Georgetown Township, Vermilion County, Illinois, United States. Unionville is located on U.S. Route 150 and Illinois Route 1 along the southern border of Westville.
