= McKendree Township, Vermilion County, Illinois =

McKendree Township
- Township
- Location in Vermilion County
- Coordinates: 40°00′12″N 87°34′37″W
- Country: United States
- State: Illinois
- County: Vermilion
- Created: 1912

Area
  - Total: 29.37 sq mi (76.1 km^{2})
  - Land: 29.25 sq mi (75.8 km^{2})
  - Water: 0.12 sq mi (0.31 km^{2}) 0.41%
- Elevation: 673 ft (205 m)

Population (2010)
  - Estimate (2016): 773
  - Density: 27.6/sq mi (10.7/km^{2})
- Time zone: UTC-6 (CST)
  - Summer (DST): UTC-5 (CDT)
- FIPS code: 17-183-45772

McKendree Township is a township in Vermilion County, Illinois, USA. As of the 2010 census, its population was 807 and it contained 344 housing units. Forest Glen Preserve is located in this township.

== History ==
This area was originally part of Georgetown Township, but growing dissatisfaction with a lack of development in that portion of the township, compared with the Georgetown and Westville areas, led to a petition for creation of a new township in 1912. The name came from McKendree Methodist Church.

== Geography ==
According to the 2010 census, the township has a total area of 29.37 square miles (76.1 km^{2}), of which 29.25 square miles (75.8 km^{2}) (or 99.59%) is land and 0.12 square miles (0.31 km^{2}) (or 0.41%) is water. The stream of White Branch runs through this township.

=== Extinct towns ===
- Meeks

=== Adjacent townships ===
- Danville Township (north)
- Highland Township, Vermillion County, Indiana (northeast)
- Eugene Township, Vermillion County, Indiana (southeast)
- Love Township (south)
- Georgetown Township (west)

=== Cemeteries ===
The township contains eight cemeteries: Bock, Elwood Church, Locket, Lorance, McKendree, Michael, Niccum and North Fork.

== Demographics ==
Historical population
Census	Pop.	Note	%±
2016 (est.)	773
U.S. Decennial Census
