= Kickapoo State Recreation Area =

State park in Illinois, United States

- IUCN category V (protected landscape/seascape)
- Location within Illinois Location within the United States
- Location: Vermilion County, Illinois, USA
- Nearest city: Oakwood, Illinois
- Coordinates: 40°07′00″N 87°44′09″W
- Area: 2,842 acres (1,150 ha)
- Established: 1939
- Governing body: Illinois Department of Natural Resources

Kickapoo State Recreation Area is an Illinois state park on 2,842 acres (1,150 ha) in Vermilion County, Illinois, United States. Located between Oakwood, Illinois and Danville, Illinois, this park is easily accessible through route I-74. It is 28 miles (45 km) away from the University of Illinois at Urbana-Champaign and 95 miles (153 km) from Indianapolis. According to the Illinois Department of Natural Resources, the name Kickapoo originated from the Kickapoo village that once existed near the junction of the Salt Fork and Middle Fork branches of the Vermilion River. After Europeans settled in the area and displaced the Native Americans, the Europeans began to dig wells to harvest salt from salt springs, called salines. In the early 20th century the land was then strip-mined for coal. Kickapoo State Park was the first park in the United States to be located on strip-mined land. The state of Illinois purchased the Kickapoo State Park Area in 1939 with donation money from Danville residents and the land has since recovered from the extraction of these resources.

Today, Kickapoo State Park has 221 acres (89 ha) of ponds and lakes with nearly 35 miles (56 km) of hiking trails for many types of recreational activities including camping, canoeing, hunting, mountain biking, and fishing. In the winter season, ice fishing and cross-country skiing are popular pastimes for visitors to the park. Campsites are available year-round with RV and electric hookups available. There are 22 deep water ponds which are accessible to electric motor boats, canoes, and kayaks. Visitors to the park may rent a canoe or kayak to paddle down the Vermilion River, which runs through the center Kickapoo State Park. Scuba diving is also allowed within the park.

== History ==
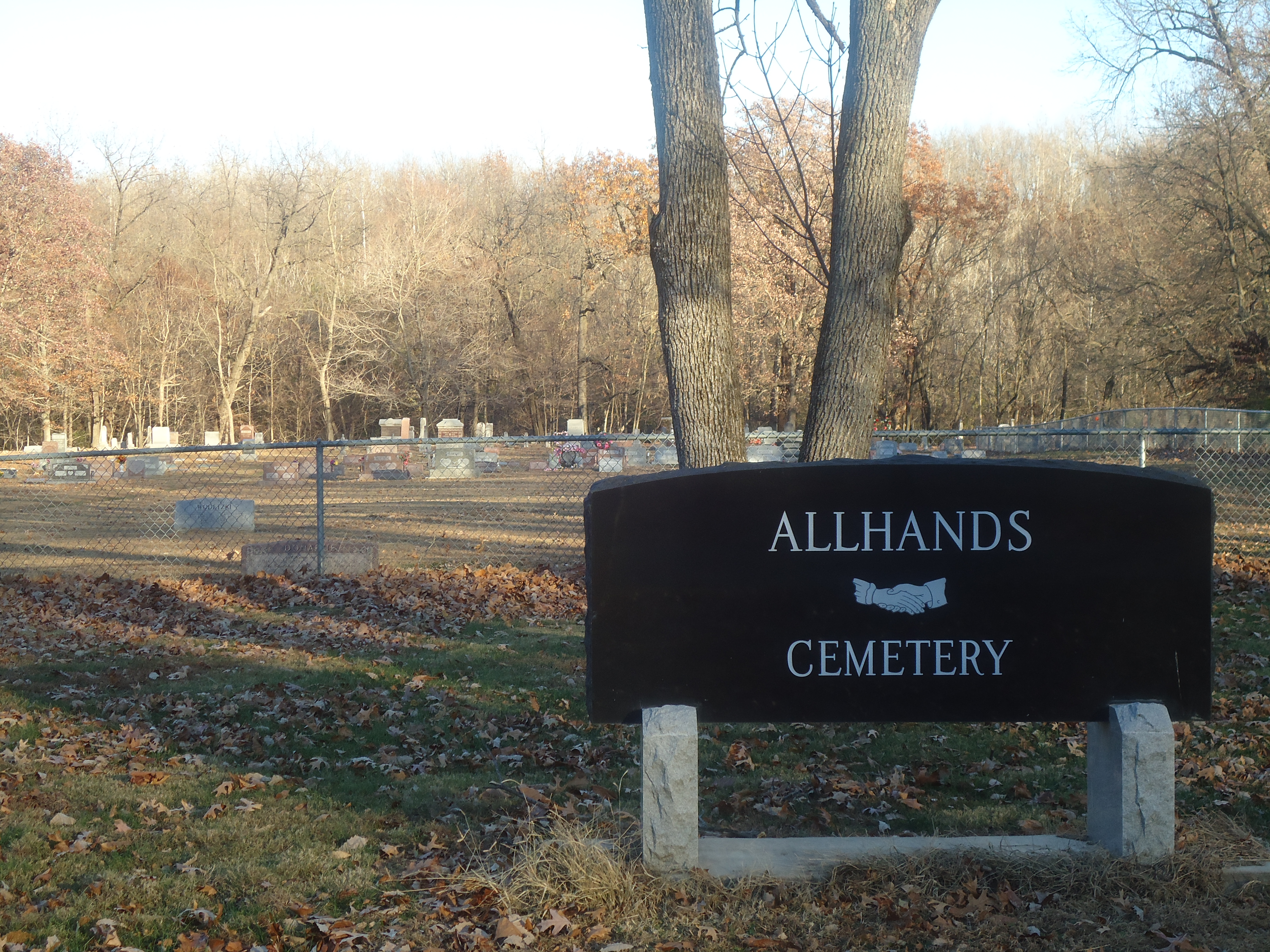
Allhands Cemetery, located in the southeast corner of Kickapoo State Park, is the final resting place for many early European settlers from the early 20th century.

=== Native American history: 500-1500 ===
According to the Illinois Department of Natural Resources, archaeological evidence indicates the existence of a village inhabited by Native Americans of the Woodland and Mississippian cultures somewhere between 500 and 1500. This village was located at the junction of the Middle Fork and Salt Fork Rivers. The village was home to Kennekuk, a Native American known as the "Kickapoo Prophet", who brokered many treaties between the European settlers and Native Americans. Kennekuk was a proponent of a new form of Christianity that had elements of Roman Catholicism and Protestantism. The Native Americans lived in the area which is now Kickapoo State Park until sometime during the 16th century.

=== Salt production: 1819-1848 ===
Europeans were drawn to what is now the Kickapoo State Recreation Area with the discovery of salt springs in 1819. Most of the immigrants to this area were English. After the Europeans settled in the area, they began to dig wells all over the land. From these wells they harvested salt brine and boiled it down to produce salt. This salt operation continued until 1848, producing as much as 120 bushels of salt per week during the peak of its production process. One of the iron rendering kettles used in the production process can be seen at the Salt Kettle Rest area on I-74. Many European settlers from the early 20th century are buried in Allhands Cemetery, which is located in the eastern section of the park. Other settlers such as John Cox, an Indian fighter and scout in the Black Hawk War, and his wife are buried at the entrance to Fox Campground in a small pioneer cemetery.

=== Coal strip-mining: 1850-1940 ===
Between 1850 and 1940 the park area was strip-mined for coal, leaving many mine pits and spoil piles. The mine in Kickapoo State Park was one of the first in the country to use mechanization for strip-mining. Over the years these mine pits have filled with water and become lakes and barren areas have been largely reforested.

=== State ownership: 1940-present ===
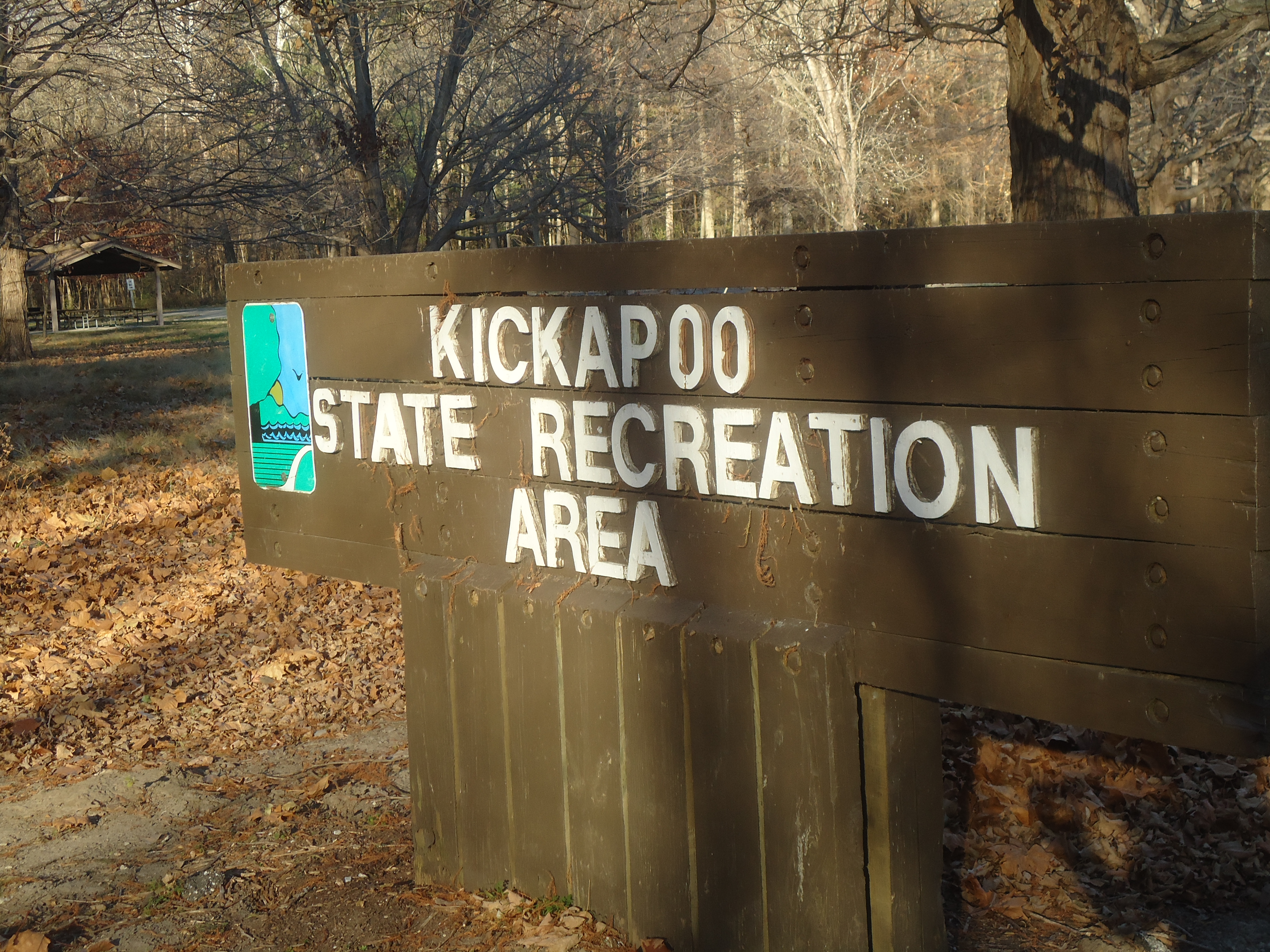
Entrance sign to Kickapoo State Recreation Area

The state of Illinois initially purchased 1,290 acres of land from the United Electric Coal Company in 1939 and added additional areas to the park in subsequent years. Clint C. Tilton, a local newspaper owner and historian, began the drive that brought this park to Vermilion County. Since then the park has gradually recovered from the mine pits and spoil piles left behind from the strip-mining process.

In the fall of 2008, a shortage in the state budget of $2 billion led to the threat of park closure. The state was planning to close 11 parks on November 1, including Kickapoo State Park, to help meet its budget. Kelley Quinn, a spokeswoman from former Governor Rod Blagojevich's office, said "[p]arks are closing across the country; people are being laid off...[you] have to consider the national economy. The national economy is part of...[why we must close the park]." The decision to close the park was met with much resistance. More than 300 protesters, made up of a conglomeration of local Danville residents and University of Illinois students, met at Kickapoo in late August 2008 to protest its closure. Due to the protests, Illinois Governor Rod Blagojevich decided to allow Kickapoo to remain open while 7 other state parks were closed. In celebration of the park remaining open, a cleanup day of Kickapoo was scheduled on April 25, 2009. Volunteers were provided with the equipment necessary to remove litter from campsites and lakes. Since then there have been many cleanup efforts by local residents.

== Plant and animal species ==
Kickapoo State Recreation Area is home to a wide variety of plant and animal species. Middle Fork Woods Nature Preserve is located within Kickapoo State Park and is the only known location of the silvery salamander in Illinois. This nature preserve of 69.2 acres is home to many different tree species including white and black oak, hickory, blue beech, sugar maple, basswood, ironwood, redbud, and sassafras. Cypress trees have been planted along pond edges while strip mine banks have been naturally covered by cottonwood and ash trees. This variety of hardwood species colors the park in the fall season and attracts many visitors. In the springtime, a variety of wildflowers can also be seen including: violets, bluebells, spring beauties, Dutchman's-breeches, and nodding trilliums.

Of the 100 different bird species spotted within the park, the belted kingfisher, pileated woodpecker, red-winged blackbird, great blue heron, and least bittern are the most commonly seen. A birding checklist is available at the park office. In addition to the multitude of bird species spotted within the park, there are also a variety of mammals including white-tailed deer, squirrels, raccoons, cottontail rabbits, and muskrats.

== Recreational activities ==
=== Camping ===
Between the two campgrounds within the park there are 184 sites available for tent camping and trailer camping. Reservations can be made at online at Reserve America, however there are a number of walk-in sites for back country tent campers. The maximum length of stay is 14 days within a 30-day period. Almost half of the sites have electric hookups and there are two shower houses which are open from May 1 through November 1. Note that campers staying at sites with electric hookups must pay for the availability of electricity even if it is never used. Campers must also have their own camping equipment as well as their camping permit before entering the campgrounds.

=== Fishing ===
There are many fish species found within the park's 22 ponds and the Vermilion River. Some of the most common catches by fishermen are largemouth and smallmouth bass, catfish, bluegill, crappie, and redear sunfish according to the Illinois Department of Natural Resources. Rainbow trout is another popular fish species to catch in the fall and spring months when the lakes are stocked.

=== Boating ===
For boating activities, there are 12 launching ramps on 9 of the lakes in Kickapoo State Park although only electric motors are allowed on these lakes. Kickapoo Adventures, previously known as Kickapoo Landing, is a concession place within the park offering canoe, paddle board, tube, and kayak rentals, shuttle services to parts of the Middle Fork of the Vermilion River, bait, firewood, and a restaurant for visitors to enjoy. Visitors may rent boats by the hour for use on Clear Lake within the park, or sign up for a trip down the Middle Fork of the Vermilion River with a canoe, kayak, or inner tube. The tube trip is 2 miles long starting at Sportsman's Lake and ending in the state park. For visitors wishing to partake in kayaking or canoeing activities down the river they may choose between a 13-mile trip beginning at Kinny's Ford, an 8-mile trip starting at Bunker Hill, or a combination of 2 miles on the Vermilion River and paddling through 3 lakes in the park. In addition to rental services, Kickapoo Adventures sells fishing licenses, tackle, and an assortment of worms for bait. The concession also has live music at the dockside cafe Tuesday and Friday nights all summer long.

=== Hiking ===
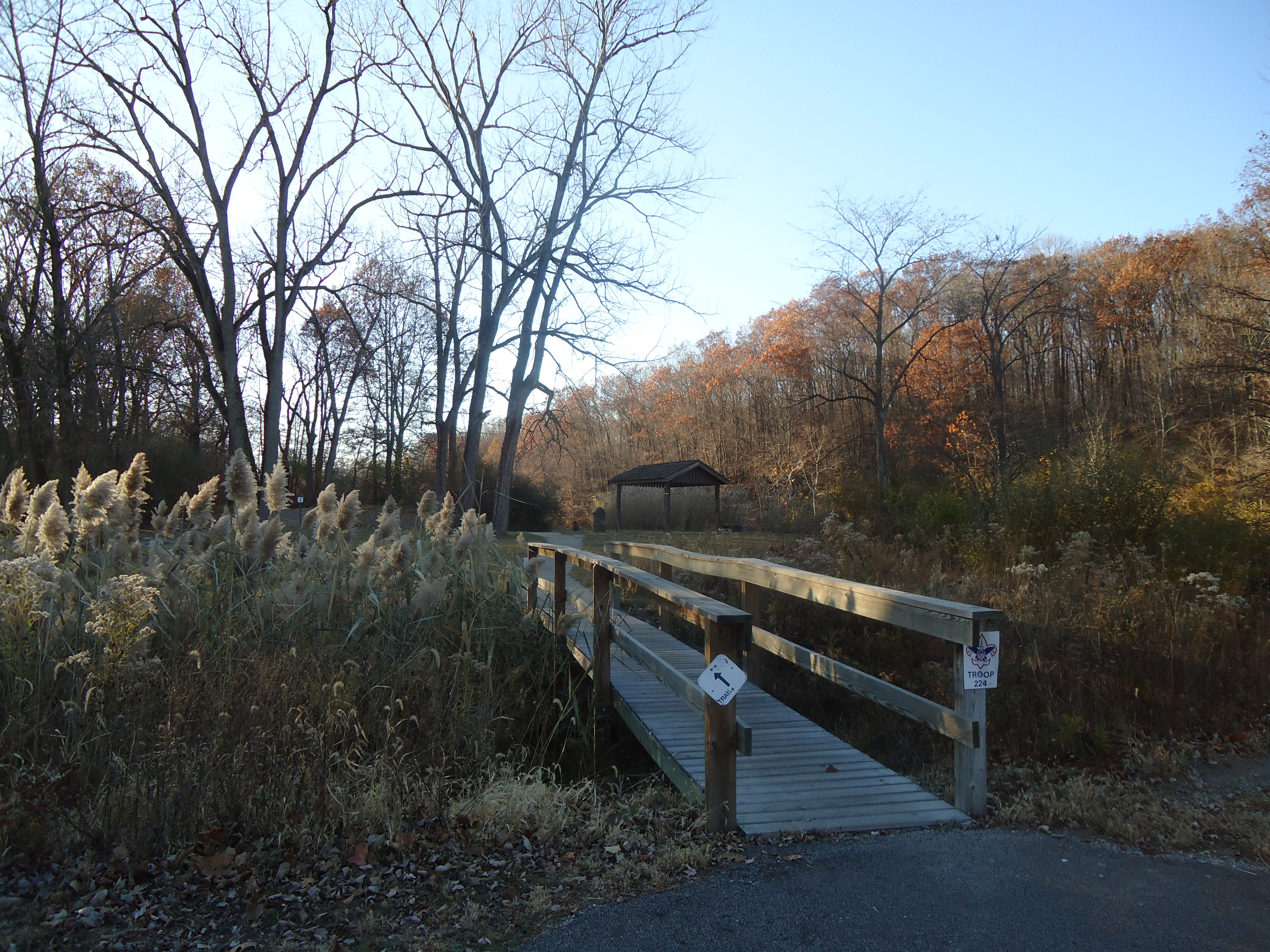
Trail in Kickapoo State Park near High Pond

There are 7 marked hiking trails within Kickapoo State Recreation Area. One of the more challenging trails is the 7.6-mile Out and Back running trail which winds through forest and edges of cropland. The Out and Back trail is also the longest trail in the park and ran from the group camp area across the Johnson Hill Bridge. However, the Johnson Hill Bridge was demolished in 2006, significantly limiting the length of this trail. The Mountain Bike Trail is a 6.5-mile trail which circles Stump Pond and is located in the northeastern corner of the park. Some of the other shorter trails are: Clear Lake Trail (3 miles), Nature Trail (0.75 miles), High Lake Trail (1.5 miles), Riverview Trail (2.0 miles), and Brian Plawer Nature Trail (0.9 miles). High Lake Trail also has a 0.2-mile portion which is ADA accessible.

=== Mountain biking ===
Over 200 acres have been allocated for mountain bike use in the park. There are 11 mountain biking routes in this area, ranging from easy to difficult, located in the northeast section of Kickapoo State Park. Some of the more difficult trails have 1–2 foot jumps, steep inclines, switchbacks, and benchcut ravines. The bike trails wind through the forest, abandoned strip mine area, and along the Vermilion River. Mountain bike trails are open for visitors to use year-round, although they close during the annual fall firearm hunting seasons (usually falling on 2 to 4 weekends in November and December), and occasionally due to extended muddy conditions such as the spring thaw or damage following heavy storms.

=== Hunting ===
Registered hunters (using firearms or bows) are allowed to hunt white-tailed deer, cock pheasant, rabbit, and squirrels in the park twice a year. There are over 1,000 acres of land for hunters to use each fall. Trap and archery ranges are available to visitors to Kickapoo State Park as well.

=== Other ===
Other recreational activities at Kickapoo State Recreation Area include cross-country skiing and scuba diving, and is one of the few state parks in Illinois that allows scuba diving. Certified divers may explore the depths of Inland Sea and Sportsman's Lake. A company by the name of Thunder Wolf Trail Rides used to offer horseback riding lessons, trail rides, hay rides, and birthday parties in the park area but it closed in 2015.
