= Lake Vermilion (Illinois) =

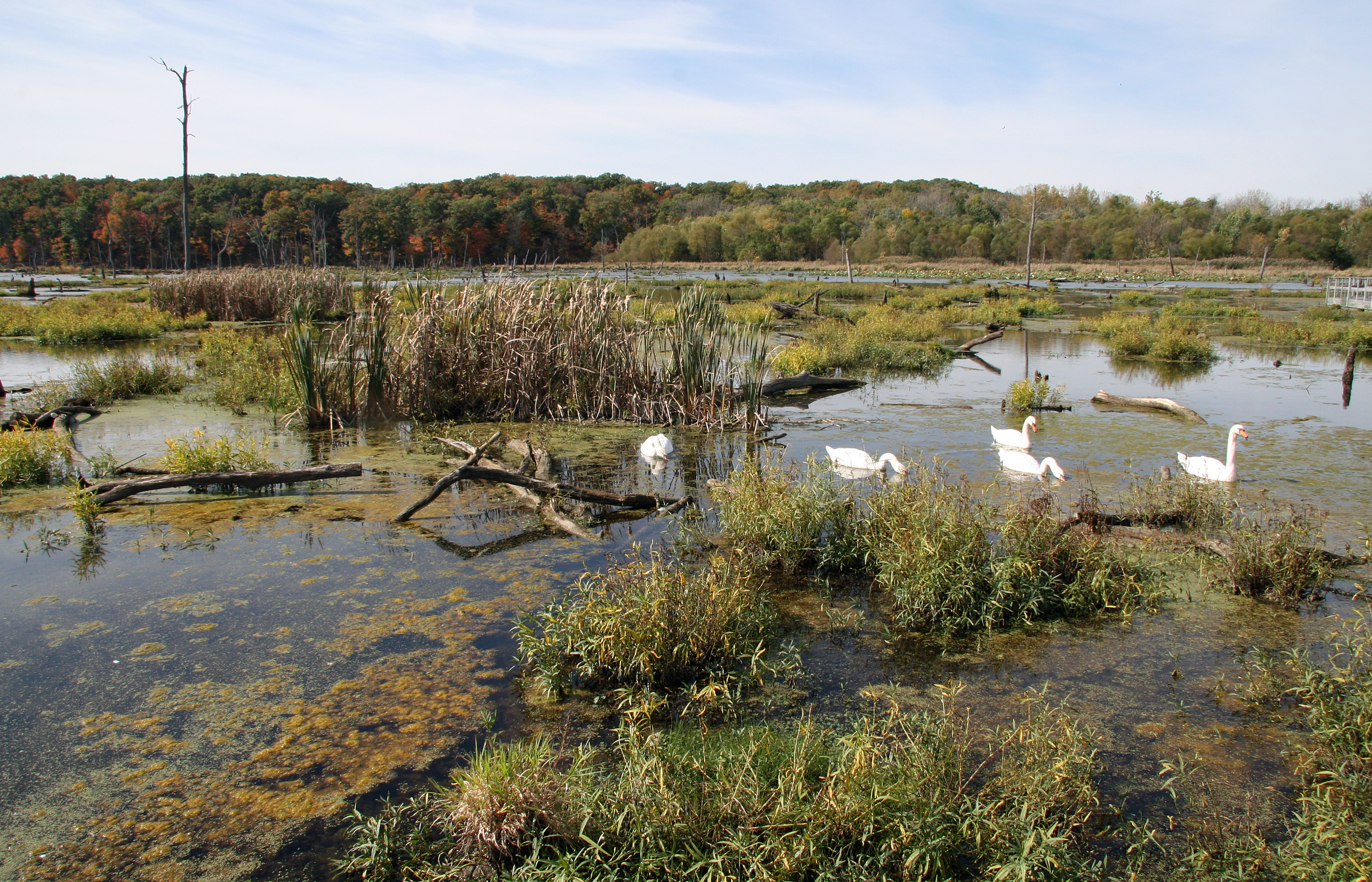
- Kennekuk Marshes, a wetlands area at the northern end of Lake Vermilion

- Location within Illinois Location within the United States
- Location: Vermilion County, Illinois
- Coordinates: 40°09′22″N 87°39′08″W
- Type: reservoir
- Primary inflows: Vermilion River
- Primary outflows: Vermilion River
- Basin countries: United States
- Max. length: 3 mi (4.8 km)
- Max. width: 0.5 mi (0.80 km)
- Surface area: 1,000 acres (400 ha)
- Surface elevation: 581 ft (177 m)

Lake Vermilion is a 1,000 acres (400 ha) reservoir located in Vermilion County, Illinois. It was built for water supply, fishing, and recreation purposes. The lake is 3 miles (4.8 km) long and 0.5 miles (0.80 km) wide. The nearest city is Danville, in eastern Illinois.

Lake Vermilion is managed by the Vermilion County Conservation District (VCCD) for bass, catfish, and crappie. The nearest interstate highway exit is Exit 215 on Interstate 74, near Danville.

The lake is owned by Aqua Illinois, a subsidiary of Aqua America. The rules of the lake allow unlimited-horsepower marine boating, jetskiing, and waterskiing. Boat decals are required.

== Fishing ==
Lake Vermilion contains the following species:

- Bluegill
- Carp
- Channel catfish
- Largemouth bass
- White crappie
- White bass
- Yellow bass
- Yellow bullhead
