= Belgium, Illinois =

Belgium
- Village (United States)
- Location of Belgium in Vermilion County, Illinois.

- Belgium's location in Vermilion County Belgium (Illinois) Belgium (the United States) Belgium (North America)
- Coordinates: 40°3′38.73″N 87°37′58.19″W
- Country: United States
- State: Illinois
- County: Vermilion
- Township: Danville, Georgetown

Area
  - Total: 0.43 sq mi (1.12 km^{2})
  - Land: 0.43 sq mi (1.12 km^{2})
  - Water: 0 sq mi (0.00 km^{2})
- Elevation: 656 ft (200 m)

Population (2020)
  - Total: 358
  - Density: 825.7/sq mi (318.81/km^{2})
- Time zone: UTC-6 (CST)
  - Summer (DST): UTC-5 (CDT)
- ZIP code: 61883
- Area code: 217
- FIPS code: 17-04689
- GNIS ID: 2398070
- Website: http://www.belgiumillinois.us/

Belgium is a village in Vermilion County, Illinois, United States. It is part of the Metropolitan Statistical Area of Danville, Illinois. The population was 358 at the 2020 census.

== Geography ==
According to the 2020 census, Belgium has a total area of 0.43 square miles (1.11 km^{2}), all land.

== Demographics ==
Historical population
Census	Pop.	Note	%±
1910	433		—
1920	489		12.9%
1930	484		−1.0%
1940	472		−2.5%
1950	493		4.4%
1960	494		0.2%
1970	578		17.0%
1980	568		−1.7%
1990	511		−10.0%
2000	466		−8.8%
2010	404		−13.3%
2020	358		−11.4%
U.S. Decennial Census

As of the 2020 census, there were 358 people and 142 households residing in the village. The population density was 49.7 inhabitants per square mile (19.2/km^{2}). There were 167 housing units at an average density of 477.3 units per square mile (184.3 units/km^{2}). The racial makeup of the village was 91.90% White, 3.07% from other races, and 3.07% from two or more races. Hispanic or Latino of any race were 1.95% of the population.

There were 142 households, out of which 26.8% had children under the age of 18 living with them, 31.0% were married couples living together, 38.70% had a female householder with no husband present. 24.6% of all households were made up of individuals, and 14.1% had someone living alone who was 65 years of age or older. The average household size was 2.04 and the average family size was 2.95.

In the village, the population was spread out, with 23.1% under the age of 18, 9.3% from 18 to 24, 34.5% from 15 to 44, 31.3% from 45 to 64, and 19.0% who were 65 years of age or older. The median age was 45.5 years. For every 100 females, there were 82.4 males.

The median income for a household in the village was $64,773, and the median income for a family was $87,500. Males had a median income of $61,333 versus $37,500 for females. The per capita income for the village was $30,630. About 9.5% of families and 16.2% of the population were below the poverty line, including 13.4% of those under age 18 and 9.1% of those age 65 or over.

== Transportation ==
Belgium is connected to multiple locations between Georgetown and Tilton via bus route 9 of the Danville Mass Transit.

== Education ==
Belgium is in the Westville Community Unit School District 2, which includes an elementary school, a junior high, and Westville High School.
