= Jamesburg, Illinois =

Jamesburg
- Unincorporated community
- Vermilion County's location in Illinois

- Jamesburg's location in Vermilion County
- Coordinates: 40°15′44″N 87°44′56″W
- Country: United States
- State: Illinois
- County: Vermilion County
- Township: Blount Township
- Elevation: 682 ft (208 m)
- ZIP code: 61865
- GNIS feature ID: 0411031

Jamesburg is an unincorporated community in Blount Township, Vermilion County, Illinois, United States.

== Geography ==
Jamesburg is located at 40°15′44″N 87°44′56″W at an elevation of 682 feet.
