= Potomac, Illinois =

Potomac
- Village (United States)
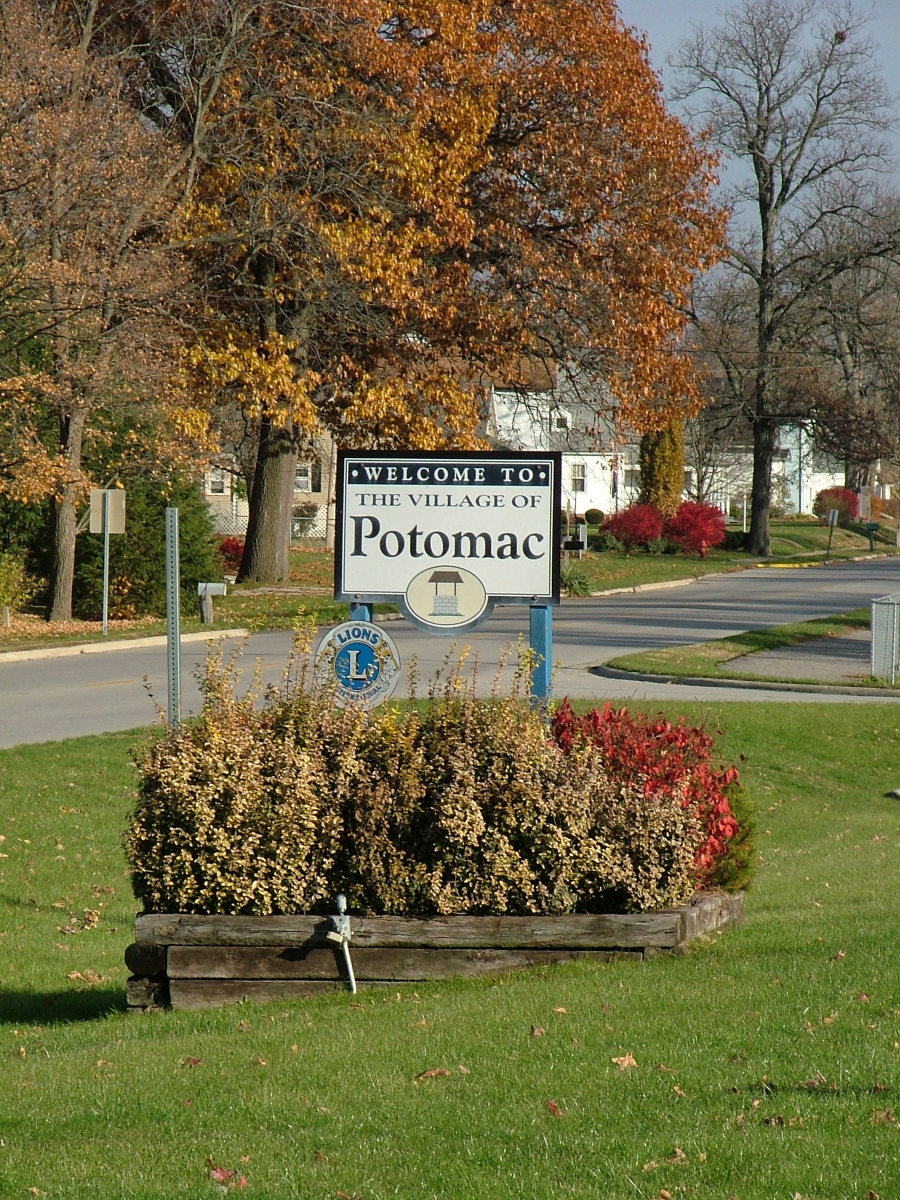
- Welcome signs in Potomac

- Location of Potomac in Vermilion County, Illinois.

- Potomac's location in Vermilion County
- Coordinates: 40°18′24″N 87°47′51″W
- Country: United States
- State: Illinois
- County: Vermilion
- Township: Middlefork

Area
  - Total: 0.49 sq mi (1.26 km^{2})
  - Land: 0.49 sq mi (1.26 km^{2})
  - Water: 0 sq mi (0.00 km^{2})
- Elevation: 669 ft (204 m)

Population (2020)
  - Total: 689
  - Density: 1,411.6/sq mi (545.02/km^{2})
- Time zone: UTC-6 (CST)
  - Summer (DST): UTC-5 (CDT)
- ZIP code: 61865
- Area code: 217
- FIPS code: 17-61366
- GNIS ID: 2399011
- Website: www.villageofpotomacil.com

Potomac (/pəˈtoʊmək/) is a village in Vermilion County, Illinois, United States. It is part of the Danville, Illinois Metropolitan Statistical Area. As of the 2020 census, Potomac had a population of 689.

== History ==
The town was originally named Marysville after the wives of the two founders, John Smith and Isaac Meneley, who started businesses here circa 1840. On May 13, 1871, a post office was established at the town and was named Potomac, most likely after the Potomac River. The town's name was later changed to conform to this.

The town was hit by a tornado in April 1953, injuring a dozen people.

Potomac prospered into the late 20th century, with a population peaking at 900 during the 1970 census, due in part to its location along US Route 136, one of the primary east–west highways crossing the state of Illinois. The opening of Interstate 74 reduced the amount of travel through Potomac, leading to a rapid decline in the number of service stations, restaurants and small businesses in the downtown area in the early 1970s. In the early 1990s a fire destroyed several downtown buildings on the north side of Route 136, dramatically altering the appearance of the community.

Potomac is known for its Artesian wells, and its local High School teams were known as the "Potomac Artesians" until area secondary school consolidation in the mid 90's. One of these wells spouted an eight-inch stream of water 32 feet into the air until the 1930s. Three wells presently operate in open areas, one located in the downtown area, another on the southeast edge of the community, and another in West Side Park, on the west edge of town area where Fourth of July celebrations were once held, locally referred to as "The Jubilee", in conjunction with an annual Horse Show.

Hugh M. Luckey (1873–1946), farmer and Illinois state legislator, was born near Potomac, on a farm.

== Geography ==
Potomac is located approximately 18 miles northwest of the county seat of Danville. U.S. Route 136 passes east–west through town. The Middle Fork of the Vermilion River passes just south of the town.

According to the 2010 census, Potomac has a total area of 0.49 square miles (1.27 km^{2}), all land.

== Demographics ==
Historical population
Census	Pop.	Note	%±
1880	368		—
1890	186		−49.5%
1900	764		310.8%
1910	742		−2.9%
1920	733		−1.2%
1930	643		−12.3%
1940	646		0.5%
1950	602		−6.8%
1960	661		9.8%
1970	909		37.5%
1980	874		−3.9%
1990	753		−13.8%
2000	681		−9.6%
2010	750		10.1%
2020	689		−8.1%
U.S. Decennial Census

As of the census of 2000, there were 681 people, 252 households, and 191 families residing in the village. The population density was 1,408.5 inhabitants per square mile (543.8/km^{2}). There were 277 housing units at an average density of 572.9 per square mile (221.2/km^{2}). The racial makeup of the village was 97.21% White, 0.29% Native American, 0.29% Pacific Islander, 1.62% from other races, and 0.59% from two or more races. Hispanic or Latino of any race were 2.20% of the population.

There were 252 households, out of which 36.5% had children under the age of 18 living with them, 60.7% were married couples living together, 9.1% had a female householder with no husband present, and 24.2% were non-families. 21.0% of all households were made up of individuals, and 13.1% had someone living alone who was 65 years of age or older. The average household size was 2.70 and the average family size was 3.11.

In the village, the population was spread out, with 28.8% under the age of 18, 6.9% from 18 to 24, 28.6% from 25 to 44, 21.6% from 45 to 64, and 14.1% who were 65 years of age or older. The median age was 35 years. For every 100 females, there were 97.4 males. For every 100 females age 18 and over, there were 96.4 males.

The median income for a household in the village was $40,221, and the median income for a family was $44,583. Males had a median income of $32,031 versus $21,417 for females. The per capita income for the village was $15,197. About 4.8% of families and 9.1% of the population were below the poverty line, including 13.2% of those under age 18 and 15.3% of those age 65 or over.

== Education ==
It is in the Potomac Community Unit School District 10.
