= Vermilion Regional Airport =

- IATA: DNV; ICAO: KDNV; FAA LID: DNV

Summary
- Airport type: Public
- Owner: Vermilion Regional Airport Authority
- Serves: Danville, Illinois
- Elevation AMSL: 697 ft / 212 m
- Coordinates: 40°11′57″N 087°35′44″W
- Website: www.vrairport.com

Map

Runways
Direction	Length		Surface
Direction	ft	m	Surface
3/21	6,006	1,831	Asphalt
16/34	3,999	1,219	Asphalt

Statistics
- Aircraft operations (2020): 18,150
- Based aircraft (2020): 55
- Source: Federal Aviation Administration

Vermilion Regional Airport (IATA: DNV, ICAO: KDNV, FAA LID: DNV) is a public-use airport located five miles northeast of Danville, the largest city in Vermilion County, Illinois. It is publicly owned by the Vermilion Regional Airport Authority. The FAA's National Plan of Integrated Airport Systems for 2017–2021 categorized it as a general aviation basic facility.

It was formerly Vermilion County Airport, under which name it opened in 1948.

Airline flights began in 1950 on Ozark; Lake Central arrived in 1954-55 and Ozark left in 1961. Allegheny Commuter flights ended sometime after 1973. The airport currently gets has regular flights from Air Cargo Carriers and gets aerial agricultural flights as well. The airport also features both a flying club and a glider club as well as aircraft maintenance facilities.

== Facilities ==
The airport covers 817 acres (331 ha). It has two asphalt runways: 3/21 is 6,006 by 100 feet (1,831 x 30 m) with an ILS; 16/34 is 3,999 by 100 feet (1,219 x 30 m). The airport also has runway 12/30, a turf runway measuring 2500 x 150 ft (762 x 46 m).

The airport also features pilot facilities like a 24-hour lounge and hangar rentals.The former terminal building is now a banquet and conference center called Cloud 9.

== Aircraft ==
For the 12-month period ending April 30, 2020, the airport had 18,150 aircraft operations, an average of 50 per day: 93% general aviation, 6% air taxi and 1% military. In November 2020, there were 55 aircraft based at the airport: 48 single-engine, 5 multi-engine, 1 helicopter and 1 glider.

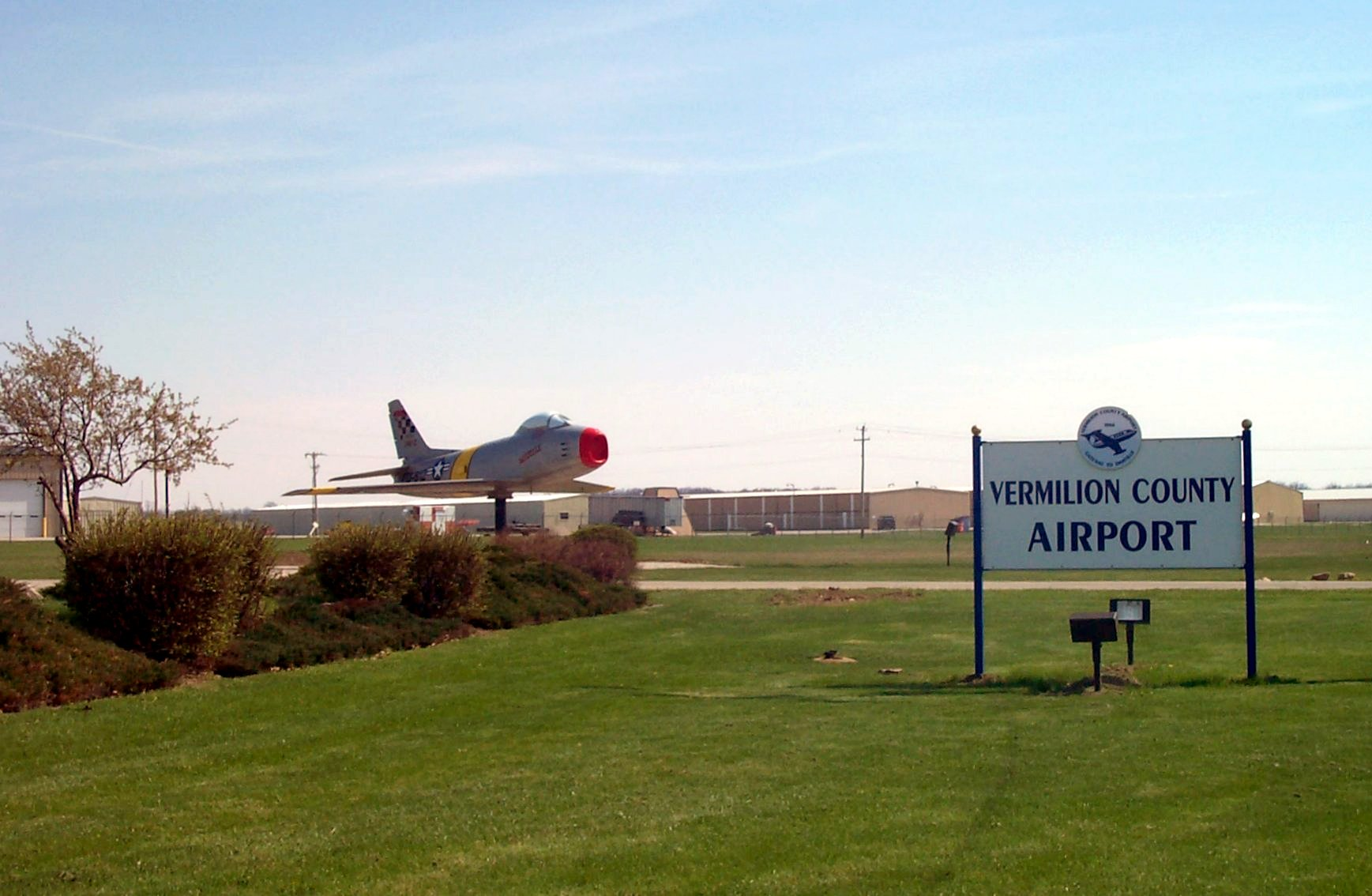
Airport entrance

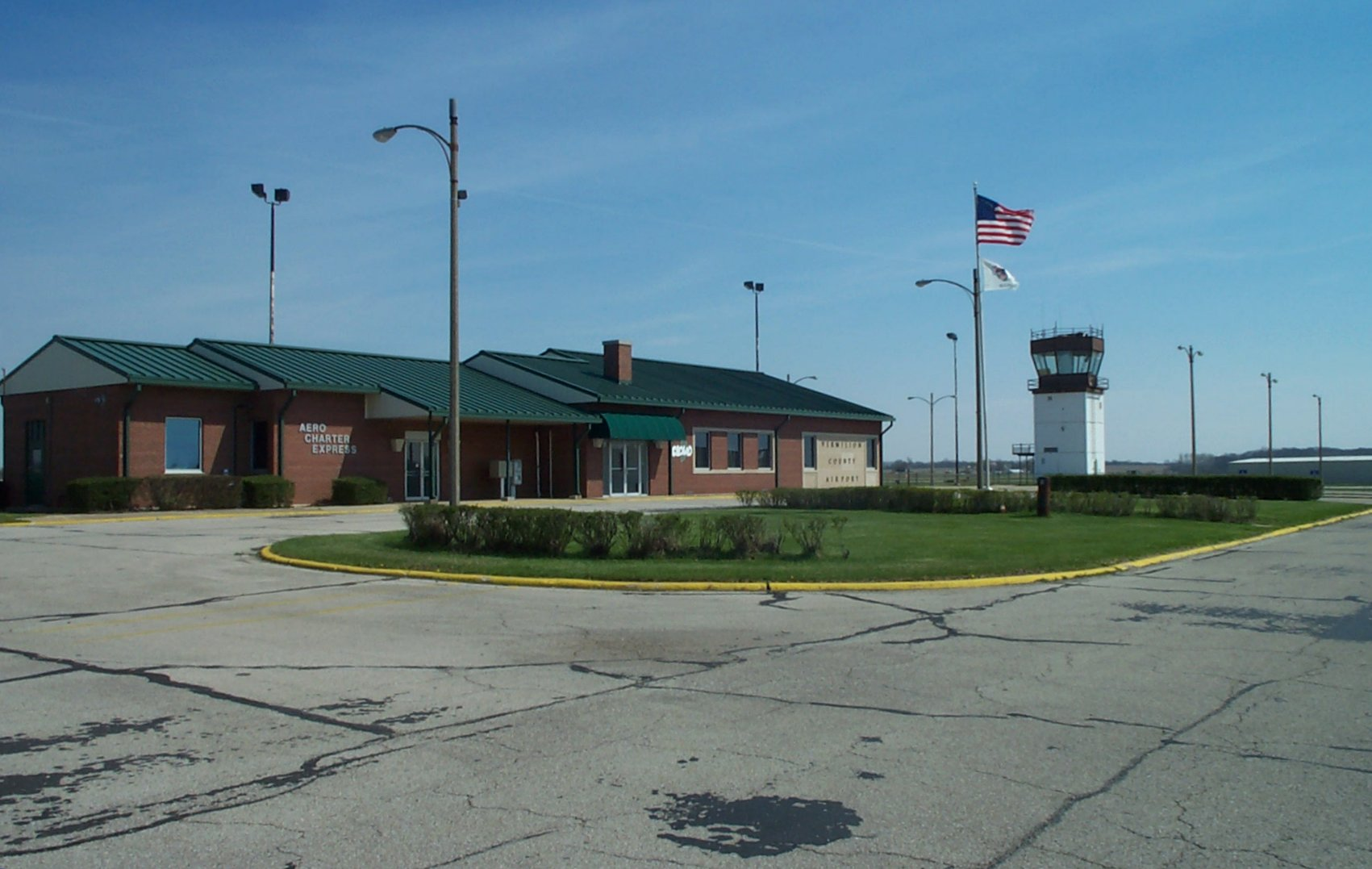
Former terminal and unused control tower

== Airlines and Destinations ==
=== Cargo ===
Airlines	Destinations
Air Cargo Carriers	Louisville

== Ground transportation ==
While no public transit service is provided directly to the airport, Danville Mass Transit provides bus service nearby.

== See also ==
- List of airports in Illinois
