= Oakwood, Illinois =

Oakwood Village of Oakwood
- Village
- Location of Oakwood in Vermilion County, Illinois.

- Oakwood's location in Vermilion County
- Coordinates: 40°6′36″N 87°46′37″W
- Country: United States
- State: Illinois
- County: Vermilion
- Township: Oakwood

Area
  - Total: 0.93 sq mi (2.40 km^{2})
  - Land: 0.93 sq mi (2.40 km^{2})
  - Water: 0 sq mi (0.00 km^{2}) 0%
- Elevation: 640 ft (200 m)

Population (2020)
  - Total: 1,325
  - Density: 1,427.4/sq mi (551.11/km^{2})
- Time zone: UTC-6 (CST)
  - Summer (DST): UTC-5 (CDT)
- ZIP code: 61858
- Area code: 217
- FIPS code: 17-55002
- GNIS ID: 2399547
- Website: oakwoodil.org

Oakwood is a village in Oakwood Township, Vermilion County, Illinois, United States. It is part of the Danville, Illinois Metropolitan Statistical Area. The population was 1,325 in the 2020 census.

== History ==
The area where Oakwood currently is built was historically inhabited by the Kickapoo, Potawatomi, Pienkeshaw, all tribes of indigenous peoples; the indigenous peoples discovered the salts mines which would later become the start of the town's economy.

The first white presence in the area was that of the French, who documented the salty water near the Vermilion River in 1706. In the early 1800s, fur trappers employed by John Jacob Astor's American Fur Company arrived in the area. The indigenous peoples were driven westward into reservations as a result of several treaties over the course of the early 1800s.

In October 1819 an army surveyor team of white settlers and Shawnee hired guides arrived in the region, searching for salt mines. They established wells and salt mining in the area. In 1824, Major John W. Vance came from Urbana, Ohio and gained control of the mine, increasing production by bringing in more iron kettles to boil the saltwater down. Due to competition from other mines the mine eventually shut down in the late 1830s/early 1840s.

From the 1860s onward coal mining became a major source of jobs and industry in Vermilion County.

The village of Oakwood is named after Henry Oakwood, an early settler in the area who arrived in 1833. The township of Oakwood was created in 1868 and Oakwood station (which would become the village) was created in 1870. The impetus for the formation of Oakwood Station was the arrival of the Indianapolis, Bloomington, and Western (IB&W) Railroad, which arrived in 1870 and led to the platting of Oakwood, Fithian, and Muncie. The early town suffered multiple hardships, with a fire damaging half of the new buildings in 1871 and smallpox infecting 15 and killing 2 in 1872. By 1880 the population had increased to 99 people. In 1885 two local men started a field tile factory, supplied by locally dug clay; this factory would enable the tiling of most of the local farmland. A hotel operated on the northwest corner of Scott and Collett Streets from 1892 until around 1920; rooms cost one dollar per day. By 1897 the population was 367 people; the village suffered its second large fire in on September 24, 1897. In June 1901 a telephone exchange was placed in E.M. Snyder's Restaurant by the Danville Telephone Company. Around 1902 the volunteer fire department was founded. In 1903 an interurban rail line (for passengers) running from Champaign to Danville stopped for passengers in Oakwood for the first time. The bank of Oakwood was established in 1907. The first automobile owned by an Oakwood resident was believed to have been a Kiblinger purchased by Dr. Hensley in 1908. Electricity officially came to Oakwood on November 30, 1912 (though some businesses may have had it slightly earlier) with a grand ceremony wherein the mayor pushed a button and all of the streets were lit. By 1920 the population was 506, and Oakwood had its own fire engine. Many Oakwood residents served in both WWI and WWII. Sometime during the 1940s the town voted to go "dry" and prohibit the sale of any alcoholic beverages. The 1950s brought the retirement of Bill Cronkite, the ice delivery man (as most people now had refrigerators) and the closing of the railway depot (which the village had started around); the 1960s brought Interstate 74 and a population boom, during which the population rose from 861 people in 1960 to 1,367 people in 1970. In 1987 the town voted to repeal its dry status and allow alcohol sales again. Through the late 1980s the town established a public library district and acquired the old bank building in 1992; the current building was built in 1998. In 1997 the Oakwood United Methodist Church was the site of a bombing.

Major churches in the town's history have included: Oakwood United Methodist Church (Methodist organizing in the area started in the 1830s; the current building was built in 1884); Oakwood Christian Church, (gathering started in the 1880s and the building was finished in 1892); Oakwood Church of the Nazarene (meetings started in 1934 and the building was completed in 1938); and the Oakwood Evangelical Methodist Church (founded in 1968 after splitting from the Evangelical United Brethren Church, and the building was finished in 1970).

== Geography ==
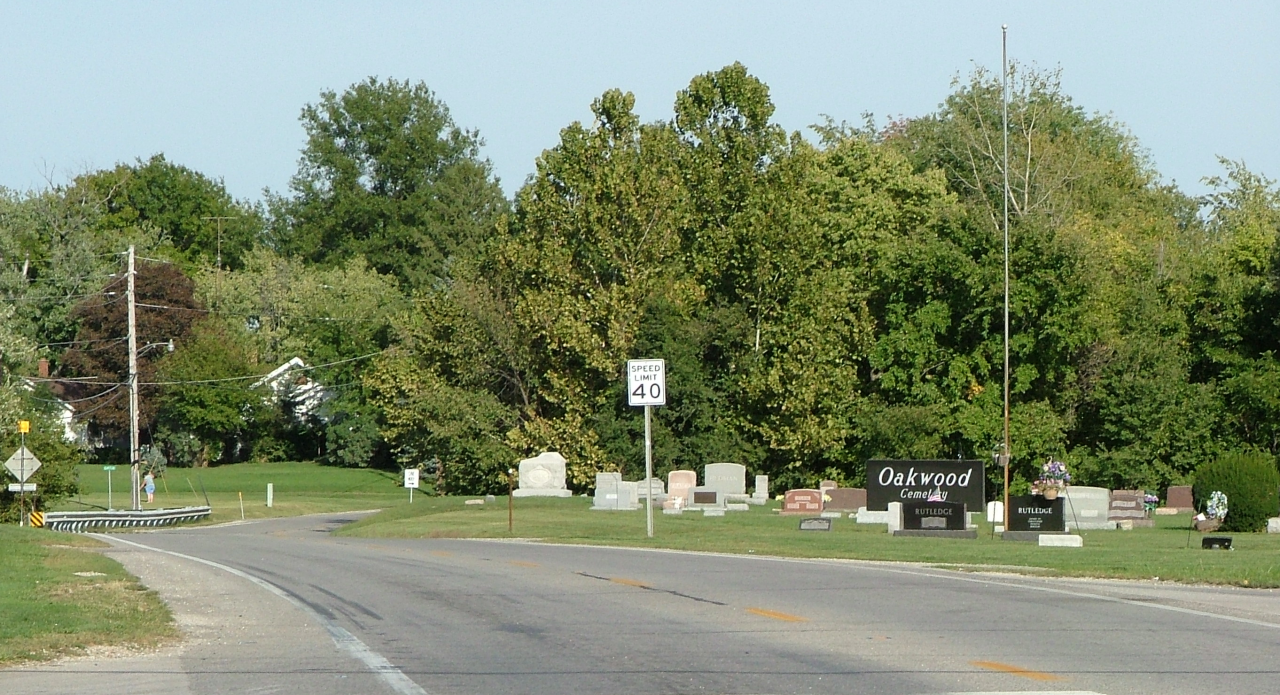
Looking east on U.S. Route 150

According to the 2010 census, Oakwood has a total area of 0.93 square miles (2.41 km^{2}), all land.

== Demographics ==
Historical population
Census	Pop.	Note	%±
1880	99		—
1910	423		—
1920	573		35.5%
1930	537		−6.3%
1940	555		3.4%
1950	641		15.5%
1960	861		34.3%
1970	1,367		58.8%
1980	1,627		19.0%
1990	1,533		−5.8%
2000	1,502		−2.0%
2010	1,595		6.2%
2020	1,325		−16.9%
U.S. Decennial Census

=== 2020 census ===
As of the 2020 census, Oakwood had a population of 1,325. The median age was 42.0 years. 23.3% of residents were under the age of 18 and 20.9% of residents were 65 years of age or older. For every 100 females there were 82.8 males, and for every 100 females age 18 and over there were 80.8 males age 18 and over.

0.0% of residents lived in urban areas, while 100.0% lived in rural areas.

There were 592 households in Oakwood, of which 31.8% had children under the age of 18 living in them. Of all households, 39.0% were married-couple households, 15.4% were households with a male householder and no spouse or partner present, and 36.7% were households with a female householder and no spouse or partner present. About 34.6% of all households were made up of individuals and 17.2% had someone living alone who was 65 years of age or older.

There were 679 housing units, of which 12.8% were vacant. The homeowner vacancy rate was 1.3% and the rental vacancy rate was 26.2%.

Racial composition as of the 2020 census
Race	Number	Percent
White	1,208	91.2%
Black or African American	14	1.1%
American Indian and Alaska Native	5	0.4%
Asian	3	0.2%
Native Hawaiian and Other Pacific Islander	0	0.0%
Some other race	13	1.0%
Two or more races	82	6.2%
Hispanic or Latino (of any race)	28	2.1%

=== 2000 census ===
There were 621 households, out of which 34.3% had children under the age of 18 living with them, 52.3% were married couples living together, 14.0% had a female householder with no husband present, and 29.8% were non-families. 25.6% of all households were made up of individuals, and 13.5% had someone living alone who was 65 years of age or older. The average household size was 2.42 and the average family size was 2.87.

In the village, the population was spread out, with 26.5% under the age of 18, 8.3% from 18 to 24, 27.4% from 25 to 44, 24.8% from 45 to 64, and 13.0% who were 65 years of age or older. The median age was 36 years. For every 100 females, there were 92.1 males. For every 100 females age 18 and over, there were 82.5 males.

The median income for a household in the village was $41,477, and the median income for a family was $44,583. Males had a median income of $31,107 versus $23,320 for females. The per capita income for the village was $18,655. About 7.8% of families and 8.1% of the population were below the poverty line, including 11.5% of those under age 18 and 10.1% of those age 65 or over.

== Education ==
It is in the Oakwood Community Unit School District 76.

- Oakwood Grade School

Mascot: "Stars"

- Oakwood Junior High School

Mascot: "Knights"

- Oakwood High School

Mascot:"Comets"
Song: "Cheer, Cheer, for old Oakwood's fame. Wake up the echoes cheering her name. Send the volley cheer on high. Shake down the thunder from the sky. What though the odds be great or small, old Oakwood High will win overall, while her loyal sons are marching onward to victory. Repeat."

== Notable people ==
- Margaret W. Campbell was buried in the family plot in an Oakwood Cemetery
- Alan Dysert, actor (All My Children)
- Darrin Fletcher, catcher for several Major League Baseball teams.
- Cameron Lee, offensive lineman for several National Football League teams
- Bobby Pierce, racing driver on several national tours
- Angela Watson, actress (Step by Step)
