= Muncie, Illinois =

Muncie
- Village
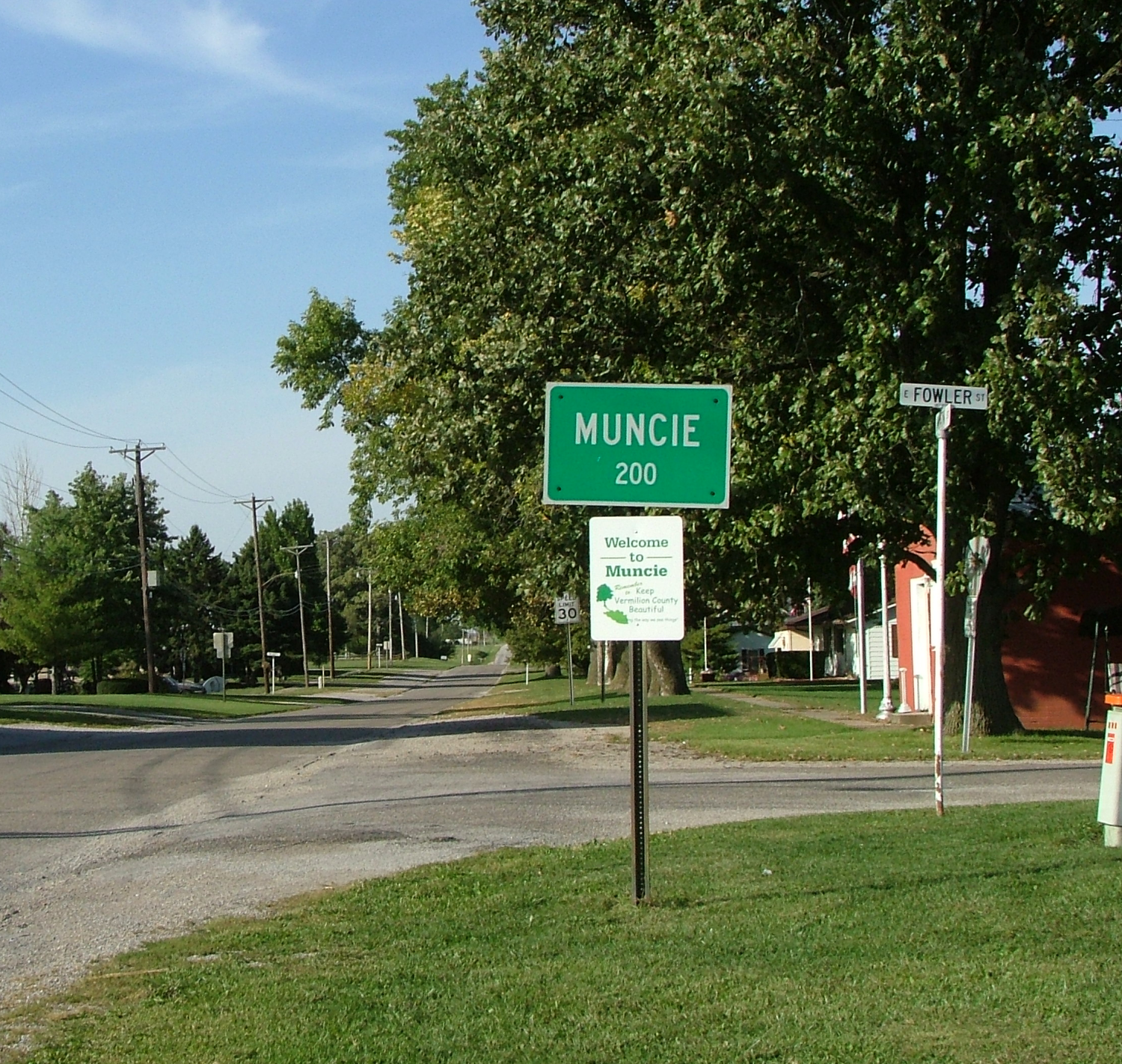
- Looking north into Muncie

- Location of Muncie in Vermilion County, Illinois.

- Oakwood's location in Vermilion County
- Coordinates: 40°06′58″N 87°50′35″W
- Country: United States
- State: Illinois
- County: Vermilion
- Township: Oakwood

Area
  - Total: 0.18 sq mi (0.46 km^{2})
  - Land: 0.18 sq mi (0.46 km^{2})
  - Water: 0 sq mi (0.00 km^{2})
- Elevation: 643 ft (196 m)

Population (2020)
  - Total: 157
  - Density: 880/sq mi (339/km^{2})
- Time zone: UTC-6 (CST)
  - Summer (DST): UTC-5 (CDT)
- ZIP code: 61857
- Area code: 217
- FIPS code: 17-51336
- GNIS ID: 2399427
- Website: muncieillinois.weebly.com

Muncie is a village in Oakwood Township, Vermilion County, Illinois, United States. It is part of the Danville, Illinois Metropolitan Statistical Area. As of the 2020 census, Muncie had a population of 157.

== Geography ==
According to the 2010 census, Muncie has a total area of 0.18 square miles (0.47 km^{2}), all land.

== Demographics ==
Historical population
Census	Pop.	Note	%±
1880	81		—
1900	324		—
1910	251		−22.5%
1920	248		−1.2%
1930	222		−10.5%
1940	200		−9.9%
1950	197		−1.5%
1960	195		−1.0%
1970	232		19.0%
1980	201		−13.4%
1990	182		−9.5%
2000	155		−14.8%
2010	146		−5.8%
2020	157		7.5%
U.S. Decennial Census

As of the census of 2000, there were 155 people, 69 households, and 42 families residing in the village. The population density was 859.5 inhabitants per square mile (331.9/km^{2}). There were 70 housing units at an average density of 388.1 per square mile (149.8/km^{2}). The racial makeup of the village was 100.00% White.

There were 69 households, out of which 23.2% had children under the age of 18 living with them, 50.7% were married couples living together, 7.2% had a female householder with no husband present, and 39.1% were non-families. 27.5% of all households were made up of individuals, and 10.1% had someone living alone who was 65 years of age or older. The average household size was 2.25 and the average family size was 2.81.

In the village, the population was spread out, with 19.4% under the age of 18, 11.6% from 18 to 24, 28.4% from 25 to 44, 24.5% from 45 to 64, and 16.1% who were 65 years of age or older. The median age was 38 years. For every 100 females, there were 91.4 males. For every 100 females age 18 and over, there were 98.4 males.

The median income for a household in the village was $36,964, and the median income for a family was $41,250. Males had a median income of $30,625 versus $20,625 for females. The per capita income for the village was $14,822. About 9.3% of families and 8.0% of the population were below the poverty line, including 4.4% of those under the age of eighteen and 15.4% of those 65 or over.

== Education ==
It is in the Oakwood Community Unit School District 76.
