= Sidney, Illinois =

Sidney
- Village
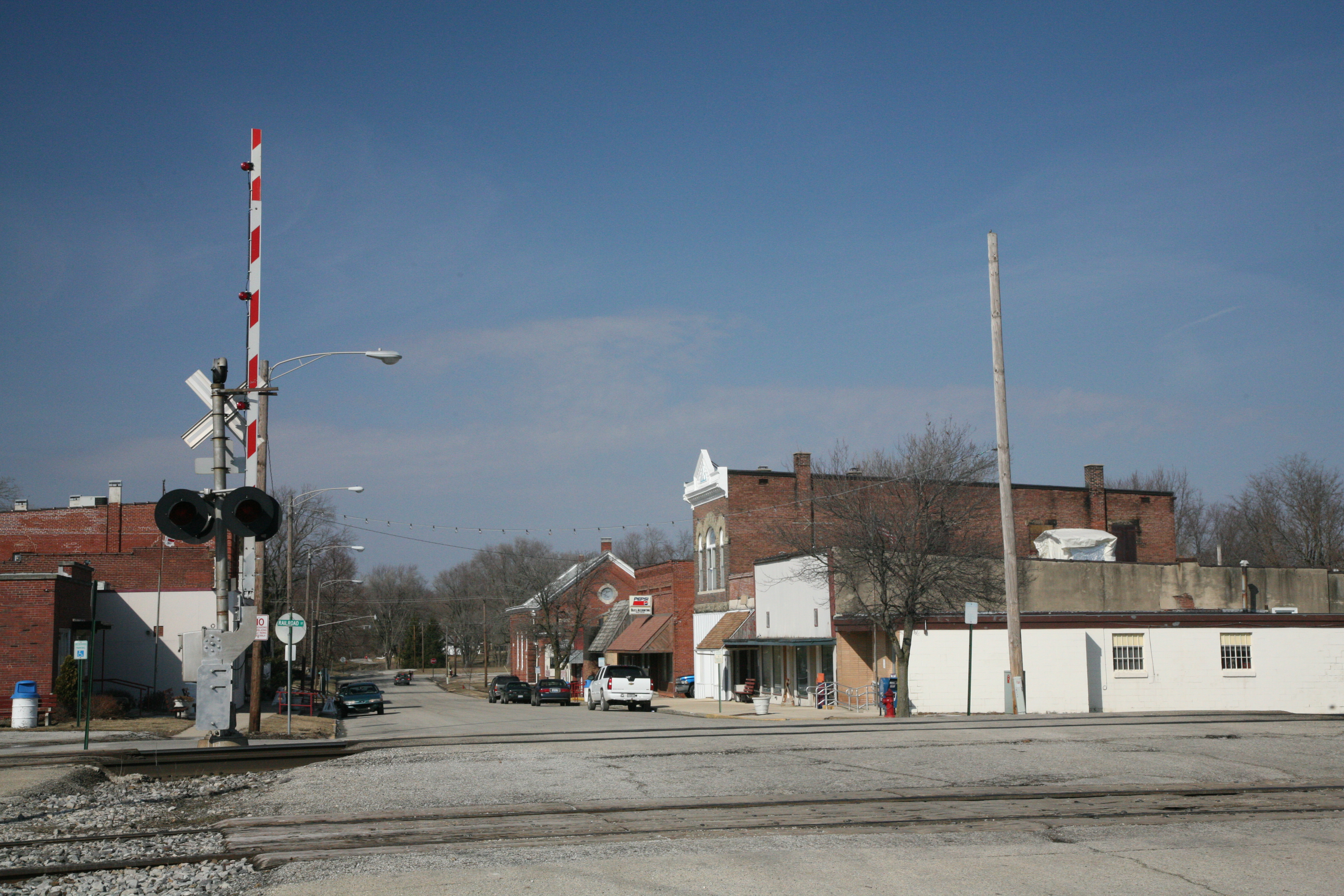
- Crossing on South David St.

- Location of Sidney in Champaign County, Illinois.

- Location within Champaign County Sidney (Illinois)
- Coordinates: 40°01′30″N 88°04′19″W
- Country: United States
- State: Illinois
- County: Champaign

Area
  - Total: 0.63 sq mi (1.63 km^{2})
  - Land: 0.63 sq mi (1.62 km^{2})
  - Water: 0.0039 sq mi (0.01 km^{2})
- Elevation: 656 ft (200 m)

Population (2020)
  - Total: 1,208
  - Density: 1,936.6/sq mi (747.71/km^{2})
- Time zone: UTC-6 (CST)
  - Summer (DST): UTC-5 (CDT)
- Zip code: 61877
- Area code: 217
- FIPS code: 17-69875
- GNIS feature ID: 2399820
- Website: http://villageofsidney.com/index.html

Sidney is a village in Champaign County, Illinois, United States. The population was 1,208 at the 2020 census.

== History ==
The Potawatomi Trail of Death passed through here in 1838.

== Geography ==
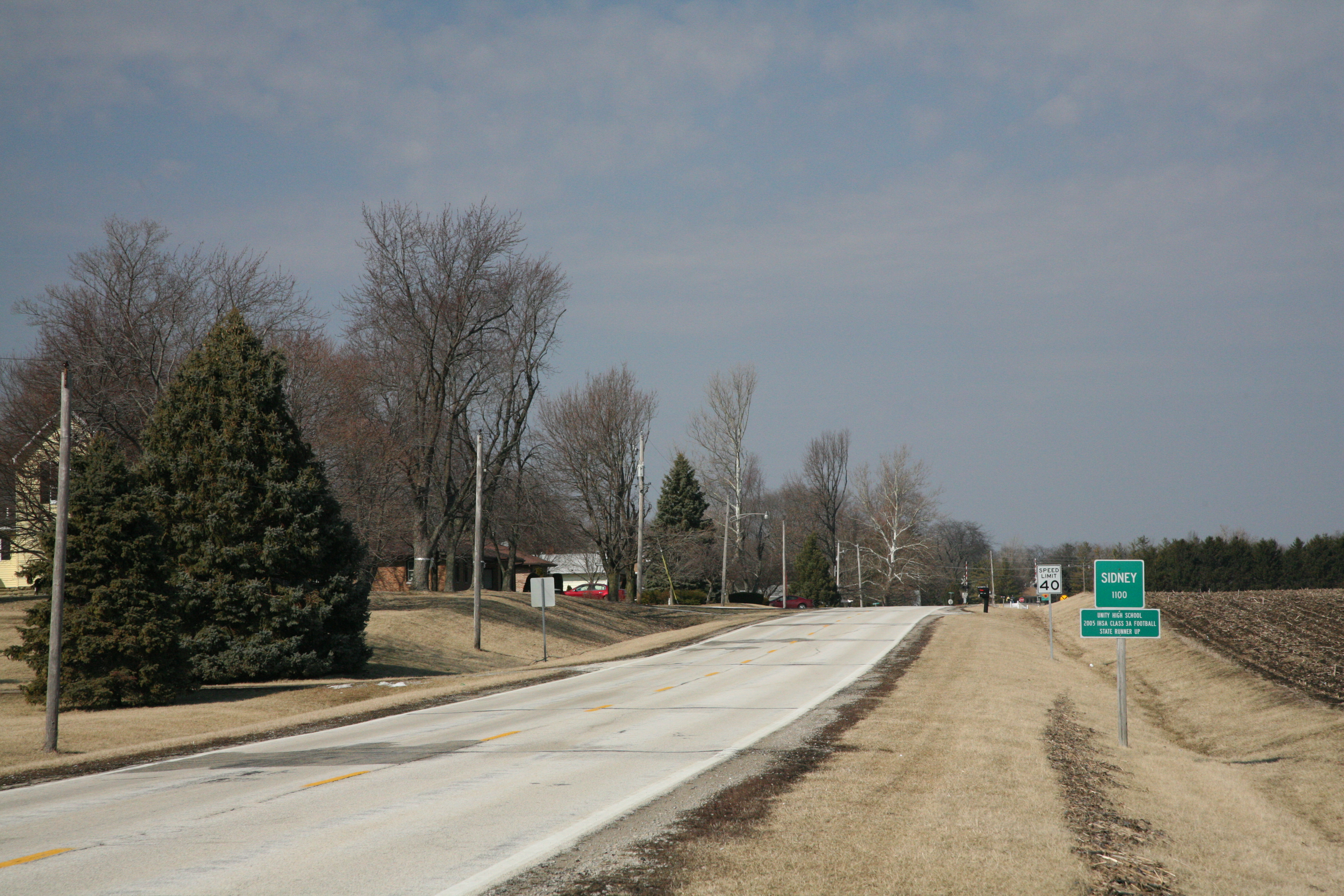
Approaching Sidney from the south.

According to the 2021 census gazetteer files, Sidney has a total area of 0.63 square miles (1.63 km^{2}), of which 0.62 square miles (1.61 km^{2}) (or 99.21%) is land and 0.01 square miles (0.03 km^{2}) (or 0.79%) is water.

== Demographics ==
Historical population
Census	Pop.	Note	%±
1870	480		—
1880	468		−2.5%
1890	581		24.1%
1900	564		−2.9%
1910	481		−14.7%
1920	546		13.5%
1930	539		−1.3%
1940	567		5.2%
1950	653		15.2%
1960	686		5.1%
1970	915		33.4%
1980	886		−3.2%
1990	1,027		15.9%
2000	1,062		3.4%
2010	1,233		16.1%
2020	1,208		−2.0%
U.S. Decennial Census

=== 2020 census ===
As of the 2020 census, Sidney had a population of 1,208. The median age was 38.2 years. 25.0% of residents were under the age of 18 and 15.9% of residents were 65 years of age or older. For every 100 females there were 99.3 males, and for every 100 females age 18 and over there were 99.6 males age 18 and over.

There were 354 families residing in the village, and the population density was 1,920.51 inhabitants per square mile (741.51/km^{2}).

0.0% of residents lived in urban areas, while 100.0% lived in rural areas.

There were 489 households in Sidney, of which 33.5% had children under the age of 18 living in them. Of all households, 53.4% were married-couple households, 15.5% were households with a male householder and no spouse or partner present, and 21.1% were households with a female householder and no spouse or partner present. About 23.9% of all households were made up of individuals and 10.1% had someone living alone who was 65 years of age or older.

There were 517 housing units at an average density of 821.94 per square mile (317.35/km^{2}), of which 5.4% were vacant. The homeowner vacancy rate was 2.3% and the rental vacancy rate was 2.8%.

Racial composition as of the 2020 census
Race	Number	Percent
White	1,132	93.7%
Black or African American	4	0.3%
American Indian and Alaska Native	0	0.0%
Asian	5	0.4%
Native Hawaiian and Other Pacific Islander	0	0.0%
Some other race	9	0.7%
Two or more races	58	4.8%
Hispanic or Latino (of any race)	25	2.1%

=== Income and poverty ===
The median income for a household in the village was $76,250, and the median income for a family was $81,071. Males had a median income of $56,750 versus $43,333 for females. The per capita income for the village was $34,866. About 2.0% of families and 3.3% of the population were below the poverty line, including 3.6% of those under age 18 and none of those age 65 or over.

== Government ==
Sidney has a village president and board of trustees.

== Education ==
It is in the Tolono Community Unit School District 7.

== Notable people ==
- John Wilson Ruckman, Union Army General with distinction in the Civil War; born in Sidney
- Carolee Schneemann, American artist associated with the Fluxus movement
