= Vermilion County, Illinois =

County in Illinois, United States

- County
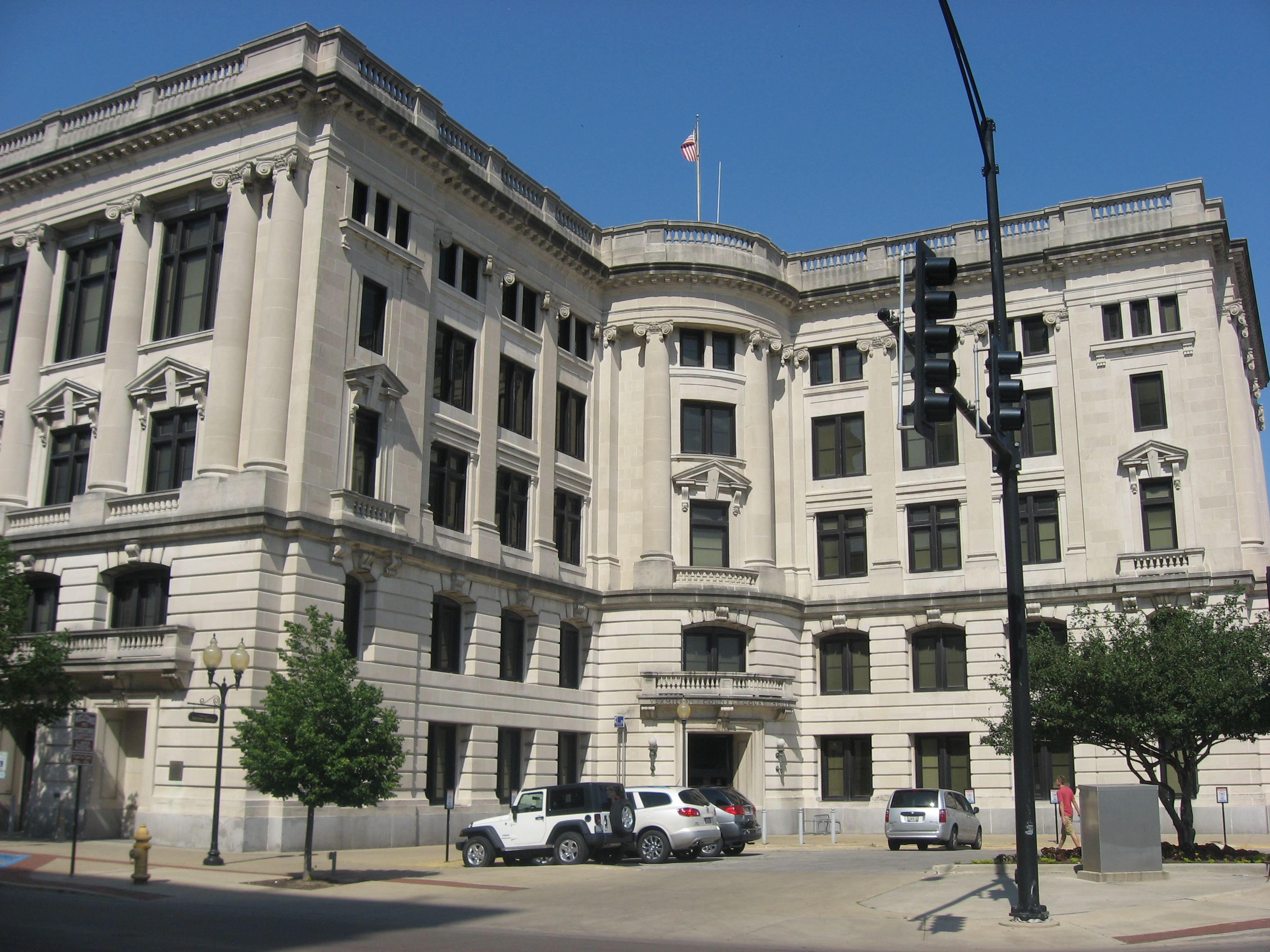
- Vermilion County Courthouse

- Seal

- Location within Illinois

- Illinois' location within the United States
- Coordinates: 40°07′28.13″N 87°37′48.07″W
- Country: United States
- State: Illinois
- Region: Central Illinois
- Metro area: Danville Micropolitan
- Incorporated: January 18, 1826
- Named for: Vermilion River
- County seat and largest city: Danville

Area
  - Total: 901.28 sq mi (2,334.3 km^{2})
  - Land: 898.37 sq mi (2,326.8 km^{2})
  - Water: 2.91 sq mi (7.5 km^{2})
  - Rank: 7th largest county in Illinois

Population (2020)
  - Total: 74,188
  - Estimate (2025): 71,259 ▼
  - Density: 82.581/sq mi (31.885/km^{2})
- Time zone: UTC−6 (Central)
  - Summer (DST): UTC−5 (Central)
- ZIP Code prefixes: 60932, 60942, 60960, 60963, 61810, 61811, 61812, 61814, 61817, 61831, 61832, 61833, 61834, 61841, 61844, 61846, 61848, 61849, 61850, 61857, 61858, 61859, 61862, 61865, 61870, 61876, 61883
- Area codes: 217/447
- Congressional district: 2nd, 15th
- Website: www.vercounty.org

Vermilion County is a county in the eastern part of the U.S. state of Illinois, between the Indiana border and Champaign County. It was established in 1826 and was the 45th of Illinois' 102 counties. According to the 2020 United States census, it had a population of 74,188. It contains 21 incorporated settlements; the county seat and largest city is Danville.

Vermilion County is part of the Danville, IL Micropolitan Statistical Area, as well as the larger Champaign–Urbana–Danville combined statistical area.

== History ==
Vermilion County is named after the Vermilion River, which passes through the county and empties into the Wabash River in Indiana near Cayuga; the river was so named because of the color of the earth along its route.

The area which became Vermilion County was under the flag of France from 1682 to 1763, as part of New France.

It was taken over by Great Britain for fifteen years after the French and Indian War; it then became part of the colonies after the Revolutionary War when the area was ceded to Virginia, titled "the Illinois County of Virginia". Later it was part of the Indiana Territory, then the Illinois Territory, and finally the state of Illinois. The county was created on January 18, 1826, from a portion of Edgar County. There was an unorganized territory to the north and west which was attached to the county; Champaign and Iroquois counties were formed from part of this territory in 1833. The remainder was used to create Ford County in 1859, the last Illinois county to be formed.

The county's saline springs were a strong attraction to early explorers; they were mentioned as early as 1801. Joseph Barron, an interpreter fluent in several Native American languages, stated in an affidavit that he was present at the "Vermilion Salines" that year. The production required 100 gallons of water for one bushel of salt and proved to be profitable from the first run (1822–1829), when salt became less expensive and the venture was no longer economical.

The area's first settlement was made in 1819 near these saline springs, by the Treat, Beckwith, and Whitcomb. James Butler, from Ohio, followed in 1820 and settled in the Catlin area; within a few years, the settlement grew to encompass several families and became known as "Butler's Point". In the southern part of the county, Henry Johnson built a cabin west of present-day Georgetown; this area was known as "Johnson's Point". The southern portion of the county was soon filled with small settlements. Most settlers in Vermilion County came from Kentucky, East Tennessee, Virginia, and Western North Carolina, and those settlers left the South as they were opposed to slavery.

Some of the early settlers were of the Religious Society of Friends, or Quakers. They founded the settlement of Vermilion Grove in the south part of the county, one of the county's first settlements and the site of the county's second public school.

The county has strong ties to Abraham Lincoln, who practiced law in Danville from 1841 to 1859 with Ward Hill Lamon; Lamon later served as Lincoln's bodyguard. Lincoln spoke in Danville during his 1858 campaign for a seat in the US Senate. Lincoln gave the speech in his stocking feet from the balcony of Dr. William Fithian, a prominent local physician. The Fithian home is now listed on the National Register of Historic Places and serves as the Vermilion County Museum; visitors can see Lincoln memorabilia including a bed in which Lincoln slept.

The various stages in the evolution of Vermilion County are shown below.

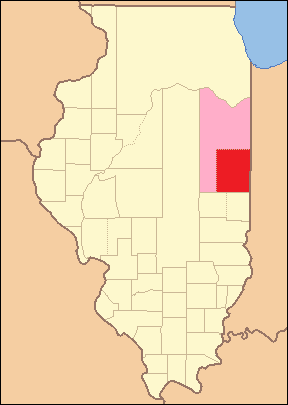
Vermilion County from the time of its creation to 1831, including a large tract of unorganized territory temporarily attached to it.

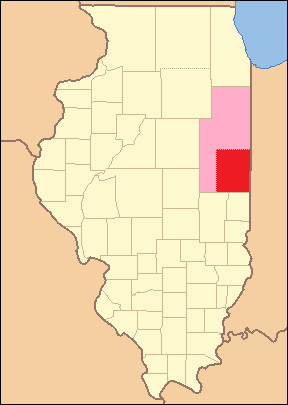
Vermilion between 1831 and 1833

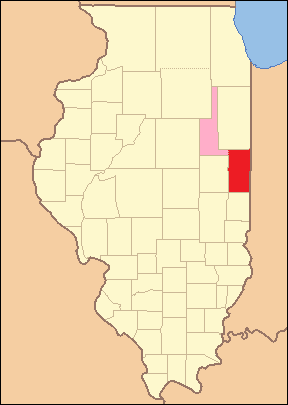
The county between 1833 and 1836, after creation of Champaign and Iroquois Counties

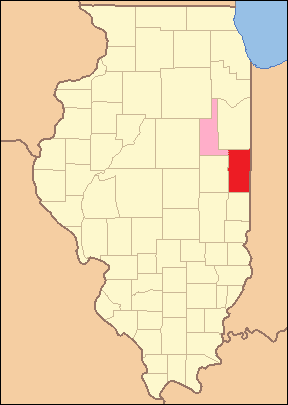
Vermilion County between 1836 and 1837

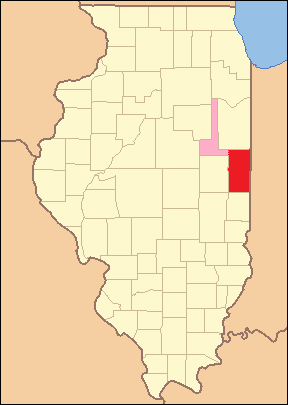
Vermilion County between 1837 and 1853

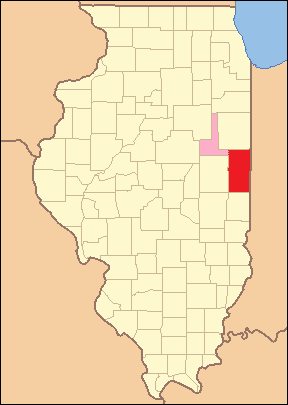
Vermilion County after 1853, when the unorganized territory was reduced to its current size.

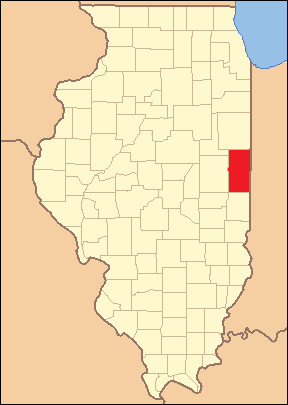
In 1859, the additional territory was split off as Ford County, reducing Vermilion to its current borders.

== Geography ==
Map of Vermilion County

Vermilion County is located along the eastern border of Illinois; its northern border is about 95 miles (153 km) south of Chicago.

Vermilion County in Illinois and Vermillion County in Indiana are two of twenty-two counties or parishes in the United States with the same name to border each other across state lines. According to the 2010 census, the county has a total area of 901.28 square miles (2,334.3 km^{2}), of which 898.37 square miles (2,326.8 km^{2}) (or 99.68%) is land and 2.91 square miles (7.5 km^{2}) (or 0.32%) is water. The land in Vermilion County consists mostly of various forms of silt loam. Lake Vermilion, a man-made 1,000-acre (400 ha) reservoir, is the county's largest body of water, located northwest of Danville. It provides the city's culinary water, and also provides recreation opportunities.

=== Adjacent counties ===
- Iroquois County – north
- Benton County, Indiana – northeast
- Warren County, Indiana – east
- Vermillion County, Indiana – southeast
- Edgar County – south
- Douglas County - southwest
- Champaign County – west
- Ford County – northwest

=== Cities ===
- Danville (county seat)
- Hoopeston
- Georgetown

=== Villages ===
- Allerton – at SW corner of county; extends into Champaign County
- Alvin – north of Danville
- Belgium – on Route 1
- Bismarck – north of Danville
- Catlin – southwest of Danville
- Fairmount – southwest of Danville
- Fithian – west of Danville on US 150
- Henning – north of Danville on US 136
- Indianola – southwest of Danville
- Muncie – west of Danville on US 150
- Oakwood – west of Danville on US 150
- Potomac – on US 136 north of Danville
- Rankin – at NW corner of county
- Ridge Farm
- Rossville – on Route 1, south of Hoopeston
- Sidell – east of Allerton
- Tilton
- Westville

=== Census-designated places ===
- East Lynn
- Olivet

=== Unincorporated communities ===
- Armstrong
- Batestown
- Cheneyville
- Collison
- Hegeler
- Hillery
- Hope
- Illiana
- Jamaica
- Jamesburg
- Midway
- Newtown
- Ryan
- Unionville

=== Previous settlements ===
Several towns were established in the county which no longer survive. In some cases, the coming of the railroads helped to define the best locations for settlements, and as a result some existing towns were abandoned. When Lake Vermilion was created, the town of Denmark was flooded and now lies at the bottom of the reservoir.

- Archie (south of Sidell)
- Blue Grass City
- Butler's Point (see Catlin)
- Conkeytown
- Denmark
- Ellis (Middlefork Township)
- Franklin (see Bismarck)
- Geneva
- Gilbert (see Alvin)
- Humrick
- Johnsonville (Blount Township)
- Munroe
- Myersville (see Bismarck)
- Pellsville (see Rankin)
- Prospect City
- Reilly (Butler Township)
- Shepherd's Town
- Watkins Grove (or Watkins Glen)
- Weaver City (see Ambia, Indiana)

=== Townships ===
Township government was adopted in Vermilion County on November 5, 1850, and eight townships were created:

- Carroll
- Danville
- Elwood
- Georgetown
- Middlefork
- Newell (first called Richland)
- Pilot
- Ross

Eleven additional townships were created in the following decades:

- Blount
- Butler
- Catlin
- Grant
- Jamaica
- Love
- McKendree
- Oakwood
- Sidell
- South Ross
- Vance

=== Parks ===
The Vermilion County Conservation District operates four parks:

- Forest Glen Preserve
- Heron County Park
- Kennekuk Cove County Park
- Lake Vermilion County Park

The Illinois Department of Natural Resources manages three areas in the county:

- Kickapoo State Recreation Area
- Harry "Babe" Woodyard State Natural Area
- Middle Fork State Fish and Wildlife Area

== Demographics ==
Historical population
Census	Pop.	Note	%±
1830	5,836		—
1840	9,303		59.4%
1850	11,492		23.5%
1860	19,800		72.3%
1870	30,388		53.5%
1880	41,588		36.9%
1890	49,905		20.0%
1900	65,635		31.5%
1910	77,996		18.8%
1920	86,162		10.5%
1930	89,339		3.7%
1940	86,791		−2.9%
1950	87,079		0.3%
1960	96,176		10.4%
1970	97,047		0.9%
1980	95,222		−1.9%
1990	88,257		−7.3%
2000	83,919		−4.9%
2010	81,625		−2.7%
2020	74,188		−9.1%
2025 (est.)	71,259	▼	−3.9%
US Decennial Census

=== 2020 census ===
As of the 2020 census, the county had a population of 74,188. The median age was 41.7 years. 22.9% of residents were under the age of 18 and 20.2% of residents were 65 years of age or older. For every 100 females there were 99.3 males, and for every 100 females age 18 and over there were 97.7 males age 18 and over.

The racial makeup of the county was 77.2% White, 14.0% Black or African American, 0.3% American Indian and Alaska Native, 0.8% Asian, <0.1% Native Hawaiian and Pacific Islander, 2.2% from some other race, and 5.4% from two or more races. Hispanic or Latino residents of any race comprised 5.1% of the population.

60.5% of residents lived in urban areas, while 39.5% lived in rural areas.

There were 30,568 households in the county, of which 28.3% had children under the age of 18 living in them. Of all households, 41.2% were married-couple households, 20.2% were households with a male householder and no spouse or partner present, and 30.7% were households with a female householder and no spouse or partner present. About 32.1% of all households were made up of individuals and 14.8% had someone living alone who was 65 years of age or older.

There were 34,407 housing units, of which 11.2% were vacant. Among occupied housing units, 67.8% were owner-occupied and 32.2% were renter-occupied. The homeowner vacancy rate was 2.3% and the rental vacancy rate was 10.8%.

=== Racial and ethnic composition ===
Vermilion County, Illinois – Racial and ethnic composition Note: the US Census treats Hispanic/Latino as an ethnic category. This table excludes Latinos from the racial categories and assigns them to a separate category. Hispanics/Latinos may be of any race.
Race / Ethnicity (NH = Non-Hispanic)	Pop 1980	Pop 1990	Pop 2000	Pop 2010	Pop 2020	% 1980	% 1990	% 2000	% 2010	% 2020
White alone (NH)	86,358	78,345	71,038	65,590	56,186	90.69%	88.77%	84.65%	80.36%	75.73%
Black or African American alone (NH)	6,723	7,799	8,802	10,394	10,247	7.06%	8.84%	10.49%	12.73%	13.81%
Native American or Alaska Native alone (NH)	129	149	161	138	140	0.14%	0.17%	0.19%	0.17%	0.19%
Asian alone (NH)	344	484	494	559	568	0.36%	0.55%	0.59%	0.68%	0.77%
Native Hawaiian or Pacific Islander alone (NH)	x	x	13	12	10	x	x	0.02%	0.01%	0.01%
Other race alone (NH)	318	75	74	52	249	0.33%	0.08%	0.09%	0.06%	0.34%
Mixed race or Multiracial (NH)	x	x	833	1,439	2,972	x	x	0.99%	1.76%	4.01%
Hispanic or Latino (any race)	1,350	1,405	2,504	3,441	3,816	1.42%	1.59%	2.98%	4.22%	5.14%
Total	95,222	88,257	83,919	81,625	74,188	100.00%	100.00%	100.00%	100.00%	100.00%

=== 2010 census ===
As of the 2010 United States census, there were 81,625 people, 32,655 households, and 21,392 families residing in the county. The population density was 90.9 inhabitants per square mile (35.1/km^{2}). There were 36,318 housing units at an average density of 40.4 per square mile (15.6/km^{2}). The racial makeup of the county was 82.5% white, 13.0% black or African American, 0.7% Asian, 0.2% American Indian, 1.5% from other races, and 2.2% from two or more races. Those of Hispanic or Latino origin made up 4.2% of the population. In terms of ancestry, 21.2% self-identified as American, 18.9% as German, 10.1% as Irish, and 9.1% as English.

Of the 32,655 households, 31.4% had children under the age of 18 living with them, 45.7% were married couples living together, 14.7% had a female householder with no husband present, 34.5% were non-families, and 29.8% of all households were made up of individuals. The average household size was 2.41 and the average family size was 2.96. The median age was 39.8 years.

The median income for a household in the county was $39,456 and the median income for a family was $49,429. Males had a median income of $40,107 versus $30,104 for females. The per capita income for the county was $20,218. About 14.6% of families and 18.7% of the population were below the poverty line, including 30.0% of those under age 18 and 9.1% of those age 65 or over.

== Climate and weather ==
Danville, Illinois

Climate chart (precipitation, max. and min. temperature)
J	F	M	A	M	J	J	A	S	O	N	D
2.1 34 17	2 40 22	3.2 52 32	3.9 65 41	4.5 75 51	4.7 84 60	4.4 86 64	3.9 84 63	3 78 55	3 67 43	3.5 52 34	2.8 39 23
- █ Average max. and min. temperatures in °F
- █ Precipitation totals in inches
- Source: The Weather Channel
Metric conversion
J	F	M	A	M	J	J	A	S	O	N	D
52 1 −8	51 4 −6	81 11 0	98 18 5	114 24 11	119 29 16	112 30 18	100 29 17	77 26 13	77 19 6	90 11 1	71 4 −5
- █ Average max. and min. temperatures in °C
- █ Precipitation totals in mm

Vermilion County is in the humid continental climate region of the United States along with most of Illinois. Its Köppen climate classification is Dfa, meaning that it is cold, has no dry season, and has a hot summer. In recent years, average temperatures in Danville have ranged from a low of 17 °F (−8 °C) in January to a high of 86 °F (30 °C) in July, although a record low of −26 °F (−32 °C) was recorded in January 1994 and a record high of 112 °F (44 °C) was recorded in July 1936. Average monthly precipitation ranged from 1.99 inches (51 mm) inches in February to 4.70 inches (119 mm) inches in June.

== Transportation ==
Danville Mass Transit provides public transit to the Danville area with buses.

- Interstate 74 enters Vermilion County from the west on its way from Champaign–Urbana, and passes just to the north of the towns of Fithian, Muncie and Oakwood before passing through the south edge of the Kickapoo State Park, the north edge of Tilton and the south edge of Danville. Continuing east, it leaves the county and the state on its way to Indianapolis.
- US Route 136, which runs across five states, passes into Vermilion County from the west on its way from Rantoul. It passes east through the towns of Armstrong, Potomac and Henning; it reaches Illinois Route 1 south of Rossville and then shares that highway's route as it passes south through Danville. At the south edge of Danville it reaches Main Street and resumes its eastward heading, leaving the east edge of Danville and passing out of the county and state on its way to Covington, Indiana.
- US Route 150 enters the county from Champaign–Urbana to the west, running just to the south of Interstate 74 and passing through the towns of Fithian, Muncie and Oakwood. Just west of Danville it crosses to the north side of Interstate 74 as that highway veers to the southeast. In downtown Danville, it meets Illinois Route 1 and U.S. Route 136, and follows Route 1 to the south and continues through the towns of Belgium, Westville, Georgetown and Ridge Farm before entering Edgar County further to the south.
- Illinois Route 1 runs from the north to the south through the county, passing through Hoopeston, Rossville, Danville, Belgium, Westville, Georgetown and Ridge Farm.
- Illinois Route 9 runs from west to east near the north edge of the county and passes through Rankin and Hoopeston; upon reaching the Indiana border
- Indiana State Road 26 continues its route to the east toward Lafayette, Indiana.
- Illinois Route 49 is a north–south highway near the western edge of the county. It passes south through Rankin where it intersects Route 9; further south it passes near Armstrong where U.S. Route 136 briefly shares its route. Crossing Interstate 74, it shares the route of U.S. Route 150, running west for about 2 miles (3.2 km) and leaving the county before continuing south in Champaign County.
- Illinois Route 119 is a short 8-mile (13 km) east–west road that connects the intersection of Illinois Route 1 and U.S. Route 136 with Indiana State Road 28 at the state line.

Four railroad lines pass through or into the county, all intersecting in the Danville area; this results in many different railroad crossings throughout the city:

- Norfolk Southern Railway line – enters the county from Decatur to the southwest and passes through Danville on its way to Lafayette, Indiana to the northeast
- CSX Transportation line - north-south through the county, connecting Chicago and Terre Haute, Indiana via Paris
- Kankakee, Beaverville and Southern Railroad line – north–south line through the county, to the east of the CSX line, a few miles from the state border, beginning in northern Iroquois County and running south through Danville, then veering east.
- Vermilion Valley Railroad line – a 6-mile (9.7 km) line that connects the Flex-N-Gate factory west of Covington, Indiana with CSX in Danville.

The Vermilion Regional Airport is located northeast of Danville.

== Economy ==
For 2014, Vermilion County had a workforce of 35,643 people; 32,584 were employed and 3,059 (8.6%) were unemployed.

== Education ==
There are 12 school districts in the county that provide primary and secondary education.

There are a total of 10 full K-12 school districts which have any amount of territory in the county, even if the schools and/or administration buildings are in other counties:

- Bismarck-Henning Consolidated Unit School District
- Danville Community Consolidated School District 118
- Georgetown–Ridge Farm Community Unit District 4
- Heritage Community Unit School District 8
- Hoopeston Area Community Unit School District 11
- Oakwood Community Unit School District 76
- Paxton-Buckley-Loda Community Unit School District 10
- Rossville-Alvin Community Unit School District 7
- Salt Fork Community Unit School District 512
- Westville Community Unit School District 2

Additionally, there are two high school districts: Armstrong Township High School District 225 and St. Joseph-Ogden Community High School District 305. There are also three elementary school districts: Armstrong-Ellis Consolidated School District 61, Potomac Community Unit School District 10, and Prairieview-Ogden Community Consolidated School District 197.

There are two post-secondary educational institutions: Danville Area Community College, a public two-year community college, and Lakeview College of Nursing, a four-year private institution (both located in Danville).

== Government ==
Based on the 2000 census, Vermilion County is part of the Illinois's 15th congressional district; the Illinois Senate districts 52 and 53; and the Illinois House of Representatives districts 104 and 105.

Each township has a supervisor. The township board consists of the supervisor and four members elected at large from the township.

The Vermilion County Board is controlled by Republicans. Larry Baughn (R) of Hoopeston serves as chairman. The Vermilion County Circuit Court is led by Judge Thomas O’Shaugnessy.

== Politics ==
United States presidential election results for Vermilion County, Illinois
Year	Republican		Democratic		Third party(ies)	
Year	No.	%	No.	%	No.	%
1892	6,892	55.44%	5,001	40.23%	539	4.34%
1896	8,767	59.14%	5,749	38.78%	309	2.08%
1900	9,852	59.10%	6,147	36.87%	672	4.03%
1904	11,179	66.65%	3,620	21.58%	1,973	11.76%
1908	11,726	60.62%	6,320	32.67%	1,298	6.71%
1912	5,655	32.25%	5,576	31.80%	6,302	35.94%
1916	16,330	50.25%	13,864	42.66%	2,302	7.08%
1920	18,175	61.74%	8,634	29.33%	2,630	8.93%
1924	17,822	54.64%	6,424	19.70%	8,369	25.66%
1928	21,616	62.26%	12,728	36.66%	373	1.07%
1932	15,643	38.46%	24,032	59.08%	1,002	2.46%
1936	18,350	41.56%	25,016	56.65%	790	1.79%
1940	23,059	49.87%	22,891	49.50%	292	0.63%
1944	20,794	52.70%	18,387	46.60%	273	0.69%
1948	18,994	53.29%	16,173	45.37%	479	1.34%
1952	25,367	57.36%	18,771	42.44%	88	0.20%
1956	26,534	59.51%	17,991	40.35%	60	0.13%
1960	26,571	57.34%	19,702	42.51%	69	0.15%
1964	19,506	44.06%	24,765	55.94%	0	0.00%
1968	21,391	49.26%	16,238	37.39%	5,795	13.35%
1972	24,863	63.06%	14,413	36.56%	149	0.38%
1976	19,751	51.24%	18,438	47.83%	357	0.93%
1980	22,579	57.07%	14,498	36.64%	2,490	6.29%
1984	22,932	57.89%	16,530	41.73%	149	0.38%
1988	16,943	48.32%	17,918	51.10%	206	0.59%
1992	11,703	30.43%	18,383	47.80%	8,375	21.78%
1996	12,015	38.35%	15,525	49.55%	3,789	12.09%
2000	15,783	49.17%	15,406	47.99%	911	2.84%
2004	18,731	55.56%	14,726	43.68%	257	0.76%
2008	16,054	48.62%	16,246	49.21%	716	2.17%
2012	16,892	55.57%	12,878	42.36%	630	2.07%
2016	19,087	61.93%	10,039	32.58%	1,692	5.49%
2020	20,725	65.50%	10,323	32.62%	594	1.88%
2024	19,777	66.70%	9,254	31.21%	620	2.09%

== See also ==
- Danville Area Community College
- Danville High School
- National Register of Historic Places listings in Vermilion County, Illinois
- Vermilion Regional Airport
