= Vermilion River (Wabash River tributary) =

River in the Midwestern United States

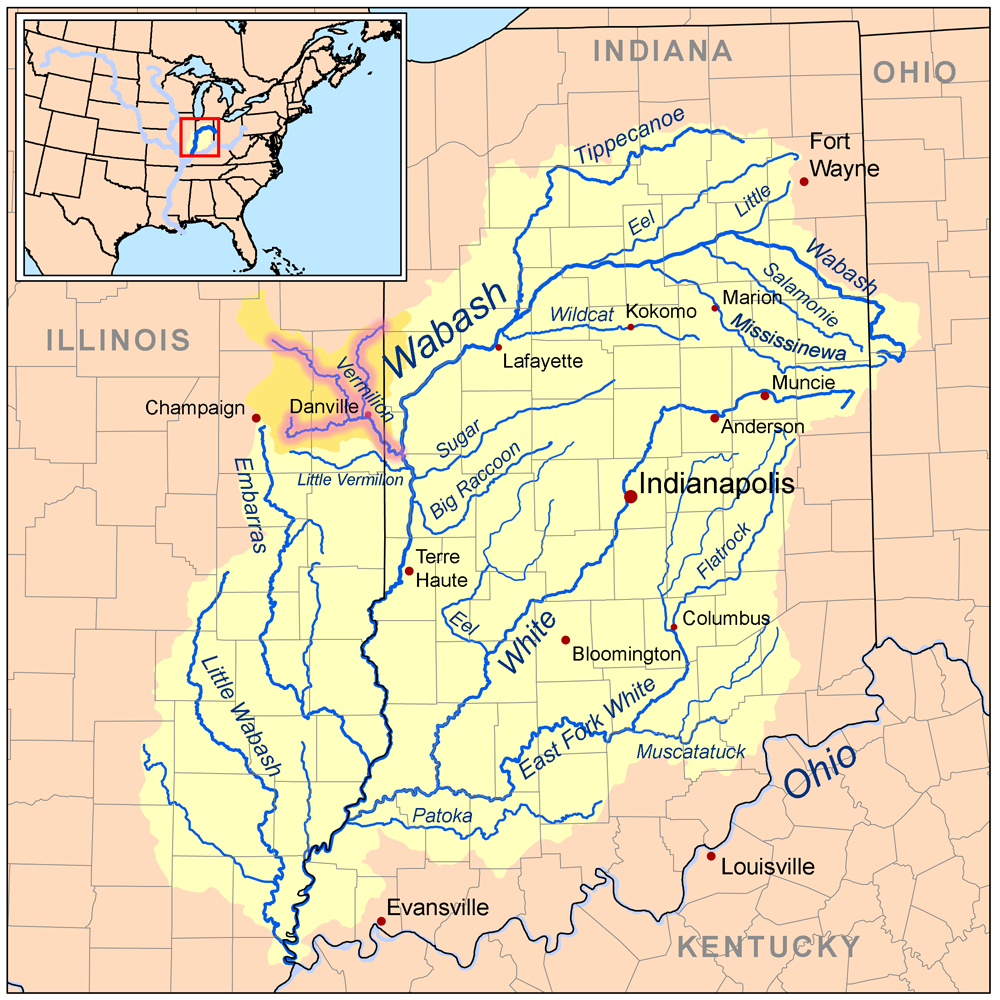
- Map of the Vermilion River (including the Salt, Middle, and North forks) highlighted within the Wabash River watershed.

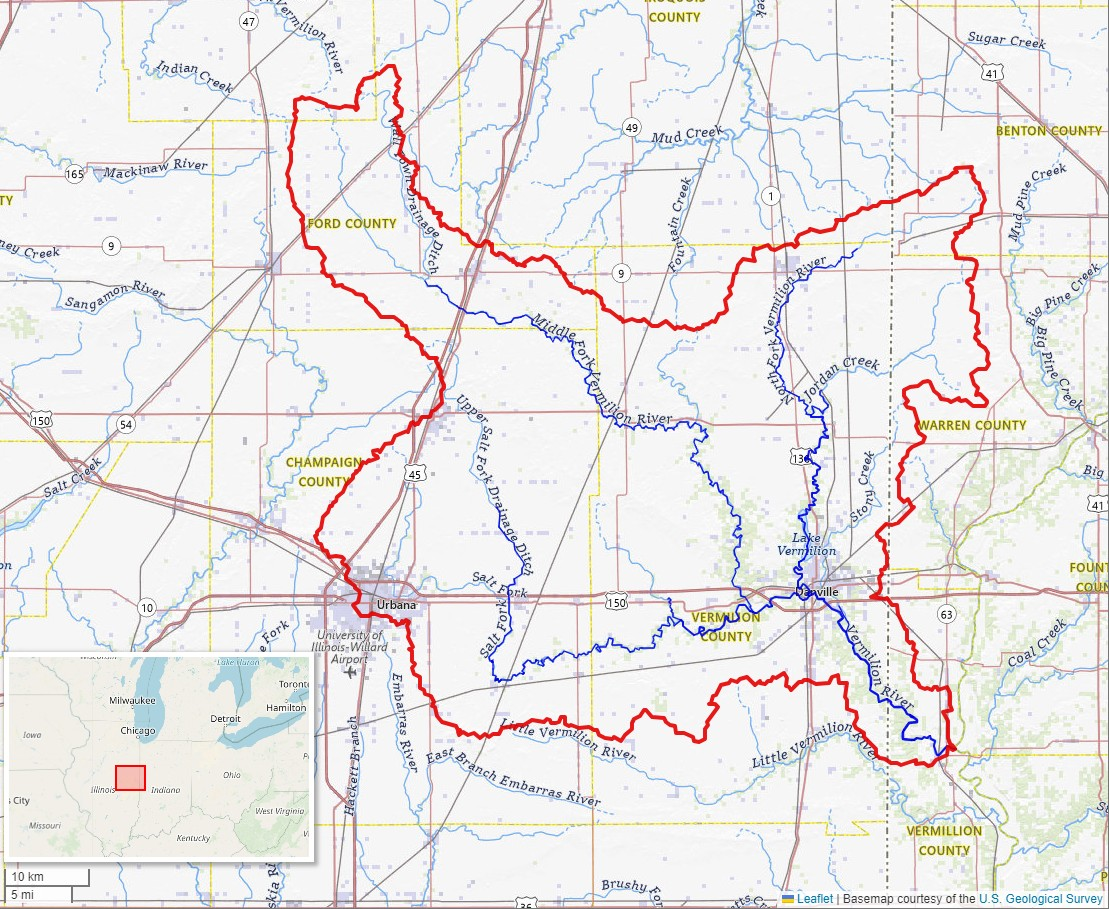
- Vermilion River watershed (Interactive map)
- Native name: Peeyankihšiaki Siipiiwi (Miami-Illinois)

Location
- Country: United States

Physical characteristics
- Source
  - location: Confluence of the Middle Fork and Salt Fork west of Danville, Illinois
  - coordinates: 40°06′13″N 87°43′01″W
- Mouth
  - location: Wabash River northeast of Cayuga, Indiana
  - coordinates: 39°57′31″N 87°26′24″W
  - elevation: 472 ft (144 m)
- Length: 28.4 miles (45.7 km)
- Discharge
  - location: Danville, Illinois
  - average: 1,078 cu/ft. per sec.

Basin features
- Progression: Vermilion River → Wabash → Ohio → Mississippi → Gulf of Mexico
- Tributaries
  - left: Middle Fork, North Fork
  - right: Salt Fork
- GNIS ID: 445248

The Vermilion River is a tributary of the Wabash River in the states of Illinois and Indiana, United States.

There are two "Vermilion Rivers" in Illinois. The Wabash tributary flows south, while the other Vermilion River flows north to the Illinois River. There are also two Little Vermilion rivers, one flowing into the Wabash River and one into the Illinois.

The north-flowing Vermilion River and the south-flowing Middle Fork Vermilion River lie along a straight line connecting Oglesby and Danville. The two rivers drain what was once an upland marsh near Roberts. The two rivers have been extended by drainage ditches so that they nearly connect at their headwaters. The rivers may share a common name because early settlers regarded them as a single river that flowed in two directions. The rivers may have served as a canoe route between the Illinois River and Wabash River, with a portage through the marshes near Roberts.

== Tributaries ==
The main tributaries of the Vermilion River join near Danville:

- Salt Fork Vermilion River
- Middle Fork Vermilion River
- North Fork Vermilion River

The Vermilion starts with the confluence of the Salt Fork and Middle Fork, to be joined by the North Fork approximately 5 miles (8 km) downstream.

The Salt Fork is the western tributary. It arises north of Urbana, flowing east toward Danville. It was named for the saline springs in its lower reaches. When settlers first arrived in the area, the saline springs were the basis of the dominant industry.

The Middle Fork arises near Roberts, and flows southeast toward Danville. The Middle Fork is notable as the only river in Illinois designated as a National Wild and Scenic River by United States National Park Service. This scenic stream flows through Kickapoo State Park near Danville and is a favorite of Illinois canoeists.

The North Fork arises in Indiana to the northeast of Hoopeston, Illinois. It flows south and southwest toward Danville.

From Danville, the Vermilion River flows to its confluence with the Wabash River to the east of the Illinois/Indiana border.

== Cities and counties ==
The following cities, towns and villages are among those in the Vermilion River watershed:

- Champaign, Illinois
- Danville, Illinois
- Homer, Illinois
- Hoopeston, Illinois
- Paxton, Illinois
- Rantoul, Illinois
- St. Joseph, Illinois
- Sidney, Illinois
- Urbana, Illinois
- Potomac, Illinois

Portions of the following counties are drained by the Vermilion River:

- Benton County, Indiana
- Champaign County, Illinois
- Ford County, Illinois
- Iroquois County, Illinois
- Vermilion County, Illinois
- Vermillion County, Indiana
- Warren County, Indiana

== See also ==
- List of Illinois rivers
- List of Indiana rivers
- Watersheds of Illinois
