= Timeline of Vermilion County, Illinois history =

This article is a timeline of Vermilion County, Illinois history.

== 19th century ==
=== 1800s ===
- 1809 – The Illinois Territory is formed.

=== 1810s ===
- 1818 December 3 – Illinois is admitted to the Union.
- 1819 November – Salt Springs becomes the first European settlement in what is to become Vermilion County.

=== 1820s ===
- 1826 January 18 – Vermilion County is created.
- 1826 March – The county is divided into two townships, Carroll in the south and Ripley in the north.
- 1826 – James Haworth plats the town of Georgetown.
- 1827 January – The Salt Works, on the Salt River the west of the mouth of the Middle Fork of the Vermilion River, is the first settlement. Lottie Jones VC History
- 1827 January 31 – The future site of Danville is identified as the new county seat.
- 1827 April 10 – Lots in the new town of Danville go on sale.
- 1827 May – Post office at Danville opens in the home of Amos Williams.
- 1828 – Post office at Georgetown opens.

=== 1830s ===
- 1833 – Champaign County is founded to the west, taking a strip ten miles wide from the west side of Vermilion County.
- 1833 – Iroquois County is founded to the north, and Vermilion County is extended by 6 miles on the north side.
- 1835 – Daniel Beckwith (after whom Danville was named) dies of pneumonia following a horseback ride from Washington.
- 1837 – The town of Franklin is founded near the future site of Bismarck, but only lasts a few years.
- 1838 September 17–20 – The Potawatomi Trail of Death camps at Sandusky Point near what became the town of Catlin.
- 1839 – Post office at the future site of Rossville opens.

=== 1840s ===
- 1843 – The town of Myersville is founded near the future site of Bismarck.

=== 1850s ===
- 1851 – Vermilion County is divided into eight townships: Danville, Georgetown, Elwood, Carroll, Ross, Middlefork, Newell (first called Richland), and Pilot.
- 1851 – B. E. Conkey founds Conkeytown.
- 1856 – Blount Township is created.
- 1857 – Mann's Chapel is constructed south of the future site of Rossville.
- 1858 – Catlin Township is created.
- 1858 – Abraham Lincoln gives a speech in Danville at the home of Dr. William Fithian (now the Vermilion County Museum) while campaigning for U.S. Senator against Stephen A. Douglas.
- 1859 – Ford County is created from an unorganized territory that had been attached to Vermilion County.

=== 1860s ===
- 1862 – Grant Township is created.
- 1862 – The town of Rossville is founded.
- 1864 – Butler Township is created.
- 1866 – Vance Township is created.
- 1866 – Josiah Hunt and Guy Merrill plat the town of Catlin.
- 1867 – Sidell Township is created.
- 1868 – Oakwood Township is created.

=== 1870s ===
- 1870 September – Danville High School is established.
- 1871 – The town of Hoopeston is founded.
- 1872 – Construction on the Pumpkin Vine Railroad begins, to carry coal from south of Covington, Indiana to the Bismarck area.
- 1872 – The town of Gilbert is founded south of the future site of Alvin.
- c. 1873 – The town of Bismarck is founded.
- 1873 – William P. and E. A. West lay out the town of Westville.
- 1875 – The town of Alvin is founded at a new railroad intersection just north of Gilbert, supplanting the earlier town.

=== 1880s ===
- 1883 – The Danville Public Library is formed.
- 1884 – The Grand Opera House (later the Fischer Theatre) opens.

=== 1890s ===
- 1894 – The Danville Training School for Nurses (later Lakeview College of Nursing) opens.
- 1897 – An Old Soldiers' Home is established on the southeast side of Danville.
- 1899 – Jamaica Township is created.

== 20th century ==
=== 1900s ===
- 1900 August 2 – Helen Morgan is born in Vermilion County.
- 1902 – Love Township is created.
- 1904 November 7 – Danville's Carnegie Library opens.
- 1905 January – Hoopeston's Carnegie Library is dedicated.

=== 1910s ===
- 1912 – McKendree Township is created.
- 1919 – The first Grab It Here grocery store opens.

=== 1920s ===
- 1924 – Danville High School moves to the current building.
- 1924 September 15 – Bobby Short is born in Danville.
- 1925 December 13 – Dick Van Dyke is born in West Plains, Missouri.
- 1927 – South Ross Township is created.

=== 1930s ===
- 1931 July 27 – Jerry Van Dyke is born in Danville.

=== 1940s ===
- 1942 March 16 – The town of Alvin is hit by a tornado at 11:40 AM, killing six people and causing much destruction.
- 1946 – The University of Illinois establishes an extension center at Danville High School.
- 1949 – The University of Illinois extension becomes Danville Community College.

=== 1950s ===
- 1950 January 21 – Joseph R. Tanner is born in Danville.
- 1951 – Danville Community College is renamed Danville Junior College.

=== 1960s ===
- 1965 – Danville Junior College moves to buildings acquired from the Veterans Administration at 2000 East Main Street.
- 1966 – Danville Junior College becomes an independent two-year college.

=== 1970s ===
- 1979 – Danville Junior College is renamed Danville Area Community College.

=== 1980s ===
- 1980 September 20 Danville's David S. Palmer Civic Center opens.
- 1988 – Lakeview College of Nursing becomes a separate entity when the hospital changes hands.

=== 1990s ===
- 1994 November 3 – Joe Tanner flies aboard Space Shuttle Atlantis on mission STS-66.
- 1995 November 7 – The new Danville Public Library building opens.
- 1997 February 11 – Joe Tanner flies aboard Space Shuttle Discovery on mission STS-82, performing two space walks.

== 21st century ==
=== 2000s ===
- 2000 November 30 – Joe Tanner flies aboard Space Shuttle Endeavour on mission STS-97, performing three space walks.
- 2004 February – Several historic buildings in downtown Rossville are destroyed by fire.
- 2005 March 21 – Bobby Short dies at the age of 80.
- 2006 August 26 – Chittick's Family Eye Care is destroyed by fire.
- 2006 September 9 – Joe Tanner flies aboard Space Shuttle Atlantis on mission STS-115, performing a space walk.

=== 2010s ===
- 2017 September 30, October 1 – Vermilion Regional Airport hosts its first air show since 1987.
- 2018 January 5 – Jerry Van Dyke dies at age 86.
