= List of cemeteries in Vermilion County, Illinois =

This list of cemeteries in Vermilion County, Illinois includes currently operating, historical (closed for new interments), and defunct (graves abandoned or removed) cemeteries, columbaria, and mausolea which are historical and/or notable. It does not include pet cemeteries.

Name	Coordinates	Township	GNIS ID	Notes
Adams Family Plot		McKendree		Located southeast of the intersection of 2080 E and 1200 N.
Allen Family Plot		Ross		Defunct. The original location is on a hill northeast of the intersection of 3050 N and 1730 E, which is just west of Alvin.
Allhands	40°08′14″N 87°43′34″W	Catlin	403440	Located at the east edge of Kickapoo State Park, this cemetery was dedicated in 1864 and deeded from Sylvester and Martha Hutton.
Atherton	40°06′27″N 87°35′35″W	Danville	403696	Located on the southeast edge of Danville and was started in 1858 on landed deeded by the grandfather of Paul Atherton. It is located on Lewis Road, to the south of New Atherton Cemetery (see below).
Bethel	39°53′59″N 87°32′24″W	Love	404274	About 6 miles east of Ridge Farm, this cemetery is surrounded by a fence and is still in use.
Bethel	40°13′29″N 87°43′35″W	Blount	404275	Located in the churchyard of the Free Methodist Church. Stones here date from the 1880s.
Bethel	40°19′50″N 87°37′13″W	Ross	404277	Formerly known as Wiseman Cemetery but began to be called after the nearby Bethel United Brethren Church. Located north of Alvin and east of Mann's Chapel.
Bock	40°01′47″N 87°34′04″W	McKendree	404641	Named for George Bock, a son-in-law of Achilles Morgan (the first settler at Brooks Point), this cemetery is located east of Westville.
Bodkin	40°04′38″N 87°55′15″W	Vance	404643	Located in the northwest corner of the township.
Brittingham Family Plot				Jeremiah Brittingham came to Vermilion County in 1830 from Ohio and died in the winter of 1831; due to the extreme cold, he could not be buried immediately. An Indian chief died shortly thereafter and his people asked that he be buried with Jeremiah.
Bryley	40°10′58″N 87°35′44″W	Newell	405078	Also known as Brierly and is northeast of Danville. It was named for Samuel Brierly and contains graves of early Newell Township settlers. William Adams, a Revolutionary War soldier, is buried here.
Caraway Family Plot		Georgetown	1951030	Located north of the grade school in Westville, established on land provided by Joshua and Charles Caraway, which they acquired in 1824.
Cline		Blount	1951173	Sometimes known as Milner Cemetery, it is next to Milner School.
Colliers		Love	1951031	Colliers Cemetery is also sometimes called Humrick Cemetery and is just south of the small town of Humrick.
Collison	40°13′28″N 87°47′56″W	Pilot	1951156	Located southeast of the town of Collison.
County Poor Farm		Catlin		Adjacent to the Songer Cemetery, this cemetery contains the graves of many residents of the Vermilion County Home.
Concord			1951032	
Cox Family Plot	40°08′05″N 87°44′16″W	Catlin	406688	Named for John Cox who was born in 1799, was a scout in the Black Hawk War, and settled in the Middle Fork area in 1829. It is within Kickapoo State Park.
Crown Hill	39°53′32″N 87°39′32″W	Elwood	406851	Located within Ridge Farm, in the south part of the town. It was established on land from the farm of Ira Grover Jones. It was originally a GAR cemetery; the town of Ridge Farm took over maintenance in 1918. Stones here date from 1891.
Dalbey			1951158	
Danville National	40°07′37″N 87°34′50″W	Danville	1823605	
Davis	40°02′55″N 87°51′32″W	Vance	406972	
Dodson	40°12′14″N 87°42′59″W	Blount	407278	
Dougherty	40°04′17″N 87°48′07″W	Catlin	406961	
Dukes	40°02′55″N 87°38′04″W	Georgetown	407474	
East Lynn	40°27′17″N 87°48′01″W	Butler	407673	
Elwood Church	39°57′46″N 87°35′56″W	McKendree	1951033	
Emberry Chaple	40°12′04″N 87°50′46″W	Pilot	407985	
Fairchild	40°13′01″N 87°42′41″W	Blount	408159	
Fairview	39°53′55″N 87°50′45″W	Sidell	408189	
Farmers Chapel	40°11′09″N 87°36′42″W	Newell	1951034	
Floral Hill cemetery			1951174	
Forest Park	39°58′29″N 87°37′28″W	Georgetown	408522	
Forse	40°03′35″N 87°34′07″W	Danville	408541	
Georgetown			1951038	
God's Acre	40°03′24″N 87°43′02″W	Catlin	409111	
Gordon	40°10′08″N 87°38′50″W	Newell	409196	
Greenview			1951050	
Greenwood	40°06′06″N 87°37′12″W	Danville	409458	
Greenwood			1951041	
Grimes			1951045	
Gundy	40°16′15″N 87°38′33″W	South Ross	409570	
Hickman	40°04′30″N 87°47′32″W	Catlin	410136	
Higginsville	40°14′36″N 87°46′16″W	Blount	410209	
Hooten	40°05′39″N 87°38′06″W	Danville	410499	
Huffman	40°13′41″N 87°34′23″W	Newell	410656	
Indian Paint			1951159	
Ingersoll	40°20′23″N 87°48′51″W	Middlefork	410892	
Johnson	40°12′32″N 87°40′02″W	Blount	411157	
Johnson Hill	40°09′30″N 87°45′02″W	Oakwood	411167	
Jones Family			1951053	
Jones Family			1951160	
Jones Grove	40°04′19″N 87°42′01″W	Catlin	411214	
Kight's			1951055	
Knight's Branch	40°15′14″N 87°49′38″W	Pilot	411578	
Lamb	40°09′55″N 87°34′08″W	Newell	411774	
Langley	40°04′43″N 87°34′11″W	Danville	411814	
Larson			1951058	
Lebanon	39°54′53″N 87°44′59″W	Carroll	411898	
Leonard	40°13′35″N 87°35′54″W	Newell	411952	
Lithuanian	40°01′17″N 87°38′02″W	Georgetown	412272	
Locket	40°01′56″N 87°35′10″W	McKendree	412470	
Lorance			1951162	
Lutheran	40°06′57″N 87°36′20″W	Danville	1719940	
Lynch	40°07′57″N 87°34′08″W	Danville	412759	
Makemson			1951163	
Mann's Chapel			1951062	
Martin Burial Grounds			1951164	
McGee			1951065	
McKendree	40°00′03″N 87°34′18″W	McKendree	413291	
Michael	39°55′56″N 87°43′15″W	Carroll	413472	
Michael			1951083	
Miller	40°22′03″N 87°36′30″W	Ross	413577	
Mount Vernon	40°03′55″N 87°47′03″W	Catlin	414092	
New Atherton			1951165	
New Salem	40°14′35″N 87°45′03″W	Blount	414458	
Newell Grove			1951166	
Niccum	40°02′54″N 87°32′40″W	McKendree	414507	
North Fork			1951167	
Oak Ridge	40°03′59″N 87°43′03″W	Catlin	414848	
Oakhill	40°06′51″N 87°42′51″W	Danville	414819	
Oakwood			1951095	
Old Collison			1951175	
Old Partlow	40°17′37″N 87°51′13″W	Middlefork	415422	
Old Sowdowsky			1951096	
Outton Family			1951168	
Parish	40°04′06″N 87°35′41″W	Danville	415379	
Partlow	40°18′01″N 87°52′37″W	Middlefork	1764494	
Pate	40°05′36″N 87°43′49″W	Catlin	415431	
Pellville	40°27′40″N 87°55′27″W	Butler	415518	
Pentecost	40°10′52″N 87°43′09″W	Blount	415534	
Pilot Grove	39°53′05″N 87°36′55″W	Elwood	415678	
Pleasant Grove	40°08′31″N 87°46′44″W	Oakwood	415780	
Pleasant Mount	39°58′10″N 87°39′57″W	Georgetown	1951097	
Porter	40°14′17″N 87°46′18″W	Blount	416045	
Potomac	40°18′06″N 87°47′20″W	Middlefork	1951098	
Potomac	40°18′06″N 87°47′21″W	Middlefork	1966087	
Prairie Chapel	40°22′46″N 87°45′35″W	Ross	416105	
Rankin	40°28′21″N 87°53′10″W	Butler	1764547	
Redtop	40°25′32″N 87°41′12″W	Grant	416467	
Rice	40°11′18″N 87°50′02″W	Pilot	416583	
Rose	40°15′19″N 87°35′52″W	Newell	416935	
Rossville			1951099	
Ruckman			1951100	
Saint Patrick's	40°06′45″N 87°36′25″W	Danville	417664	
Saints Peter and Paul	40°02′15″N 87°37′34″W	Georgetown	417853	
Sanhill	40°06′22″N 87°35′37″W	Danville	418006	
Sandusky	39°57′33″N 87°42′42″W	Carroll	417981	
Sandusky	40°02′12″N 87°36′15″W	Georgetown	417982	
Searl			1951170	
Sharon	39°56′57″N 87°37′54″W	Elwood	418288	
Shock			1951171	
Snider	40°09′15″N 87°42′57″W	Blount	418688	
Songer	40°06′02″N 87°39′58″W	Catlin	418706	
Spicer Family Plot			1951172	
Springhill	40°08′45″N 87°37′26″W	Newell	418964	
Stearns	40°07′35″N 87°51′37″W	Oakwood	419082	
Stump	40°11′49″N 87°46′00″W	Pilot	419237	
Stunkard	39°54′35″N 87°47′38″W	Carroll	419242	
Sunset Memorial	40°11′57″N 87°37′42″W	Newell	1951101	
Thurman	40°12′42″N 87°39′37″W	Blount	419707	
Trimmell	40°10′41″N 87°46′13″W	Pilot	419845	
Underwood Family			1951142	
Vermilion	39°55′23″N 87°39′20″W	Elwood	1951145	
Wallace Chapel	40°20′08″N 87°49′12″W	Middlefork	1764516	
Walnut Corner	40°13′18″N 87°33′17″W	Newell	1951149	
Watson			1951153	
Weaver	39°56′43″N 87°42′48″W	Carroll	420673	
Whitlock	39°56′30″N 87°32′42″W	Love	421108	
Woodlawn	39°56′20″N 87°44′56″W	Carroll	421456	
Workheiser			1951154	
Wright Family	40°05′57″N 87°41′27″W	Catlin	1951155	
Yankee Point	39°55′29″N 87°35′22″W	Love	421556	

== See also ==
- List of cemeteries in the United States
- List of cemeteries in Ogle County, Illinois
- List of cemeteries in Illinois
