= Illinois Route 119 =

State highway in Vermilion County, Illinois, United States

Illinois Route 119
- IL 119 highlighted in red

Route information
- Maintained by IDOT
- Length: 7.78 mi (12.52 km)
- Existed: 1924–present

Major junctions
- West end: US 136 / IL 1 in Alvin
- East end: SR 28 in Alvin

Location
- Country: United States
- State: Illinois
- Counties: Vermilion

Highway system
- Illinois State Highway System; Interstate; US; State; Tollways; Scenic
← IL 117	→ IL 120

Illinois Route 119 (IL 119) is a 7.78-mile-long (12.52 km) east–west state route in east-central Illinois. It runs from the intersection of U.S. Route 136 and Illinois Route 1 east of Henning to State Road 28 at the Indiana state line, well west of Williamsport, Indiana.

== Route description ==
IL 119 begins at an intersection with US 136 and IL 1 in rural South Ross Township east of Henning. The highway heads east through farmland and crosses the North Fork Vermilion River. South of Alvan, the road turns southward, paralleling a CSX Transportation line. The highway then turns east, passing through farmland until its eastern terminus at the Indiana state line, where it continues toward Williamsport as Indiana State Road 28. It is an undivided, two-lane surface road for its entire length.

== History ==
SBI Route 119 originally traveled from Heyworth (at the present-day intersection of US 51 and US 136) to the Indiana state line using US 136 and IL 119. In 1937, it replaced IL 119A and IL 122 west to Havana at the Illinois River. In 1951, however, US 136 was established across the state of Illinois. US 136 took over all of IL 119 west of IL 1, leaving the short route to Indiana.

== Major intersections ==
The entire route is in South Ross Township, Vermilion County.

mi	km	Destinations	Notes
0.0	0.0	US 136 / IL 1	
7.8	12.6	SR 28	
1.000 mi = 1.609 km; 1.000 km = 0.621 mi
