= Rankin, Illinois =

Rankin
- Village (United States)
- Location of Rankin in Vermilion County, Illinois.

- Rankin's location in Vermilion County
- Coordinates: 40°27′52″N 87°53′45″W
- Country: United States
- State: Illinois
- County: Vermilion
- Township: Butler

Area
  - Total: 0.58 sq mi (1.50 km^{2})
  - Land: 0.58 sq mi (1.50 km^{2})
  - Water: 0 sq mi (0.00 km^{2})
- Elevation: 722 ft (220 m)

Population (2020)
  - Total: 495
  - Density: 855.0/sq mi (330.13/km^{2})
- Time zone: UTC-6 (CST)
  - Summer (DST): UTC-5 (CDT)
- ZIP code: 60960
- Area code: 217
- FIPS code: 17-62744
- GNIS ID: 2399040

Rankin is a village in Butler Township, Vermilion County, Illinois, United States. It is part of the Danville, Illinois Metropolitan Statistical Area. The population was 495 at the 2020 census, down 11.8% from 561 at the 2010 census.

== History ==
This town was named after W. A. Rankin, a wealthy landowner in the area. In 1872, there was a dispute between him and W. H. Pells (who was on the board of directors of the Lake Erie and Western Railroad) over the location of a railroad station. Ultimately, over the course of several years, Rankin won out over Pellsville, which was located a mile and a half to the west. There were railroad maintenance shops in Rankin until 1932 when they were moved to Frankfort, Indiana, and some of the residents of Rankin followed.

In 1972 the town celebrated its centennial, and a small commemorative volume was issued with brief articles on many of the town's families.

== Geography ==
According to the 2010 census, Rankin has a total area of 0.58 square miles (1.50 km^{2}), all land.

== Demographics ==
Historical population
Census	Pop.	Note	%±
1880	258		—
1890	314		21.7%
1900	754		140.1%
1910	858		13.8%
1920	944		10.0%
1930	840		−11.0%
1940	781		−7.0%
1950	737		−5.6%
1960	761		3.3%
1970	727		−4.5%
1980	727		0.0%
1990	619		−14.9%
2000	617		−0.3%
2010	561		−9.1%
2020	495		−11.8%
U.S. Decennial Census

As of the census of 2000, there were 617 people, 247 households, and 162 families residing in the village. The population density was 1,078.3 inhabitants per square mile (416.3/km^{2}). There were 282 housing units at an average density of 492.8 per square mile (190.3/km^{2}). The racial makeup of the village was 93.52% White, 0.16% African American, 0.49% Native American, 0.49% Asian, 4.86% from other races, and 0.49% from two or more races. Hispanic or Latino of any race were 6.16% of the population.

There were 247 households, out of which 27.9% had children under the age of 18 living with them, 51.8% were married couples living together, 8.9% had a female householder with no husband present, and 34.4% were non-families. 30.0% of all households were made up of individuals, and 15.8% had someone living alone who was 65 years of age or older. The average household size was 2.50 and the average family size was 3.09.

In the village, the population was spread out, with 27.9% under the age of 18, 6.0% from 18 to 24, 27.1% from 25 to 44, 21.1% from 45 to 64, and 18.0% who were 65 years of age or older. The median age was 37 years. For every 100 females, there were 102.3 males. For every 100 females age 18 and over, there were 96.0 males.

The median income for a household in the village was $29,063, and the median income for a family was $35,234. Males had a median income of $30,446 versus $22,188 for females. The per capita income for the village was $14,005. About 9.2% of families and 13.6% of the population were below the poverty line, including 11.5% of those under age 18 and 11.2% of those age 65 or over.

== Education ==
It is in the Hoopeston Area Community Unit School District 11.Students in the village, however, need to go to Hoopeston.
