= Illiana, Illinois =

Illiana
- Unincorporated community
- Vermilion County's location in Illinois

- Illiana's location in Vermilion County
- Coordinates: 40°11′47″N 87°31′55″W
- Country: United States
- State: Illinois
- County: Vermilion County
- Township: Newell Township
- Elevation: 722 ft (220 m)
- ZIP code: 61814
- Area code: 217
- GNIS feature ID: 0410753

Illiana is an unincorporated community in Newell Township, Vermilion County, Illinois, United States. In this area, State Line Road runs along the border between Illinois and Indiana; Illiana is just across the road from the town of State Line City in Warren County in Indiana. The name is a portmanteau of Illinois and Indiana.
