= Bonner Fellers =

United States Army general (1896–1973)

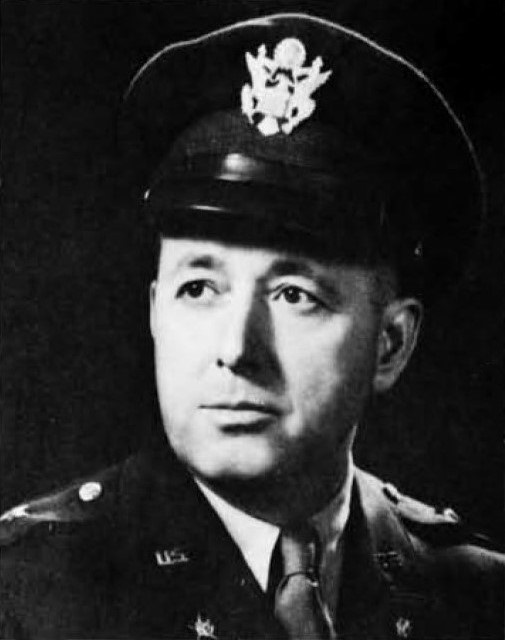
- Born: Bonner Frank Fellers; February 7, 1896; Ridge Farm, Illinois, United States
- Died: October 7, 1973 (aged 77); Washington, D.C., United States
- Military career
- Allegiance: United States
- Branch: United States Army
- Service years: 1918–1946
- Rank: Brigadier General
- Service number: 0-12134
- Units: Coast Artillery Corps
- Conflicts: World War I World War II
- Awards: Army Distinguished Service Medal (2); Legion of Merit

Brigadier General Bonner Frank Fellers (February 7, 1896 – October 7, 1973) was a United States Army officer who served during World War II as a military attaché and director of psychological warfare. From 1943 to 1946, he served on General Douglas MacArthur's staff as military secretary and as head of the psychological warfare drive against Japanese combat troops. He is notable as the military attaché in Egypt whose extensive transmissions of detailed British tactical information were unknowingly intercepted by Axis agents and passed to Nazi German Generalfeldmarschall Erwin Rommel for over six months, which contributed to disastrous British defeats at Gazala and Tobruk in June 1942. After the war, he played a leading role in efforts to exonerate Hirohito and members of the Japanese Imperial Family from war crimes during the Tokyo Tribunal.

== Early military career ==
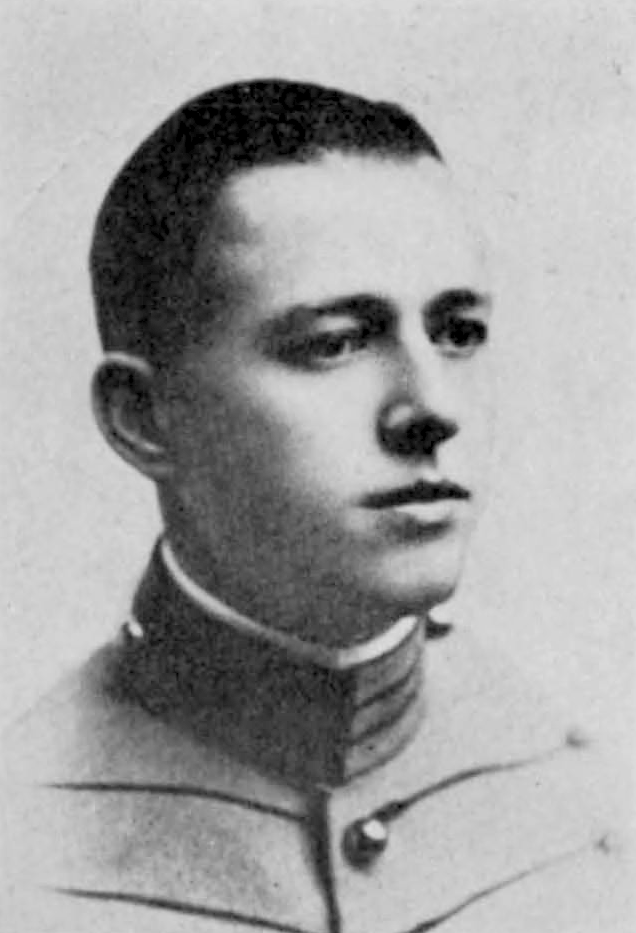
At West Point in 1918

Bonner Frank Fellers was born in Ridge Farm, Illinois, on February 7, 1896. He studied at Earlham College until he was appointed to the United States Military Academy at West Point, New York, by the Speaker of the House, Joe Cannon. He entered the Military Academy in June 1916, ten months before the American entry into World War I. The increased need for junior officers during World War I caused Fellers's class to be accelerated and to graduate on November 1, 1918, ten days before the armistice with the German Reich which ended the war. Upon his graduation, Fellers was commissioned as a second lieutenant in the United States Army Coast Artillery Corps.

After the usual post-graduation leave, Fellers attended the Coast Artillery School at Fort Monroe, Virginia, from December 1, 1918, to June 7, 1919. He was then sent to Europe to tour the World War I battlefields in France. He was one of several officers assigned to the 1919 American-Polish Typhus Relief Expedition. He embarked to return to the United States on September 18, 1919, and returned to the Coast Artillery School on November 14. He was promoted to first lieutenant on October 1, 1919 and graduated from the Coast Artillery School Basic Course on September 1, 1920. Fellers served with the 44th Coast Artillery at Camp Jackson, South Carolina, until October 1, 1920, and then with the headquarters of the I Corps Area in Boston, Massachusetts, from October 1920, to May 1921. A tour of duty in the Philippines, where he was stationed on Corregidor.

Fellers returned to I Corps Area headquarters in October 1923 and remained there until August 1924, when he received orders to join the Mathematics faculty at West Point. He managed to get his orders changed to an assignment in the English department instead. While there he married Dorothy Ross Dysart in 1925. They had a daughter, Nancy. This was followed, in 1929, by a second tour of duty in the Philippines, as a battery officer stationed at Fort Mills, from October 4, 1929 to August 21, 1931. He then went to Fort Totten, New York, where he was a battery officer and regimental adjutant with the 62nd Coast Artillery until July 28, 1933. The drastic reduction in the size of the army after the war created limited opportunities for promotion, so Fellers was not promoted to captain until December 3, 1934. In 1935, he graduated from the Command and General Staff School, where he wrote a paper on "The Psychology of the Japanese Soldier", and the Chemical Warfare Service Field Officers Course at Edgewood Arsenal. Later scholarship has identified the paper as an early example of Fellers's sustained interest in Japanese military psychology. Historian Patrick Porter described it as a prescient study that anticipated Japanese special-attack methods and reflected the intellectual foundation of Fellers's later psychological warfare work in the Pacific.

During his third tour of duty in the Philippines from September 18, 1935, to February 12, 1939, Fellers served on the staff of the military adviser to the Philippine Commonwealth to Apr. 30, 1938; including assignment to the Office of the Military Advisor to the Commonwealth Government of the Philippines, under General Douglas MacArthur; while there, Captain Fellers interacted with Major Dwight D. Eisenhower, a senior member of MacArthur's staff. Eisenhower, however, found him “bitter, sarcastic and nearly intolerable” His assignments included helping to open the Philippine Military Academy, the Philippines' "West Point," and liaising with Philippine President Manuel Quezon. He accompanied MacArthur and Quezon on their visit to Washington in early 1937, where they met with President Franklin Roosevelt. Fellers wrote to his wife that reports of corruption had reached Roosevelt, who was impatient with Quezon's demands for independence, but that MacArthur managed to assuage him.

The Philippines awarded him its Distinguished Service Star for his contributions to its defenses. His citation read:

For outstanding service to the Commonwealth of the Philippines, in positions of responsibility and importance, there is hereby awarded to Capt. Bonner F. Fellers, C.A.C., U.S.A., the Distinguished Service Star of the Philippines. As the first Commandant of the Reserve Officers Service School of the Philippine Army, his services have been characterized by unusual and noteworthy efficiency and professional attainment. In the discharge of his duties as Liaison Officer he has shown tact and good judgment and a high order of ability professionally. His accomplishments in these important positions have been of great benefit to the Commonwealth Government and a source of gratification to the Commander-in-Chief.

Fellers graduated from the Army War College on June 21, 1939. He then served as an assistant professor of English at West Point from July 5, 1939, to August 1940 and was promoted to major on July 1, 1940. He was promoted to lieutenant colonel in the wartime Army of the United States (as opposed to his substantive rank of major in the Regular Army) on September 15, 1941, and to colonel the following month. Before the United States joined World War II, Fellers was a member of the America First Committee.

== World War II ==
=== Italian and German access to Fellers's reports ===
In October 1940, Major Fellers was assigned as military attaché to the US embassy in Egypt. He was assigned the duty of monitoring and reporting on British military operations in the Mediterranean and Middle East Theatre. The British granted Fellers access to their activities and information. He dutifully reported everything he learned to his superiors in the United States, where his reports were read by President Franklin D. Roosevelt, and the G-2 section of the War Department General Staff.

Fellers was concerned about the security of the State Department's "Black Code", used when he sent his reports by radiogram. His concerns were overridden. Fellers was right to be concerned, as the details of the code had been stolen from the US embassy in Italy in September 1941 in a covert night raid into the embassy by Italian spies from the Servizio Informazioni Militare (SIM), the Italian military intelligence service. This enabled the Italians to read the reports, and within eight hours, the most secret data on British "strengths, positions, losses, reinforcements, supply, situation, plans, morale, etc" would be in the hands of the German and the Italian military. Around the same time, the Black Code was also broken by German cryptanalysts. The Germans could read Fellers's reports, starting just before the American entry into World War II and lasting until June 29, 1942, when Fellers switched to a newly adopted US code system.

Fellers's deciphered radiograms provided the Axis with detailed, extensive, and timely information about troop movements and equipment. Information from his messages alerted the Axis to British convoy operations in the Battle of the Mediterranean, including efforts to resupply the garrison of Malta. In January 1942 information about numbers and the condition of British forces was provided to Generalleutnant Erwin Rommel (Generalfeldmarschall from May onwards), the German commander in Africa, who could thus plan his operations with reliable knowledge of what the opposing forces were. The Germans referred to Fellers as die gute Quelle ("the good source"). Rommel referred to him as "the little fellow."

The deciphered code cost the Allies many lives. For example, in June 1942, the British attempted to resupply Malta, which was under constant air attack and was being starved. The British determined to sail two supply convoys simultaneously in the hopes that if one were to become discovered, attacks upon it would distract the Axis from the other. Codenamed Operation Vigorous and Harpoon, sailing from Alexandria in the east and Gibraltar in the west, respectively, their sailing was timed with an effort by special forces teams to neutralize Axis ships and aircraft. Fellers efficiently reported all of that in his cable, No. 11119 dated June 11, which was intercepted in both Rome and by the German Military High Command Cipher Branch (OKW Chiffrierabteilung). It read, in part:

NIGHTS OF JUNE 12TH JUNE 13TH BRITISH SABOTAGE UNITS PLAN SIMULTANEOUS STICKER BOMB ATTACKS AGAINST AIRCRAFT ON 9 AXIS AIRDROMES. PLANS TO REACH OBJECTIVES BY PARACHUTES AND LONG RANGE DESERT PATROL.

British and Free French raiders went into action behind the lines in Libya and on the island of Crete. In most of the attacks, the raiders were met with accurate fire from the alerted garrisons and suffered heavy losses, but failed to inflict any damage upon the Luftwaffe. Their only success came when Fellers's unwitting early warnings were not received or were ignored or ineptly handled. Meanwhile, both convoys were located and came under attack. A day after leaving Gibraltar, Convoy Harpoon's six merchant ships and their escorts came under continuous air and surface attack. Only two of the merchant ships survived to reach Malta. Convoy Vigorous was the larger effort. Made up of 11 merchant ships, it suffered such serious losses that it was forced to turn back to Egypt.

Ultra intercepts seen only by the British indicated the Germans were gaining information from a source in Egypt, and British intelligence had considered Fellers as a possible source. On June 10, 1942, the British became convinced Fellers's reports were compromised because an intercept had compared British tactics negatively to American tactics. The British informed the Americans on June 12, who, on June 14, confirmed the finding that Fellers's reports were the source. Fellers switched codes on June 29, which ended the leaks.

Fellers was not found at fault for the interception of his reports, but he was transferred from Egypt on July 7, 1942. His successor as attaché used the US military cipher, which the Germans could not read. Upon returning to the United States, Fellers was decorated with the Distinguished Service Medal for "his "uncanny ability to foresee military development" in the Middle East and the "clarity, brevity, and accuracy" of his dispatches. He was also promoted to brigadier general, the first member of his West Point Class of November 1918 to be so elevated, on December 4, 1942.

While assigned to the Office of Strategic Services (OSS) in Washington, he was, as recalled by a colleague, "the most violent Anglophobe I have encountered." However, that comment may be colored by the context of the American-British intelligence situation of the time. Fellers's North African reports, which his Distinguished Service Medal citation characterized as "models of clarity and accuracy," were bluntly critical of British weapons, operations, and leadership: "The Eighth Army has failed to maintain the morale of its troops; its tactical conceptions were always wrong, it neglected completely cooperation between the various arms; its reactions to the lightning changes in the battlefield were always slow." Such assessments, meant for American officials, were deciphered by the Germans, then intercepted from the Germans by the British Ultra signals intelligence.

Despite his anti-British attitude, Fellers and his reports influenced decisions to bring American supplies and troops to aid the British in North Africa. Throughout his tenure in North Africa, Fellers advocated for increased American support for the British in the region, which included both weapons and a commitment of American troops. This was at odds with the Joint Chiefs of Staff and the U.S. European Command as to the level of weapons support and an American troop landing. The military policy then was that saving the British in North Africa was not strategically required, especially not through a North Africa invasion (Operation Torch), which would divert focus from Operation Bolero, a plan for an early European invasion.

President Roosevelt admired Fellers's reports and was influenced by them enough so that on June 29, General George C. Marshall wrote to Roosevelt, "Fellers is a very valuable observer but, his responsibilities are not those of a strategist and his views are in opposition to mine and those of the entire Operations Division." The President invited Fellers to the White House upon his return from Cairo, and they met on July 30, 1942. "Consistent with his previous reporting through 1942, Fellers argued for robust and expeditious reinforcement of British forces in the Middle East." Thus, Fellers's blunt criticism and his analysis of the Middle East's strategic importance may well have influenced Roosevelt's decisions to reinforce the Eighth Army and to support Operation Torch.

=== Transfer to Pacific ===
Returning to the United States, Fellers gave lectures on desert warfare. In January 1943, he joined the planning group of the OSS in Washington, D.C., where he had played a role in planning psychological warfare. In August 1943, he went to the Southwest Pacific Area, where once again he served under MacArthur as a military secretary and the Chief of Psychological Operations of United States Army Forces in the Far East. During the liberation of the Philippines from the Japanese, he had several assignments, including Director of Civil Affairs for the Philippines. For his services, Fellers received a second Philippine Distinguished Service Star. He also received the Legion of Merit and an oak leaf cluster to his Distinguished Service Medal.

=== Psychological warfare against Japan ===
After joining MacArthur's staff in the Southwest Pacific Area, Fellers became one of the principal American officers involved in psychological warfare against Japanese forces. The Hoover Institution describes him as MacArthur's military secretary and head of the psychological warfare drive against Japanese combat troops from 1943 to 1946. Under his leadership, the Psychological Warfare Branch used leaflets, newspapers, radio, loudspeakers, and motion pictures as part of the campaign against Japan.

In April 1944, Fellers devised the psychological warfare effort connected with the Hollandia operation in New Guinea, which Hoover Institution analysis describes as forming a core of later U.S. Army psychological operations against Japanese forces. In June 1944, the Southwest Pacific Area created a Psychological Warfare Branch to coordinate the theater psychological warfare campaign and provide intelligence support to headquarters and field units. Led by Fellers, the branch planned the production and dissemination of leaflets and other printed material intended to demoralize Japanese soldiers and encourage surrender or desertion.

In May 1945, Fellers signed the Basic Military Plan for Psychological Warfare Against Japan, a theater-level plan that sought to weaken Japan's will to resist by undermining civil and military morale, placing responsibility for the war on the Japanese military clique, and encouraging the Japanese people, when conditions were favorable, to overthrow the military government and seek peace. The plan treated Japanese psychological vulnerabilities, including attachment to home and family, face-saving, self-destruction, and emperor worship, as factors to be considered in surrender messaging.

The branch's guidance emphasized attacking the Japanese military clique rather than the Japanese people as a whole. Planning guidance signed by Fellers instructed propagandists to ridicule the military clique, avoid humiliating the Japanese people, avoid direct attacks on the Emperor, use pictorial material where possible, and always present the Japanese audience with a "way out." The same planning framework treated the Emperor's authority as a central factor in any surrender strategy.

Fellers also chaired the Conference on Psychological Warfare Against Japan, held in Manila on 7–8 May 1945. The conference brought together representatives from the China Theater, India-Burma Theater, Office of War Information, Seventh Fleet, Seventh Amphibious Force, Sixth Army, Eighth Army, Tenth Army, and the Psychological Warfare Branch, Southwest Pacific Area. In his opening remarks, Fellers told the conference that MacArthur had placed psychological warfare activities directly under his personal direction.

Historian Patrick Porter has argued that American psychological warfare in the Pacific combined increasingly sophisticated battlefield analysis with broader assumptions and myths about Japanese society, including ideas about the military elite and the Emperor.

== Post-war Japan ==
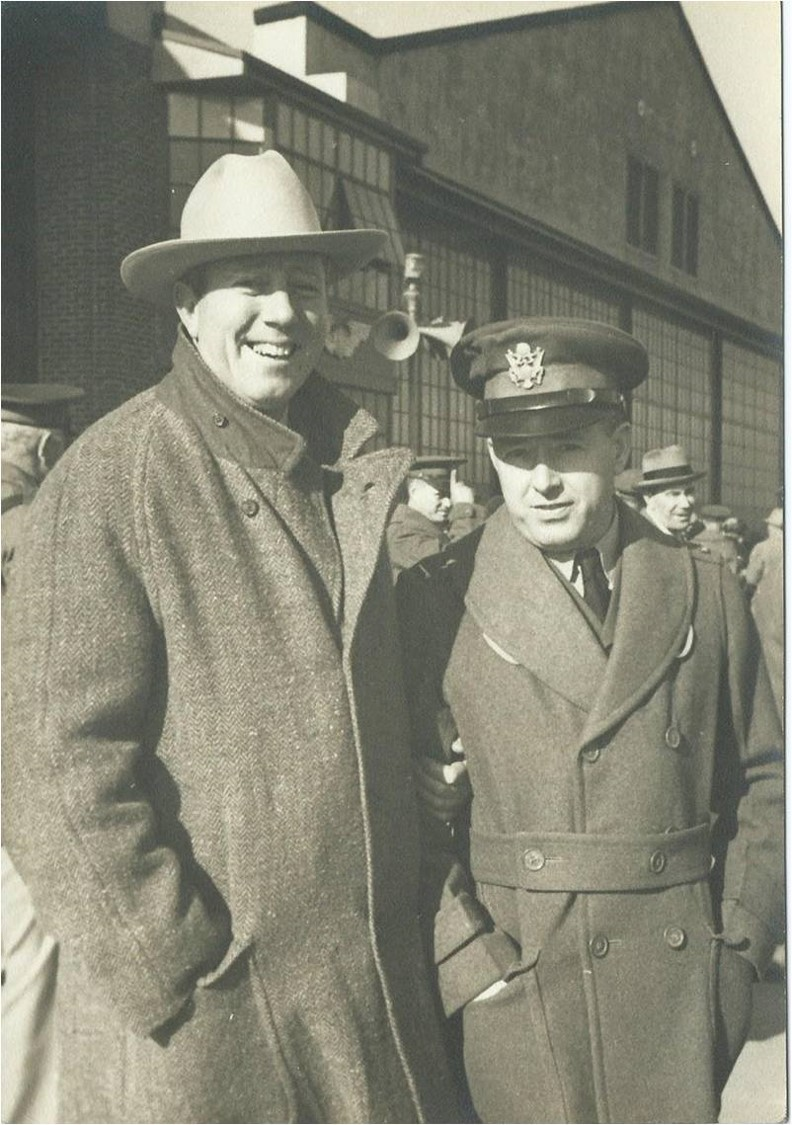
Journalist Frazier Hunt with Fellers after the war

After the war, Fellers remained on the staff of MacArthur, who was Supreme Commander for the Allied Powers in the occupation of Japan. Fellers's wartime psychological warfare planning had already treated the Emperor's authority as central to any successful surrender strategy; the 1945 implementation plan argued that, regardless of the Emperor's postwar status, American lives would be saved if he gave imperial sanction to peace on American terms. Among his duties was liaison between HQ and the Imperial Household. Soon after the occupation began, Fellers wrote several influential memoranda concerning why it would be advantageous for the occupation, reconstruction of Japan, and long-term US interests to keep Emperor Hirohito in place if he was not clearly responsible for war crimes.

Fellers met with the major defendants of the Tokyo tribunal. Under an assignment with the codename "Operation Blacklist", Fellers allowed them to co-ordinate their stories to exonerate Hirohito and all members of his family of war crimes. This was done at the behest of MacArthur, who had decided that there was to be no criminal prosecution of the Emperor or his family. Fellers, who came from a Religious Society of Friends family (commonly known as Quakers) and attended the Quaker-affiliated Earlham College, was instrumental in the selection of Elizabeth Vining, an American Quaker educator, as tutor to the Emperor's children.

== Army retirement and later life ==
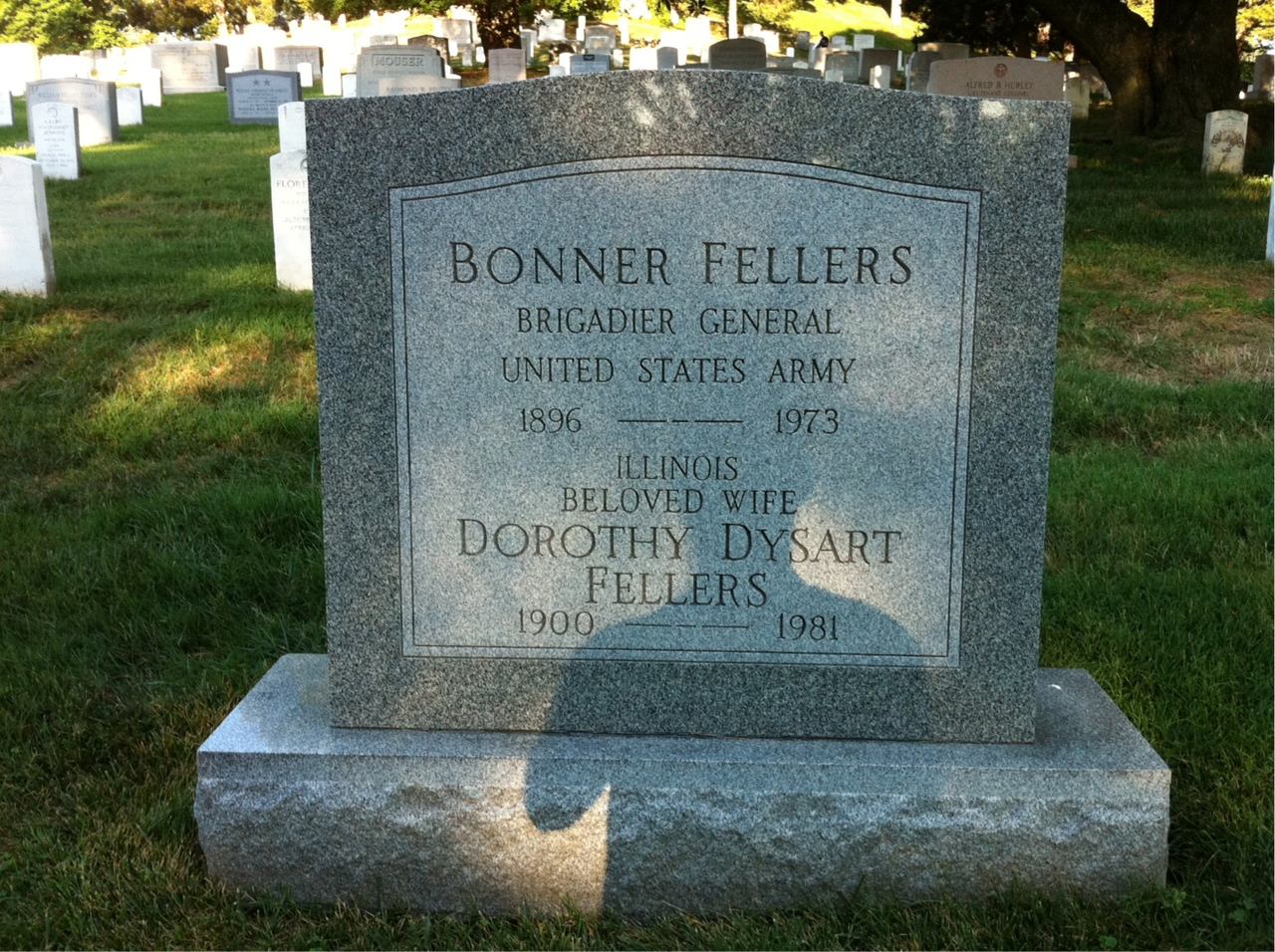
Fellers's grave at Arlington National Cemetery

In February 1946, Fellers reverted to the rank of colonel as part of a reduction in rank of 212 generals. He retired from the army on his own request on November 30, 1946. On August 16, 1948, his retirement rank was reinstated as brigadier general.

After retiring from the Army, Fellers worked for the Republican National Committee in Washington, D.C. In 1952, he was actively involved in promoting Robert A. Taft as a presidential candidate. On July 24, 1953, Fellers met with a number of former U.S. military officers, including Pedro del Valle and Claire Chennault, to form the Defenders of the American Constitution (DAC). The DAC believed in a "one-worldist conspiracy" led by New York Jewish financiers who controlled international communism, and described their goal as the defense of "the US constitution against enemies and encroachments, both foreign and domestic." Fellers was a member of the John Birch Society, which is named after a military intelligence officer, who was considered by its founding members to be the first casualty of the Cold War. In 1953 Fellers, wrote a book: Wings for Peace: A Primer for a New Defense (1953). In 1964, he was actively involved in promoting Barry Goldwater for the presidency.

Fellers sat on the board of trustees of the Americans for Constitutional Action group, founded in 1959, and on the "Co-ordination of Conservative Efforts" committee of Billy James Hargis' Anti-Communist Liaison, founded in 1962. He also served on the "Armed Services Committee" of the extreme right grouping known as the "Shickshinny Knights of Malta", not to be confused with the actual Knights of Malta, and on the National Advisory Board of Young Americans for Freedom. In 1971, Fellers received Japan's Order of the Sacred Treasure, Second Class, for his contribution to U.S.–Japan relations.

Fellers died at Georgetown University Hospital in Washington, D.C., on October 7, 1973, after suffering a heart attack, and was buried at Arlington National Cemetery.

== Dates of rank ==
Insignia	Rank	Component	Date
	Second lieutenant	Coast Artillery Corps, Regular Army	November 1, 1918
	First lieutenant	Regular Army	October 1, 1919
	Captain	Regular Army	December 3, 1934
	Major	Regular Army	July 1, 1940
	Lieutenant colonel	Army of the United States	September 15, 1941
	Colonel	Army of the United States	October 15, 1941
	Brigadier general	Army of the United States	December 4, 1942
	Lieutenant colonel	Regular Army	December 11, 1942
	Colonel (reverted)	Army of the United States	January 31, 1946
	Colonel	Retired List	November 30, 1946
	Brigadier General	Retired List	June 30, 1948

== Bibliography ==
- Bix, Herbert P. (2001). Hirohito and the Making of Modern Japan. New York: Perennial. ISBN 978-0-06-093130-8. OCLC 966087400.
- Cullum, George W. (1920). Biographical Register of the Officers and Graduates of the US Military Academy at West Point New York since its Establishment in 1802: Supplement Volume VI 1910–1920. Chicago, Illinois: R. R. Donnelly and Sons, The Lakeside Press.
- Cullum, George W. (1930). Biographical Register of the Officers and Graduates of the US Military Academy at West Point New York since its Establishment in 1802: Supplement Volume VII 1920–1930. Chicago, Illinois: R. R. Donnelly and Sons, The Lakeside Press.
- Cullum, George W. (1940). Biographical Register of the Officers and Graduates of the US Military Academy at West Point New York since its Establishment in 1802: Supplement Volume VIII 1930–1940. Chicago, Illinois: R. R. Donnelly and Sons, The Lakeside Press.
- Cullum, George W. (1950). Biographical Register of the Officers and Graduates of the US Military Academy at West Point New York since its Establishment in 1802: Supplement Volume IX 1940–1950. Chicago, Illinois: R. R. Donnelly and Sons, The Lakeside Press.
- Goodman, Grant K. (2012). "Bonner Fellers in the Philippines: American Colonial Prototype". Journal of American-East Asian Relations. 19 (1): 93–102. ISSN 1058-3947. JSTOR 23613172.
- Jenner, C. J. (2008). "Turning the Hinge of Fate: Good Source and the UK–U.S. Intelligence Alliance, 1940–1942". Diplomatic History. 32 (2). London: 165–205. doi:10.1111/j.1467-7709.2008.00688.x. ISSN 0145-2096.
- Matloff, Maurice; Snell, Edward M. (1990) [Original date 1953]. Strategic Planning for Coalition Warfare, 1941-1942 (PDF). United States Army in World War II. Washington, D.C.: United States Army Center of Military History. CMH Pub 1-3.
