= Batestown, Illinois =

Batestown
- Unincorporated community
- Location of Batestown within Illinois Batestown (the United States)
- Coordinates: 40°07′12″N 87°41′47″W
- Country: United States
- State: Illinois
- County: Vermilion
- Township: Danville
- Elevation: 650 ft (200 m)
- Time zone: UTC-6 (CST)
  - Summer (DST): UTC-5 (CDT)
- Area code: 217

Batestown is an unincorporated community in Danville Township, Vermilion County, Illinois. It is west of Danville, Illinois.

== History ==
Batestown was a suburb of Danville in the early 20th century. As of 1906, it had a black Baptist church led by the Reverend Dabney Jones. As of 1911, United Doctors operated the Decatur Institute in Batestown.

Lulu O'Dell ran a tavern in Batestown with her son in the 1940s.

== Geography ==
Batestown is located at 40°07′12″N 87°41′47″W.

== See also ==
- List of unincorporated communities in Illinois
