= Hillery, Illinois =

Hillery
- Unincorporated community
- Location of Hillery within Illinois Hillery (the United States)
- Coordinates: 40°07′52″N 87°41′40″W
- Country: United States
- State: Illinois
- County: Vermilion
- Township: Danville
- Elevation: 646 ft (197 m)
- Time zone: UTC-6 (CST)
  - Summer (DST): UTC-5 (CDT)
- Area code: 217
- GNIS feature ID: 410279

Hillery is an unincorporated community in Danville Township, Vermilion County, Illinois, United States.

== Geography ==
Hillery is located at 40°07′52″N 87°41′40″W.
