= Newtown, Illinois =

Newtown
- Unincorporated community
- Location of Newtown within Illinois Newtown (the United States)
- Coordinates: 40°10′02″N 87°46′09″W
- Country: United States
- State: Illinois
- County: Vermilion
- Township: Oakwood
- Elevation: 728 ft (222 m)
- Time zone: UTC-6 (CST)
  - Summer (DST): UTC-5 (CDT)
- Area code: 217

Newtown is an unincorporated community in Oakwood Township, Vermilion County, Illinois.

== History ==
This settlement is one of the oldest in the county. The name was originally two words, New Town. It was platted by Benjamin Coddington in 1838, but Stephen Griffith was said to have been the first settler in the area some time before this. The first postmaster was Samuel H. Oakwood, and the post office was first called Pilot, but this led to confusion with nearby Pilot Township. The post office closed around the turn of the century. One of the first churches in the county, Old Bethel, was built here in 1835 and served until 1873 when a new building was constructed. A multimillion-dollar coal power station was constructed here around the middle of the 20th century and is the main reason for Newtown's continued existence.

== Geography ==
Newtown is located at 40°10′02″N 87°46′09″W.
