= Hegeler, Illinois =

Hegeler
- Unincorporated community
- Location of Hegeler within Illinois Hegeler (the United States)
- Coordinates: 40°04′32″N 87°38′06″W
- Country: United States
- State: Illinois
- County: Vermilion
- Township: Danville
- Elevation: 653 ft (199 m)
- Time zone: UTC-6 (CST)
  - Summer (DST): UTC-5 (CDT)
- Area code: 217

Hegeler is an unincorporated community in Danville Township, Vermilion County, Illinois.

== Geography ==
Hegeler is located at 40°04′32″N 87°38′06″W.

== Transportation ==
Danville Mass Transit provides bus service on Route 9 connecting Hegeler to downtown Danville and other destinations.
