= Danville Township, Vermilion County, Illinois =

Danville Township
- Township
- Location in Vermilion County
- Coordinates: 40°06′37″N 87°36′38″W
- Country: United States
- State: Illinois
- County: Vermilion
- Created: 1851

Area
  - Total: 50.01 sq mi (129.5 km^{2})
  - Land: 49.43 sq mi (128.0 km^{2})
  - Water: 0.58 sq mi (1.5 km^{2}) 1.16%
- Elevation: 577 ft (176 m)

Population (2010)
  - Estimate (2016): 30,673
  - Density: 649.7/sq mi (250.9/km^{2})
- Time zone: UTC-6 (CST)
  - Summer (DST): UTC-5 (CDT)
- FIPS code: 17-183-18576

Danville Township is a township in Vermilion County, Illinois, USA. As of the 2010 census, its population was 32,113 and it contained 13,913 housing units. Danville Area Community College and the Illinois Department Of Corrections Danville Correctional Facility are in this township.

== History ==
Danville Township was one of the eight townships created in 1851.

Danville Township was named for Dan Beckwith, an Indian trader.

== Geography ==
According to the 2010 census, the township has a total area of 50.01 square miles (129.5 km^{2}), of which 49.43 square miles (128.0 km^{2}) (or 98.84%) is land and 0.58 square miles (1.5 km^{2}) (or 1.16%) is water.

=== Cities and towns ===
- Belgium (north three-quarters)
- Danville (the county seat) (southern portion)
- Tilton
- Westville (north edge)

=== Unincorporated towns ===
- Batestown
- Hegeler
- Hillery

=== Extinct towns ===
- Beeler Terrace
- Brookville
- Grape Creek
- South Danville
- Vandercook
- Vermilion Heights
- Walz
- Wyton

=== Adjacent townships ===
- Newell Township (north)
- Highland Township, Vermillion County, Indiana (east)
- Mound Township, Warren County, Indiana (east)
- Georgetown Township (south)
- McKendree Township (south)
- Catlin Township (southwest)
- Oakwood Township (west)
- Blount Township (northwest)

=== Cemeteries ===
The township contains these cemeteries: Atherton, Danville National, Forse, Greenwood, Hooten, Langley, Lutheran, Lynch, Oakhill, Parish, Saint Patrick's and Sandhill.

=== Major highways ===
- Interstate 74
- U.S. Route 136
- U.S. Route 150
- Illinois State Route 1

=== Rivers ===
- Vermilion River

=== Airports and landing strips ===
- Danville Correctional Center Heliport
- Lakeview Medical Center Heliport

== Demographics ==
Historical population
Census	Pop.	Note	%±
2016 (est.)	30,673
U.S. Decennial Census

== School districts ==
- Catlin Community Unit School District 5
- Danville Community Consolidated School District 118
- Oakwood Community Unit School District 76
- Westville Community Unit School District 2

== Political districts ==
- Illinois' 15th congressional district
- State House District 104
- State Senate District 52
