= Ross Township, Vermilion County, Illinois =

Ross Township
- Township
- Location in Vermilion County
- Coordinates: 40°21′24″N 87°38′04″W
- Country: United States
- State: Illinois
- County: Vermilion
- Created: 1851

Area
  - Total: 43.51 sq mi (112.7 km^{2})
  - Land: 43.51 sq mi (112.7 km^{2})
  - Water: 0 sq mi (0 km^{2}) 0%
- Elevation: 682 ft (208 m)

Population (2010)
  - Estimate (2016): 1,545
  - Density: 37.2/sq mi (14.4/km^{2})
- Time zone: UTC-6 (CST)
  - Summer (DST): UTC-5 (CDT)
- FIPS code: 17-183-65949

Ross Township is a township in Vermilion County, Illinois, USA. As of the 2010 census, its population was 1,617 and it contained 704 housing units.

== History ==
Ross Township was one of the eight townships created in 1851.

== Geography ==
According to the 2010 census, the township has a total area of 43.51 square miles (112.7 km^{2}), all land.

=== Cities and towns ===
- Rossville (south three-quarters)

=== Extinct towns ===
- Rossville Junction

=== Adjacent townships ===
- Grant Township (north)
- Jordan Township, Warren County, Indiana (east)
- South Ross Township (south)
- Butler Township (west)
- Middlefork Township (west)

=== Cemeteries ===
The township contains four cemeteries: Bethel, Mann's Chapel, Miller and Prairie Chapel.

=== Major highways ===
- Illinois State Route 1

=== Airports and landing strips ===
- James M. Adams Airport

== Demographics ==
Historical population
Census	Pop.	Note	%±
2016 (est.)	1,545
U.S. Decennial Census
