= Ridge Farm, Illinois =

Ridge Farm
- Village
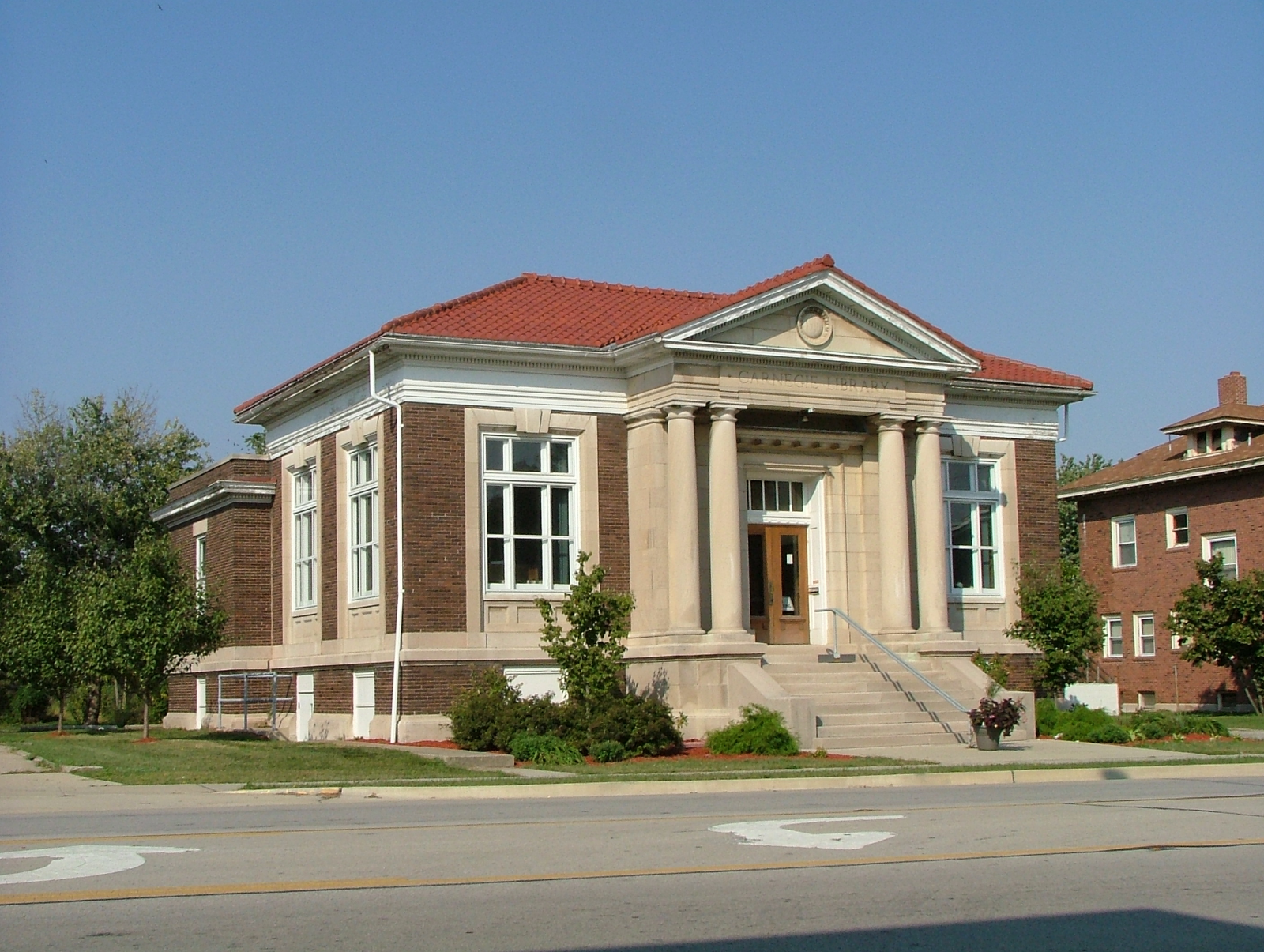
- The Carnegie library in Ridge Farm

- Location of Ridge Farm in Vermilion County, Illinois.

- Ridge Farm's location in Vermilion County
- Coordinates: 39°53′45″N 87°39′07″W
- Country: United States
- State: Illinois
- County: Vermilion
- Township: Elwood

Area
  - Total: 3.06 sq mi (7.92 km^{2})
  - Land: 3.06 sq mi (7.92 km^{2})
  - Water: 0 sq mi (0.00 km^{2})
- Elevation: 705 ft (215 m)

Population (2020)
  - Total: 940
  - Density: 257.5/sq mi (99.42/km^{2})
- Time zone: UTC-6 (CST)
  - Summer (DST): UTC-5 (CDT)
- ZIP code: 61870
- Area code: 217
- FIPS code: 17-63862
- GNIS ID: 2399071
- Website: ridgefarmillinois.com

Ridge Farm is a village in Elwood Township, Vermilion County, Illinois, United States. It is part of the Danville, Illinois Metropolitan Statistical Area. The population was 940 at the 2020 census.

== History ==
The town of Ridge Farm was named after Abraham Smith's Ridge Farm, located on a ridge of land running east to west through Elwood Township. The post office was established on May 17, 1841.

== Geography ==
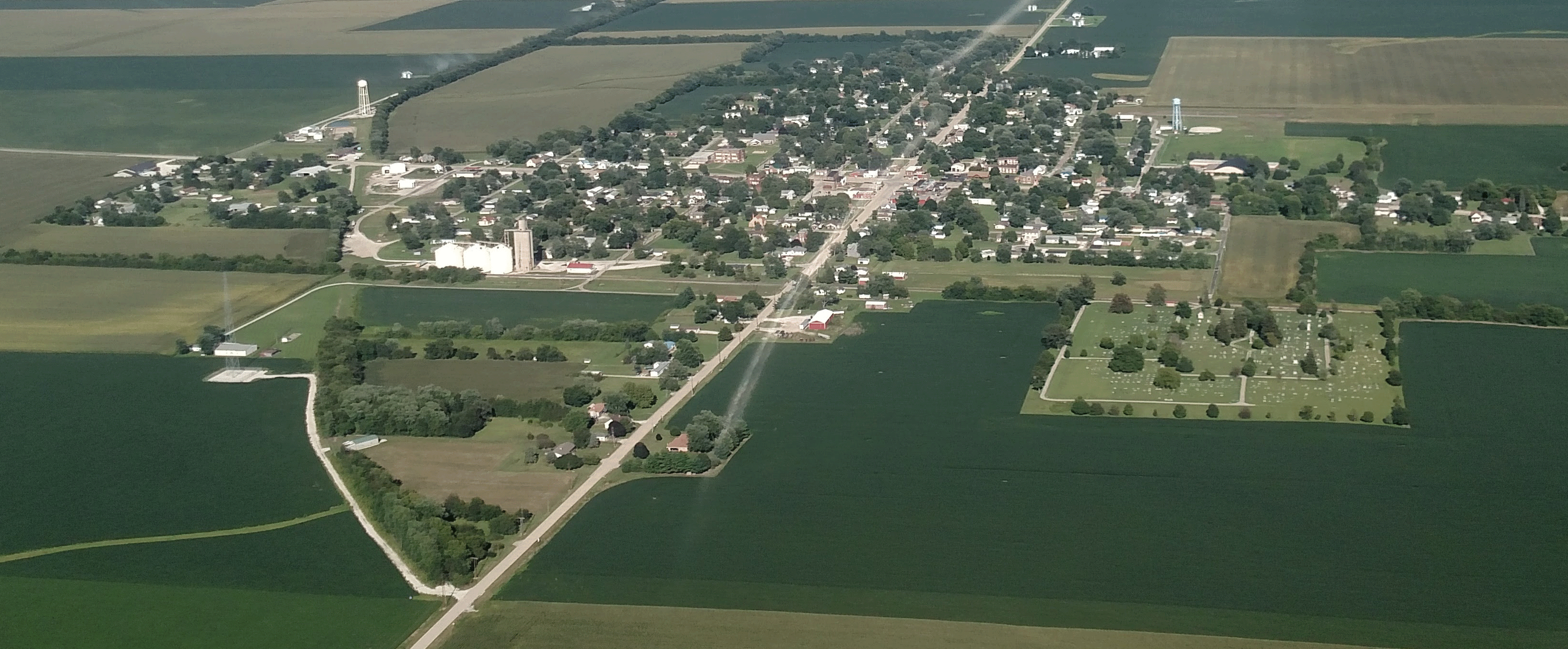
Aerial view looking to the east, 2016

According to the 2010 census, Ridge Farm has a total area of 3.06 square miles (7.93 km^{2}), all land.

== Demographics ==
Historical population
Census	Pop.	Note	%±
1880	237		—
1890	757		219.4%
1900	933		23.2%
1910	967		3.6%
1920	851		−12.0%
1930	888		4.3%
1940	890		0.2%
1950	905		1.7%
1960	894		−1.2%
1970	1,015		13.5%
1980	1,096		8.0%
1990	939		−14.3%
2000	912		−2.9%
2010	882		−3.3%
2020	787		−10.8%
U.S. Decennial Census

As of the census of 2000, there were 912 people, 365 households, and 258 families residing in the village. The population density was 291.6 inhabitants per square mile (112.6/km^{2}). There were 388 housing units at an average density of 124.1 units per square mile (47.9 units/km^{2}). The racial makeup of the village was 99.56% White, 0.11% Pacific Islander, and 0.33% from two or more races. Hispanic or Latino of any race were 0.44% of the population.

There were 365 households, out of which 31.0% had children under the age of 18 living with them, 58.1% were married couples living together, 9.3% had a female householder with no husband present, and 29.3% were non-families. 27.7% of all households were made up of individuals, and 15.6% had someone living alone who was 65 years of age or older. The average household size was 2.50 and the average family size was 3.03.

In the village, the population was spread out, with 27.3% under the age of 18, 7.0% from 18 to 24, 25.8% from 25 to 44, 24.9% from 45 to 64, and 15.0% who were 65 years of age or older. The median age was 38 years. For every 100 females, there were 96.1 males. For every 100 females age 18 and over, there were 86.8 males.

The median income for a household in the village was $33,333, and the median income for a family was $43,661. Males had a median income of $35,114 versus $24,083 for females. The per capita income for the village was $16,624. About 6.5% of families and 10.5% of the population were below the poverty line, including 10.0% of those under age 18 and 11.5% of those age 65 or over.

== Education ==
It is within the Georgetown-Ridge Farm Consolidated Unit School District 4.

== Notable person ==
- Bonner Fellers, U.S. Army officer who served during World War II as a military attaché and psychological warfare director.
