= South Ross Township, Vermilion County, Illinois =

South Ross Township
- Township
- Location in Vermilion County
- Coordinates: 40°18′05″N 87°39′24″W
- Country: United States
- State: Illinois
- County: Vermilion
- Created: 1927

Area
  - Total: 53.77 sq mi (139.3 km^{2})
  - Land: 53.77 sq mi (139.3 km^{2})
  - Water: 0 sq mi (0 km^{2}) 0%
- Elevation: 676 ft (206 m)

Population (2010)
  - Estimate (2016): 1,035
  - Density: 19.9/sq mi (7.7/km^{2})
- Time zone: UTC-6 (CST)
  - Summer (DST): UTC-5 (CDT)
- FIPS code: 17-183-71227

South Ross Township is a township in Vermilion County, Illinois, USA. As of the 2010 census, its population was 1,070 and it contained 445 housing units.

== History ==
South Ross township was created in 1927.

== Geography ==
According to the 2010 census, the township has a total area of 53.77 square miles (139.3 km^{2}), all land.

=== Cities and towns ===
- Alvin
- Henning

=== Extinct towns ===
- Barlow Park
- Rayville
- Thomas

=== Adjacent townships ===
- Ross Township (north)
- Jordan Township, Warren County, Indiana (east)
- Steuben Township, Warren County, Indiana (east)
- Newell Township (southeast)
- Blount Township (southwest)
- Middlefork Township (west)

=== Cemeteries ===
The township contains one cemetery, Gundy.

=== Major highways ===
- U.S. Route 136
- Illinois State Route 1
- Illinois State Route 119

== Demographics ==
Historical population
Census	Pop.	Note	%±
2016 (est.)	1,035
U.S. Decennial Census
