= Alvin, Illinois =

Alvin
- Village
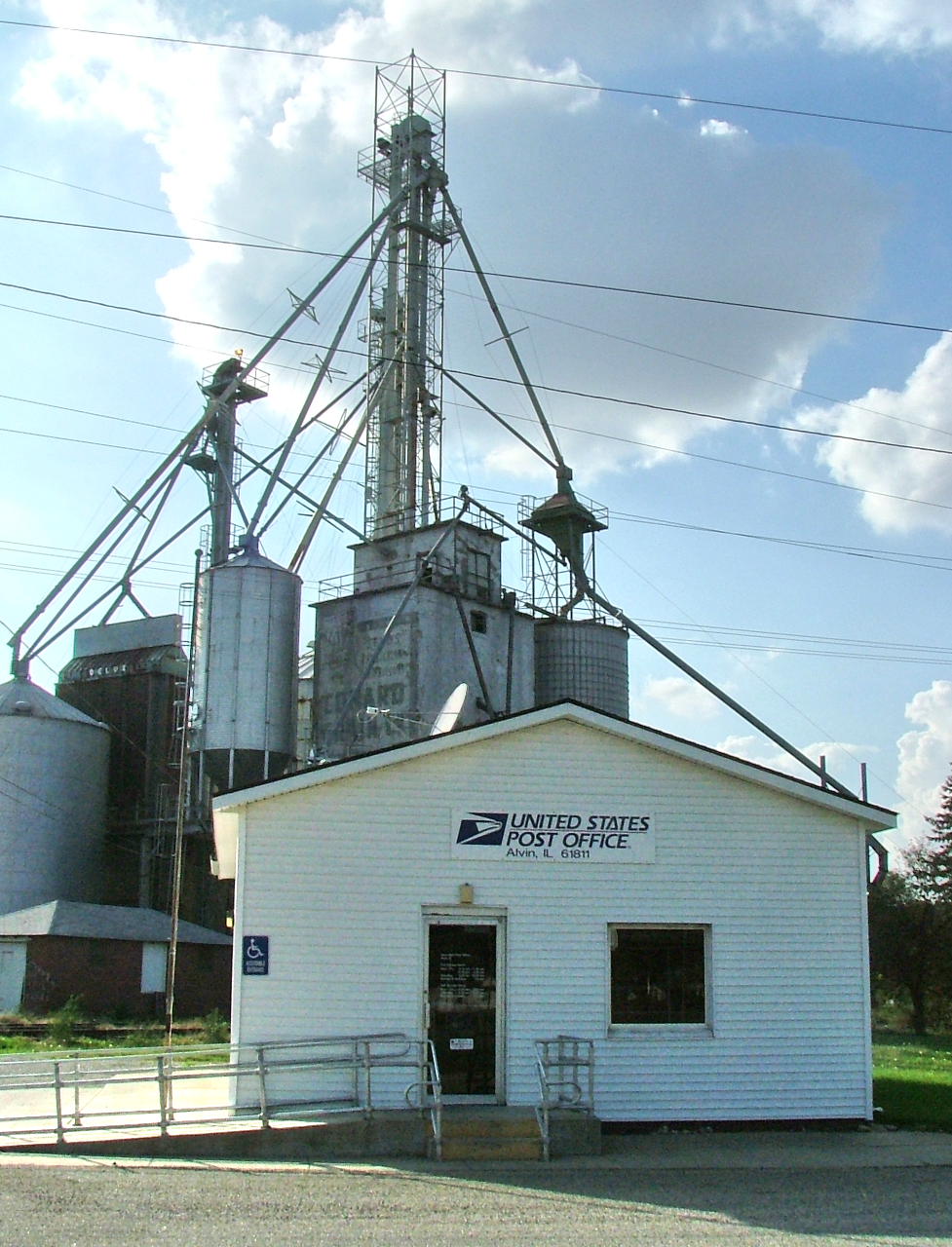
- Alvin post office and grain elevator

- Location of Alvan in Vermilion County, Illinois.
- Coordinates: 40°18′25″N 87°36′25″W
- Country: United States
- State: Illinois
- County: Vermilion
- Township: South Ross
- Founded: c. 1875

Area
  - Total: 0.79 sq mi (2.05 km^{2})
  - Land: 0.79 sq mi (2.05 km^{2})
  - Water: 0 sq mi (0.00 km^{2})
- Elevation: 640 ft (200 m)

Population (2020)
  - Total: 233
  - Density: 293.8/sq mi (113.42/km^{2})
- Time zone: UTC-6 (CST)
  - Summer (DST): UTC-5 (CDT)
- ZIP code: 61811
- Area code: 217
- FIPS code: 17-01242
- GNIS ID: 2397950
- Website: https://villageofalvin.com/

Alvin also Alvan is a village in South Ross Township, Vermilion County, Illinois, United States. It is part of the Danville, Illinois Metropolitan Statistical Area. As of the 2020 census, Alvin had a population of 233. The U.S. Post Office uses the name Alvin, however the village is also known by the alternate spelling Alvan (for example, by the U.S. Census Bureau).

== History ==
A settlement was founded in 1872 about a mile south of present-day Alvan, along the Chicago and Eastern Illinois Railroad, and was called Gilbert in honor of the founder, Alvan Gilbert. In 1875, the new Havana, Rantoul and Eastern Railroad (which became the Illinois Central Railroad) crossed the C&EI north of Gilbert, and the town of Alvan was founded at the intersection. Tradition says that the town's name became Alvin (with an "i" instead of an "a") because the post office misspelled it and refused to correct the error.

On March 16, 1942, a tornado struck Alvan and caused much destruction, killing six people. A marker in the town commemorates the tragic event and reads as follows:

Alvin Tornado
Monday, March 16, 1942
11:40 AM
Killed
Billy Smith - Henry O'Farrell
Ruth Viles - George Johnson
Odessa Scott - Goldie Hoover
Donated by
Mel Schriefer
2004
A.E. Hoskins

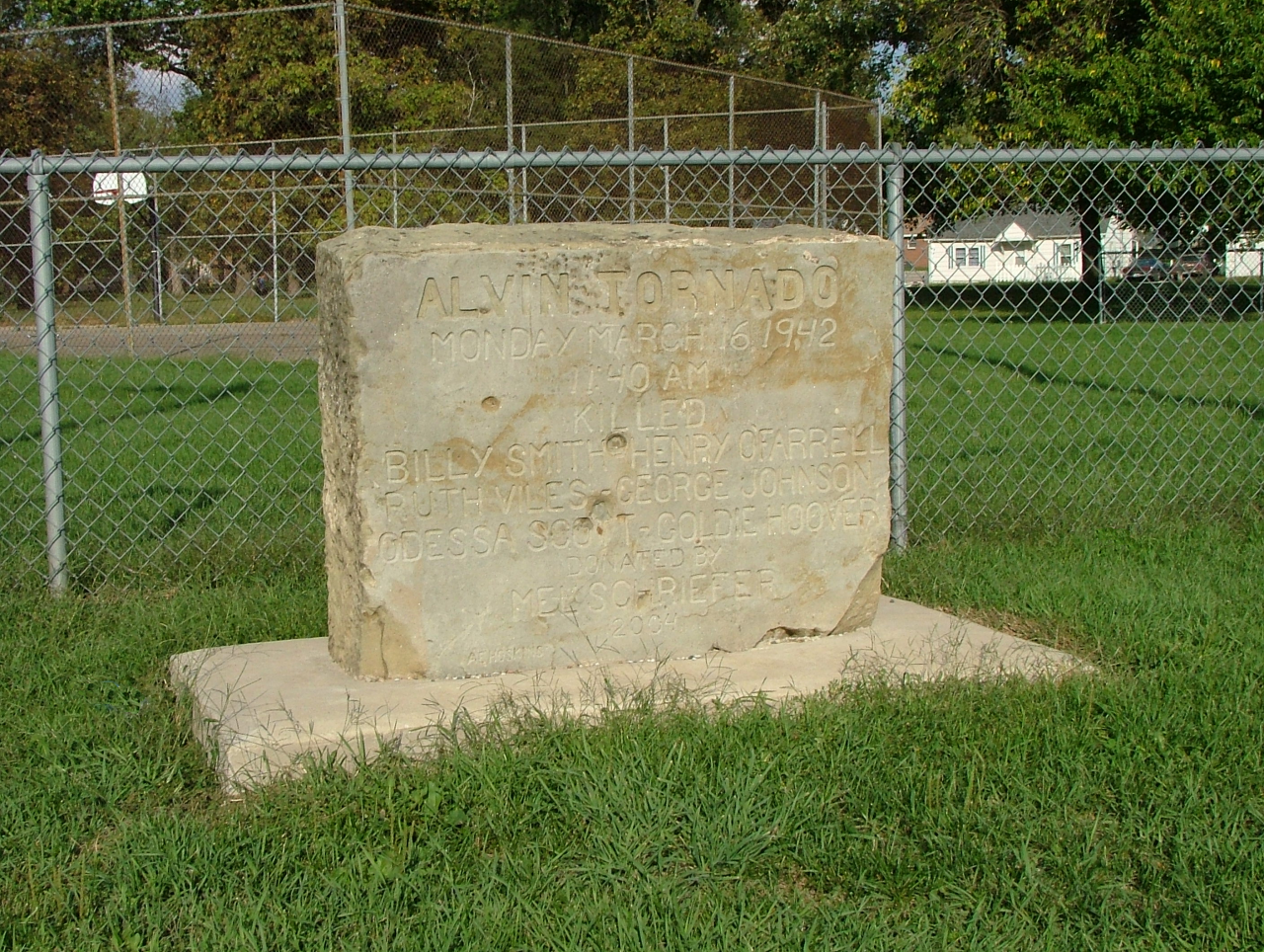
1942 tornado marker

== Geography ==
Alvan is located on County Road 3 approximately 3.6 miles north of Bismarck and 12 miles north of Danville. The North Fork of the Vermilion River flows past the west side of the community.

According to the 2010 census, Alvin has a total area of 0.79 square miles (2.05 km^{2}), all land.

== Demographics ==
Historical population
Census	Pop.	Note	%±
1880	165		—
1900	368		—
1910	319		−13.3%
1920	386		21.0%
1930	322		−16.6%
1940	339		5.3%
1950	287		−15.3%
1960	281		−2.1%
1970	318		13.2%
1980	378		18.9%
1990	339		−10.3%
2000	316		−6.8%
2010	270		−14.6%
2020	233		−13.7%
U.S. Decennial Census

As of the census of 2000, there were 316 people, 106 households, and 85 families residing in the village. The population density was 397.2 inhabitants per square mile (153.4/km^{2}). There were 115 housing units at an average density of 144.6 per square mile (55.8/km^{2}). The racial makeup of the village was 97.78% White, 1.58% Native American, 0.32% Asian, and 0.32% from two or more races. Hispanic or Latino of any race were 0.63% of the population.

There were 106 households, out of which 49.1% had children under the age of 18 living with them, 59.4% were married couples living together, 14.2% had a female householder with no husband present, and 19.8% were non-families. 19.8% of all households were made up of individuals, and 8.5% had someone living alone who was 65 years of age or older. The average household size was 2.98 and the average family size was 3.35.

In the village, the population was spread out, with 34.5% under the age of 18, 7.6% from 18 to 24, 29.7% from 25 to 44, 19.6% from 45 to 64, and 8.5% who were 65 years of age or older. The median age was 30 years. For every 100 females, there were 92.7 males. For every 100 females age 18 and over, there were 89.9 males.

The median income for a household in the village was $36,000, and the median income for a family was $38,333. Males had a median income of $30,278 versus $18,194 for females. The per capita income for the village was $13,773. About 7.0% of families and 8.2% of the population were below the poverty line, including 8.2% of those under age 18 and 31.6% of those age 65 or over.

== Education ==
It is in the Rossville-Alvin Community Unit School District 7.

The Rossville-Alvin high school stopped operations in 2006. High school choices for Rossville-Alvin residents include Bismarck Henning High School and Hoopeston Area High School.
