= Middlefork Township, Vermilion County, Illinois =

Middlefork Township
- Township
- Location in Vermilion County
- Coordinates: 40°19′13″N 87°50′17″W
- Country: United States
- State: Illinois
- County: Vermilion
- Created: 1851

Area
  - Total: 63.72 sq mi (165.0 km^{2})
  - Land: 63.7 sq mi (165 km^{2})
  - Water: 0.02 sq mi (0.052 km^{2}) 0.03%
- Elevation: 720 ft (220 m)

Population (2010)
  - Estimate (2016): 1,389
  - Density: 22.9/sq mi (8.8/km^{2})
- Time zone: UTC-6 (CST)
  - Summer (DST): UTC-5 (CDT)
- FIPS code: 17-183-48775

Middlefork Township is a township in Vermilion County, Illinois, USA. As of the 2010 census, its population was 1,458 and it contained 628 housing units.

== History ==
Middlefork Township was one of the eight townships created in 1851 and included all the land that later became Butler and Ford townships.

The first settlers in the township were Samuel Partlow and his wife and four sons, who arrived from Kentucky in 1829. A harsh winter caused the loss of all their cattle, and there was little game available for food; Samuel died that year and the family returned to Kentucky. However, the next year, they came back again.

== Geography ==
According to the 2010 census, the township has a total area of 63.72 square miles (165.0 km^{2}), of which 63.7 square miles (165 km^{2}) (or 99.97%) is land and 0.02 square miles (0.052 km^{2}) (or 0.03%) is water. The streams of Bean Creek, Bluegrass Creek and Knights Branch run through this township.

=== Cities and towns ===
- Potomac

=== Unincorporated towns ===
- Armstrong

=== Extinct towns ===
- Blue Grass
- Ellis

=== Adjacent townships ===
- Butler Township (north)
- Ross Township (east)
- South Ross Township (east)
- Blount Township (southeast)
- Pilot Township (south)
- Compromise Township, Champaign County (west)
- Kerr Township, Champaign County (west)

=== Cemeteries ===
The township contains seven cemeteries: Ingersoll, Old Partlow, Old Sowdowsky, Outton Family, Partlow, Potomac and Wallace Chapel.

=== Major highways ===
- U.S. Route 136
- Illinois State Route 49

== Demographics ==
Historical population
Census	Pop.	Note	%±
2016 (est.)	1,389
U.S. Decennial Census
