= Catlin Township, Vermilion County, Illinois =

Catlin Township
- Township
- Location in Vermilion County
- Coordinates: 40°03′38″N 87°43′28″W
- Country: United States
- State: Illinois
- County: Vermilion
- Created: 1858

Area
  - Total: 50.07 sq mi (129.7 km^{2})
  - Land: 49.79 sq mi (129.0 km^{2})
  - Water: 0.28 sq mi (0.73 km^{2}) 0.56%
- Elevation: 673 ft (205 m)

Population (2010)
  - Estimate (2016): 3,199
  - Density: 66.3/sq mi (25.6/km^{2})
- Time zone: UTC-6 (CST)
  - Summer (DST): UTC-5 (CDT)
- ZIP codes: 61817, 61832, 61834, 61841, 61846, 61858, 61883
- Area code: 217
- FIPS code: 17-183-11787

Catlin Township is a township in Vermilion County, Illinois, United States. As of the 2010 census, its population was 3,300 and it contained 1,342 housing units.

== History ==
Catlin Township was created in 1858.

== Geography ==
According to the 2010 census, the township has a total area of 50.07 square miles (129.7 km^{2}), of which 49.79 square miles (129.0 km^{2}) (or 99.44%) is land and 0.28 square miles (0.73 km^{2}) (or 0.56%) is water.

== Demographics ==
Historical population
Census	Pop.	Note	%±
2016 (est.)	3,199
U.S. Decennial Census

== Cities and towns ==
- Catlin

=== Extinct towns ===
- Bennett
- Charity
- Ryan

=== Adjacent townships ===
- Blount Township (north)
- Danville Township (east)
- Georgetown Township (southeast)
- Carroll Township (south)
- Jamaica Township (southwest)
- Vance Township (west)
- Oakwood Township (northwest)

=== Cemeteries ===
The township contains fourteen cemeteries: Allhands, Cox, Dougherty, God's Acre, Hickman, Jones Grove, Kight's, Mount Vernon, New Atherton, Oak Ridge, Pate, Songer, Spicer Family Plot and Wright Family.

=== Major highways ===
- Interstate 74
- U.S. Route 150

=== Airports and landing strips ===
- Cast Airport

=== Lakes ===
- Skyline Lake

== School districts ==
- Salt Fork Community Unit School District 512
- Danville Community Consolidated School District 118
- Georgetown–Ridge Farm Community Unit District 4
- Oakwood Community Unit School District 76
- Westville Community Unit School District 2

== Political districts ==
- Illinois' 15th congressional district
- State House District 104
- State Senate District 52
