= Carroll Township, Vermilion County, Illinois =

Carroll Township
- Township
- Location in Vermilion County
- Coordinates: 39°55′41″N 87°44′38″W
- Country: United States
- State: Illinois
- County: Vermilion
- Created: 1851

Area
  - Total: 37.29 sq mi (96.6 km^{2})
  - Land: 37.29 sq mi (96.6 km^{2})
  - Water: 0 sq mi (0 km^{2}) 0%
- Elevation: 679 ft (207 m)

Population (2010)
  - Estimate (2016): 592
  - Density: 16.4/sq mi (6.3/km^{2})
- Time zone: UTC-6 (CST)
  - Summer (DST): UTC-5 (CDT)
- ZIP codes: 61817, 61846, 61850, 61870, 61876
- Area code: 217
- FIPS code: 17-183-11449

Carroll Township is a township in Vermilion County, Illinois, United States. As of the 2010 census, its population was 612 and it contained 263 housing units.

== History ==
Carroll Township was one of the eight townships created in 1851. It was also the name of one of the original two townships created in March 1826, the other being called Ripley Township. It was probably named for Charles Carroll of Carrollton, a signer of the Declaration of Independence. Abraham Carroll, a resident of the area, may have influenced the choice.

== Geography ==
According to the 2010 census, the township has a total area of 37.29 square miles (96.6 km^{2}), all land.

=== Cities and towns ===
- Indianola

=== Extinct towns ===
- Maizetown

=== Adjacent townships ===
- Catlin Township (north)
- Georgetown Township (northeast)
- Elwood Township (east)
- Ross Township, Edgar County (south)
- Young America Township, Edgar County (southwest)
- Sidell Township (west)
- Jamaica Township (northwest)

=== Cemeteries ===
The township contains seven cemeteries: Lebanon, Michael, Sandusky, Stunkard, Weaver, Woodlawn and Workheiser.

== Demographics ==
Historical population
Census	Pop.	Note	%±
2016 (est.)	592
U.S. Decennial Census

== School districts ==
- Georgetown–Ridge Farm Community Unit District 4
- Jamaica Community Unit School District 12

== Political districts ==
- Illinois' 15th congressional district
- State House District 104
- State Senate District 52
