= Georgetown Township, Vermilion County, Illinois =

Georgetown Township
- Township
- Location in Vermilion County
- Coordinates: 40°00′17″N 87°38′23″W
- Country: United States
- State: Illinois
- County: Vermilion

Area
  - Total: 25.63 sq mi (66.4 km^{2})
  - Land: 25.6 sq mi (66 km^{2})
  - Water: 0.03 sq mi (0.078 km^{2}) 0.12%
- Elevation: 669 ft (204 m)

Population (2020)
  - Total: 7,449
  - Estimate (2016): 7,538
  - Density: 308.6/sq mi (119.2/km^{2})
- Time zone: UTC-6 (CST)
  - Summer (DST): UTC-5 (CDT)
- FIPS code: 17-183-28976

Georgetown Township is a township in Vermilion County, Illinois, USA. As of the 2010 census, its population was 7,901 and it contained 3,573 housing units.

== Geography ==
According to the 2010 census, the township has a total area of 25.63 square miles (66.4 km^{2}), of which 25.6 square miles (66 km^{2}) (or 99.88%) is land and 0.03 square miles (0.078 km^{2}) (or 0.12%) is water.

=== Cities and towns ===
- Belgium (south quarter)
- Georgetown
- Westville (vast majority)

=== Extinct towns ===
- Busenville
- Himrod
- Kellyville
- Midway
- Milton
- Steelton
- Unionville

=== Adjacent townships ===
- Danville Township (north)
- McKendree Township (east)
- Love Township (southeast)
- Elwood Township (south)
- Carroll Township (southwest)
- Catlin Township (northwest)

=== Cemeteries ===
The township contains seven cemeteries: Dukes, Forest Park, Lithuanian, Pleasant Mound, Saints Peter and Paul, Sandusky and Searl.

=== Major highways ===
- U.S. Route 150
- Illinois State Route 1

== Demographics ==
Historical population
| Census | Pop. | Note | %± |
|---|---|---|---|
| 2020 | 7,449 | | — |
U.S. Decennial Census
