= Mann's Chapel =

Church in Illinois, United States

Coordinates: 40°19′55.18″N 87°39′32.52″W

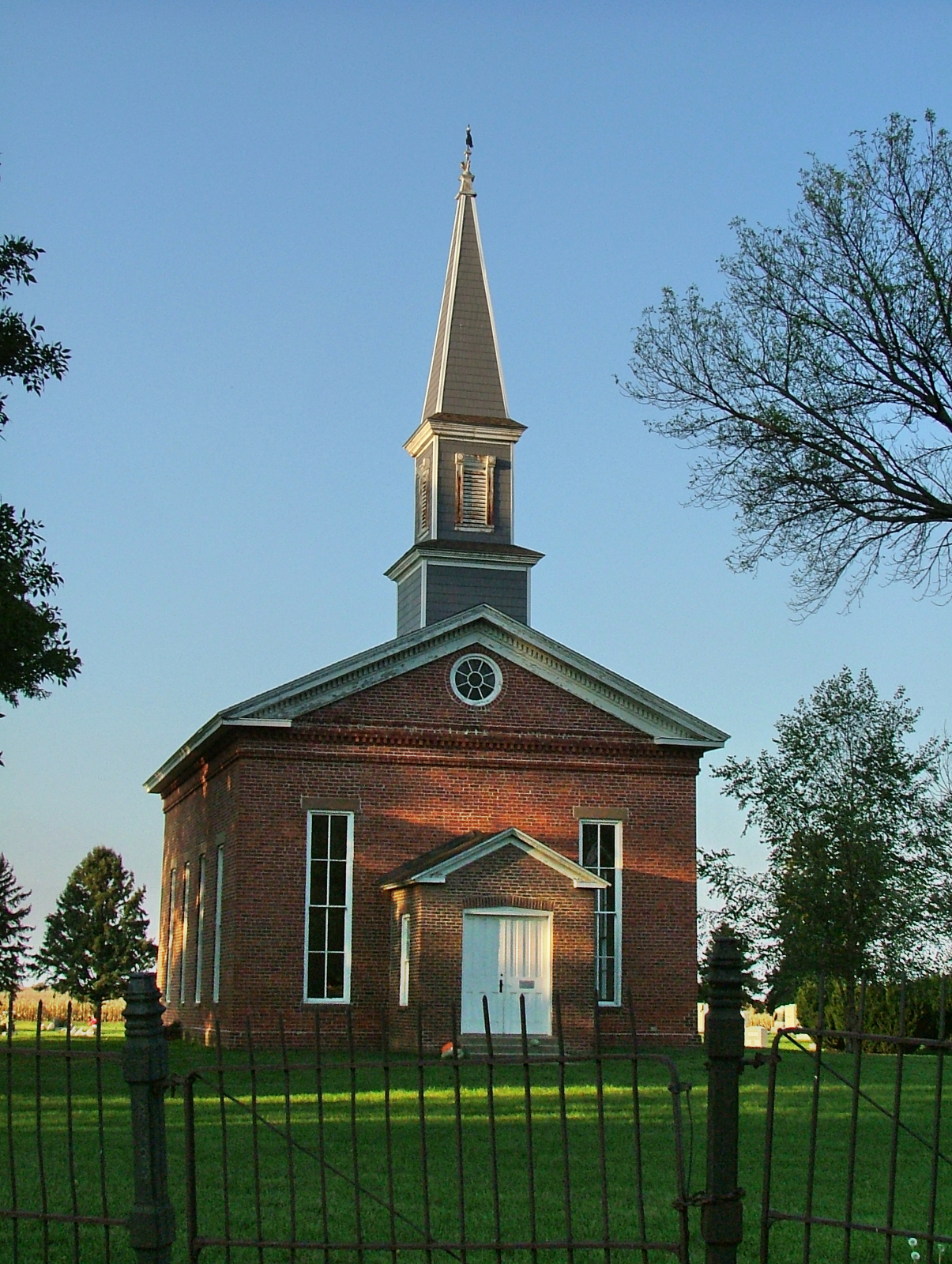
Looking north at Mann's Chapel

Mann's Chapel is a pioneer church in Vermilion County, Illinois, United States that was built in 1857. It is located just east of Illinois Route 1 a few miles south of the village of Rossville.

Samuel Gilbert and his son James donated land for use as a cemetery when James' eleven-day-old son Samuel died in August 1839. On April 1, 1855, Samuel and his wife donated additional land next to the cemetery for the chapel. It was built of bricks burned by Abraham Mann, who came to this area directly from England in 1832. Abraham had planned to build a new house with the bricks, but decided that the new church was more important.

The church fell into disuse in the 1920s, but was later restored through the efforts of several women's clubs in nearby Rossville.
