= Newell Township, Vermilion County, Illinois =

Newell Township
- Township
- Location in Vermilion County
- Coordinates: 40°12′37″N 87°35′01″W
- Country: United States
- State: Illinois
- County: Vermilion
- Created: 1851

Area
  - Total: 50.71 sq mi (131.3 km^{2})
  - Land: 49.98 sq mi (129.4 km^{2})
  - Water: 0.73 sq mi (1.9 km^{2}) 1.44%
- Elevation: 692 ft (211 m)

Population (2010)
  - Estimate (2016): 13,371
  - Density: 279.5/sq mi (107.9/km^{2})
- Time zone: UTC-6 (CST)
  - Summer (DST): UTC-5 (CDT)
- FIPS code: 17-183-52454

Newell Township is a township in Vermilion County, Illinois, USA. As of the 2010 census, its population was 13,969 and it contained 6,768 housing units.

== History ==
The first sale of land in this area was in 1824 to Obadiah Le Neve, who settled here just before Christmas of that year. It was not until 1851 that the county was divided up into its first eight townships, and Newell Township was one of those. It was named for Squire James Newell, the first Justice of the Peace for the area.

== Geography ==
According to the 2010 census, the township has a total area of 50.71 square miles (131.3 km^{2}), of which 49.98 square miles (129.4 km^{2}) (or 98.56%) is land and 0.73 square miles (1.9 km^{2}) (or 1.44%) is water. The township contains much of Lake Vermilion.

=== Cities and towns ===
- Bismarck
- Danville (the county seat) (north portion)

=== Unincorporated towns ===
- Illiana

=== Extinct towns ===
- Campbell
- Denmark
- Myersville
- Newell
- West Newell

=== Adjacent townships ===
- Kent Township, Warren County, Indiana (east)
- Steuben Township, Warren County, Indiana (east)
- Mound Township, Warren County, Indiana (southeast)
- Danville Township (south)
- Blount Township (west)
- South Ross Township (northwest)

=== Cemeteries ===
The township contains these cemeteries: Bryley, Farmers Chapel, Huffman, Lamb, Leonard, Rose, Springhill, Sunset Memorial and Walnut Corner.

=== Major highways ===
- U.S. Route 136
- Illinois State Route 1

=== Airports and landing strips ===
- Vermilion County Airport

== Demographics ==
Historical population
Census	Pop.	Note	%±
2016 (est.)	13,371
U.S. Decennial Census
