= Butler Township, Vermilion County, Illinois =

Butler Township
- Township
- Location in Vermilion County
- Coordinates: 40°25′49″N 87°50′51″W
- Country: United States
- State: Illinois
- County: Vermilion
- Created: 1840

Area
  - Total: 71.92 sq mi (186.3 km^{2})
  - Land: 71.91 sq mi (186.2 km^{2})
  - Water: 0 sq mi (0 km^{2}) 0%
- Elevation: 735 ft (224 m)

Population (2010)
  - Estimate (2016): 947
  - Density: 13.8/sq mi (5.3/km^{2})
- Time zone: UTC-6 (CST)
  - Summer (DST): UTC-5 (CDT)
- ZIP codes: 60932, 60942, 60960, 60963, 61865
- Area code: 217
- FIPS code: 17-183-10162

Butler Township is a township in Vermilion County, Illinois, United States. As of the 2010 census, its population was 992 and it contained 459 housing units.

== History ==
The township was formed from a portion of Middlefork Township in 1840 and was named after General Benjamin F. Butler, a civil war hero.

== Geography ==
According to the 2010 census, the township has a total area of 71.92 square miles (186.3 km^{2}), all land.

=== Cities and towns ===
- Rankin

=== Unincorporated towns ===
- East Lynn

=== Extinct towns ===
- Hustle
- Pellville
- Reilly

=== Adjacent townships ===
- Fountain Creek Township, Iroquois County (north)
- Lovejoy Township, Iroquois County (northeast)
- Grant Township (east)
- Ross Township (east)
- Middlefork Township (south)
- Kerr Township, Champaign County (southwest)
- Button Township, Ford County (west)
- Pigeon Grove Township, Iroquois County (northwest)

=== Cemeteries ===
The township contains three cemeteries: East Lynn, Pellville and Rankin.

=== Major highways ===
- Illinois State Route 9
- Illinois State Route 49

=== Airports and landing strips ===
- Russells Airport

== Demographics ==
Historical population
Census	Pop.	Note	%±
2016 (est.)	947
U.S. Decennial Census

== School districts ==
- Hoopeston Area Community Unit School District 11
- Paxton-Buckley-Loda Community Unit School District 10
- Rossville-Alvin Community Unit School District 7

== Political districts ==
- Illinois' 15th congressional district
- State House District 105
- State Senate District 53
