= Love Township, Vermilion County, Illinois =

Love Township
- Township
- Location in Vermilion County
- Coordinates: 39°55′36″N 87°34′37″W
- Country: United States
- State: Illinois
- County: Vermilion
- Created: 1902

Area
  - Total: 20.38 sq mi (52.8 km^{2})
  - Land: 20.37 sq mi (52.8 km^{2})
  - Water: 0.01 sq mi (0.026 km^{2}) 0.05%
- Elevation: 659 ft (201 m)

Population (2010)
  - Estimate (2016): 248
  - Density: 12.6/sq mi (4.9/km^{2})
- Time zone: UTC-6 (CST)
  - Summer (DST): UTC-5 (CDT)
- FIPS code: 17-183-44953

Love Township is a township in Vermilion County, Illinois, USA. As of the 2010 census, its population was 257 and it contained 105 housing units.

== History ==
Love Township was created in 1902. It was named for a Vermilion county judge named I. A. Love.

== Geography ==
According to the 2010 census, the township has a total area of 20.38 square miles (52.8 km^{2}), of which 20.37 square miles (52.8 km^{2}) (or 99.95%) is land and 0.01 square miles (0.026 km^{2}) (or 0.05%) is water. The stream of Yankee Branch runs through this township.

=== Extinct towns ===
- Bethel
- Humrick

=== Adjacent townships ===
- McKendree Township (north)
- Eugene Township, Vermillion County, Indiana (east)
- Vermillion Township, Vermillion County, Indiana (southeast)
- Prairie Township, Edgar County (south)
- Elwood Township (west)
- Georgetown Township (northwest)

=== Cemeteries ===
The township contains three cemeteries: Bethel, Whitlock and Yankee Point.

== Demographics ==
Historical population
Census	Pop.	Note	%±
2016 (est.)	248
U.S. Decennial Census
