= Oakwood Township, Vermilion County, Illinois =

Oakwood Township
- Township
- Nickname: Ivan Town, USA
- Location in Vermilion County
- Coordinates: 40°07′57″N 87°50′20″W
- Country: United States
- State: Illinois
- County: Vermilion
- Created: 1868

Area
  - Total: 64.7 sq mi (168 km^{2})
  - Land: 64.36 sq mi (166.7 km^{2})
  - Water: 0.34 sq mi (0.88 km^{2}) 0.53%
- Elevation: 650 ft (198 m)

Population (2010)
  - Estimate (2016): 3,336
  - Density: 54.5/sq mi (21.0/km^{2})
- Time zone: UTC-6 (CST)
  - Summer (DST): UTC-5 (CDT)
- FIPS code: 17-183-55015

Oakwood Township is a township in Vermilion County, Illinois, USA. As of the 2010 census, its population was 3,507 and it contained 1,518 housing units.

== History ==
Oakwood Township was created in 1868.

== Geography ==
According to the 2010 census, the township has a total area of 64.7 square miles (168 km^{2}), of which 64.36 square miles (166.7 km^{2}) (or 99.47%) is land and 0.34 square miles (0.88 km^{2}) (or 0.53%) is water. Lakes in this township include Doughnut Pond, Highway Pond, Inland Sea and Missionfield Pond. The streams of Feather Creek, Glenburn Creek and Stony Creek run through this township.

=== Cities and towns ===
- Fithian
- Muncie
- Oakwood

=== Unincorporated towns ===
- Newtown

=== Extinct towns ===
- Belgium Row
- Bronson
- Brothers
- Bucktown
- Glenburn
- Missionfield
- Rumpler
- Ivanville

=== Adjacent townships ===
- Pilot Township (north)
- Blount Township (northeast)
- Catlin Township (east)
- Danville Township (east)
- Catlin Township (southeast)
- Vance Township (southwest)
- Ogden Township, Champaign County (west)

=== Cemeteries ===
The township contains five cemeteries: Johnson Hill, Jones Family, Jones Family, Pleasant Grove and Stearns.

=== Major highways ===
- Interstate 74
- U.S. Route 150
- Illinois State Route 49

=== Airports and landing strips ===
- Wilson Airport

== Demographics ==
Historical population
Census	Pop.	Note	%±
2016 (est.)	3,336
U.S. Decennial Census
