= Rossville, Illinois =

Rossville
- Village (United States)
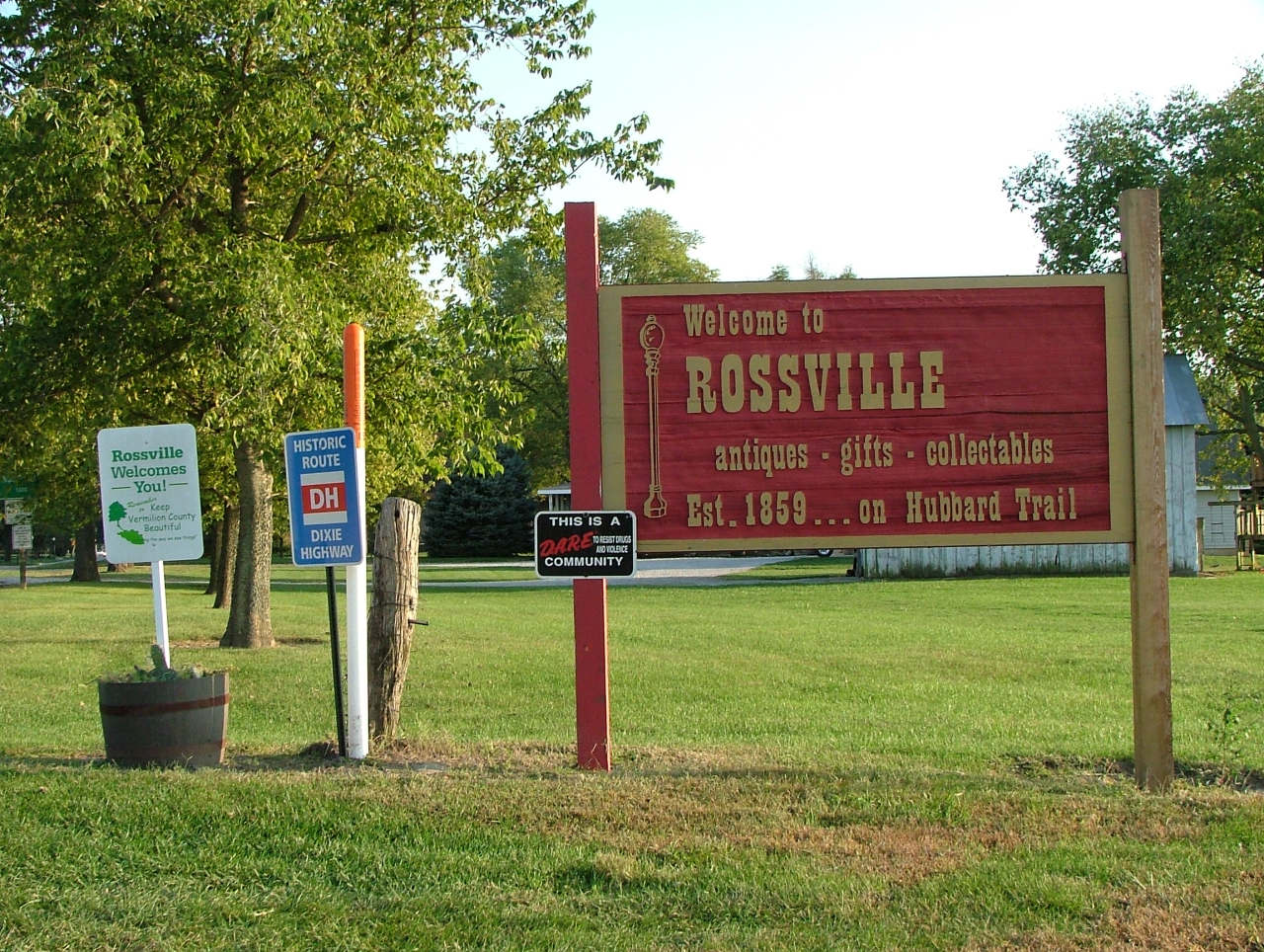
- Welcome sign at the north edge of town, 2007

- Location of Rossville in Vermilion County, Illinois.

- Rossville's location in Vermilion County
- Coordinates: 40°22′45″N 87°40′07″W
- Country: United States
- State: Illinois
- County: Vermilion
- Township: Grant, Ross
- Post office established: 1839
- Founded: 1862

Area
  - Total: 1.40 sq mi (3.62 km^{2})
  - Land: 1.40 sq mi (3.62 km^{2})
  - Water: 0 sq mi (0.00 km^{2})
- Elevation: 679 ft (207 m)

Population (2020)
  - Total: 1,221
  - Density: 873.7/sq mi (337.32/km^{2})
- Time zone: UTC-6 (CST)
  - Summer (DST): UTC-5 (CDT)
- ZIP code: 60963
- Area code: 217
- FIPS code: 17-65962
- GNIS ID: 2399127
- Website: Village Website

Rossville is a village in Ross Township, Vermilion County, Illinois, United States. As of the 2020 census, the city population was 1,221. It is part of the Danville, Illinois Metropolitan Statistical Area.

== History ==
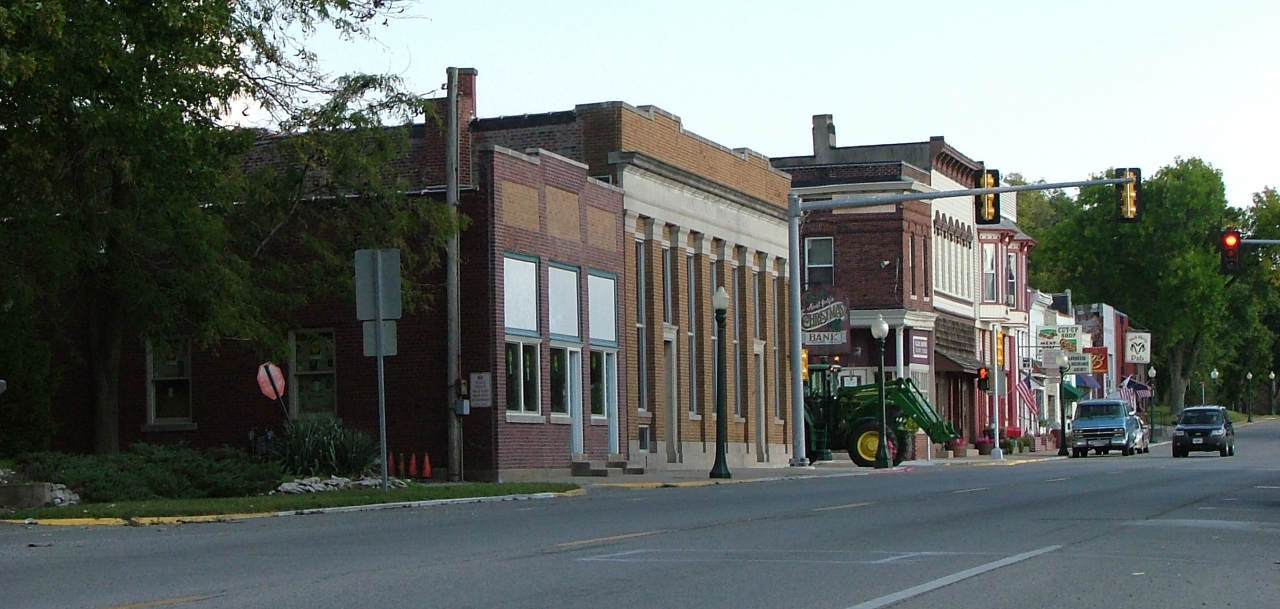
Downtown Rossville, 2007

The location was originally named Liggett's Grove in honor of John Liggett who built a lodging house in 1829. Liggett's cabin was located on the Hubbard Trail, an early trading route established by Gurdon Hubbard from Chicago to Danville. In 1833, this became the first state highway (now Illinois Route 1) and in 1914 was made part of the Dixie Highway.

In 1838, Alvan Gilbert purchased the Liggett farm, and the following year he became postmaster at the newly established post office. Rossville was incorporated as a village in August 1859. Rossville and Ross Township were named after Jacob Ross, a settler in the area.

In February 2004, a fire broke out in the downtown business district and destroyed several of the historic buildings and antique shops for which Rossville has been known.

== Geography ==
According to the 2010 census, Rossville has a total area of 1.4 square miles (3.63 km^{2}), all land.

== Demographics ==
Historical population
Census	Pop.	Note	%±
1880	768		—
1890	879		14.5%
1900	1,435		63.3%
1910	1,422		−0.9%
1920	1,588		11.7%
1930	1,453		−8.5%
1940	1,428		−1.7%
1950	1,382		−3.2%
1960	1,470		6.4%
1970	1,420		−3.4%
1980	1,363		−4.0%
1990	1,334		−2.1%
2000	1,217		−8.8%
2010	1,331		9.4%
2020	1,221		−8.3%
U.S. Decennial Census

=== 2020 census ===
As of the 2020 census, Rossville had a population of 1,221. The median age was 42.0 years. 23.6% of residents were under the age of 18 and 20.1% of residents were 65 years of age or older. For every 100 females there were 97.3 males, and for every 100 females age 18 and over there were 96.0 males age 18 and over.

0.0% of residents lived in urban areas, while 100.0% lived in rural areas.

There were 521 households in Rossville, of which 30.5% had children under the age of 18 living in them. Of all households, 43.4% were married-couple households, 22.1% were households with a male householder and no spouse or partner present, and 26.9% were households with a female householder and no spouse or partner present. About 33.2% of all households were made up of individuals and 16.9% had someone living alone who was 65 years of age or older.

There were 588 housing units, of which 11.4% were vacant. The homeowner vacancy rate was 4.6% and the rental vacancy rate was 10.7%.

Racial composition as of the 2020 census
Race	Number	Percent
White	1,136	93.0%
Black or African American	5	0.4%
American Indian and Alaska Native	2	0.2%
Asian	3	0.2%
Native Hawaiian and Other Pacific Islander	0	0.0%
Some other race	20	1.6%
Two or more races	55	4.5%
Hispanic or Latino (of any race)	47	3.8%

=== 2000 census ===
As of the census of 2000, there were 1,317 people,532, and 341 families residing in the village. The population density was 905.1 inhabitants per square mile (349.5/km^{2}). There were 596 housing units at an average density of 443.2 per square mile (171.1/km^{2}). The racial makeup of the village was 97.78% White, 0.25% African American, 0.16% Native American, 0.08% Asian, 0.90% from other races, and 0.82% from two or more races. Hispanic or Latino of any race were 2.14% of the population.

There were 533 households, out of which 27.6% had children under the age of 18 living with them, 50.8% were married couples living together, 10.1% had a female householder with no husband present, and 36.0% were non-families. 32.3% of all households were made up of individuals, and 18.0% had someone living alone who was 65 years of age or older. The average household size was 2.28 and the average family size was 2.89.

In the village, the population was spread out, with 23.3% under the age of 18, 8.6% from 18 to 24, 25.2% from 25 to 44, 24.3% from 45 to 64, and 18.6% who were 65 years of age or older. The median age was 41 years. For every 100 females, there were 89.9 males. For every 100 females age 18 and over, there were 86.1 males.

The median income for a household in the village was $36,442, and the median income for a family was $43,882. Males had a median income of $32,083 versus $19,813 for females. The per capita income for the village was $16,794. About 7.8% of families and 9.8% of the population were below the poverty line, including 13.0% of those under age 18 and 8.8% of those age 65 or over.

== Area attractions ==
Area attractions include the Rossville Historical Society Museum, the Rossville Railroad Depot Museum, Christman Park, and the Hubbard Trail Monument. South of Rossville are Historic Mann's Chapel (1857) and an original State Road Mile Marker from 1833.

The Rossville Community Organization is active in hosting community events. These include; Free A-Train week in September, Drivin' The Dixie Days in June, and Christmas in the Village on the first weekend in December.

Rossville has hosted an annual truck and tractor pull event nine years running. Held in Christman Park, there are typically three divisions for drivers to compete in including National Tractor Pull Association (NTPA), Illiana Pullers Association (IPA) and Local Classes. NTPA classes are Grant National Super Stock Tractors, Light Pro Stock Tractors, Super Farm Tractors and Grand National Light Unlimited Modified Tractors. IPA include Pro Farm Tractors, 2.6 Diesel Trucks, Farm Stock Tractors and N/A Tractors. The tractor pull draws crowds and helps raise funds for FFA scholarships.

== Transportation ==
Rossville is located at the intersection of Illinois Route 1 and County Road 14, about 7 miles south of Hoopeston and about 15 miles north of the county seat of Danville. A railroad operated by CSX Transportation passes through the east side of town.

== Education ==
It is in the Rossville-Alvin Community Unit School District 7.

The Rossville-Alvin high school stopped operations in 2006. High school choices for Rossville-Alvin residents include Bismarck Henning High School and Hoopeston Area High School.

== Notable people ==
- Tom Merritt (1911–1991), Illinois state senator and politician, was born in Rossville.
