= Bismarck, Illinois =

Bismarck
- Village
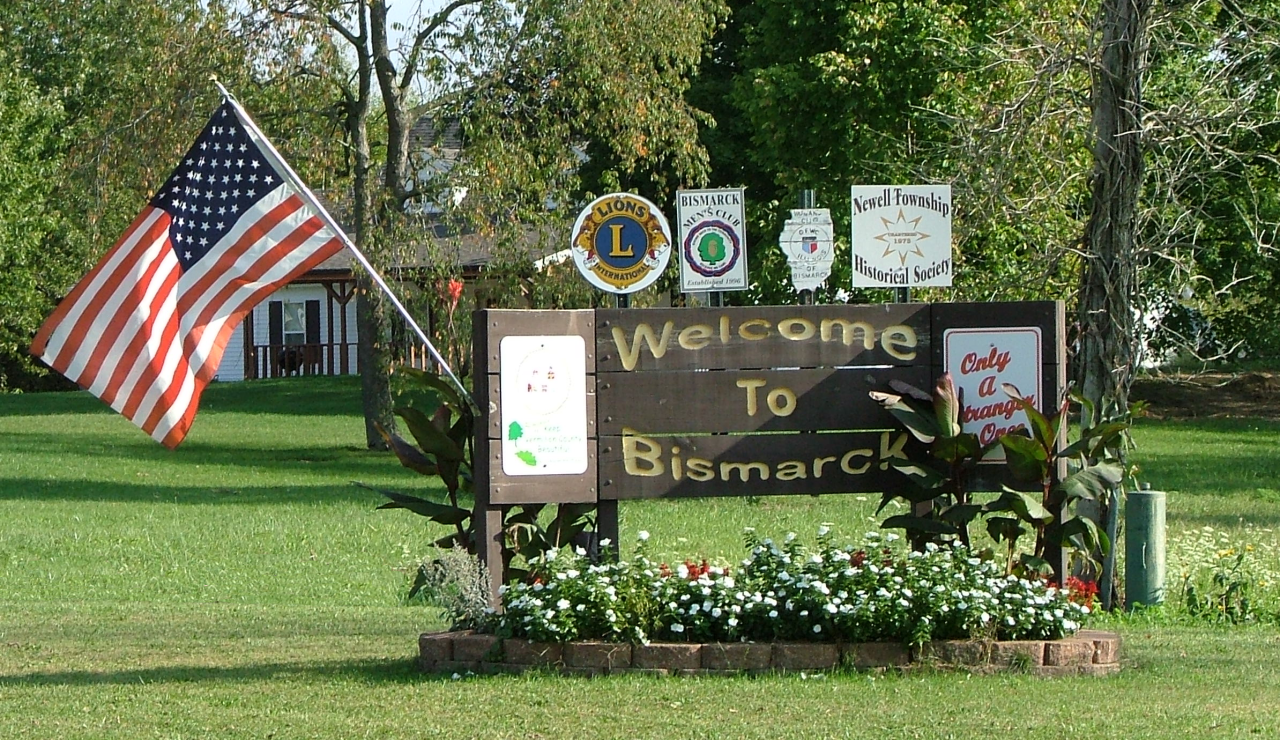
- Welcome sign at the west edge of town

- Location of Bismarck in Vermilion County, Illinois.

- Location of Illinois in the United States
- Coordinates: 40°15′34″N 87°36′41″W
- Country: United States
- State: Illinois
- County: Vermilion
- Township: Newell

Area
  - Total: 0.75 sq mi (1.93 km^{2})
  - Land: 0.75 sq mi (1.93 km^{2})
  - Water: 0 sq mi (0.00 km^{2})
- Elevation: 679 ft (207 m)

Population (2020)
  - Total: 582
  - Density: 782.8/sq mi (302.25/km^{2})
- Time zone: UTC-6 (CST)
  - Summer (DST): UTC-5 (CDT)
- Postal code: 61814
- Area code: 217
- FIPS code: 17-06184
- GNIS ID: 2398128

Bismarck is a village in Newell Township, Vermilion County, Illinois, United States. It is part of the Danville, Illinois Metropolitan Statistical Area. The population was 582 at the 2020 census.

== History ==
The original settlement in this immediate area was to the west of Bismarck's location, where the Hubbard Trail and the North Fork of the Vermilion River crossed. It was originally called Franklin when it was founded in 1837, but it lasted only a few years. Later, in 1843, Brothers John and Samuel Myers built a grist (flour) mill near the site of Franklin, and a town called Myersville, named after the two brothers, later grew up there. The nearby Gundy Cemetery, established in the 1820s–1830s, serves as a pioneer burial ground for the Myersville area and includes the grave of Revolutionary War soldier Jacob Gundy (d. 1845).”

In 1872, the C&EI Railroad went through the area; the tracks did not go through Myersville, but passed one and a half miles to the east. Gradually, the town moved toward the railroad on land donated by Charles S. Young and Dr. John B. Holloway. Young named the town Bismarck after the German statesman and chancellor Otto von Bismarck, whom he admired.

On September 13, 1997, the community celebrated its 125th birthday. Festivities, which were attended by about 2,000 people, included a parade, contests, historical exhibits at the local grade school, and multiple performances.

In 1998, the village of Bismarck was incorporated. The members of the first village board were Mayor Eleanor White, Julie Boersma, Pat Kentner, Chuck Mockbee, Lyle Milner, Diane Holycross, Don Evans, Alvina Van Pelt, and Betty Lewis.

In August 2017, the Newell Township Historical Society opened Bismarck's Municipal history museum in the village's old bank house.

== Geography ==
Bismarck is located about eight miles north of the county seat of Danville.

According to the 2010 census, Bismarck has a total area of 0.74 square miles (1.92 km^{2}), all land.

== Education ==
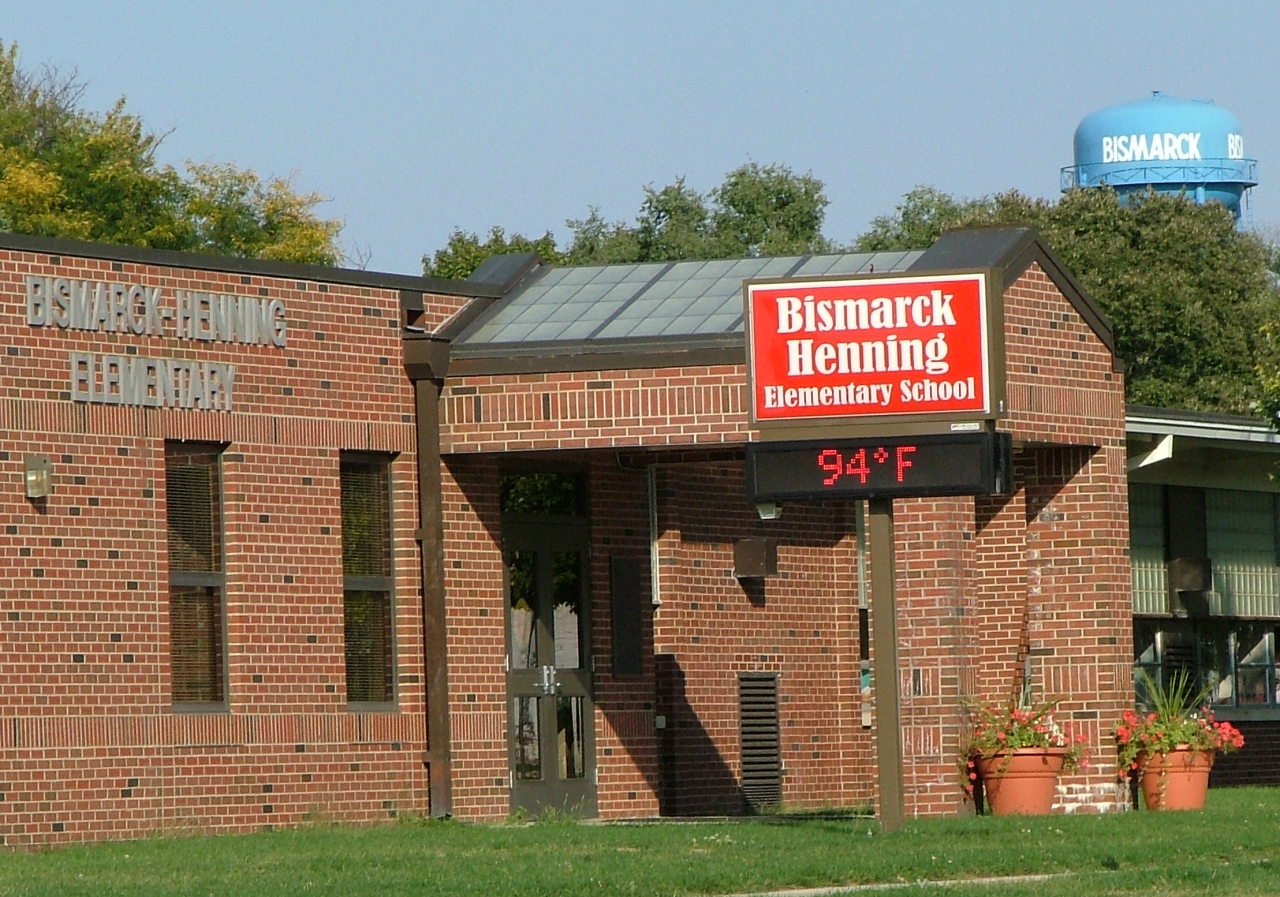
Bismarck-Henning elementary school

It is in the Bismarck-Henning Consolidated Unit School District.

Public schools include Bismarck Henning Grade School, Bismarck Henning Junior High School, and Bismarck Henning High School.

== Demographics ==
Historical population
Census	Pop.	Note	%±
1880	1,380		—
2000	542		—
2010	579		6.8%
2020	582		0.5%
U.S. Decennial Census

As of 2024 statistics, the population, excluding incorporated surrounding regions, was 507 people. There were 203 housing units, and 201 households. There were 147 families residing in the village. The population density was 681.9 people per square mile. The average density of the housing units was 295 units per square mile. The racial makeup of the village was 91.9% White, 1.58% Asian, 4.54% Hispanic, and 1.98% from two or more races.

Among the 201 households, 28.7% had children under the age of 18 living with them, 69% were married couples living together, 13% had a female householder with no husband present, 8% had a male householder with no wife present and 11% were non-families. The average population per household was 3.

In the village, the population was spread out, with 27% under the age of 18, 17% from 0 to 9, 12% from 10 to 19, 11% from 20 to 29, 7% from 30 to 39, 17% from 40 to 49, 16% from 50 to 59, 8% from 60 to 69, 9% from 70 to 79, and 4% were 80+. The median age was 41.8 years. The gender ratio was 53.4% majority female over a 46.6% male minority.

The median income for a household in the village was $79,583/year and the median income for a household was $80,774/year. The per capita income for the village was $46,406. Households led by residents aged 25 to 44, usually in the early to mid-stages of their careers, have a median income of $94,722. Those with someone between 45 and 64 in charge, often well-established professionally, earn $86,250 overall. About 10.1% of the population were below the poverty line

The job market in Bismarck is composed of 239 working residents, spread across a range of industries and roles. 76.6% of the working population are employed in professional or administrative positions, while 23.4% are in hands-on or service-based jobs. Also, 8.8% run their own businesses, 60.2% are employed by private companies, and 24.3% work in the public sector. 76.6% of the working population are white collar workers, and the remaining 23.4% are blue collar workers. The unemployment rate in Bismarck stands at 4.8%.

== Notable people ==
- Dylan Dodd, professional baseball player
