= Blount Township, Vermilion County, Illinois =

Blount Township
- Township
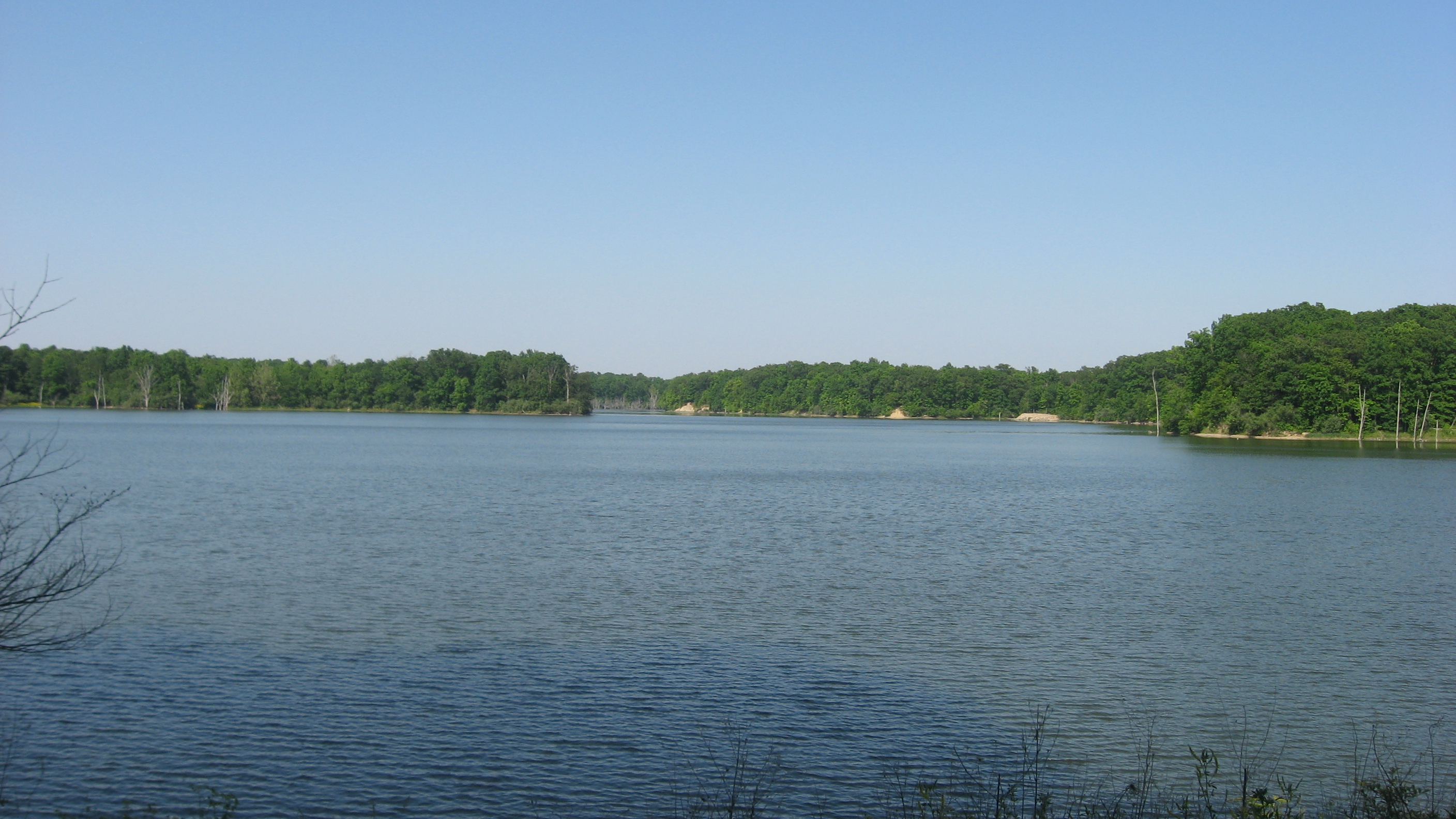
- Lake at Kennekuk County Park, in the western part of the township

- Location in Vermilion County
- Coordinates: 40°12′50″N 87°42′09″W
- Country: United States
- State: Illinois
- County: Vermilion
- Created: 1856

Area
  - Total: 51.72 sq mi (134.0 km^{2})
  - Land: 51.36 sq mi (133.0 km^{2})
  - Water: 0.36 sq mi (0.93 km^{2}) 0.70%
- Elevation: 679 ft (207 m)

Population (2010)
  - Estimate (2016): 3,312
  - Density: 66.7/sq mi (25.8/km^{2})
- Time zone: UTC-6 (CST)
  - Summer (DST): UTC-5 (CDT)
- ZIP codes: 61811, 61831, 61832, 61834, 61858, 61865
- Area code: 217
- FIPS code: 17-183-06678
- GNIS feature ID: 0428686

Blount Township is a township in Vermilion County, Illinois, United States. As of the 2010 census, its population was 3,428 and it contained 1,475 housing units.

== History ==
Blount Township was established in 1856 from portions of Newell and Pilot townships. It was originally named after John C. Frémont, the Republican candidate for president that year. Democrats objected, and the township was named after early settler Abraham Blount.

== Geography ==
According to the 2010 census, the township has a total area of 51.72 square miles (134.0 km^{2}), of which 51.36 square miles (133.0 km^{2}) (or 99.30%) is land and 0.36 square miles (0.93 km^{2}) (or 0.70%) is water. The northwestern portion of the county seat of Danville extends into the southeast portion of the township, as does a portion of Lake Vermilion.

=== Cities and towns ===
- Danville, the county seat (northwest edge)

=== Extinct towns ===
- Grumle Corner
- Higginsville
- Jamesburg
- Johnsonville
- Moore's Corner
- Snider
- Vernal

=== Adjacent townships ===
- South Ross Township (northeast)
- Newell Township (east)
- Danville Township (southeast)
- Catlin Township (south)
- Oakwood Township (southwest)
- Pilot Township (west)
- Middlefork Township (northwest)

=== Cemeteries ===
The township contains eleven cemeteries: Bethel, Dodson, Fairchild, Gordon, Higginsville, Johnson, New Salem, Newell Grove, Pentecost, Porter, Snider and Thurman.

=== Major highways ===
- U.S. Route 136
- Illinois State Route 1

=== Airports and landing strips ===
- Flying B Ranch Airport
- Melody Field

== Demographics ==
Historical population
Census	Pop.	Note	%±
2016 (est.)	3,312
U.S. Decennial Census

== School districts ==
- Bismarck Henning Consolidated Unit School District
- Danville Community Consolidated School District 118
- Oakwood Community Unit School District 76

== Political districts ==
- Illinois' 15th congressional district
- State House District 104
- State Senate District 52
