= Elwood Township, Vermilion County, Illinois =

Elwood Township
- Township
- Location in Vermilion County
- Coordinates: 39°54′19″N 87°38′39″W
- Country: United States
- State: Illinois
- County: Vermilion
- Created: 1851

Area
  - Total: 24.89 sq mi (64.5 km^{2})
  - Land: 24.81 sq mi (64.3 km^{2})
  - Water: 0.08 sq mi (0.21 km^{2}) 0.32%
- Elevation: 690 ft (210 m)

Population (2010)
  - Estimate (2016): 1,575
  - Density: 66.4/sq mi (25.6/km^{2})
- Time zone: UTC-6 (CST)
  - Summer (DST): UTC-5 (CDT)
- FIPS code: 17-183-23932

Elwood Township is a township in Vermilion County, Illinois, USA. As of the 2010 census, its population was 1,647 and it contained 718 housing units.

== History ==
Elwood Township was one of the eight townships created in 1851. It was named after the Elwood Meeting House, which had been named for Thomas Ellwood. John Haworth, founder of the Vermilion County Quaker community, likely suggested the name.

== Geography ==
According to the 2010 census, the township has a total area of 24.89 square miles (64.5 km^{2}), of which 24.81 square miles (64.3 km^{2}) (or 99.68%) is land and 0.08 square miles (0.21 km^{2}) (or 0.32%) is water.

=== Cities and towns ===
- Ridge Farm

=== Unincorporated towns ===
- Olivet
- Vermilion Grove

=== Adjacent townships ===
- Georgetown Township (north)
- Love Township (east)
- Prairie Township, Edgar County (southeast)
- Ross Township, Edgar County (southwest)
- Carroll Township (west)

=== Cemeteries ===
The township contains six cemeteries: Crown Hill, Dalbey, Pilot Grove, Sharon, Shock and Vermilion.

=== Major highways ===
- U.S. Route 150
- Illinois State Route 1

== Demographics ==
Historical population
Census	Pop.	Note	%±
2016 (est.)	1,575
U.S. Decennial Census

== School districts ==
- Georgetown–Ridge Farm Community Unit District 4
- Jamaica Community Unit School District 12

== Political districts ==
- Illinois' 15th congressional district
- State House District 104
- State Senate District 52
