= Grant Township, Vermilion County, Illinois =

Grant Township
- Township
- Location in Vermilion County
- Coordinates: 40°26′51″N 87°38′45″W
- Country: United States
- State: Illinois
- County: Vermilion
- Created: 1862

Area
  - Total: 86.69 sq mi (224.5 km^{2})
  - Land: 86.66 sq mi (224.4 km^{2})
  - Water: 0.03 sq mi (0.078 km^{2}) 0.03%
- Elevation: 696 ft (212 m)

Population (2010)
  - Estimate (2016): 5,781
  - Density: 69.6/sq mi (26.9/km^{2})
- Time zone: UTC-6 (CST)
  - Summer (DST): UTC-5 (CDT)
- FIPS code: 17-183-30965

Grant Township is a township in Vermilion County, Illinois, USA. As of the 2010 census, its population was 6,028 and it contained 2,817 housing units.

== History ==
Grant Township was originally called Lyon Township but it was changed in 1862 to honor Ulysses S. Grant. He had just won a surrender by Confederate forces at Fort Donelson in Tennessee.

== Geography ==
According to the 2010 census, the township has a total area of 86.69 square miles (224.5 km^{2}), of which 86.66 square miles (224.4 km^{2}) (or 99.97%) is land and 0.03 square miles (0.078 km^{2}) (or 0.03%) is water.

=== Cities and towns ===
- Hoopeston
- Rossville (north quarter)

=== Unincorporated towns ===
- Cheneyville

=== Extinct towns ===
- Coalton
- Heaton

=== Adjacent townships ===
- Hickory Grove Township, Benton County, Indiana (northeast)
- Prairie Green Township, Iroquois County (northeast)
- Prairie Township, Warren County, Indiana (east)
- Jordan Township, Warren County, Indiana (southeast)
- Ross Township (south)
- Butler Township (west)
- Fountain Creek Township, Iroquois County (northwest)
- Lovejoy Township, Iroquois County (northwest)

=== Cemeteries ===
The township contains one cemetery, Redtop.

=== Major highways ===
- Illinois State Route 1
- Illinois State Route 9

=== Airports and landing strips ===
- Beckley Airfield
- Hoopeston Community Memorial Hospital Heliport

== Demographics ==
Historical population
Census	Pop.	Note	%±
2016 (est.)	5,781
U.S. Decennial Census
