= Westville, Illinois =

Westville
- Village
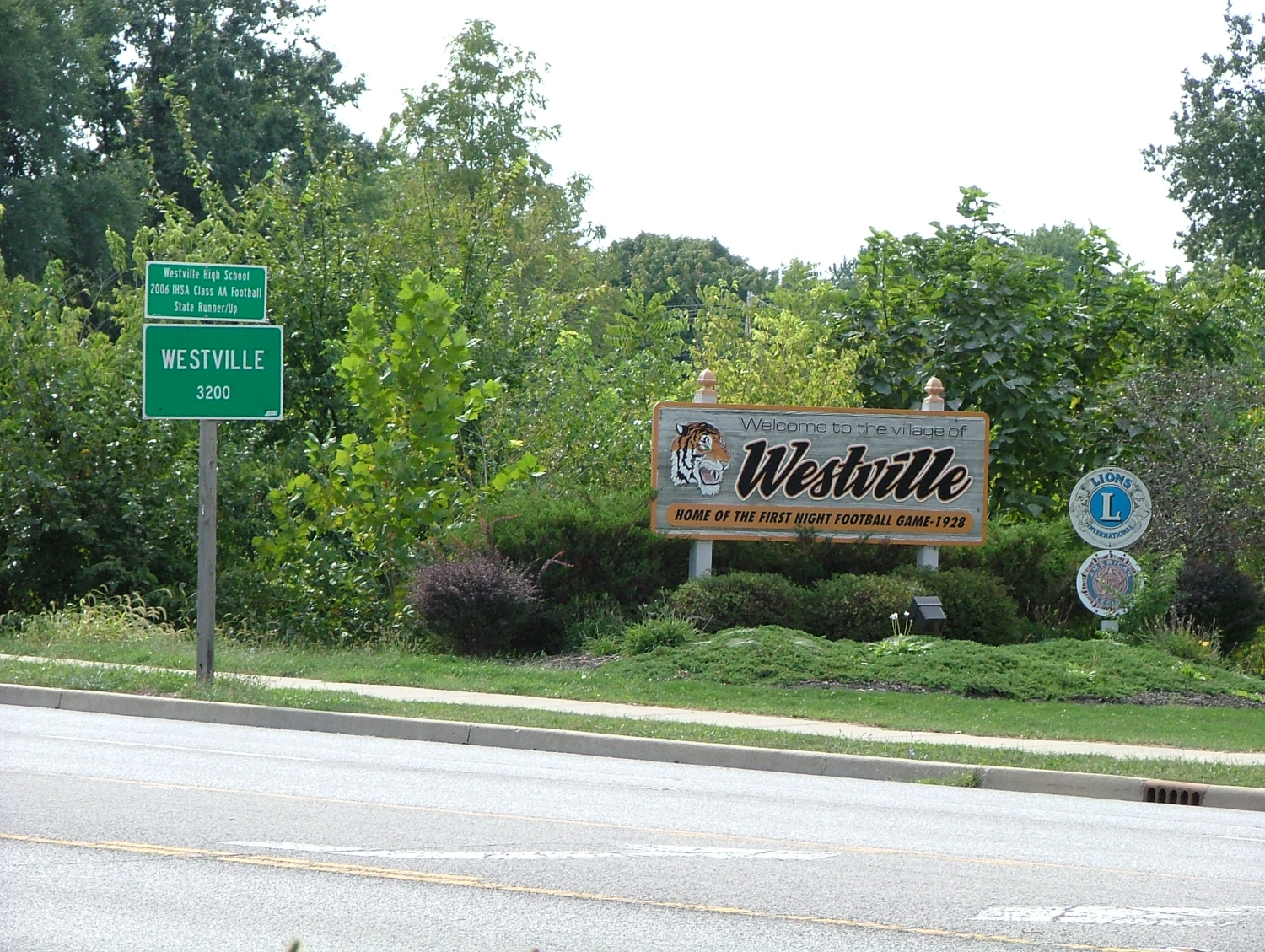
- Signs at the north edge of Westville

- Location of Westville in Vermilion County, Illinois.

- Westville's location in Vermilion County
- Coordinates: 40°02′38″N 87°38′20″W
- Country: United States
- State: Illinois
- County: Vermilion
- Township: Georgetown
- Organized: 1896

Area
  - Total: 1.68 sq mi (4.35 km^{2})
  - Land: 1.68 sq mi (4.35 km^{2})
  - Water: 0 sq mi (0.00 km^{2})
- Elevation: 673 ft (205 m)

Population (2020)
  - Total: 3,167
  - Density: 1,887.0/sq mi (728.56/km^{2})
- Time zone: UTC-6 (CST)
  - Summer (DST): UTC-5 (CDT)
- ZIP code: 61883
- Area code: 217
- FIPS code: 17-80931
- GNIS ID: 2400157
- Website: www.westvilleil.gov

Westville is a village in Georgetown Township, Vermilion County, Illinois, United States. It is part of the Danville, Illinois Metropolitan Statistical Area. As of the 2020 census, Westville had a population of 3,167.

== History ==
The town was laid out in May 1873 by William P. and Elizabeth A. West, although it started out as a station on the Danville and Southwestern Railroad, and there had been settlements in this area prior to the platting. The first known settler was Moses Scott, who purchased land and built a structure in 1827. The post office was established on January 12, 1874. Telephone lines were first installed in 1900, and electricity arrived in 1901.

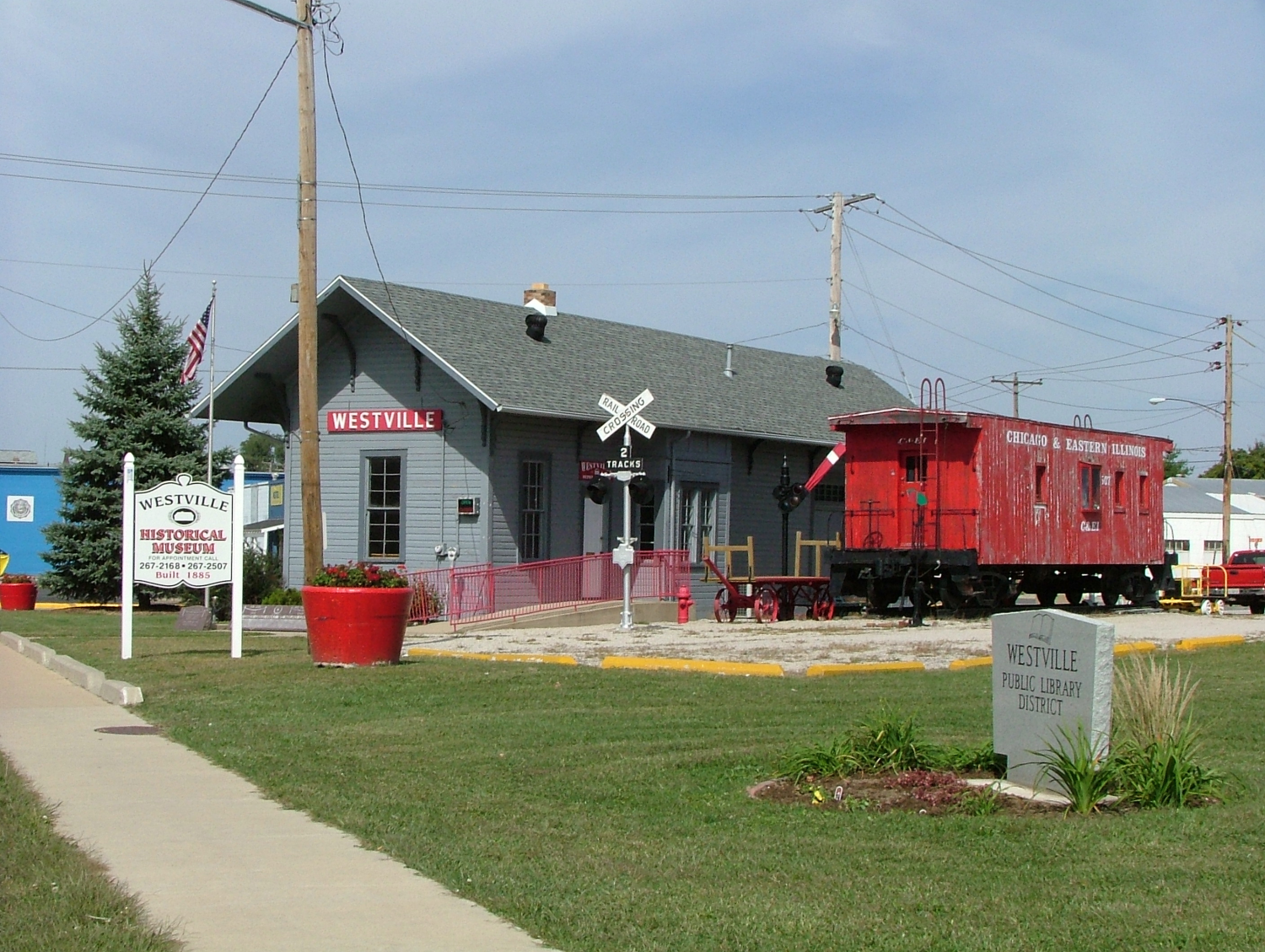
Museum in Westville

During its early days, Westville had many immigrants who lived separately in their own neighborhoods that evoked the tastes, smells, and sounds of different cultures in each neighborhood; the town was known as a "Little Chicago" as it mirrored the different cultures there. Today, many people still carry on the Eastern European names of their ancestors, though it has become more integrated.

Westville played the first regular season night high school football game, that counted towards the season record, under permanent lights, in the United States in 1928. It has been much debated that it was in 1892 in Mansfield, Ohio, but that was not two high schools playing each other and the lights were not permanent. The first night game in Illinois was played in Elgin on October 28, 1898, but again, it was under temporary lighting. Friday Night High School Football, as we know it today, started in Westville, Illinois in 1928.

In 2007, "Remember Westville" was published by author James E. Bryant. The critically acclaimed book chronicled in detail the 1976 Westville Tigers basketball team and their season, as well as a brief history of the village of Westville. Westville finished the season 27–3, garnering a spot in the Illinois High School Association's Sweet Sixteen state tournament. The Tigers lost 67–65 in the final seconds to the eventual state champion, Mt. Pulaski in the Decatur Super Sectional at Milliken University.

Westville is known for its Labor Day celebration. The village celebrates with an annual parade showcasing local businesses, schools, and officials. St. Mary's church also partakes in Labor Day with an International Food Festival and a raffle drawing.

== Geography ==
Westville is located on Illinois Route 1 / U.S. Route 150, about seven miles south of Interstate 74 and the county seat of Danville.

According to the 2010 census, Westville has a total area of 1.68 square miles (4.35 km^{2}), all land.

== Demographics ==
Historical population
Census	Pop.	Note	%±
1900	1,605		—
1910	2,607		62.4%
1920	4,241		62.7%
1930	3,901		−8.0%
1940	3,446		−11.7%
1950	3,196		−7.3%
1960	3,497		9.4%
1970	3,655		4.5%
1980	3,573		−2.2%
1990	3,387		−5.2%
2000	3,175		−6.3%
2010	3,202		0.9%
2020	3,167		−1.1%
U.S. Decennial Census

=== 2020 census ===
As of the 2020 census, Westville had a population of 3,167. The median age was 42.3 years. 23.9% of residents were under the age of 18 and 19.6% of residents were 65 years of age or older. For every 100 females there were 89.1 males, and for every 100 females age 18 and over there were 87.0 males age 18 and over.

98.6% of residents lived in urban areas, while 1.4% lived in rural areas.

There were 1,366 households in Westville, of which 29.3% had children under the age of 18 living in them. Of all households, 42.8% were married-couple households, 18.3% were households with a male householder and no spouse or partner present, and 31.4% were households with a female householder and no spouse or partner present. About 31.0% of all households were made up of individuals and 14.8% had someone living alone who was 65 years of age or older.

There were 1,506 housing units, of which 9.3% were vacant. The homeowner vacancy rate was 1.6% and the rental vacancy rate was 6.5%.

Racial composition as of the 2020 census
Race	Number	Percent
White	2,982	94.2%
Black or African American	32	1.0%
American Indian and Alaska Native	9	0.3%
Asian	11	0.3%
Native Hawaiian and Other Pacific Islander	0	0.0%
Some other race	21	0.7%
Two or more races	112	3.5%
Hispanic or Latino (of any race)	60	1.9%

=== 2000 census ===
As of the census of 2000, there were 3,175 people, 1,420 households, and 903 families residing in the village. The population density was 1,990.6 inhabitants per square mile (768.6/km^{2}). There were 1,537 housing units at an average density of 963.6 per square mile (372.0/km^{2}). The racial makeup of the village was 97.86% White, 0.41% African American, 0.19% Native American, 0.03% Asian, 0.03% Pacific Islander, 0.38% from other races, and 1.10% from two or more races. Hispanic or Latino of any race were 0.76% of the population.

There were 1,420 households, out of which 27.3% had children under the age of 18 living with them, 49.0% were married couples living together, 11.2% had a female householder with no husband present, and 36.4% were non-families. 33.0% of all households were made up of individuals, and 17.0% had someone living alone who was 65 years of age or older. The average household size was 2.24 and the average family size was 2.81.

In the village, the population was spread out, with 22.5% under the age of 18, 7.0% from 18 to 24, 27.0% from 25 to 44, 24.4% from 45 to 64, and 19.1% who were 65 years of age or older. The median age was 41 years. For every 100 females, there were 89.7 males. For every 100 females age 18 and over, there were 86.8 males.

The median income for a household in the village was $34,654, and the median income for a family was $47,083. Males had a median income of $31,694 versus $21,433 for females. The per capita income for the village was $17,538. About 4.7% of families and 7.4% of the population were below the poverty line, including 7.2% of those under age 18 and 5.9% of those age 65 or over.

== Education ==
Westville is served by the Westville Community Unit School District #2, which includes Judith Giacoma Elementary, Westville Junior High School, and Westville High School.

Until 2010, Westville was home to the private, Catholic Preschool-8th Grade institution, Saint Mary's Parish Grade School, but the school has been permanently closed.

== Transportation ==
Danville Mass Transit provides bus service on Route 1 connecting Westville to downtown Danville and other destinations.
