= Sangamon Valley Conference =

High school athletic conference in Illinois, US

- Conference: IHSA
- Founded: 1948
- Folded: 2021
- No. of teams: 7
- Region: North-eastern Illinois

The Sangamon Valley Conference was an IHSA-sanctioned conference in northeastern Illinois established in 1948. The conference hosts primarily 1A-2A schools. It was the first Illinois conference to host an Indiana high school, as South Newton of Kentland, Indiana played from 2015 to 2018 to rejoin the Midwest Athletic Conference. Following the 2020-21 school year the conference disbanded.

== Final members ==
School	Location	Mascot	Colors	County	2017-18 Enrollment	Class	Year Joined	Previous Conference	Conference Joined
Central High School	Clifton, Illinois	Comets		Iroquois	334	2A	1997	River Valley	River Valley Conference
Cissna Park High School^{1}	Cissna Park, Illinois	Timberwolves		Iroquois	99	1A	1999	Iroquois	Vermilion Valley Conference
Dwight High School	Dwight, Illinois	Trojans		Livingston	258	1A	2014	Interstate Eight	Tri-County Conference
Iroquois West High School	Gilman, Illinois	Raiders		Iroquois	281	1A	1993	Iroquois	Vermilion Valley Conference
Momence High School	Momence, Illinois	Redskins		Kankakee	339	2A	2006	River Valley	River Valley Conference
Watseka Community High School	Watseka, Illinois	Warriors		Iroquois	348	2A	1997	River Valley	Vermilion Valley Conference

1. was called Crescent-Iroquois-Cissna Park as the host in a co-op with Crescent-Iroquois (based in Crescent City until Crescent City-Iroquois consolidated into Cissna Park in 2009.

== Former Members ==
School	Location	Mascot	Colors	County	Year Joined	Previous Conference	Year Left	Conference Joined
Argenta-Oreana High School	Argenta, Illinois	Bombers		Macon	1971		1983	
Armstrong High School	Armstrong, Illinois	Trojans		Vermilion	1999		2004	Vermilion Valley
Bellflower High School	Bellflower, Illinois	Dragons		McLean	1948	Tri-Valley	1985	none (consolidated into Blue Ridge
Blue Ridge High School	Farmer City, Illinois	Knights		DeWitt	1985	none (new school)	2006	Heart of Illinois
DeLand-Weldon High School^{1}	De Land, Illinois	Eagles		Piatt	1948		1983	Kickapoo
Fairbury-Cropsey High School	Fairbury, Illinois	Tartars		Livingston	1971	Mid State	1985	none (consolidated into Prairie Central
Farmer City High School	Farmer City, Illinois	Farmers		DeWitt	1948		1971	none (consolidated into Farmer City-Mansfield)
Farmer City-Mansfield High School	Farmer City, Illinois	Blue Devils		DeWitt	1971	none (new school)	1985	none (consolidated into Blue Ridge)
Fisher High School	Fisher, Illinois	Bunnies		Champaign	1949		2006	Heart of Illinois
Ford Central High School	Piper City, Illinois	Cougars		Ford	1989	Vermilion Valley	1992	none (consolidated into Tri-Point)
Forrest-Strawn-Wing High School	Forrest, Illinois	Eskimos		Livingston	1983	Vermilion Valley	1985	none (consolidated into Prairie Central
Gibson City High School	Gibson City, Illinois	Greyhounds		Ford	1990	Wauseca	1993	none (consolidated into Gibson City-Melvin-Sibley)
Gibson City-Melvin-Sibley High School	Gibson City, Illinois	Falcons		Ford	1993	none (new school)	2006	Heart of Illinois
Heyworth High School	Heyworth, Illinois	Hornets		McLean	1955		1997	Mid State
Hoopeston Area High School	Hoopeston, Illinois	Cornjerkers		Vermilion	1997		2004	Vermilion Valley
LeRoy High School	LeRoy, Illinois	Panthers		McLean	1948		2006	Heart of Illinois
Mahomet-Seymour High School	Mahomet, Illinois	Bulldogs		Champaign	1948		1976	Okaw Valley
Mansfield High School	Mansfield, Illinois	Cardinals		Piatt	1948		1971	none (consolidated into Farmer City-Mansfield)
Milford High School	Milford, Illinois	Bearcats		Iroquois	1997		2006	Vermilion Valley
Octavia High School	Colfax, Illinois	Rockets		McLean	1955	Kickapoo	1989	none (consolidated into Ridgeview)
Ridgeview High School	Colfax, Illinois	Mustangs		McLean	1989	none (new school)	1997	Mid State
Rossville-Alvin High School	Rossville, Illinois	Bobcats		Vermilion	1997		2005	none (consolidated into Hoopeston)
St. Joseph-Ogden High School	St. Joseph, Illinois	Spartans		Champaign	2006		2014	Okaw Valley
St. Thomas More High School	Champaign, Illinois	Sabers		Champaign	2004		2014	Okaw Valley
Saybrook-Arrowsmith High School	Saybrook, Illinois	Comanches		McLean	1955	Kickapoo	1976	Kickapoo
South Newton High School	Kentland, Indiana	Rebels		Newton (IN)	2015	Midwest (IN)	2018	Midwest (IN)
Tri-Point High School	Cullom, Illinois	Chargers		Livingston	2006	Mid State	2011	River Valley
Tri-Valley High School	Downs, Illinois	Vikings		McLean	1983		2006	Heart of Illinois
University High School	Urbana, Illinois	Illineks		Champaign	1997		2003	East Central Illini
Wapella High School	Wapella, Illinois	Wildcats		DeWitt	1949		1955	Kickapoo
Weldon High School	Weldon, Illinois	Wildcats		DeWitt	1948		1949	none (consolidated into DeLand-Weldon)
Paxton-Buckley-Loda High School	Paxton, Illinois	Panthers		Ford	1990	Wauseca	2021	Illini Prairie

1. DeLand-Weldon was known as DeLand before 1949.
