= Vermilion Valley Conference =

High school conference in Illinois

- Conference: IHSA
- Founded: 2003
- No. of teams: 13
- Region: East-central Illinois (Edgar, Iroquois and Vermilion counties)
- Official website: Vermilion Valley Conference

Locations
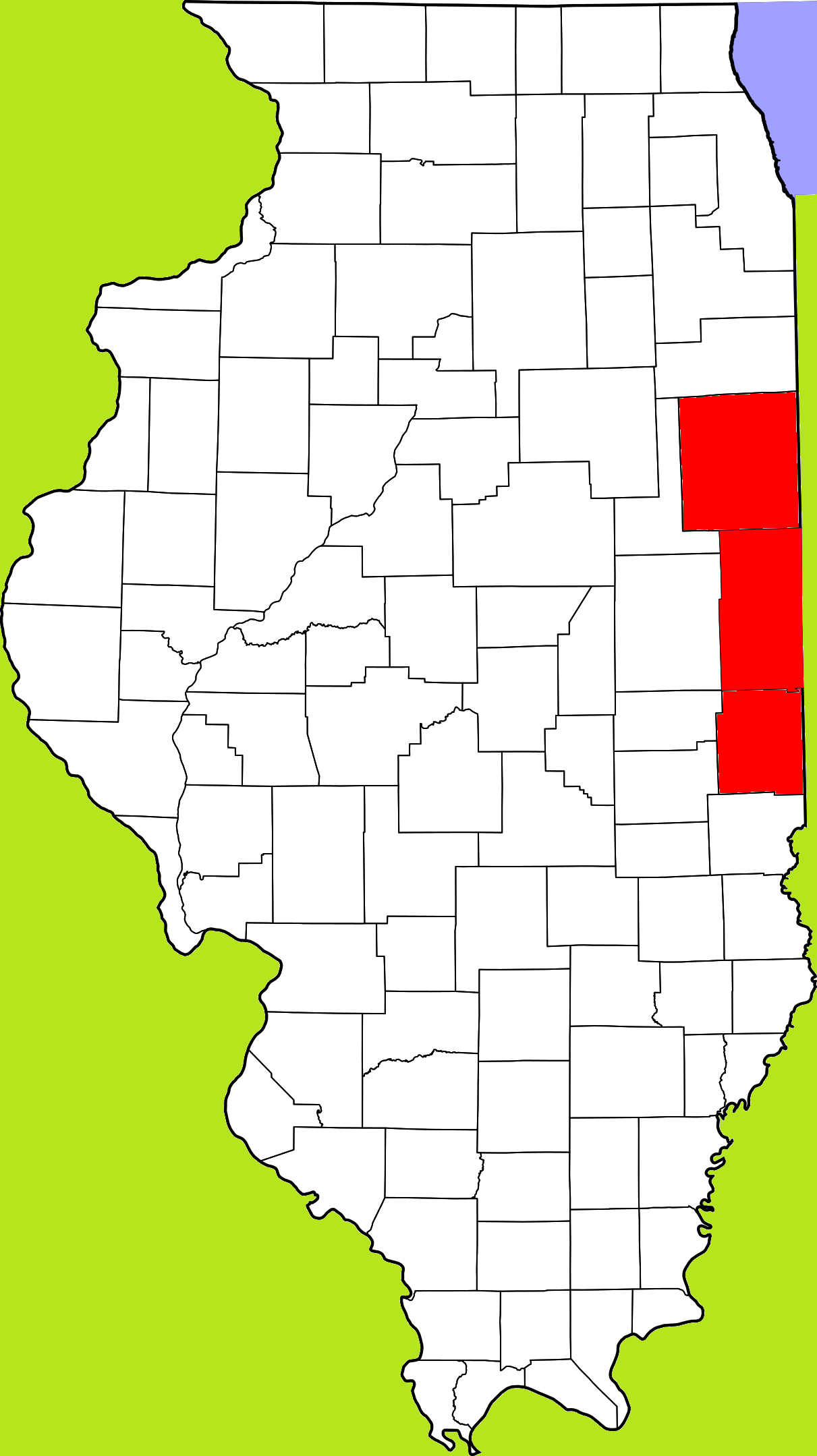
- The Vermilion Valley Conference within Illinois

Locations of Vermilion Valley Schools

The Vermilion Valley Conference is a high school conference in east-central Illinois, in the United States. The conference participates in athletics and activities in the Illinois High School Association. The conference comprises 13 small public high schools and one small private school, with enrollments between 100 and 400 students in Edgar, Iroquois and Vermilion counties.

== History ==
The original Vermilion Valley Conference was founded in 1933 with schools from Ford, Grundy, Iroquois, Livingston, and Kankakee counties in east-central Illinois. The five charter members included: Chatsworth, Cullom, Forrest Township, Herscher, and Saunemin. This version of the Vermilion Valley disbanded in 1989.

The Vermilion Valley Conference was resurrected in 2003 with a new group of high schools. The charter members of the "new" Vermilion Valley included: Armstrong, Bismarck Henning, Chrisman, Georgetown-Ridge Farm, Hoopeston Area, Oakwood, Rossville-Alvin, Salt Fork, Schlarman and Westville High Schools. In 2005, Rossville-Alvin High School closed and with the students attending Bismarck Henning, however, Milford joined the league the following year.

In 2020, the conference expanded its football presence by adding several schools from other conferences into a "football only", two division league. Schools from the Tri-County Conference; including Dwight and Seneca, as well as Clifton Central, Iroquois West and Watseka from the Sangamon Valley Conference united under the Vermilion Valley moniker. The two divisions included a North Division of Seneca, Momence, Dwight, Clifton Central, Watseka and Iroquois West and a South Division of Hoopeston Area, Georgetown-Ridge Farm, Westville, Bismarck-Henning-Rossville-Alvin, Salt Fork and Oakwood. This unusual mix of three conferences only lasted two years with the development of the Chicago Prairie Football League.

In 2021, the Sangamon Valley Conference disbanded, therefore, Cissna Park, Iroquois West, and Watseka Community High Schools joined as full members of the Vermilion Valley, taking the total number of teams up to 13.

Currently, the league consists of the following teams: Armstrong, Bismarck-Henning-Rossville-Alvin, Catlin-Salt Fork, Chrisman, Cissna Park, Danville-Schlarman, Fithian-Oakwood, Georgetown-Ridge Farm, Gilman-Iroquois West, Hoopeston Area, Milford, Watseka and Westville

== Member schools ==
School	Location	County	Mascot	Colors	Joined	Enrollment	IHSA Classes 1/2/3/4	IHSA Football Class	IHSA Football Type	Coop/Team
Armstrong Township	Armstrong, IL	Vermilion	Trojans	Purple, Gold	2003	136	A/1A/1A	3A	11-Man	Yes; Hoopeston
Bismarck Henning Rossville-Alvin	Bismarck, IL	Vermilion	Blue Devils	Blue, Silver, White	2003	338	A/1A/1A	2A	11-Man	None
Salt Fork	Catlin, IL	Vermilion	Storm	Black, Silver, White	2003	254	A/1A/1A	1A	11-Man	None
Chrisman	Chrisman, IL	Edgar	Cardinals	Red, Black	2003	100	A/1A/1A	2A	11-Man	Yes; Georgetown-Ridge Farm
Cissna Park	Cissna Park, IL	Iroquois	Timberwolves	Navy Blue, Silver, Columbia Blue	2021	99	A/1A/1A	1A	8-Man	Yes; Milford
Schlarman	Danville, IL	Vermilion	Hilltoppers	Blue, Gold	2003	145	A/1A/1A	1A	8-Man	None
Oakwood	Fithian, IL	Vermilion	Comets	Purple, White	2003	305	A/1A/1A	1A/2A	11-man	None
Georgetown-Ridge Farm	Georgetown, IL	Vermilion	Buffaloes	Purple, Gold, White	2003	277	A/1A/1A	2A	11-Man	Yes; Chrisman
Hoopeston Area	Hoopeston, IL	Vermilion	Cornjerkers	Blue, White	2003	320	A/1A/1A	3A	11-Man	Yes; Armstrong
Iroquois West	Gilman, IL	Iroquois	Raiders	Blue, Red, White	2021	310	A/1A/1A	1A/2A	11-man	None
Milford	Milford, IL	Iroquois	Bearcats; Lady Bearcats	Blue, White	2006	174	A/1A/1A	1A	8-Man	Yes; Cissna Park
Watseka	Watseka, IL	Iroquois	Warriors	Maroon, White	2021	300	A/1A/1A	1A/2A	11-man	None
Westville	Westville, IL	Vermilion	Tigers; Lady Tigers	Orange, Black	2003	370	A/1A/1A	2A	11-man	None

== Previous Members ==
School	Location	Mascot	Colors	Year Joined	Year Exited	School In Use	Consolidated Closed	Current District/Conference
Chatsworth	Chatsworth, IL	Bluebirds	Blue, Orange	1933	1985	No	Consolidated	Prairie Central
Cullom Community	Cullom, IL	Ramblers	Blue, White	1933	1968	Yes	Consolidated	Tri-Point
Forrest Township	Forrest, IL	Eskimos	Red, Black, White	1933	1949	No	Consolidated; Forrest-Strawn-Wing	Prairie Central
Herscher	Herscher, IL	Tigers	Gold, Black	1933	1956	Yes	Left the Conference	Illinois Central Eight Conference
Saunemin	Saunemin, IL	Eagles	Purple, White	1933	1987	No	Closed	Pontiac Township
Kempton	Kempton, IL	Red Devils	Red, White	1939	1946	No	Consolidated; Kempton-Cabery	Tri-Point
Piper City	Piper City, IL	Blue Streaks	Blue, White	1939	1974	Yes	Consolidated; Ford Central	Tri-Point
Ford Central	Piper City, IL	Cougars	Columbia Blue, Gold	1939	1983	Yes	Consolidated	Tri-Point
Reddick	Reddick, IL	Bulldogs	Orange, Black, White	1939	1944	No	Left the Conference	Herscher
Onarga	Onarga, IL	Indians	Maroon, White	1941	1983	Yes	Consolidated	Iroquois West
Kempton-Cabery	Kempton, IL	Komanches	Red, Black, White	1946	1968	Yes	Consolidated	Tri-Point
Forrest-Strawn-Wing	Forrest, IL	Eskimos	Red, Black, White	1949	1985	No	Consolidated	Prairie Central
Roberts-Thawville	Roberts, IL	Leprechauns	Green, White	1953	1974	No	Consolidated; Ford Central	Tri-Point
Melvin-Sibley	Melvin, IL	Rams	Orange, Black	1956	1988	No	Consolidated	Gibson City-Melvin-Sibley
Onarga Military	Onarga, IL	YellowJackets; Spartans	Purple, Gold	1956	1970	No	Closed	Iroquois West
Reddick R.U.C.E.	Reddick, IL	Bulldogs	Orange, Black, White	1962	1988	No	Consolidated	Herscher
Gilman	Gilman, IL	Owls	Red, Blue	1962	1983	Yes	Consolidated	Iroquois West
Tri-Point	Cullom, IL	Chargers	Scarlet, White, Royal	1968	1988	Yes	Conference; Disbanded	River Valley Conference
Cornell	Cornell, IL	Cardinals	Maroon, White	1972	1987	No	Consolidated	Flanagan-Cornell
Milford	Milford, IL	Bearcats; Lady Bearcats	Blue, White	1972	1982	Yes	Left the Conference	Vermilion Valley Conference
Gardner-South Wilmington	Gardner, IL	Panthers; Lady Panthers	Orange, Black	1986	1988	Yes	Conference; Disbanded	River Valley Conference
Mazon-Verona-Kinsman	Mazon, IL	Red Devils	Red, White	1986	1988	Yes	Consolidated	Seneca

Sources:IHSA Conferences, and IHSA Member Schools Directory

== Membership timeline ==
Vermilion Valley (Original) Vermilion Valley (Current)
