= Mid State Conference =

Defunct American high-school athletic conference

- Conference: IHSA
- Founded: 1949
- Folded: 2006
- No. of teams: 15 (total)
- Region: Central Illinois (Iroquois, LaSalle, Livingston, McLean, Tazewell, and Woodford counties)

The Mid State Conference was a high school conference in central Illinois. The conference participated in athletics and activities in the Illinois High School Association. The conference comprised 15 small public high schools, with enrollments between 60 and 340 students in Iroquois, LaSalle, Livingston, McLean, Tazewell, and Woodford counties.

== History ==
The first year of competition for the Mid State was 1949 with eight charter schools: Chenoa, Cornell, El Paso, Fairbury, Flanagan, Gridley, Lexington and Minonk-Dana. In 1951, Fairbury merged with Cropsey High School and remained in the conference as Fairbury-Cropsey High School. Additionally, in 1955, Minonk-Dana consolidated with Rutland High School, again, maintaining a league with eight school. Unfortunately, in 1957, Fairbury-Cropsey left for the short-lived United Conference. For seven years the conference maintained seven schools, however in 1964, Streator Woodland joined the league. Cornell dropped football in 1971, but Deer Creek-Mackinaw was added in 1972 to round out the league again with eight. Gridley dropped football briefly in 1984, but resumed the program in 1986. Cornell would consolidate their enrollment into Flanagan High School in 1987, reducing the number of schools to seven, again. In 1992, Minonk-Dana-Rutland consolidated with a neighboring districts Toluca, and Wenona to become known as Fieldcrest, but remained in the Mid State.

For over 40 years the Mid State Conference maintained seven or eight schools with very few exceptions, however in 1995, Cullom Tri-Point and Tremont joined the league taking the total to 10. Additionally, Colfax Ridgeview and Heyworth would join in 1997, taking the total number of schools to 12. The league would remain at 12 until 2004 when El Paso and Gridley consolidated and Chenoa High School consolidated with Prairie Central. Prairie Central already included a former league member, Fairbury-Cropsey, who in 1985 consolidated with Forrest-Strawn-Wing High School and Chatsworth High Schools.

In the early 2000s, talks began to join forces with the Sangamon Valley Conference in order to create a league with divisions based on enrollment. This conference would be known as the Heart of Illinois and was formed in 2006, thus ending the 56 year old run for the Mid State.

Locations of Mid State Conference Schools

== All-time membership ==
School	Location	Mascot	Colors	County	Year Joined	Year Left	Still Open	Consolidated / School	Conference Joined
Chenoa High School	Chenoa, Illinois	Redbirds		McLean	1949	2004	Yes	Yes / Prairie Central	Corn Belt
Cornell High School	Cornell, Illinois	Cardinals		Livingston	1949	1987	No	Yes / Flanagan-Cornell	—
Flanagan High School	Flanagan, Illinois	Falcons		Livingston	1949	1987	Yes	Yes / Flanagan-Cornell	—
Flanagan-Cornell High School	Flanagan, Illinois	Falcons		Livingston	1987	2006	Yes	No	Heart of Illinois
El Paso High School	El Paso, Illinois	Comets		McLean	1949	2004	Yes	Yes / El Paso-Gridley	Heart of Illinois
Gridley High School	Gridley, Illinois	Redskins		McLean	1949	2004	No	Yes / El Paso-Gridley	Heart of Illinois
Fairbury High School	Fairbury, Illinois	Tartars		Livingston	1949	1951	Yes	Yes / Fairbury-Cropsey	—
Fairbury-Cropsey High School	Fairbury, Illinois	Tartars		Livingston	1951	1957	Yes	Yes / Prairie Central	United
Lexington High School	Lexington, Illinois	Minutemen		McLean	1949	2006	Yes	No	Heart of Illinois
Minonk-Dana High School	Minonk, Illinois	Mohawks		Woodford	1949	1955	Yes	Yes / Minonk-Dana-Rutland	Heart of Illinois
Minonk-Dana-Rutland High School	Minonk, Illinois	Mohawks		Woodford	1955	1992	Yes	Yes / Fieldcrest	Heart of Illinois
Fieldcrest High School	Minonk, Illinois	Knights		Woodford	1992	2006	Yes	No	Heart of Illinois
Woodland High School	Streator, Illinois	Warriors		Livingston	1964	2006	Yes	No	Tri-County
Deer Creek-Mackinaw High School	Mackinaw, Illinois	Chiefs		Tazewell	1972	2006	Yes	No	Heart of Illinois
Tri-Point High School	Cullom, Illinois	Chargers		Livingston	1995	2006	Yes	No	Sangamon Valley
Tremont High School	Tremont, Illinois	Turks		Tazewell	1995	2006	Yes	No	Heart of Illinois
Ridgeview High School	Colfax, Illinois	Mustangs		McLean	1997	2006	Yes	No	Heart of Illinois
Heyworth High School	Heyworth, Illinois	Hornets		McLean	1997	2006	Yes	No	Heart of Illinois

Sources:IHSA Conferences, and IHSA Member Schools Directory A History of Minonk Schools

=== Membership timeline ===
Full members Sources:Illinois High School Glory Days,
