= Heart of Illinois Conference =

- Conference: IHSA
- Founded: 2006
- No. of teams: 13
- Region: Central Illinois

The Heart of Illinois Conference is a Central Illinois based high school athletic conference in the Illinois High School Association (IHSA).

== History ==
The conference was formed in 2006 from members of the Mid State and Sangamon Valley conferences. Eureka High School joined the conference in 2016 from the Corn Belt Conference. The conference is divided into large and small divisions with Deer Creek-Mackinaw (Dee-Mack), El Paso-Gridley (EP-G), Eureka, Gibson City-Melvin-Sibley (GCMS), Heyworth, Tremont, and Tri-Valley composing the large division and Fieldcrest, Fisher, Flanagan-Cornell, Lexington, LeRoy, and Ridgeview composing the small division. Blue Ridge was a part of the Small Division until 2018, when it left for the Little Okaw Valley Conference in 2018.

Locations of Heart of Illinois Schools

== Member schools ==
School	Community	Mascot	Colors	2017-18 Enrollment	School type	Year joined	Previous conference
Deer Creek-Mackinaw High School	Mackinaw, Illinois	Chiefs		330	Public	2006	Mid State
El Paso-Gridley High School	El Paso, Illinois	Titans		374	Public	2006	Mid State
Eureka High School	Eureka, Illinois	Hornets		492	Public	2016	Corn Belt
Fieldcrest High School	Minonk, Illinois	Knights		337	Public	2006	Mid State
Flanagan-Cornell High School	Flanagan, Illinois	Falcons		146	Public	2006	Mid State
GCMS High School	Gibson City, Illinois	Falcons		328	Public	2006	Sangamon Valley
Heyworth High School	Heyworth, Illinois	Hornets		270	Public	2006	Mid State
Le Roy High School	Le Roy, Illinois	Panthers		231	Public	2006	Sangamon Valley
Lexington High School	Lexington, Illinois	Minutemen		137	Public	2006	Mid State
Ridgeview High School	Colfax, Illinois	Mustangs		149	Public	2006	Mid State
Tremont High School	Tremont, Illinois	Turks		299	Public	2006	Mid State
Tri-Valley High School	Downs, Illinois	Vikings		341	Public	2006	Sangamon Valley

=== Former Members ===
School	Community	Mascot	Colors	Year joined	Previous conference	Year left	Conference joined
Blue Ridge High School	Farmer City, Illinois	Knights		2006	Sangamon Valley	2018	Little Okaw Valley

| Fisher High School | Fisher, Illinois | Bunnies | | 186 | Public | 2006 | Sangamon Valley | Lincoln Prairie Conference | 2026
