= River Valley Conference (Illinois) =

Merged from Iroquois and Vermilion Valley conferences

- Conference: IHSA
- Founded: 1940
- Sports fielded: 5
- No. of teams: 10
- Region: Illinois

The River Valley Conference is a high school sports Conference in northeastern and two high schools in a southern suburbs is "Illinois Lutheran and Beecher High School in Illinois, United States. The conference is part of the Illinois High School Association. The conference started around 1940 as the Kankakee Valley Conference, making up schools from the Kankakee County and Will County area. The conference had split into two divisions (Kan-Will and Will-Ro-Kee) in 1953 to make football scheduling more manageable, but maintained the conference in basketball and other sports. With the Iroquois and Vermilion Valley conferences folding, the KVC took on some of their members, prompting the change to its current name. The biggest shift since then occurred in 2006, as its larger schools left to join schools with similar membership, leaving the RVC as a rural, smaller school conference. In 2020, Grace Christian became a full IHSA member, and joined the RVC. This brought the number of teams up to eight. Momence and Clifton Central are set to join the RVC in 2021, due to the dissolving of the Sangamon Valley Conference. This will bring the conference up to 10 teams.

== Membership ==
=== Current ===
School	Location	Mascot	Colors	Areas	County	IHSA Enrollment	Class	Year Joined	Previous Conference
Beecher	Beecher	Bobcats		South Suburbs	Will	334	2A	pre-1948	
Clifton Central	Clifton	Comets		East Illinois	Iroquois	278	2A	2021	Sangamon Valley
Donovan	Donovan	Wildcats		East Illinois	Iroquois	71	1A	1989	Iroquois
Gardner-South Wilmington	Gardner	Panthers		Northeast Illinois	Grundy	153	1A	1989	Vermilion Valley
Grace Christian Academy	Kankakee	Crusaders		East Illinois	Kankakee	71	1A	2020	
Grant Park	Grant Park	Dragons		East Illinois	Kankakee	126	1A	pre-1948	
Illinois Lutheran	Crete	Chargers		South Suburbs	Will	86	1A	2006	Tollway
Momence	Momence	Redskins		East Illinois	Kankakee	302	2A	2021	Sangamon Valley
St. Anne	St. Anne	Cardinals		East Illinois	Kankakee	206	1A	pre-1948	
Tri-Point	Cullom	Chargers		East Illinois	Livingston	97	1A	2011	Sangamon Valley

=== Former ===
Note: records before 1948-49 are incomplete. Some teams may have played in the conference before the date recorded, other schools may have played in the conference's early years.

School	Location	Mascot	Colors	County	Year Joined	Previous Conference	Year Left	Conference Joined
Bonfield	Bonfield	Braves		Kankakee	pre-1940		1941	none (consolidated into Reddick)
Crete-Monee^{1}	Crete	Warriors		Will	1940	none (new school)	1962	Southeast Suburban
R.U.C.E.^{2}	Reddick	Bulldogs		Kankakee	1944		1956	Northeast
Bishop McNamara^{3}	Kankakee	Irish		Kankakee	pre-1948		1989	Chicago Catholic
Bradley-Bourbonnais	Bradley	Boilermakers		Kankakee	pre-1948		1962	Southeast Suburban
Gilman	Gilman	Owls		Iroquois	pre-1948		1962	Vermilion Valley
Manteno	Manteno	Panthers		Kankakee	pre-1948		2006	Interstate 8
Momence	Momence	Redskins		Kankakee	pre-1948		2006	Sangamon Valley
Peotone	Peotone	Blue Devils		Will	pre-1948		2006	Interstate 8
Central	Clifton	Comets		Iroquois	1950	none (new school)	1980	Wauseca
Herscher^{4}	Herscher	Tigers		Kankakee	1950	Vermilion Valley	2006	Interstate 8

1. Known as Crete until 1948.
2. Known as Reddick until 1950.
3. Known as St. Patrick until 1955.
4. Herscher played concurrently in the KVC and VVC from 1950 to 1954.

== See also ==
- List of Illinois High School Association member conferences
