= Nixon Township, DeWitt County, Illinois =

Nixon Township
- Township
- Location in DeWitt County

- DeWitt County's location in Illinois http://www.archive.org/stream/honortoourherita00weld/honortoourherita00weld_djvu.txt https://dewitt.illinoisgenweb.org/nixon.htm
- Coordinates: 40°06′22″N 88°45′18″W
- Country: United States
- State: Illinois
- County: DeWitt
- Established: November 2, 1858

Area
  - Total: 27.53 sq mi (71.3 km^{2})
  - Land: 27.53 sq mi (71.3 km^{2})
  - Water: 0 sq mi (0 km^{2}) 0%
- Elevation: 709 ft (216 m)

Population (2020)
  - Total: 492
  - Density: 17.9/sq mi (6.90/km^{2})
- Time zone: UTC-6 (CST)
  - Summer (DST): UTC-5 (CDT)
- ZIP code: 61882
- FIPS code: 17-039-53117
- GNIS feature ID: 429449

Nixon Township is one of thirteen townships in DeWitt County, Illinois, US. As of the 2020 census, its population was 492 and it contained 231 housing units.

The last settled township in DeWitt County was Nixon. The first settlement began in 1850 and the first to locate in this township was Cicero Twist in the spring of 1850. He settled in Section 8 and that year broke a small patch of prairie and raised a crop of sod corn. There had been land cultivated within its boundaries, years before but by parties living outside the immediate area not citizens of the township. Milo Twist, one of eight, was the first white child born in the township and the Twist family lived in a crude cabin constructed of rough logs just as they were cut from native timber.

George, William and Morris Nixon were also some of the most early settlers of the area. They were brothers and came from Ohio in the year 1850, settling in different parts of the township. William Nixon and Smith Fuller of DeWitt Township rode on horseback to Houston, Texas, in 1856 to buy 500 sheep each. They drove the one thousand head of sheep back to eastern DeWitt County and were the first farmers in the community to have cattle and sheep grazing on the prairies where Weldon now stands. A.M Pue broke the first prairie sod and raised the first crop of corn. In 1859, at the time of the township organization, the commissioners gave the township the name of Nixon in their honor.

John Manlove and a brother-in-law, Hiram Chandler, were also early citizens. C S Lisenby improved land in the early days of the township but resided in Creek Township. A Rush and Kate Shipman were the first couple married in the township.

John McGinnis was the first postmaster of Nixon Township. The post office was located and housed in a room of an old house on the farm where Duane Riddle later lived in the 20th century. Grains of corn, wheat and oats were to become the main cash crops and were delivered to market by wagon westerly to Clinton and northeast to Mt. Pleasant (later changed to Farmer City). During the frozen seasons, delivery was made to Decatur by wagon on roads, or sled on the ice of Friends Creek, running in a southerly direction to the Sangamon River, and to the processing plant of A E. Staley Co Grain. Cattle were also hauled and driven overland to Chicago. On one crossroad a store, blacksmith shop and a schoolhouse formed the first settlement of Shoo Fly and was directly northeast of the present village of Weldon.

With many bushels of grain and many head of cattle to be marketed, accompanied by a demand for raw materials, a railroad was soon found to be needed. At this time the government entered the picture and gave every sixth mile of land to a division of the Wabash, St Louis & Pacific Railway. This was used to form a railroad called "The Peanut Line," which ran from Champaign to Havana, Illinois, a total of 110 miles. The history of this railroad dates from the incorporation of the Monticello Railroad Co. on February 21, 1861. The line from White Heath to Havana, an extension from Monticello to Decatur, was completed by the Havana, Mason City, Lincoln & Eastern Railroad.

The village there was named in honor of Lawrence Weldon, a prominent lawyer of Bloomington, Illinois, who was also an attorney for the railroad, and took an active part in determining where the railroad would be built.

In 1872 a town of Weldon was laid out adjacent to the railroad, and stores were built one block north of the present main street. This section was destroyed by fire in the summer of 1879 and new stores were built at the present location. The village of Weldon, Illinois, was surveyed and platted by surveyor John Brown, in the spring of 1872. It was placed on record in the fall of 1873, by Colonel Thomas Snell, Charles S. Lisenby, James Alexander and James DeLand. Charles S. Lisenby, rich landowner, sold his land in parts, invested in and helped develop the village of Weldon.

The first two-story home was built by Lisenby in 1872. The first church started in 1872, on land donated by Colonel Snell, for that purpose. The first store was built in 1873. The Winslow Brothers operated this store. The first stock consisted of drugs and groceries, but soon merged into a general store. The building was a framed construction, 20 by 60 feet and two stories high. It was located between Water and North Street. It was destroyed by fire in the summer of 1879. The next stores were built on the next block south, which is known as High or Main Street.

Grains of corn, wheat and oats were to become the main cash crops and were delivered to market by wagon westerly to Clinton and northeast to Mt. Pleasant (later changed to Farmer City). During the frozen seasons, delivery was made to Decatur by wagon on roads, or sled on the ice of Friends Creek, running in a southerly direction to the Sangamon River, and to the processing plant of A E. Staley Co Grain. Cattle were also hauled and driven overland to Chicago. On one crossroad a store, blacksmith shop and a schoolhouse formed the first settlement of Shoo Fly and was directly northeast of the present village of Weldon.

The next several years Weldon was a very progressive little town. It boasted two hotels, two general stores, a grocer, two restaurants, a confectionery, a meat market, a drug store, one millinery shop, operated by Nora Reed (Baker), two barber shops, a lumber and coal yard and three grain elevators. The first blacksmith shop was built in 1873. It was operated by James Paulson. The first hotel was built and operated by John Bennett in 1874. The first postmaster of Weldon was J. C. Coulter, in 1873. The post office was located in the depot. At that time, Weldon's inhabitants numbered about 600. It was one of the most progressive and best conducted villages of its size in the state. C. J. Seaborg was the operator of a wagon and carriage factory, established in 1874. It is said that some of Weldon's first autos were assembled in his shop. There were stockyards in the west part of town, J.H. Scott and Robert Given being two of the early buyers, driving the livestock to town on foot. Mrs. J.T. Thomas owned a loom and in her home she wove many rag carpels, which were sold around Weldon. Mr. George W. Baker sold furniture, farm implements, silverware, jewelry, etc., in his store. Mr. Baker was also the local undertaker. There was also a men's clothing store for many years. A bank was first organized as a private concern by Jacob Swigart in 1887. It was later organized as a state bank in 1906, with Carl Swigart as president, D.M. Smallwood, vice president, H.T. Swigart, cashier, and Charles C. Lisenby, assistant cashier.

Weldon was incorporated in 1892. The first meeting of the board of trustees of the village was held in Worship Gray's office, August 15, 1892. T.C. Byland presided, A.M. Drew, C.J. Seaborg, Robert Given and J.H. Scott were the board members, with C.L. Townsend as clerk. On a motion by Dr. Drew, seconded by C.J. Seaborg, a committee was appointed to draft a municipal code for the government of the village of Weldon. Robert Given, T.C. Byland and J.M. Scott were appointed to draft this code. It was voted that the ordinance of Clinton be adopted as much as would pertain to the village of Weldon. The records show that T.C. Byland was paid $15.00 for writing it. Plans were soon made to build many board walks, also a town house, a prison or a calaboose. A calaboose was needed as there were three saloons at this time or soon after. The calaboose was built on a lot belonging to William Gray, purchased by the village for $25.00. Labor to build the building was $23.75. The lumber was hauled from Clinton, with horses.

More information may be found at https://dewitt.illinoisgenweb.org/nixon.htm and at http://www.archive.org/stream/honortoourherita00weld/honortoourherita00weld_djvu.txt

== Geography ==
According to the 2021 census gazetteer files, Nixon Township has a total area of 27.53 square miles (71.30 km^{2}), all land.

=== Cities, towns, villages ===
- Weldon

=== Airports and landing strips ===
- Bakers Strip - Permanently Closed

== Demographics ==
Historical population
Census	Pop.	Note	%±
1930	1,015		—
1940	935		−7.9%
1950	881		−5.8%
1960	794		−9.9%
1970	774		−2.5%
1980	720		−7.0%
1990	579		−19.6%
2000	574		−0.9%
2010	571		−0.5%
2020	492		−13.8%

As of the 2020 census there were 492 people, 222 households, and 139 families residing in the township. The population density was 17.87 inhabitants per square mile (6.90/km^{2}). There were 231 housing units at an average density of

8.39 per square mile (3.24/km^{2}). The racial makeup of the township was 95.73% White, 0.00% African American, 0.00% Native American, 0.20% Asian, 0.00% Pacific Islander, 0.20% from other races, and 3.86% from two or more races. Hispanic or Latino of any race were 0.61% of the population.

There were 222 households, out of which 24.80% had children under the age of 18 living with them, 44.59% were married couples living together, 12.16% had a female householder with no spouse present, and 37.39% were non-families. 35.10% of all households were made up of individuals, and 13.50% had someone living alone who was 65 years of age or older. The average household size was 2.25 and the average family size was 2.83.

The township's age distribution consisted of 20.2% under the age of 18, 3.2% from 18 to 24, 17.8% from 25 to 44, 32.4% from 45 to 64, and 26.3% who were 65 years of age or older. The median age was 53.0 years. For every 100 females, there were 152.0 males. For every 100 females age 18 and over, there were 135.5 males.

The median income for a household in the township was $57,917, and the median income for a family was $70,139. Males had a median income of $46,625 versus $27,353 for females. The per capita income for the township was $29,525. About 8.6% of families and 10.2% of the population were below the poverty line, including 13.9% of those under age 18 and 6.1% of those age 65 or over.

== School districts ==
- DeLand-Weldon Community Unit School District 57
- Monticello Community Unit School District 25

== Political districts ==
- Illinois's 15th congressional district
- State House District 87
- State Senate District 44
