= Flanagan High School =

Flanagan High School may mean:

- Charles W. Flanagan High School, a school in Pembroke Pines, Broward County, Florida
- Flanagan-Cornell High School, the high school of Flanagan-Cornell Unit 74 in Flanagan, Livingston County, Illinois, and named Flanagan High School before 2008
