= Fisher Community Unit School District 1 =

School district in Champaign County, Illinois, United States

Address
- 801 South 5th Street Fisher, Illinois, 61843; United States

District information
- Type: Public
- Grades: K–12
- NCES District ID: 1715180

Students and staff
- Students: 584 (2020–2021)

Other information
- Website: www.fisherk12.org

Fisher Community Unit School District 1 is a unified school district located in the village of Fisher, Champaign County, Illinois. Fisher Community Unit School District 1, a district of just under 700 students, is composed of two schools: one consolidated elementary and middle school, and one consolidated junior and senior high school.

It includes Fisher and Dewey.

== History ==
The district's first school were constructed in 1885 on the present site of the high school at a cost of $5000.00 USD, and it was known as Fisher Grade and High School until the construction of the present grade school in 1914 separated the grades and created a greater sense of efficiency in the district. The creation of Fisher Grade and High School in 1885 obsoleted the twenty-three one room schoolhouses that dominated the region of Champaign County at the time.

== School structure ==
The first branch of education that can be taken in District 1 will be taken in Fisher Grade School, a school that serves first through sixth graders alongside kindergartners. Education is continued and completed at Fisher Junior/Senior High School, which builds on the education of those attending on grades seventh through twelfth.

== Extracurricular activities ==
The junior senior high school sports a quizbowl team, and student volunteers perform a play yearly before their classmates. It also sports a student council, a yearbook committee known as "Echo," and a mathematics club, among others.
