= De Land =

De Land may refer to:

== Places ==
- De Land, a village in Illinois
- DeLand, a city in Florida
