= Georgetown–Ridge Farm Community Unit District 4 =

School district in Vermilion County, Illinois, United States

Address
- 502 West Mulberry Street Georgetown, Illinois, 61846; United States
- Coordinates: 39°58′22.5″N 87°38′26.3″W

District information
- Type: Public
- Grades: PreK–12
- NCES District ID: 1700092

Students and staff
- Students: 845

Other information
- Website: www.grf.k12.il.us

Georgetown–Ridge Farm Community Unit District 4, also known as GRF Unit #4, is a school district in Vermilion County, Illinois. It serves the communities of Georgetown and Ridge Farm. The Georgetown–Ridge Farm Community Unit District 4 is in the Vermilion Valley Conference

== Schools ==
- Georgetown–Ridge Farm High School
- Mary Miller Junior High School
- Pine Crest Elementary School
