= Blue Ridge High School (Illinois) =

Public high school in Farmer City, Illinois

Location
- 411 North John Street; Farmer City, DeWitt County, Illinois 61842; United States; 40.247793°N 88.646797°W

Information
- School type: Public, High school
- Established: 1985
- School district: Blue Ridge Community Unit School District 18
- NCES District ID: 1700003
- Superintendent: Hilary Stanifer
- NCES School ID: 170000305119
- Principal: Brian Easter
- Teaching staff: 19.38 (on an FTE basis)
- Grades: 9–12
- Enrollment: 188 (2023–24)
- Student to teacher ratio: 9.70
- Campus type: Rural
- Colors: Royal blue and silver
- Athletics conference: Lincoln Prairie Conference
- Mascot: Knight
- Team name: Knights, Lady Knights
- Yearbook: Knight Tracks
- Website: www.blueridge18.org/page/blue-ridge-high-school

Blue Ridge High School is a public high school in Farmer City, Illinois, United States. It is the only high school in Blue Ridge Community Unit School District 18, which serves Farmer City, Mansfield, and Bellflower and the surrounding rural area where DeWitt, Piatt, McLean, and Champaign counties meet. The school opened in 1985 following the consolidation of the Farmer City-Mansfield and Bellflower school districts. Its teams, the Knights, compete in the Lincoln Prairie Conference of the Illinois High School Association (IHSA). Brian Easter is the principal.

== History ==
Farmer City and Mansfield each maintained their own high schools until 1971, when the two districts consolidated as the Farmer City-Mansfield School District. Each town kept its elementary school, the junior high was placed in Mansfield, and Farmer City-Mansfield High School, whose teams were the Blue Devils, occupied the Farmer City building. Bellflower, to the north in McLean County, operated Bellflower Township High School, which had occupied a brick building at West Melvin and North Prairie streets since 1905.

In May 1984 a "Committee of Ten," made up of past and present board members from the Bellflower and Farmer City-Mansfield districts, proposed merging the districts. The merger passed in a November 6, 1984, referendum by a vote of about 1,013 to 754; it carried by a wide margin in Farmer City but was defeated in Mansfield and Bellflower. The new district was named Blue Ridge in February 1985 after students and community groups helped choose the name, and the merged district began operating that year. The Bellflower high school building was later demolished, and a memorial marks its site.

== Academics ==
In its 2026–27 rankings, U.S. News & World Report ranked Blue Ridge 407th among Illinois high schools and reported an 88 percent graduation rate.

== Athletics ==
The Knights compete in the Lincoln Prairie Conference. The school was previously a member of the Sangamon Valley Conference and the Heart of Illinois Conference. The school fields teams in the following IHSA sports:

- Baseball (boys)
- Basketball (boys, girls)
- Cheerleading (sideline)
- Football (boys)
- Golf (boys, girls)
- Soccer (boys)
- Softball (girls)
- Track and field (boys, girls)
- Volleyball (girls)

Blue Ridge also hosts cooperative programs with DeLand-Weldon High School in football, baseball, softball, golf, soccer, and bass fishing.

== Student activities ==
The school offers the following activities:

- Band, orchestra, and chorus
- Bass fishing
- Marching band
- Scholastic Bowl
- Student Council
- Yearbook (Knight Tracks)
