= Eureka High School (Illinois) =

Location
- 200 West Cruger Avenue; Eureka, Illinois 61530; United States
- 40°43′08″N 89°16′28″W

Information
- Type: Public secondary school
- School district: Eureka Community Unit District 140
- Principal: Kirk Edwards
- Teaching staff: 30.58 (FTE)
- Grades: 9–12
- Enrollment: 481 (2023–2024)
- Student to teacher ratio: 15.73
- Color
- Athletics conference: Heart of Illinois Conference
- Mascot: Hornet
- Website: www.district140.org/o/ehs

Eureka High School (commonly called Eureka High or EHS) is a public secondary school in Eureka, Illinois, United States. The school is part of Eureka Community Unit District 140, with admission based primarily on the locations of students' homes. Communities supported include Eureka, Goodfield, Secor, and Congerville. Serving students in grades ninth grade–twelfth grade, it is a small high school with a student base of 504 students. The school is a member of the Heart of Illinois Conference and competes under the name Hornets.

== Awards and distinctions ==
21 Illinois State Scholars

2014 ACT Red Quill Award for Excellence

2014 Nationally Ranked High School by US News

IHSA State Trophies in

- Scholastic Bowl, Boys & Girls Cross Country, Volleyball, Girls Track, Baseball, Boys & Girls Track, Basketball

== Notable alumni ==
- Dan McCoy (born 1978), comedian and television writer, is a 1996 graduate of Eureka High School
- Andy Studebaker (born 1985; class of 2004) — NFL linebacker for the Indianapolis Colts, is a 2004 graduate of Eureka High School
- Ben Zobrist (born 1981; class of 2001) — All-Star Major League Baseball infielder for the Chicago Cubs, was raised near Eureka

== Notable faculty ==
- Kenny Robertson, mixed martial artist and shop teacher
