= Deer Creek, Illinois =

Deer Creek
- Village
- Location of Deer Creek in Woodford County, Illinois.
- Coordinates: 40°37′36″N 89°19′54″W
- Country: United States
- State: Illinois
- County: Tazewell

Area
  - Total: 0.54 sq mi (1.41 km^{2})
  - Land: 0.54 sq mi (1.39 km^{2})
  - Water: 0.012 sq mi (0.03 km^{2})
- Elevation: 758 ft (231 m)

Population (2020)
  - Total: 667
  - Density: 1,247.2/sq mi (481.56/km^{2})
- Time zone: UTC-6 (CST)
  - Summer (DST): UTC-5 (CDT)
- ZIP code: 61733
- Area code: 309
- FIPS code: 17-18940
- GNIS feature ID: 2398702
- Website: deercreekillinois.org

Deer Creek is a village in Tazewell and Woodford counties in the U.S. state of Illinois. The population was 667 at the 2020 census. Deer Creek is part of the Peoria, Illinois Metropolitan Statistical Area.

== History ==
Deer Creek was founded in 1830. Deer Creek received its name from the creek that ran through the northwest part of the village and the red deer that roamed the woods and came to the creek for water. In the late 1830s, Abraham Chaffer started the first business in Deer Creek at Chaffer's Corner, which was located in the center of Deer Creek Township. The location of Deer Creek has moved three times since 1830, from Chaffer's Corner to New Castle, from New Castle to Belmont, and from Belmont to the present site of Village of Deer Creek.

== Geography ==
According to the 2010 census, Deer Creek has a total area of 0.569 square miles (1.47 km^{2}), of which 0.56 square miles (1.45 km^{2}) (or 98.42%) is land and 0.009 square miles (0.02 km^{2}) (or 1.58%) is water.

== Demographics ==
Historical population
Census	Pop.	Note	%±
1890	125		—
1900	298		138.4%
1910	332		11.4%
1920	344		3.6%
1930	290		−15.7%
1940	469		61.7%
1950	501		6.8%
1960	583		16.4%
1970	647		11.0%
1980	688		6.3%
1990	630		−8.4%
2000	605		−4.0%
2010	704		16.4%
2020	667		−5.3%
U.S. Decennial Census

As of the census of 2010, there were 704 people, 294 households, and 193 families residing in the village. The population density was 1,924.2 inhabitants per square mile (742.9/km^{2}). There were 243 housing units at an average density of 772.8 per square mile (298.4/km^{2}). The racial makeup of the village was 98.84% White, 0.50% Asian, 0.17% from other races, and 0.50% from two or more races. Hispanic or Latino of any race were 0.17% of the population.

There were 227 households, out of which 37.0% had children under the age of 18 living with them, 62.1% were married couples living together, 7.9% had a female householder with no husband present, and 26.9% were non-families. 21.6% of all households were made up of individuals, and 7.9% had someone living alone who was 65 years of age or older. The average household size was 2.67 and the average family size was 3.13.

In the village, the population was spread out, with 27.8% under the age of 18, 8.4% from 18 to 24, 30.4% from 25 to 44, 21.3% from 45 to 64, and 12.1% who were 65 years of age or older. The median age was 35 years. For every 100 females, there were 105.8 males. For every 100 females age 18 and over, there were 106.1 males.

The median income for a household in the village was $38,542, and the median income for a family was $43,750. Males had a median income of $31,985 versus $25,278 for females. The per capita income for the village was $17,578. About 6.6% of families and 5.5% of the population were below the poverty line, including 8.3% of those under age 18 and 3.9% of those age 65 or over.

== Government ==
The Village of Deer Creek is governed by the Village President and Board of Trustees.

Elected Village Board Members:

- Village President: James Hackney
- Village Clerk: Lori Lewis
- Board of Trustees:
  - Jim Hackney
  - Ross Kraemer
  - Brock Wiegand
  - Cole Wiegand
  - Josh Rossman
  - Jake Smith

== Police ==
The village of deer creek has one active police officer and is currently searching for a new Police chief.

Department Members

- John J Lewis

The village of deer creek has no active patrol or police staff beyond a semi-retired police chief listed above. The village relies solely on Tazewell/Woodford county emergency services to respond to crimes and policing needs.

A contract between Goodfield and Deercreek was terminated in 2024 ending a shared police presence in both towns which helped cover crimes and ensure public safety. Post contract end Deer creek has made litter effort in establishing a new system and instead sites in their public Facebook page, run by town clerk Lori Lewis, that is it too much for a small town to meet the states(ILETSB) requirements to hire more officers. During village board meetings it is also noted that there is simply not enough money to employee anymore officers.

== Schools ==
- Dee-Mack Primary and Junior High school, located in Mackinaw, provides K-3rd grade and 7th-8th grade education for students residing in Deer Creek.
- Dee-Mack Intermediate school, located in Deer Creek, provides 4th-6th grade education for students residing in Deer Creek.
- Dee-Mack High school, located in Mackinaw, provides 9th-12th grade education for students residing in Deer Creek.
  - Both Deer Creek and Mackinaw students alike attend school in Deer Creek-Mackinaw District 701.

== Financials ==
The village reports financials annually in a report posted to their website around April of the following year. Village of Deer Creek — FY2025 Financial Summary Fiscal year: May 1, 2024 – April 30, 2025

Revenue

- Total revenue: $834,395.93
- Property tax: $166,282.15
- Water/sewer service: $174,933.85
- Sales tax: $131,439.32
- Income tax: $115,927.44
- Local use tax: $22,561.98
- Motor fuel tax: $30,135.64
- Utility/SMT tax/gaming: $56,230.84
- Miscellaneous income: $105,785.12

Expenses / Disbursements

- Total revenue: $834,395.93
- Total vendor payments: $657,364.13
- The report separately identifies $211,904.02 in total employee compensation.
- The largest listed vendor payment was Rhino Industries — $197,315.00.
- Other significant payments included GA Rich & Sons ($77,258.56), Blue Cross/Blue Shield ($38,184.32), Axon Enterprise ($30,554.61), and Lewis, Yockey & Brown ($28,244.07)

Fund	Beginning balance	Ending balance	Change
General Fund	$319,552	$270,689	-$48,863
Motor Fuel Tax Fund	$77,408	$45,057	-$32,351
Enterprise Fund	$1,483,833	$1,516,386	+$32,553

== Notable person ==
- Wilson Tucker, theater technician and writer.
