= Blue Ridge Community Unit School District 18 =

School district in DeWitt County, Illinois, United States

Location
- Farmer City, Illinois DeWitt County, Illinois United States

District information
- Type: Public Coed
- Grades: PreK–12
- President: Dale Schneman
- Superintendent: Hillary Stanifer
- Schools: Blue Ridge High School (9–12); Blue Ridge Intermediate Junior High School (4–8); Ruth M. Schneider Elementary School (PreK–3)

Students and staff
- Athletic conference: Lincoln Prairie Conference
- District mascot: Knights
- Colors: Blue; Silver

Other information
- Website: https://www.blueridge18.org/

Blue Ridge Community Unit School District 18 is a school district in DeWitt County in the U.S. state of Illinois, with the district office in Farmer City and schools in Farmer City and Mansfield.

== Schools ==
The district operates the following schools:

- Ruth M. Schneider Elementary School in Farmer City
- Blue Ridge Intermediate and Junior High School in Mansfield, IL
- Blue Ridge High School in Farmer City

== See also ==
- List of school districts in Illinois
