= Tri-Valley High School (Illinois) =

Public high school in Downs, Illinois

Location
- 503 East Washington Street; Downs, McLean County, Illinois 61736; United States; 40.39503°N 88.86690°W

Information
- School type: Public, High school
- Established: 1963
- Locale: Town, Fringe
- School district: Tri-Valley Community Unit School District 3
- NCES District ID: 1713920
- Superintendent: Benjamin Derges
- NCES School ID: 171392001736
- Principal: Frank Arnolts
- Teaching staff: 24.00 (on an FTE basis)
- Grades: 9–12
- Enrollment: 329 (2024–25)
- Student to teacher ratio: 13.7
- Colors: Blue and gold
- Athletics conference: Heart of Illinois Conference
- Mascot: Viking
- Website: www.tri-valley3.org

Tri-Valley High School is a public high school in Downs, Illinois, United States, about eight miles southeast of Bloomington. It is the only high school in Tri-Valley Community Unit School District 3, which serves Downs, Ellsworth, and the surrounding rural townships of eastern McLean County. The school's teams, the Vikings, compete in the Illinois High School Association (IHSA). Frank Arnolts is the principal.

== History ==
Downs and Ellsworth each operated their own high schools for much of the twentieth century. Downs opened a three-year high school in 1895 and moved to a new building in 1920, when it became Downs Community High School; Ellsworth began offering high school classes in 1903 and opened a separate high school building in 1939. The two villages organized a joint school district in 1948 during the statewide wave of consolidations but continued to run separate schools until 1963, when the district merged the two high schools to form Tri-Valley High School, initially housed in the former Ellsworth building. The district takes its name from the three waterways that drain the area: Money Creek, the Sangamon River, and Kickapoo Creek.

The high school relocated to a new building in Downs in 1979, across the street from the old Downs Community High School, which was demolished in 1980 except for its agriculture shop, now the district's administrative office.

== Campus ==
The school is located on East Washington Street in Downs on a shared campus with Tri-Valley Elementary School and Tri-Valley Middle School, with the district office nearby. Both of the district's other schools have been named National Blue Ribbon Schools, the elementary school in 2016 and the middle school in 2019, its second such award.

== Academics ==
Tri-Valley offers Advanced Placement courses and five years of Spanish, including AP Spanish. In its 2026–27 rankings, U.S. News & World Report ranked the school 54th among Illinois high schools and reported a 72 percent Advanced Placement participation rate. The school's four-year graduation rate has ranged from 97 to 99 percent over the past five years, and in 2023–24, 46 percent of eleventh graders met proficiency standards in SAT mathematics and 49 percent in English language arts, compared with state averages of 26 and 31 percent.

== Athletics ==
The Vikings compete in the Heart of Illinois Conference, which the school joined in 2006 after 23 years in the Sangamon Valley Conference. The school fields teams in the following sports:

- Baseball (boys)
- Basketball (boys, girls)
- Cheerleading (coed)
- Cross country (boys, girls)
- Football (boys)
- Golf (boys, girls)
- Softball (girls)
- Track and field (boys, girls)
- Volleyball (girls)
- Wrestling (coed)

=== State championships ===
The football team won the IHSA Class 2A state championship in 2015, completing a 14–0 season with a 41–8 victory over Auburn at Huskie Stadium in DeKalb. The team was state runner-up in Class 1A in 2013 and in Class 2A in 2022, when it lost the title game to Decatur St. Teresa at Memorial Stadium in Champaign. Head coach Josh Roop has led the program since 2007, compiling a 156–49 record through the 2025 season with 17 playoff appearances.

The girls' track and field team won the Class A state championship in 1998 and finished third in 1982 and 2009. The softball team finished third in Class 1A in both 2008 and 2009, and the baseball team finished fourth in Class 1A in 2010.

== Student activities ==
The school offers the following clubs and organizations:

- Drama Club
- Esports
- FFA
- Key Club
- Math Team
- National Honor Society
- Scholastic Bowl
- Spanish Club
- Student Council
- Yearbook

The scholastic bowl team qualified for the IHSA Class 1A state finals in 2019.

=== Performing arts ===
The music department offers marching band, concert band, and choir, and the school placed third in the IHSA Class C music sweepstakes in 2009. The theatre department stages an annual musical; its spring 2025 production was Disney's The Little Mermaid. Music, theatre, speech, and visual art programs are supported by the Tri-Valley Fine Arts Boosters.

== Demographics ==
In the 2024–25 school year, the school enrolled 329 students: 100 in grade 9, 85 in grade 10, 74 in grade 11, and 70 in grade 12. The student body was 92.7 percent White, 4.0 percent Hispanic, 2.1 percent multiracial, and 1.2 percent Asian. About 9 percent of students qualified for free or reduced-price lunch.
