= Mansfield, Illinois =

Mansfield
- Village
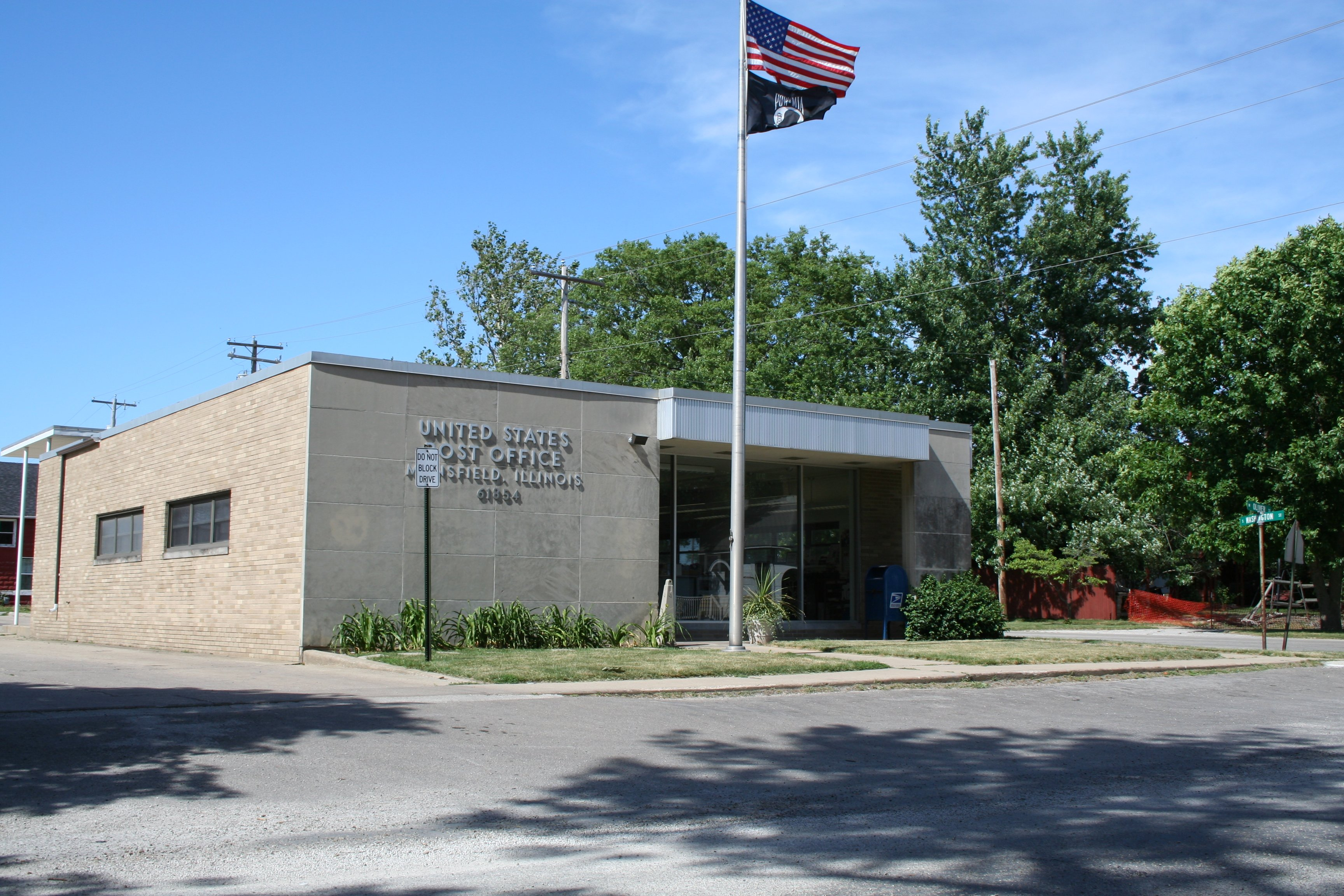
- Mansfield Post Office

- Location of Mansfield in Piatt County, Illinois.
- Coordinates: 40°12′35″N 88°30′12″W
- Country: United States
- State: Illinois
- County: Piatt
- Township: Blue Ridge

Area
  - Total: 0.54 sq mi (1.39 km^{2})
  - Land: 0.51 sq mi (1.31 km^{2})
  - Water: 0.027 sq mi (0.07 km^{2})
- Elevation: 725 ft (221 m)

Population (2020)
  - Total: 928
  - Density: 1,828/sq mi (705.9/km^{2})
- Time zone: UTC-6 (CST)
  - Summer (DST): UTC-5 (CDT)
- ZIP code: 61854
- Area code: 217
- FIPS code: 17-46487
- GNIS ID: 2399244
- Website: villageofmansfield.net

Mansfield is a village in Piatt County, Illinois in the United States. As of the 2020 census, Mansfield had a population of 928.

== History ==
Mansfield was originally incorporated around 1870. The village may have been named for John Mansfield, an officer in the Civil War. Other sources suggest Mansfield was named after a number of other unrelated men named Mansfield, including Jared Mansfield, an early American surveyor, or J.L. Mansfield, a local philanthropist. The village may also have been named after the city of Mansfield, Ohio – which was itself named for the surveyor Jared Mansfield.

== Geography ==
According to the 2010 census, Mansfield has a total area of 0.555 square miles (1.44 km^{2}), of which 0.53 square miles (1.37 km^{2}) (or 95.5%) is land and 0.025 square miles (0.06 km^{2}) (or 4.5%) is water.

=== Climate ===
Climate data for Mansfield, IL (1991-2020 precipitation normals)
Month	Jan	Feb	Mar	Apr	May	Jun	Jul	Aug	Sep	Oct	Nov	Dec	Year
Average precipitation inches	2.10	1.95	2.71	3.85	4.40	4.84	4.40	3.47	3.41	3.24	2.94	2.26	39.57
Average precipitation mm	53	50	69	98	112	123	112	88	87	82	75	57	1,006
Source: NOAA

== Demographics ==
Historical population
Census	Pop.	Note	%±
1880	398		—
1890	533		33.9%
1900	708		32.8%
1910	681		−3.8%
1920	669		−1.8%
1930	681		1.8%
1940	693		1.8%
1950	665		−4.0%
1960	743		11.7%
1970	870		17.1%
1980	921		5.9%
1990	929		0.9%
2000	949		2.2%
2010	906		−4.5%
2020	928		2.4%
U.S. Decennial Census

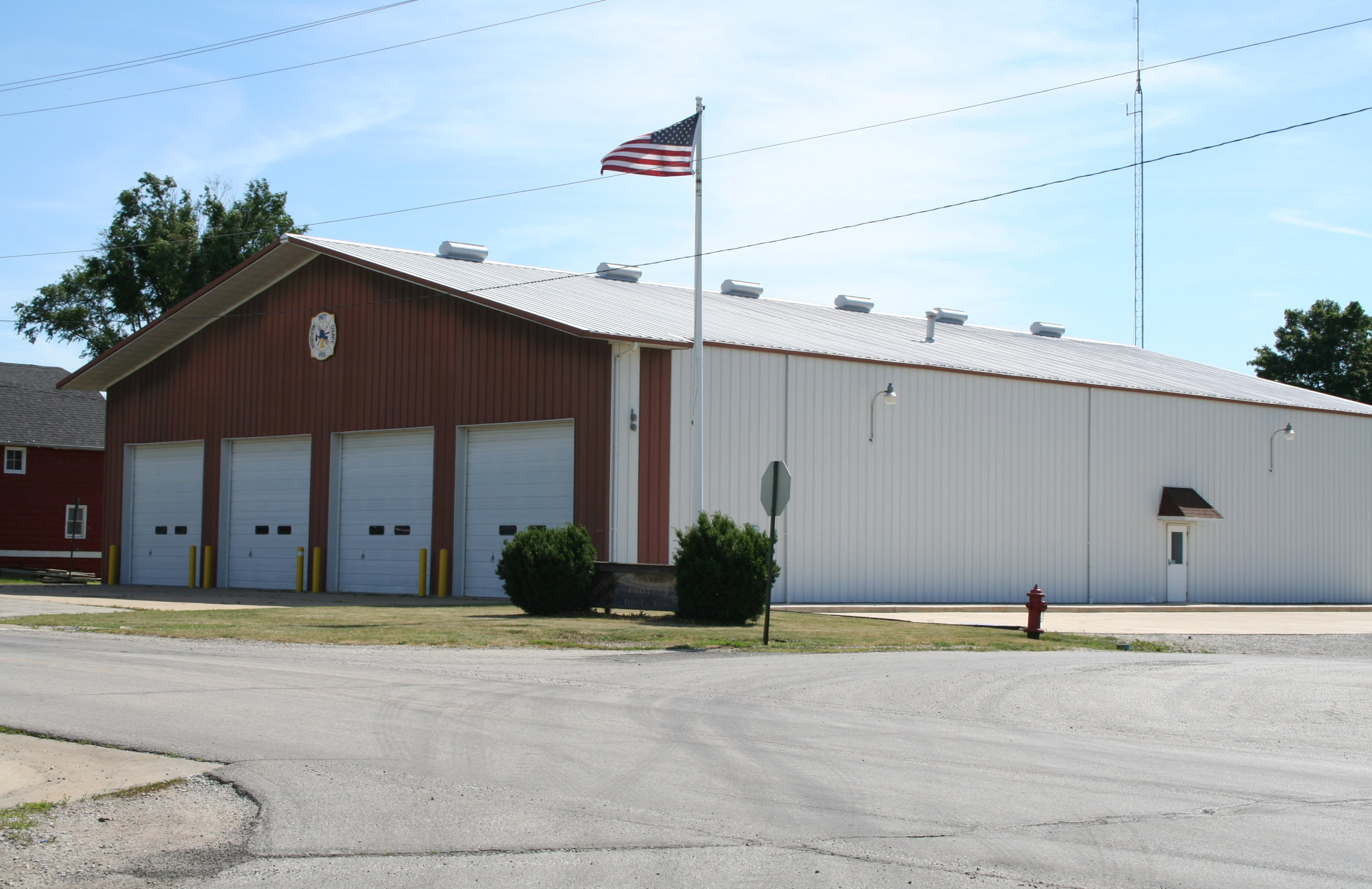
Northern Piatt County Fire Protection District Fire Station in Mansfield

As of the census of 2000, there were 949 people, 396 households, and 293 families residing in the village. The population density was 1,856.3 inhabitants per square mile (716.7/km^{2}). There were 424 housing units at an average density of 829.4 per square mile (320.2/km^{2}). The racial makeup of the village was 98.95% White, 0.53% Asian, and 0.53% from two or more races. Hispanic or Latino of any race were 0.63% of the population.

There were 396 households, out of which 31.3% had children under the age of 18 living with them, 63.4% were married couples living together, 7.3% had a female householder with no husband present, and 25.8% were non-families. 22.5% of all households were made up of individuals, and 9.1% had someone living alone who was 65 years of age or older. The average household size was 2.40 and the average family size was 2.79.

In the village, the population was spread out, with 22.9% under the age of 18, 7.5% from 18 to 24, 29.4% from 25 to 44, 27.4% from 45 to 64, and 12.9% who were 65 years of age or older. The median age was 39 years. For every 100 females, there were 94.1 males. For every 100 females age 18 and over, there were 92.1 males.

The median income for a household in the village was $43,942, and the median income for a family was $48,393. Males had a median income of $32,042 versus $23,047 for females. The per capita income for the village was $20,947. About 1.4% of families and 3.9% of the population were below the poverty line, including 4.6% of those under age 18 and 1.6% of those age 65 or over.

== Education ==
Mansfield is home to Blue Ridge Intermediate Junior High School which is part of Blue Ridge Community Unit School District 18. Elementary and High School age students attend Ruth M. Schneider Elementary School and Blue Ridge High School in nearby Farmer City.
