= DeLand-Weldon High School =

Public high school in De Land, Illinois

Location
- 304 East Illinois Route 10; De Land, Piatt County, Illinois 61839; United States; 40.127°N 88.686°W

Information
- School type: Public, High school
- Opened: 1957
- School district: DeLand-Weldon Community Unit School District 57
- NCES District ID: 1712030
- Superintendent: Michael Tresnak
- NCES School ID: 171203001457
- Principal: Matt Goldman
- Teaching staff: 7.93 (on an FTE basis)
- Grades: 9–12
- Enrollment: 45 (2024–25)
- Student to teacher ratio: 5.67
- Campus type: Rural
- Colors: Maroon and gray
- Athletics conference: East Central Illinois Conference
- Mascot: Eagle
- Website: www.dwschools.org/high-school

DeLand-Weldon High School is a public high school in De Land, Illinois, United States. It is the only high school in DeLand-Weldon Community Unit School District 57, which serves the villages of De Land and Weldon and the surrounding rural area of western Piatt County and eastern DeWitt County. With 45 students in 2024–25, it is among the smallest public high schools in Illinois. Its teams, the Eagles, compete in the East Central Illinois Conference of the Illinois High School Association (IHSA). Matt Goldman is the principal.

== History ==
=== Predecessor schools ===
De Land opened its original high school in 1880. That building was lost to a fire in 1904 and promptly replaced, and the second structure served until 1921, when a larger school was constructed. Weldon operated its own high school beginning in 1925 under the Nixon Township system. Both schools were constrained by the low enrollment and limited resources typical of small rural districts.

Residents of both towns voted to unify their school districts in 1947, creating what became Community Unit District 57. Weldon High School ceased independent operations by 1949, and students from both communities attended classes in the De Land building while the new district planned a permanent shared campus.

=== Current building ===
On December 7, 1957, district voters approved building and equipping a new high school on the county line midway between the two communities. The building was erected at a cost of approximately $550,000 as a four-year high school, with provision for adding four rooms to house the seventh and eighth grades of both communities. The district's elementary and middle schools now share the same campus.

== Academics ==
The school offers a college preparatory curriculum along with career and technical education courses. Its four-year graduation rate ranged from 87.5 to 90.9 percent between 2017–18 and 2022–23, and per-pupil spending exceeded $24,000 in 2022–23.

== Athletics ==
The Eagles compete in the East Central Illinois Conference, whose members are small schools in central Illinois, and in IHSA state tournaments in Class 1A, the smallest enrollment class. The school fields its own teams in the following sports:

- Basketball (boys, girls)
- Cheerleading (sideline)
- Cross country (boys, girls)
- Track and field (boys, girls)
- Volleyball (girls)
- Wrestling (boys, girls)

Because of its small enrollment, the school participates in cooperative programs hosted by Blue Ridge High School in Farmer City for football, baseball, softball, boys' and girls' golf, coed soccer, and bass fishing.

== Student activities ==
The school offers the following activities:

- Concert and marching band
- Chorus
- Scholastic Bowl
- Student Council
- Yearbook

== Demographics ==
In the 2024–25 school year, the school enrolled 45 students. About one-third of students qualified for free or reduced-price lunch.

== Notable alumni ==
- Ray Ahlrich (class of 1941), basketball official inducted into the Illinois Basketball Coaches Association Hall of Fame in 1996
- Joe Huisinga (class of 1946), basketball player inducted into the Illinois Basketball Coaches Association Hall of Fame in 2007
- Larry Huisinga (class of 1969), basketball player and coach who set 19 school records, including 1,762 career points, played at Illinois State University, and coached LeRoy High School for 34 seasons to 628 wins and 15 conference championships; inducted into the Illinois Basketball Coaches Association Hall of Fame in 2012
- Brielle Jones (class of 2008), holder of the IHSA girls' basketball records for most blocked shots in a season (240) and in a game (21)
