= Mackinaw, Illinois =

Mackinaw
- Village
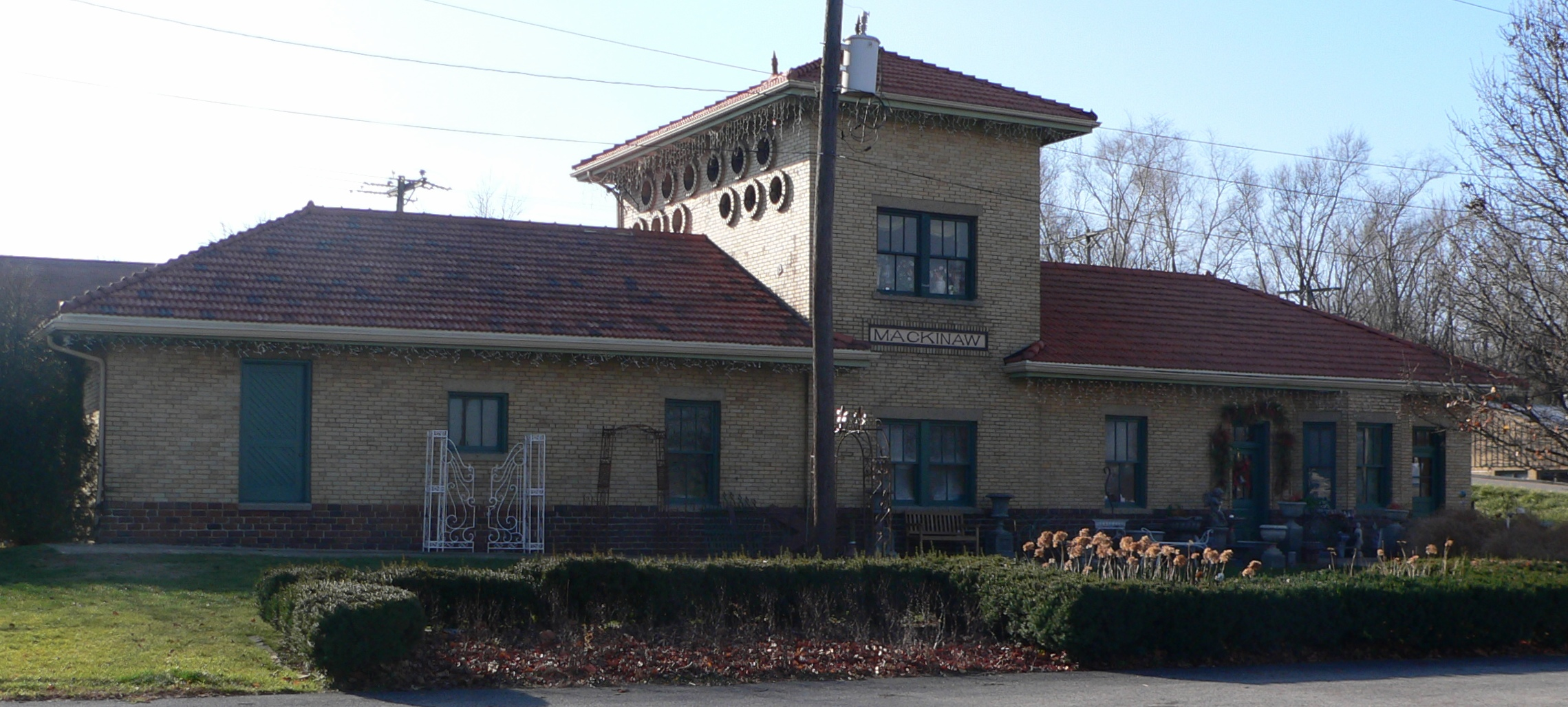
- Former Mackinaw train depot

- Location of Mackinaw in Tazewell County, Illinois.
- Coordinates: 40°31′48″N 89°21′40″W
- Country: United States
- State: Illinois
- County: Tazewell
- Founded: 1827
- Founded by: George W. Minier and Charles E. Boyer

Government
  - Village President: Joe Schmidgall

Area
  - Total: 1.22 sq mi (3.16 km^{2})
  - Land: 1.19 sq mi (3.08 km^{2})
  - Water: 0.031 sq mi (0.08 km^{2})
- Elevation: 656 ft (200 m)

Population (2020)
  - Total: 1,879
  - Estimate (2024): 1,848
  - Density: 1,580.3/sq mi (610.15/km^{2})
- Time zone: UTC-6 (CST)
  - Summer (DST): UTC-5 (CDT)
- ZIP code: 61755
- Area code: 309
- FIPS code: 17-45785
- GNIS feature ID: 2399217
- Website: mackinawil.gov

Mackinaw is a village in Tazewell County, Illinois, United States, and is part of the Peoria, Illinois Metropolitan Statistical Area. As of the 2020 census, Mackinaw had a population of 1,879.

== History ==
The village lies within, but is politically independent of, Mackinaw Township. Both take their name from the nearby Mackinaw River. Mackinaw (sometimes spelled Mackinac) is derived from the Ojibwe word mikinaak meaning "turtle".

Mackinaw was founded in 1827 by George Washington Minier, namesake of Minier, Illinois, and Charles E. Boyer. It was the first county seat of Tazewell County from 1827 to 1831, when it moved to Pekin. The courthouse was built for $125 by Amasa Stout.

Following the 1933 end to prohibition, Mackinaw remained a "dry" community through 2013, when residents voted to allow the sale of alcohol.

== Geography ==
According to the 2010 census, Mackinaw has a total area of 1.38 square miles (3.57 km^{2}), of which 1.35 square miles (3.50 km^{2}) (or 97.83%) is land and 0.03 square miles (0.08 km^{2}) (or 2.17%) is water.

== Demographics ==
Historical population
Census	Pop.	Note	%±
1870	496		—
1880	482		−2.8%
1890	545		13.1%
1900	859		57.6%
1910	725		−15.6%
1920	828		14.2%
1930	760		−8.2%
1940	845		11.2%
1950	1,011		19.6%
1960	1,163		15.0%
1970	1,293		11.2%
1980	1,354		4.7%
1990	1,331		−1.7%
2000	1,452		9.1%
2010	1,950		34.3%
2020	1,879		−3.6%
U.S. Decennial Census

=== 2020 census ===
As of the 2020 census, Mackinaw had a population of 1,879. The median age was 37.4 years. 27.9% of residents were under the age of 18 and 15.6% of residents were 65 years of age or older. For every 100 females there were 102.0 males, and for every 100 females age 18 and over there were 94.4 males age 18 and over.

0.0% of residents lived in urban areas, while 100.0% lived in rural areas.

There were 741 households in Mackinaw, of which 37.2% had children under the age of 18 living in them. Of all households, 49.3% were married-couple households, 19.0% were households with a male householder and no spouse or partner present, and 23.6% were households with a female householder and no spouse or partner present. About 29.0% of all households were made up of individuals and 12.1% had someone living alone who was 65 years of age or older.

There were 801 housing units, of which 7.5% were vacant. The homeowner vacancy rate was 4.4% and the rental vacancy rate was 9.9%.

Racial composition as of the 2020 census
Race	Number	Percent
White	1,742	92.7%
Black or African American	13	0.7%
American Indian and Alaska Native	4	0.2%
Asian	7	0.4%
Native Hawaiian and Other Pacific Islander	0	0.0%
Some other race	14	0.7%
Two or more races	99	5.3%
Hispanic or Latino (of any race)	40	2.1%

=== 2010 census ===
As of the census of 2010, there were 1,950 people, 746 households, and 540 families residing in the village. The population density was 1,416.4 people per square mile and there were 799 housing units. The racial makeup of the village was 97.69% White, 0.72% African American, 0.15% Native American, 0.36% Asian, 0% Pacific Islander, 0.21% from other races, and 0.87% from two or more races. Hispanic or Latino of any race was 1.69% of the population.

There were 579 households, out of which 35.8% had children under the age of 18 living with them, 56.0% were married couples living together, 10.3% had a female householder with no husband present, and 27.6% were non-families. 22.7% of all households were made up of individuals living alone, and 10.7% had someone living alone who was 65 years of age or older. The average household size was 2.61 and the average family size was 3.08.

In the village, the population was spread out, with 31.1% under the age of 19, 33.4% from 20 to 44, 28.4% from 25 to 44, 21.8% from 45 to 64, and 13.5% who were 65 years of age or older. The median age was 35.4 years. For every 100 females, there were 97.6 males. For every 100 females age 18 and over, there were 95.1 males.

=== Income and poverty ===
The median income for a household in the village was $61,083 and the median income for a family was $71,027. Males had a median income of $40,147 versus $21,429 for females. The per capita income for the village was $23,853. About 1% of families and 1.53% of the population were below the poverty line.

== Schools ==
The school district is Deer Creek-Mackinaw Community Unit School District 701.

Their high school is Deer Creek-Mackinaw High School and it is located on 401 E. Fifth St, Mackinaw, IL. Both students from Mackinaw and Deer Creek, Illinois attend Deemack High School. Dee-Mack athletics participate in the Heart of Illinois Conference and in 2012 their girls' volleyball team won the class 2A state title. This was Dee-Mack's first state championship. On November 25, 2016, Dee-Mack's football team played in their first football state championship game in 29 years. They played Maroa-Forsyth for the class 2A Illinois State Championship in Champaign, Illinois at the University of Illinois' Gies Memorial Stadium. They won the game 35–7, which was the first state championship in football for the school. They finished their season with a 13–1 record.
