= Georgetown, Illinois =

- City
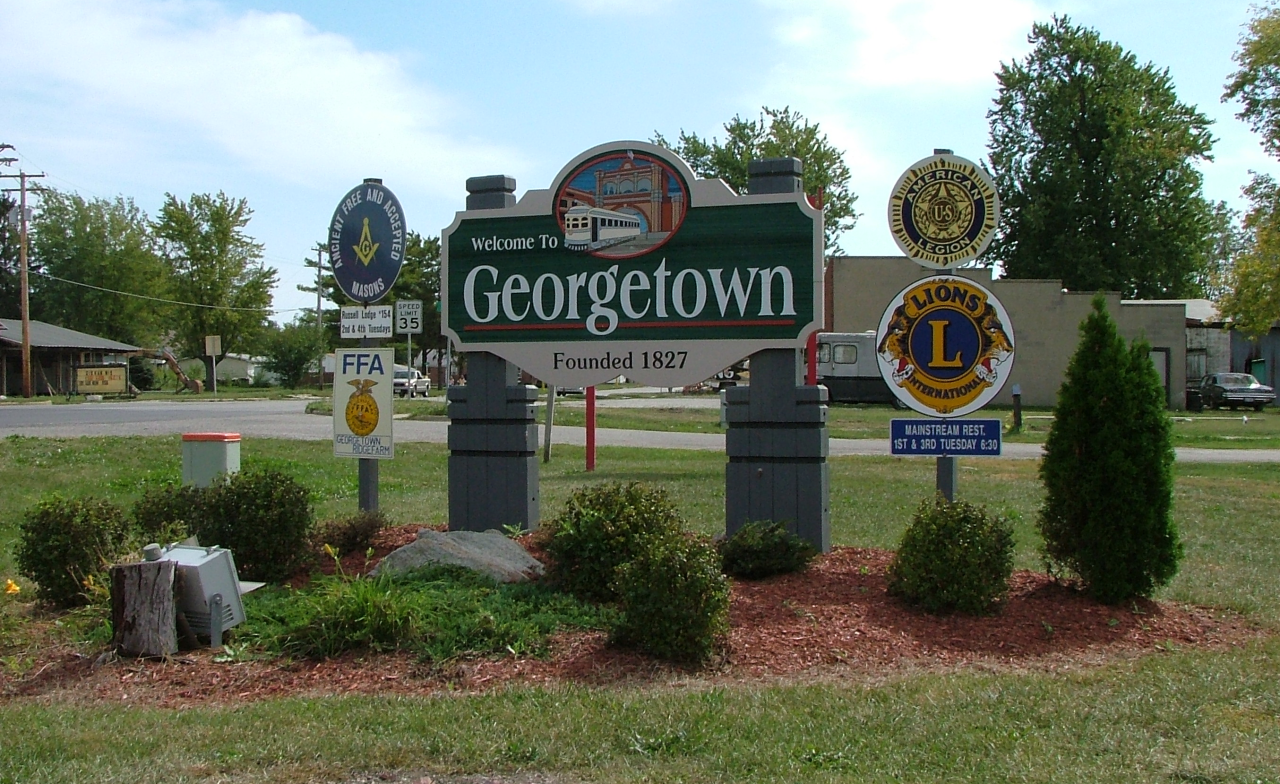
- Signs at the north edge of Georgetown

- Flag

- Location of Georgetown in Vermilion County, Illinois.

- Georgetown's location in Vermilion County
- Coordinates: 39°58′39″N 87°38′07″W
- Country: United States
- State: Illinois
- County: Vermilion County
- Township: Georgetown Township
- Founded: 1826

Area
  - Total: 1.62 sq mi (4.19 km^{2})
  - Land: 1.62 sq mi (4.19 km^{2})
  - Water: 0 sq mi (0.00 km^{2})
- Elevation: 653 ft (199 m)

Population (2020)
  - Total: 3,143
  - Density: 1,945.0/sq mi (750.98/km^{2})
- Time zone: UTC-6 (CST)
  - Summer (DST): UTC-5 (CDT)
- ZIP code: 61846
- Area code(s): 217, 447
- FIPS code: 17-28963
- GNIS ID: 2394882
- Website: https://georgetownil.net/

Georgetown is a city in Vermilion County, Illinois, United States. As of the 2020 census, the city population was 3,143. It is part of the Danville, Illinois Metropolitan Statistical Area.

== History ==
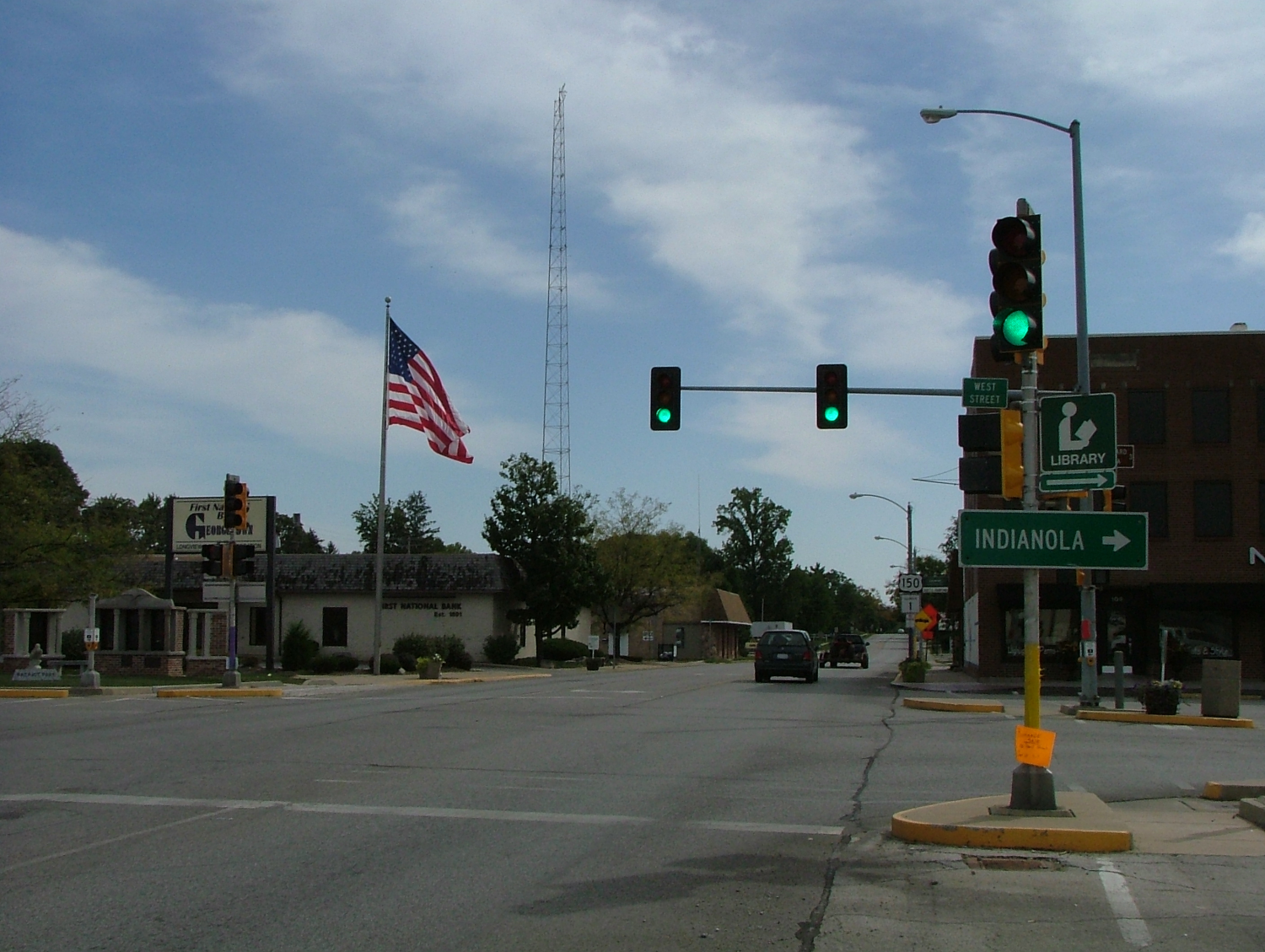
Downtown Georgetown, 2007

Georgetown was established in 1826 and was platted by James Haworth with the length of a grapevine, although the first home was established in 1820 by Henry Johnson. The town may have been named after George Beckwith, since Danville had been named after Dan Beckwith; another possibility is that it was named after James Haworth's son George. The first post office was established in 1828.

The Paris and Danville Railroad was built in 1871, and the "Interurban" started carrying passengers between Georgetown and Danville sometime after 1900.

== Geography ==
Georgetown is located on Illinois Route 1 / U.S. Route 150 about 13 miles (21 km) south of the county seat of Danville. According to the 2010 census, Georgetown has a total area of 0.14 square miles (0.36 km^{2}), all land.

At the southern part of the town, the Little Vermillion river runs through Georgetown, going over a dam at the southern end of the town's borders.

== Demographics ==
Historical population
Census	Pop.	Note	%±
1880	741		—
1890	662		−10.7%
1900	988		49.2%
1910	2,307		133.5%
1920	3,061		32.7%
1930	3,407		11.3%
1940	3,235		−5.0%
1950	3,294		1.8%
1960	3,544		7.6%
1970	3,984		12.4%
1980	4,220		5.9%
1990	3,678		−12.8%
2000	3,628		−1.4%
2010	3,474		−4.2%
2020	3,143		−9.5%
U.S. Decennial Census

=== 2020 census ===
As of the 2020 census, Georgetown had a population of 3,143. The median age was 38.9 years. 24.8% of residents were under the age of 18 and 17.7% of residents were 65 years of age or older. For every 100 females there were 95.9 males, and for every 100 females age 18 and over there were 92.8 males age 18 and over.

0.0% of residents lived in urban areas, while 100.0% lived in rural areas.

There were 1,323 households in Georgetown, of which 29.9% had children under the age of 18 living in them. Of all households, 39.5% were married-couple households, 20.3% were households with a male householder and no spouse or partner present, and 31.2% were households with a female householder and no spouse or partner present. About 31.6% of all households were made up of individuals and 13.5% had someone living alone who was 65 years of age or older.

There were 1,486 housing units, of which 11.0% were vacant. The homeowner vacancy rate was 2.4% and the rental vacancy rate was 9.0%.

Racial composition as of the 2020 census
Race	Number	Percent
White	2,864	91.1%
Black or African American	90	2.9%
American Indian and Alaska Native	10	0.3%
Asian	4	0.1%
Native Hawaiian and Other Pacific Islander	0	0.0%
Some other race	16	0.5%
Two or more races	159	5.1%
Hispanic or Latino (of any race)	60	1.9%

=== 2000 census ===
As of the census of 2000, there were 3,628 people, 1,470 households, and 1,004 families residing in the city. The population density was 2,250.6 inhabitants per square mile (869.0/km^{2}). There were 1,564 housing units at an average density of 970.2 per square mile (374.6/km^{2}). The racial makeup of the city was 95.53% White, 2.73% African American, 0.28% Native American, 0.06% Asian, 0.25% from other races, and 1.16% from two or more races. Hispanic or Latino of any race were 1.19% of the population.

There were 1,470 households, out of which 34.4% had children under the age of 18 living with them, 49.9% were married couples living together, 14.2% had a female householder with no husband present, and 31.7% were non-families. 28.6% of all households were made up of individuals, and 16.2% had someone living alone who was 65 years of age or older. The average household size was 2.47 and the average family size was 3.00.

In the city, the population was spread out, with 27.9% under the age of 18, 8.2% from 18 to 24, 26.7% from 25 to 44, 21.1% from 45 to 64, and 16.0% who were 65 years of age or older. The median age was 36 years. For every 100 females, there were 90.1 males. For every 100 females age 18 and over, there were 83.1 males.

The median income for a household in the city was $33,852, and the median income for a family was $37,310. Males had a median income of $32,974 versus $22,581 for females. The per capita income for the city was $14,275. About 8.8% of families and 13.9% of the population were below the poverty line, including 21.6% of those under age 18 and 7.2% of those age 65 or over.

== Education ==
Georgetown is within the Georgetown–Ridge Farm Community Unit District 4.

Educational institutions include:

- Georgetown Ridge Farm High School, High School located in Georgetown.
- Mary Miller Junior High, located in Georgetown.
- Pine Crest Elementary, located in Georgetown.
- Notre Dame De La Salette Boys Academy, traditionalist Catholic boarding school administered by the Society of Saint Pius X.

== Transportation ==
Danville Mass Transit provides bus service on Route 9 connecting Georgetown to downtown Danville and other destinations.
