= DeLand-Weldon Community Unit School District 57 =

School district in Piatt County, Illinois, USA

Address
- 304 E. Illinois Route 10 De Land, Illinois, 61839; United States

District information
- Type: Public
- President: Jamie Dunn
- Vice-president: Paige Trimble
- Superintendent: Amanda Geary
- Schools: 3

Students and staff
- Enrollment: 215
- Teachers: 23
- Student–teacher ratio: 12:1
- District mascot: Eagle
- Colors: Maroon and Grey

Other information
- Website: www.dwschools.org

DeLand-Weldon Community Unit School District 57 is based in Piatt County, Illinois and serves the towns of De Land and Weldon. There are three schools in the district, DeLand-Weldon Elementary, DeLand-Weldon Middle School, and DeLand-Weldon High School, all located at the same location.

== Statistics ==
Students Total Students - 219

Teachers Total Teachers - 25

== History ==
Weldon had its first school in Nixon Township in 1856, and the first school in the village was open in 1876. High School courses were started in the late 1800s as a three-year course, with the fourth year available in a neighboring town. A fourth year was added in 1916, and the first graduates received their diplomas in 1918. In 1925, a new building was built and joined the kids within Nixon Township to continue their education.

Weldon Nixon Township High School served Weldon from the late 1800s until the late 1940s. It was then that the townspeople of Weldon and nearby De Land began consolidation talks of their school districts. The two schools agreed to combine their efforts in 1947, though it is believed the actual merger did not take effect until 1949. The creation of this district DeLand-Weldon High School effectively ended the run of high school efforts in Weldon.

De Land traces its educational roots back to the late 1880s. A high school building existed in town as early as 1880. That building served the students until it burned down in 1904. A newer building was built which lasted until 1921. As De Land grew it needed more space for its students. The 1904 building continued as De Land Grade School until 1959.

A newer high school building was built in 1921. This building served proudly as De Land High School until consolidation efforts between the residents of De Land and Weldon, as well as several country schools, began in the mid 1940s. Votes in both towns made the consolidation effort a reality in 1947. The DeLand-Weldon School District was formed, effectively closing De Land's run as a solo high school. It is possible though, that the two high schools did not actually merge until 1949 as is evidenced by the District Championship recognized by the IHSA for De Land High School in 1948.

The De Land High School building served as DeLand-Weldon High School until a new building was built in 1957. DeLand-Weldon High School still serves both communities today and is going strong, in spite of having one of the smallest high school enrollments in the state. A great deal of information for this history section was found on the DeLand-Weldon C.U.S.D. #57 website at On December 7, 1957, the citizens of Unit #57 voted to build and equip a new high school on the county line midway between the two communities. The new building was erected at a cost of approximately $550,000, and provides for a four-year school, with provisions in the future to add four rooms to accommodate the seventh and eighth grades of both communities. Therefore, during the ten-year interim, the schools of DeLand-Weldon Unit #57 moved toward the original long range goal set in 1948.
