= De Land, Illinois =

De Land
- Village
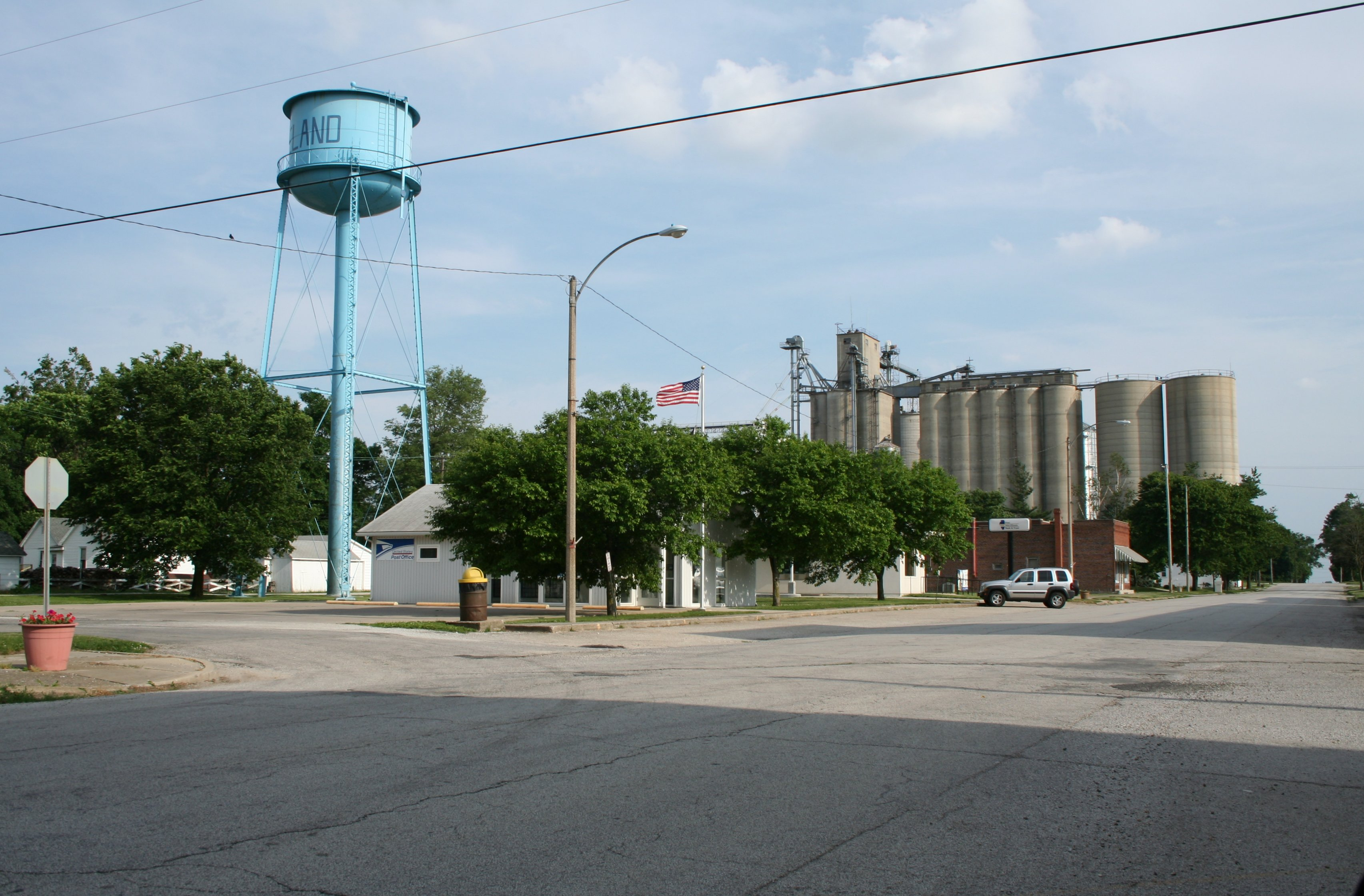
- Water tower, Post Office, Goose Creek Library and grain elevators in downtown De Land, 2007

- Location of De Land in Piatt County, Illinois.
- Coordinates: 40°07′25″N 88°38′39″W
- Country: United States
- State: Illinois
- County: Piatt
- Township: Goose Creek
- Founded: 1873
- Incorporated: 1899
- Named for: James DeLand or French DeLand (disputed)

Area
  - Total: 0.42 sq mi (1.10 km^{2})
  - Land: 0.42 sq mi (1.10 km^{2})
  - Water: 0 sq mi (0.00 km^{2})
- Elevation: 705 ft (215 m)

Population (2020)
  - Total: 447
  - Density: 1,053.2/sq mi (406.65/km^{2})
- Time zone: UTC-6 (CST)
  - Summer (DST): UTC-5 (CDT)
- ZIP code: 61839
- Area code: 217
- FIPS code: 17-19200
- GNIS ID: 2398693

De Land is a village in Piatt County, Illinois, United States. As of the 2020 census, De Land had a population of 447. The name is also written DeLand, as in the name of the local school district.

== History ==
De Land was founded in 1873 by Thomas E. Bondurant, a Kentucky native who bought the land from its original owner, Ezra Marquis, and had it laid out as an answer to the needs of the local farmers for a place from which to ship their grain. Before officially being named De Land, the town was known as "Tom's Town" in honor of Thomas Bondurant. The origin of the name De Land is disputed, with most accounts tracing it to either James DeLand, who helped bring the railroad to the area in 1872, or French DeLand, a surveyor who is said to have laid out the town. The village was incorporated in 1899. It has long styled itself "the biggest little town on earth," and celebrated its sesquicentennial in 2023.

In 1912 a Carnegie library was opened in De Land with $8,000 provided by the Carnegie Corporation of New York, after a group of citizens including Tom McMillen, a local bank employee, and Lucy Thornton, the president of the Women's Club, raised public support for the project. The building, which features a stained-glass ceiling over its rotunda, served as the library for nearly a century but could not be brought into compliance with the Americans with Disabilities Act. When First Mid-Illinois Bank closed its De Land branch in 2007, it donated the bank building to the library district, and the library, now the Goose Creek District Library, moved there in December 2009. The former Carnegie building still stands and is privately owned.

In 2002, the De Land board of trustees acknowledged that it had passed a sundown town ordinance decades earlier.

== Geography ==
According to the 2020 census gazetteer files, De Land has a total area of 0.42 square miles (1.09 km^{2}), all land.

== Demographics ==
Historical population
Census	Pop.	Note	%±
1900	411		—
1910	503		22.4%
1920	542		7.8%
1930	474		−12.5%
1940	487		2.7%
1950	416		−14.6%
1960	422		1.4%
1970	418		−0.9%
1980	509		21.8%
1990	458		−10.0%
2000	475		3.7%
2010	446		−6.1%
2020	447		0.2%
U.S. Decennial Census

As of the 2020 census, De Land had a population of 447. According to the 2020–2024 American Community Survey, the village had 186 households and 204 housing units, with an average of 2.4 persons per household. The median age was 46.2 years. The median household income was $50,000 and the per capita income was $29,192; about 13 percent of residents were below the poverty line. The median value of an owner-occupied home was $87,000.

As of the 2010 census, there were 446 people, 185 households, and 132 families residing in the village. There were 207 housing units of which 185 were occupied. The racial makeup of the village was 98.4% White, 1.1% Hispanic, 0.9% 2+ races, 0.4% Asian, and 0.2% Black.

There were 185 households, out of which 27.6% had children under the age of 18 living with them, 55.1% were married couples living together, 8.6% had a female householder with no husband present, 7.6% had a male householder with no wife present, and 28.6% were non-families. 30.8% of all households had individuals under 18 years of age and 29.2% had individuals who were 65 years of age or older. The average household size was 2.41 and the average family size was 2.84.

In the village, the population was spread out, with 24.4% under the age of 20, 4.3% from 20 to 24, 26.7% from 25 to 44, 27.8% from 45 to 64, and 16.8% who were 65 years of age or older. The median age was 40.5 years. The median age for males was 39.8, and 41.7 for females.

The median income for a household in the village was $40,982, and the median income for a family was $45,156. Males had a median income of $31,429 versus $20,893 for females. The per capita income for the village was $17,377. About 4.9% of families and 4.6% of the population were below the poverty line, including 2.8% of those under age 18 and 9.5% of those age 65 or over.

== Education ==
The village is served by DeLand-Weldon Community Unit School District 57, which operates an elementary school, a middle school, and DeLand-Weldon High School on a single campus on Illinois Route 10 between De Land and Weldon. With 45 students in 2024–25, the high school is among the smallest public high schools in Illinois.

== Culture ==
The village holds an annual DeLand Homecoming festival over Labor Day weekend, first held in 1957. The event includes meals served by local organizations, a Saturday morning parade, and entertainment; the Illinois House of Representatives passed a resolution recognizing its fiftieth year in 2006.

== See also ==
- List of sundown towns in the United States
