= Fisher, Illinois =

Fisher
- Village
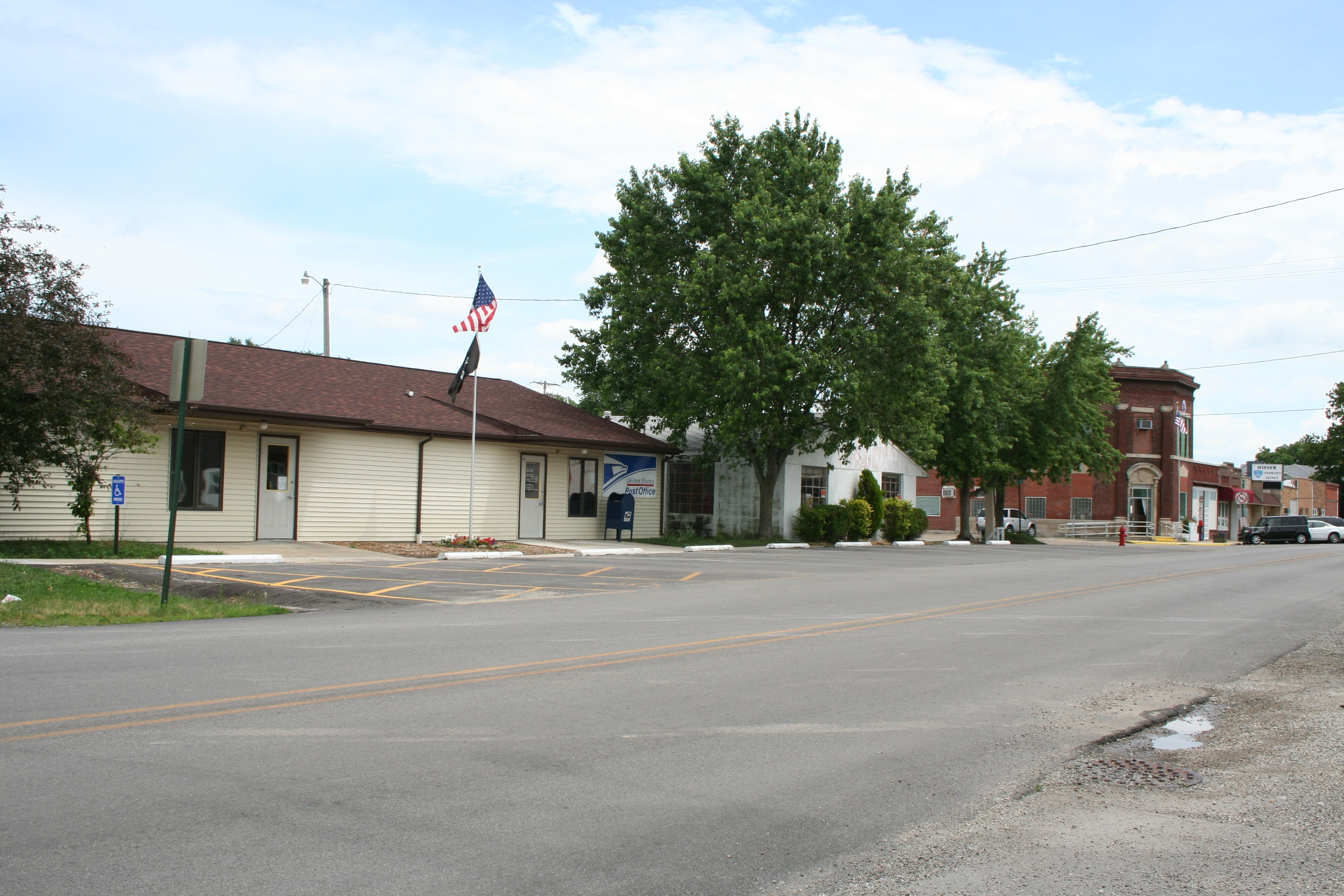
- Downtown Fisher

- Location of Fisher in Champaign County, Illinois.
- Coordinates: 40°18′56″N 88°21′01″W
- Country: United States
- State: Illinois
- County: Champaign

Area
  - Total: 1.33 sq mi (3.44 km^{2})
  - Land: 1.33 sq mi (3.44 km^{2})
  - Water: 0 sq mi (0.00 km^{2})
- Elevation: 712 ft (217 m)

Population (2020)
  - Total: 2,062
  - Density: 1,550.3/sq mi (598.56/km^{2})
- Time zone: UTC-6 (CST)
  - Summer (DST): UTC-5 (CDT)
- ZIP code: 61843
- Area code: 217
- FIPS code: 17-26194
- GNIS feature ID: 2398880
- Website: www.fisher.il.us

Fisher is a village in Champaign County, Illinois, United States, that was founded in 1875. As of the 2020 census, Fisher had a population of 2,062.

== Geography ==
According to the 2021 census gazetteer files, Fisher has a total area of 1.33 square miles (3.44 km^{2}), all land.

== Demographics ==
Historical population
Census	Pop.	Note	%±
1880	188		—
1900	614		—
1910	850		38.4%
1920	747		−12.1%
1930	709		−5.1%
1940	754		6.3%
1950	894		18.6%
1960	1,155		29.2%
1970	1,525		32.0%
1980	1,572		3.1%
1990	1,526		−2.9%
2000	1,647		7.9%
2010	1,881		14.2%
2020	2,062		9.6%
U.S. Decennial Census

=== 2020 census ===
As of the 2020 census, Fisher had a population of 2,062, with 804 households and 529 families residing in the village.

The population density was 1,550.38 inhabitants per square mile (598.61/km^{2}). There were 850 housing units at an average density of 639.10 per square mile (246.76/km^{2}).

The median age was 36.4 years. 26.9% of residents were under the age of 18 and 15.7% of residents were 65 years of age or older. For every 100 females there were 97.3 males, and for every 100 females age 18 and over there were 95.8 males age 18 and over.

0.0% of residents lived in urban areas, while 100.0% lived in rural areas.

Of the 804 households, 36.9% had children under the age of 18 living in them. Of all households, 53.6% were married-couple households, 16.3% were households with a male householder and no spouse or partner present, and 23.1% were households with a female householder and no spouse or partner present. About 23.9% of all households were made up of individuals, and 10.5% had someone living alone who was 65 years of age or older.

Of the 850 housing units, 5.4% were vacant. The homeowner vacancy rate was 1.2% and the rental vacancy rate was 7.3%.

Racial composition as of the 2020 census
Race	Number	Percent
White	1,944	94.3%
Black or African American	9	0.4%
American Indian and Alaska Native	1	0.0%
Asian	9	0.4%
Native Hawaiian and Other Pacific Islander	0	0.0%
Some other race	13	0.6%
Two or more races	86	4.2%
Hispanic or Latino (of any race)	31	1.5%

=== Income and poverty ===
The median income for a household in the village was $71,136, and the median income for a family was $88,177. Males had a median income of $46,744 versus $37,717 for females. The per capita income for the village was $33,378. About 2.8% of families and 3.6% of the population were below the poverty line, including 6.5% of those under age 18 and 5.7% of those age 65 or over.

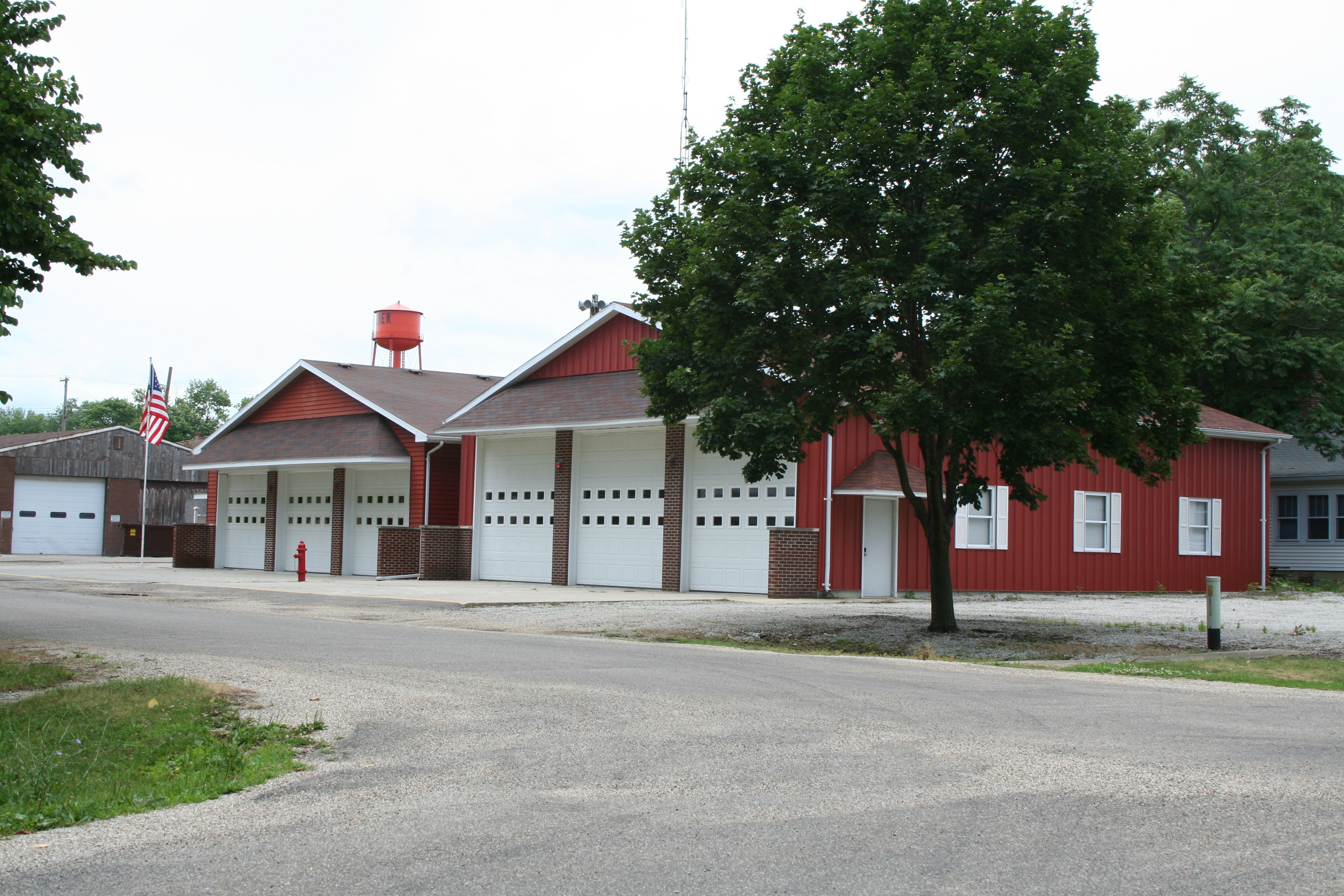
Fisher fire station and water tower, June 2007

== Education ==
The community is served by the Fisher Community Unit School District 1. The public schools are Fisher Grade School kindergarten through sixth grade, and the Fisher Junior/Senior High School, whose mascot is the Fisher "Bunnie." The Bunnies offer six girls' sports, seven boys' sports and two co-ed sports at the senior high school level and six competitive sports for junior-high students.

== See also ==
- List of municipalities in Illinois
