= Armstrong, Illinois =

Armstrong
- Unincorporated community
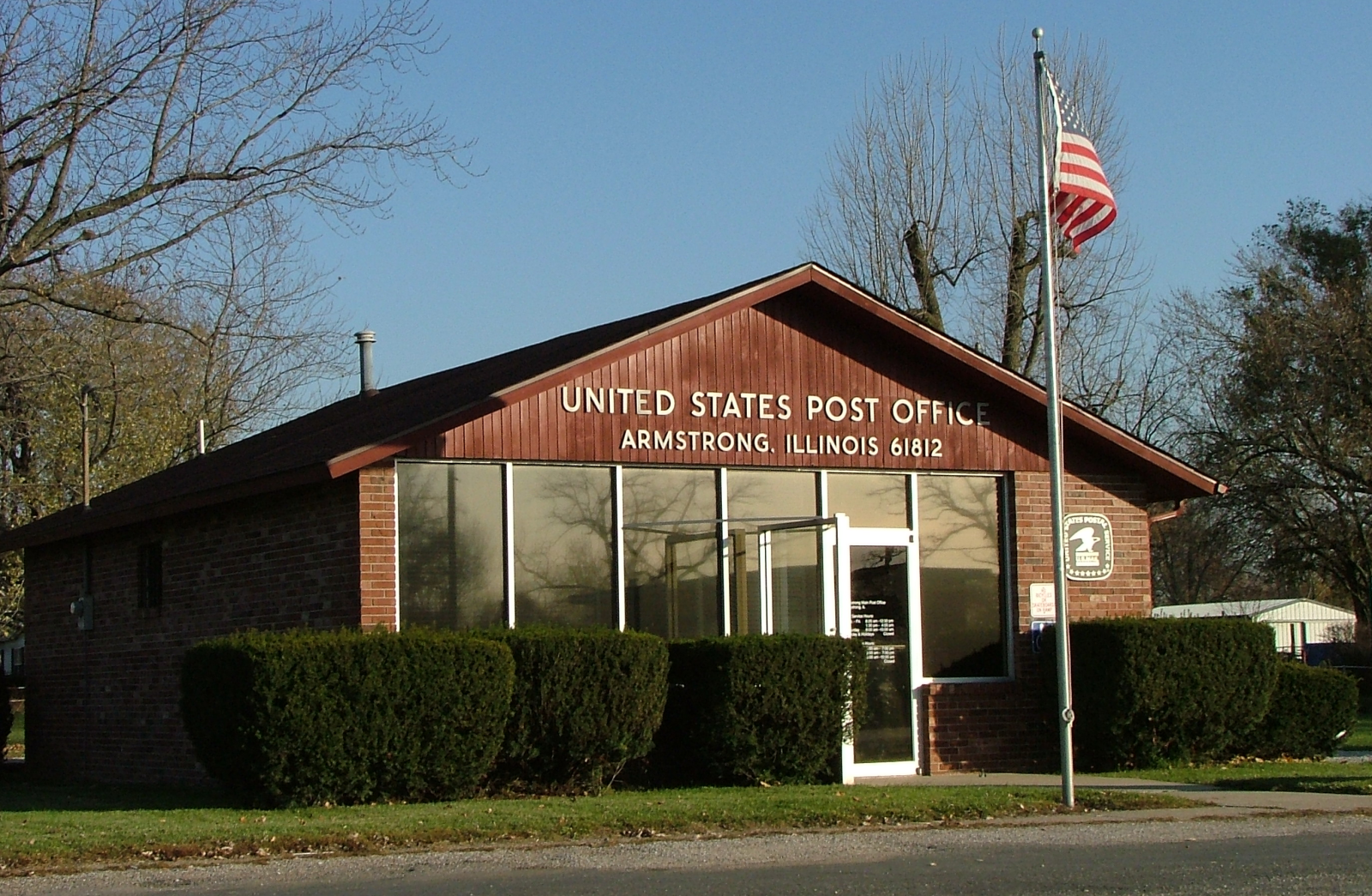
- The Armstrong post office

- Vermilion County's location in Illinois

- Armstrong's location in Vermilion County
- Coordinates: 40°18′23″N 87°52′40″W
- Country: United States
- State: Illinois
- County: Vermilion County
- Township: Middlefork Township
- Established: 1876
- Elevation: 696 ft (212 m)
- ZIP code: 61812
- Area code: 217
- GNIS feature ID: 0403620

Armstrong is an unincorporated community in Middlefork Township, Vermilion County, Illinois.

== History ==
Armstrong was laid out in 1876 on land owned by Thomas and Henry Armstrong; it was on the route of the Havana, Rantoul, and Eastern narrow-gauge railroad (which later became the Illinois Central Railroad).

On October 2, 1908, a fire destroyed many important buildings in Armstrong, including the general store, the harness shop, the blacksmith shop, the lumber yard, the opera house, the post office, and the grain elevator. Water was pumped by hand by residents to try to fight the fire, and water was also brought by rail from over a mile away; the town had no fire equipment.

== Geography ==
Armstrong is located in the northwestern part of the county, just northeast of the intersection of U.S. Route 136 and Illinois State Route 49. It is about four miles west of Potomac.

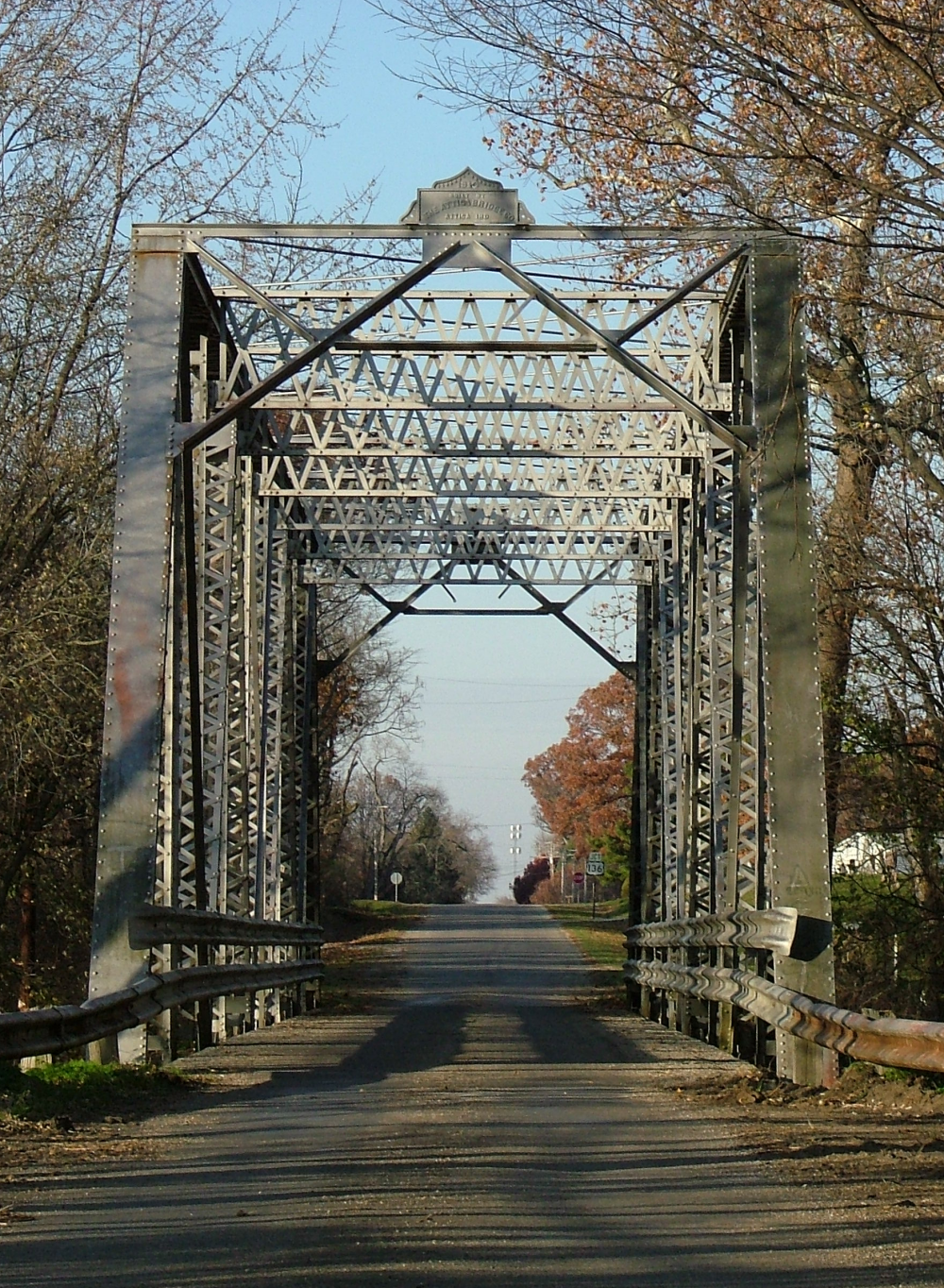
Looking north into Armstrong across the Middle Fork of the Vermilion River
