= Fisher Junior/Senior High School (Illinois) =

Location
- 211 West Division Street, Fisher, Illinois 61843; United States; 40°18′37″N 88°21′18″W

Information
- Established: 1895
- Principal: Brian Bajer
- Teaching staff: 22.91 (FTE)
- Grades: 7-12
- Enrollment: 286 (2023–2024)
- Student to teacher ratio: 12.48
- Colors: Orange and black
- Athletics conference: Heart of Illinois Conference
- Nickname: Bunnies
- Website: www.fisherk12.org

Fisher Junior-Senior High School is located in Fisher, Illinois, a small farming community near Champaign, Illinois. The current high school was built in 1963 and has been operating since the fall of 1964. Its first graduating class was in the spring of 1895. It is in a small town of approximately 1,800 people. FHS has approximately 300 students in grades 7–12.

== Academics ==
Fisher is located near several higher education facilities, such as University of Illinois Urbana-Champaign, Illinois State University, Millikin University, and Parkland College, allowing access for students.

== Sports ==
FHS offers, american football, golf, basketball, wrestling, cheer leading, volleyball, track and field, softball and baseball. In addition, FHS offers soccer via a co-op with Gibson City.

== Extracurricular activities ==
FHS has always tried to maintain a full agenda for its students and has made extracurricular activities available: band, chorus, plays, musicals, scholastic bowl and academic challenge (quizzes).

== Clubs ==
FHS has a variety of clubs and associations available:

- Math: this club participates in local competitions and events that are held at Parkland College in Champaign, Illinois
- Echo: FHS school newspaper
- Varsity Scholars: Athletes that maintain a GPA 4.5 out of 5 on the academic scale while playing varsity
- Student Council: The board of students set up to make decisions for the students to vote and set up events, such as homecoming and fund-raisers.
- Letter Winners: People who have either lettered in a sports, academics, or the musical department
- TNT: Teens need Teens is a peer-run and led drug awareness group whose goal is to educate and bring to light what is really happening with drugs and to encourage an anti-drug lifestyle.
- Beta: Members of the beta club, a branch of the National Honors Society, are teens who have maintained a GPA of 5.0 throughout the time they are in high school.
- GSA: A club committed to making the school a better place for people of all genders and sexualities.
- Science: A club that meets every Wednesday, for part of the school year, to perform experiments as a group.
