= Tremont High School =

Location
- 400 W Pearl St; Tremont, Illinois; 61568; United States
- Coordinates: 40.52725°N 89.49649°W

Information
- School district: 702
- Superintendent: Sean Berry
- Principal: Jill Uhlman
- Teaching staff: 24.53 (FTE)
- Grades: 9-12
- Enrollment: 287 (2023–2024)
- Student to teacher ratio: 11.70
- Campus type: Suburban
- Color
- Team name: Turks
- Website: School website

Tremont High School is a school in Tremont, Illinois and has an enrollment of 346 students. In 2006 the school won the Blue Ribbon Award.
