= Weldon, Illinois =

Weldon
- Village
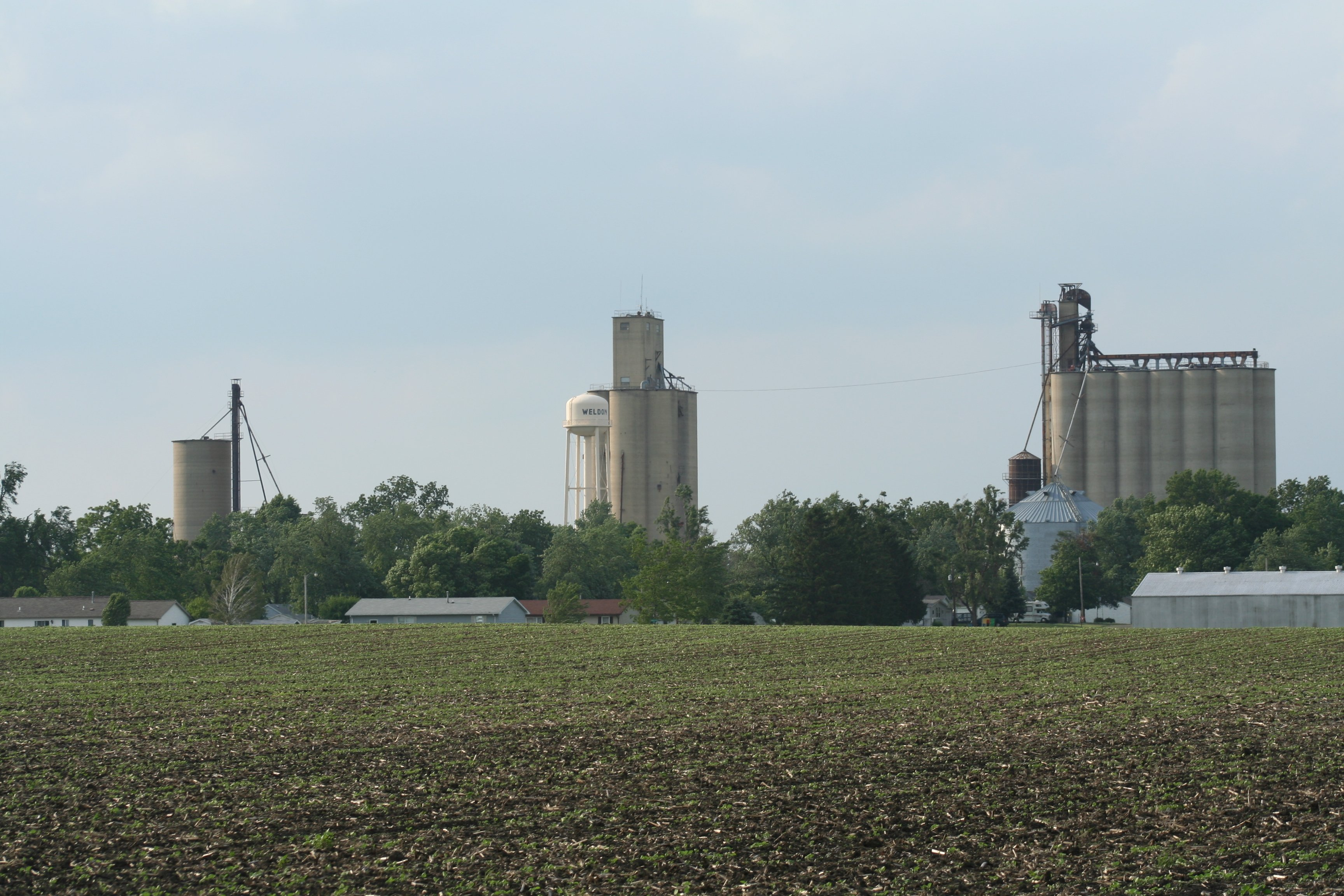
- Weldon, Illinois Water tower and Grain Elevators

- Location of Weldon in Witt County, Illinois.

- Location of Illinois in the United States
- Coordinates: 40°07′18″N 88°45′02″W
- Country: United States
- State: Illinois
- County: DeWitt

Area
  - Total: 0.27 sq mi (0.69 km^{2})
  - Land: 0.27 sq mi (0.69 km^{2})
  - Water: 0 sq mi (0.00 km^{2})
- Elevation: 709 ft (216 m)

Population (2020)
  - Total: 369
  - Density: 1,382.3/sq mi (533.71/km^{2})
- Time zone: UTC-6 (CST)
  - Summer (DST): UTC-5 (CDT)
- ZIP Code(s): 61882
- Area code: 217
- FIPS code: 17-79683
- GNIS feature ID: 2400120
- Wikimedia Commons: Weldon, Illinois
- Website: villageofweldon.org

Weldon is a village in Nixon Township, DeWitt County, Illinois, United States. The population was 369 at the 2020 census.

== Geography ==
According to the 2010 census, Weldon has a total area of 0.27 square miles (0.70 km^{2}), all land.

== Demographics ==
Historical population
Census	Pop.	Note	%±
1880	147		—
1900	536		—
1910	521		−2.8%
1920	573		10.0%
1930	499		−12.9%
1940	521		4.4%
1950	492		−5.6%
1960	449		−8.7%
1970	553		23.2%
1980	531		−4.0%
1990	361		−32.0%
2000	440		21.9%
2010	429		−2.5%
2020	369		−14.0%
U.S. Decennial Census

As of the 2020 census there were 369 people, 171 households, and 106 families residing in the village. The population density was 1,382.02 inhabitants per square mile (533.60/km^{2}). There were 180 housing units at an average density of 674.16 per square mile (260.29/km^{2}). The racial makeup of the village was 95.66% White, 0.27% from other races, and 4.07% from two or more races. Hispanic or Latino of any race were 0.27% of the population.

There were 171 households, out of which 23.4% had children under the age of 18 living with them, 43.27% were married couples living together, 15.79% had a female householder with no husband present, and 38.01% were non-families. 35.09% of all households were made up of individuals, and 15.20% had someone living alone who was 65 years of age or older. The average household size was 2.75 and the average family size was 2.19.

The village's age distribution consisted of 19.7% under the age of 18, 4.3% from 18 to 24, 21.6% from 25 to 44, 29.2% from 45 to 64, and 25.3% who were 65 years of age or older. The median age was 49.5 years. For every 100 females, there were 131.5 males. For every 100 females age 18 and over, there were 116.5 males.

The median income for a household in the village was $44,688, and the median income for a family was $58,929. Males had a median income of $36,705 versus $34,250 for females. The per capita income for the village was $26,537. About 8.5% of families and 9.9% of the population were below the poverty line, including 10.8% of those under age 18 and 4.2% of those age 65 or over.

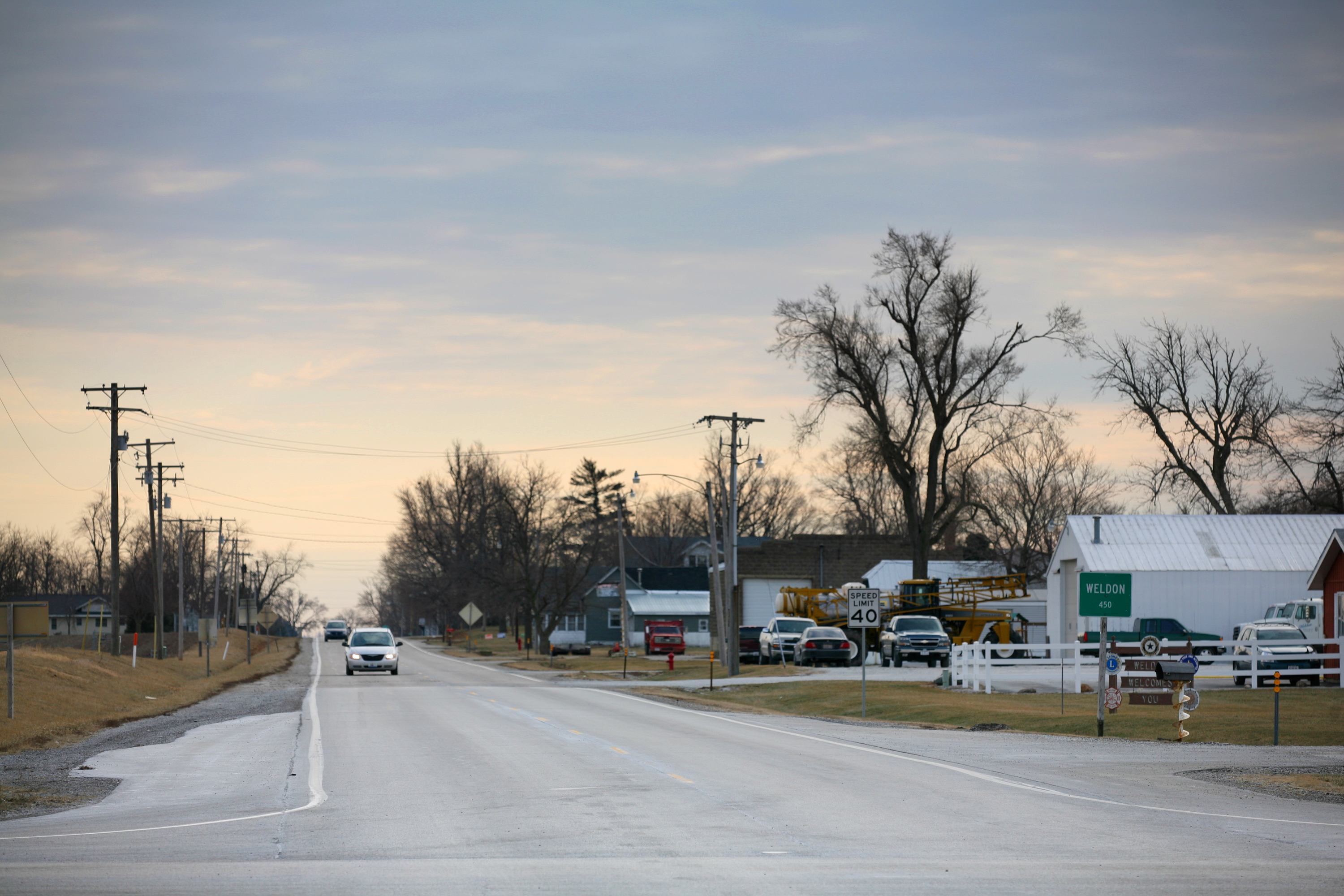
Weldon, Illinois, at the junction of state routes 10 and 48.

== Local high school ==
DeLand-Weldon Community Unit School District 57 services both towns and the surrounding areas. It is the smallest public high school in the state with a total enrollment of 50.
