= Prairie Central High School =

Coordinates: 40°45′7.1″N 88°30′23.2″W

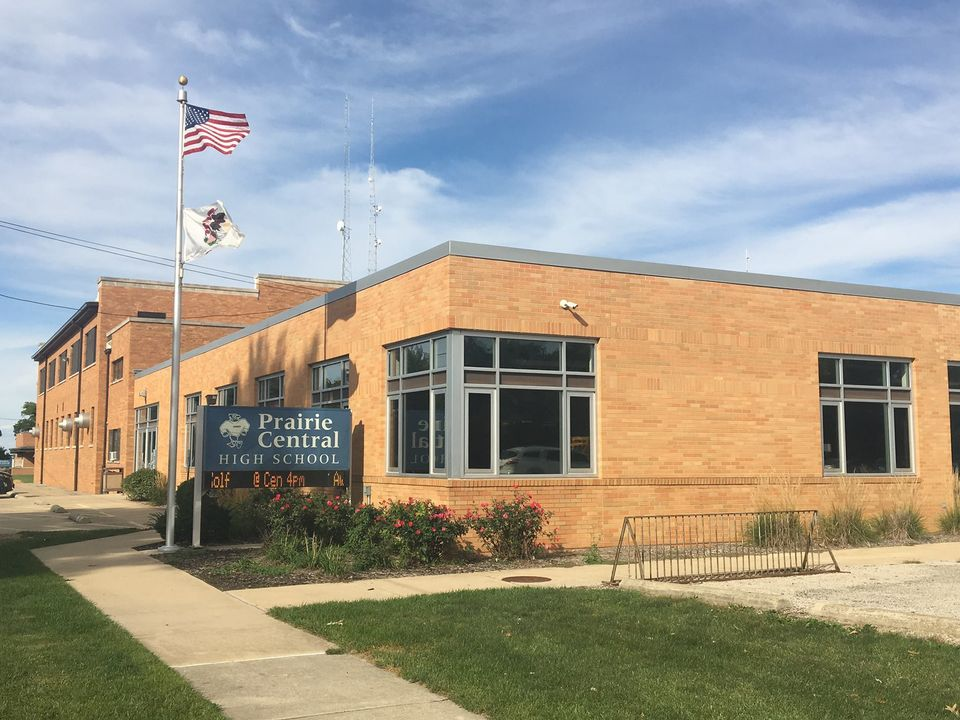
- The front of the school

Location
- 411 North 7th Street; Fairbury, Illinois 61739; USA

Information
- Type: Public secondary
- Motto: Pride in Excellence
- Established: 1985
- Principal: Wade Czerwonka
- Grades: 9–12
- Enrollment: 518 (2023-2024)
- Colors: Navy, white and Columbia blue
- Fight song: Mr. Touchdown U.S.A.
- Athletics: IHSA
- Athletics conference: Illini Prairie Conference
- Mascot: Huey the Hawk
- Team name: Hawks
- Website: www.prairiecentral.org/page/home011

Prairie Central High School is a public four-year high school in the Prairie Central Consolidated School District of central Illinois. It is located in Fairbury, Illinois.

== History ==
The consolidated Prairie Central district was created in 1985 by merging three districts. Those three districts' high schools were Fairbury-Cropsey High School, Forrest-Strawn-Wing High School, and Chatsworth High School. Upon completion of the merger, the new district chose to locate their high school in the building that was formerly known as Fairbury-Cropsey High School, which was founded in 1951. The building that had housed Forrest-Strawn-Wing High School—built just a couple of years prior to consolidation—was chosen to be the location of the new district's junior high school.

Upon the change of the school's name, the mascot and school colors were also changed. The new mascot selected was the Hawks, and the new colors were white, Columbia blue, and navy. The previous mascots and colors had been: FCHS Fighting Tartars (green and yellow gold), FSW Fighting Eskimos (red and black), and Chatsworth Bluebirds (blue and orange).

In 2004, the district further expanded with the addition of the students from Chenoa High School, which had been turned into Prairie Central Primary West, a school meant for Pre-kindergarten to first grade students.

On March 25, 2023, two of the most athletic seniors from the school, Dylan Bazzell (aged 18), and Drew Fehr (aged 17), died due to blunt force trauma in a skiing accident in Colorado.

== Athletics ==
Prairie Central High School offers a wide range of athletics including:

- Baseball
- Softball
- Basketball (Men's and Women's)
- Cheerleading
- Cross Country (Men´s and Woman´s)
- Football
- Golf (Men's and Women's)
- Swimming (Men's and Women's)
- Track (Men's and Women's)
- Volleyball
- Wrestling (Men´s and Woman´s)

== Competition ==
- The 2008 Marching Hawks band place first at the University of Illinois Marching Band Championships.
- The Prairie Central FFA's dairy team won nationals in Indiana in 2008.
