= Central High School (Clifton, Illinois) =

High school in Clifton, Illinois, United States

Coordinates: 40°57′34″N 87°55′04″W

Location
- 1134 East County Road 3100N; Clifton, (Iroquois County), Illinois 60927; United States

Information
- Type: Public high school
- Principal: Marc Shaner
- Staff: 24.15 (FTE)
- Enrollment: 305 (2023-2024)
- Student to teacher ratio: 12.63
- Colors: Royal blue and white
- Nickname: Comets

Clifton Central High School is a high school located in Clifton, Illinois, United States. The high school has 334 students in the 2012–2013 school year. The sports teams are called the Central Comets and the girls are the Lady Comets.

With over 300 computers, students have access to computers and technology throughout the district. The district offers Illinois Virtual High School courses to allow for additional classes available to students that are not offered within the district. Also, the Boys Cross Country team won State in 2018, which is Central's first team to win state as a team.
