= Cullom, Illinois =

- Village
- Location in Livingston County, Illinois
- Coordinates: 40°52′36″N 88°16′16″W
- Country: United States
- State: Illinois
- County: Livingston
- Township: Sullivan

Area
  - Total: 0.34 sq mi (0.87 km^{2})
  - Land: 0.34 sq mi (0.87 km^{2})
  - Water: 0 sq mi (0.00 km^{2})
- Elevation: 682 ft (208 m)

Population (2020)
  - Total: 520
  - Density: 1,552.8/sq mi (599.54/km^{2})
- Time zone: UTC-6 (CST)
  - Summer (DST): UTC-5 (CDT)
- ZIP code: 60929
- Area code: 815
- FIPS code: 17-18030
- GNIS feature ID: 2398658
- Website: villageofcullomillinois.com

Cullom is a village in Livingston County, Illinois, United States. Cullom is situated twenty miles east of Pontiac which is the county seat, and is one mile west of the Ford County line. As of the 2020 census, Cullom had a population of 520.

== History ==
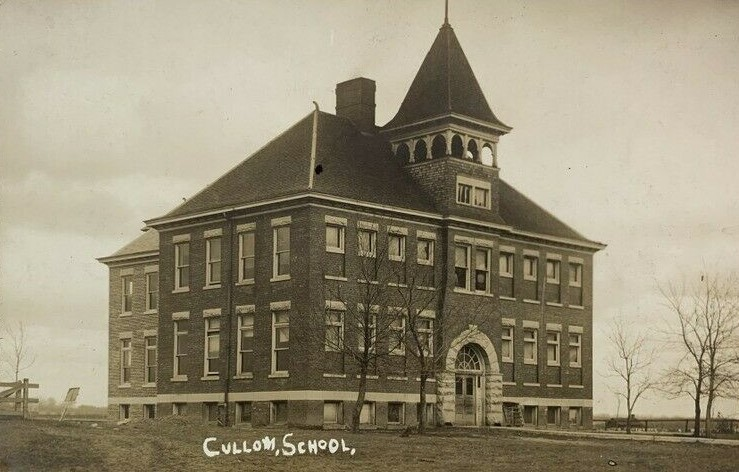
School (1912)

Cullom owes its beginning to the Illinois Central Railroad which reached the village in 1878. The location of the village was established by Frederick Hack who granted a 90-foot right of way across his farm and paid a cash bonus of $4000 to the railroad company. Hack platted and laid out the village and donated forty acres of land on which to build it.

The village was named for Shelby Moore Cullom, 17th governor of Illinois. The story was that Mr. Hack wanted the town called Jeffrey after the man who was roadmaster of the Illinois Central Railroad at that time. Jeffrey wanted the town called Hack but he declined the honor. The two men then compromised and called it Cullom. The governor was notified of their decision, and he sent a draft for $25, to be given to the denomination that built the first church in the village. The money was given to the Methodists which built the first church in 1880.

The main street going through the business district was then called Hack Street in honor of Mr. Hack. The first building was moved here from Chatsworth, Illinois in the fall of 1878 by John Tims. It was used for a lumber office. J. W. White and Dr. Keck arrived about the same time from Barrington, Illinois and shipped the first lumber into town with which to erect a building that was later used as a saloon.

James Righter moved a two-story frame building from Sullivan Center, Illinois which was used for a general store. Another store building was erected on Maple Street by Dr. Kay and E. K. Brown which was later known as Crosten's Drug Store.

A post office has been in operation at Cullom since 1878. John Weinland was the first postmaster. He had a small building near the stockyards and traded hogs and grain as a sideline. He also sold building lots for Mr. Hack, some of them selling for $15.

Peter Gingry and Andrew Keck Sr. operated the first saloon and Mike Harshbarger ran a pool hall in an adjoining room. Cullom's first train depot was a small “two by four” building which was used until a better one was moved from Kempton, Illinois on a flat car. James Fitzmaurice was the first permanent station agent. David Farmer built a brick building, known as the Cullom Hotel, on Maple Street which was used for many purposes. Some of the early businessmen rented space there to start a store before buying a building of their own. The first school in Cullom was built about 1880. It was a frame building and consisted of two rooms. The primary room on the lower floor and the intermediate grades on the upper floor.

Although Cullom was started in 1878, it was not incorporated until July 27, 1882, the charter being signed by James A. Rose, Secretary of State. Election of the village officers was held in August with the following being elected: Mayor: Jesse Hatfield; Trustees: Frederick Hack, Dr. Z. L. Kay, James Dorsey, J.W. White, A. Loubke; Clerk: W. C. Bullard.

The town was enlarged in 1901 and 1902 with the Hertlein's addition to the south and east and Peterdorf's addition to the west. A few years later Heckelmans addition to the east and north further enlarged the village. By the early 1900s the population of Cullom had risen to over 500. H. G. Steiman of Melvin, Illinois came to Cullom and opened the first bank called the First National Bank in 1907.

At one time Cullom had four grocery stores, five saloons, two hotels, a bank, a milliner shop, a hardware store, a drug store, a post office, a clothing store, a pool and billiard hall, a cobbler, a baker, a confectionery and ice cream parlor, a shoe store, two barbershops, a tin shop, two blacksmith shops, a glove factory, two livery barns, a cement factory, three doctors, a weekly newspaper, a tile factory, and two grain elevators.

== Geography ==
Cullom is located in eastern Livingston County and is the only incorporated community in Sullivan Township.

Illinois Route 116 passes through the village, leading west 20 miles (32 km) to Pontiac, the county seat, and east 16 miles (26 km) to Ashkum. Route 116 connects to Interstate 55 on the west side of Pontiac and to Interstate 57 on the west side of Ashkum.

According to the 2021 census gazetteer files, Cullom has a total area of 0.34 square miles (0.88 km^{2}), all land.

== Demographics ==
Historical population
Census	Pop.	Note	%±
1890	200		—
1900	456		128.0%
1910	579		27.0%
1920	631		9.0%
1930	489		−22.5%
1940	509		4.1%
1950	492		−3.3%
1960	555		12.8%
1970	572		3.1%
1980	608		6.3%
1990	568		−6.6%
2000	563		−0.9%
2010	555		−1.4%
2020	520		−6.3%
U.S. Decennial Census

As of the 2020 census there were 520 people, 220 households, and 153 families residing in the village. The population density was 1,552.24 inhabitants per square mile (599.32/km^{2}). There were 272 housing units at an average density of 811.94 per square mile (313.49/km^{2}). The racial makeup of the village was 94.23% White, 0.00% African American, 0.19% Native American, 0.00% Asian, 0.00% Pacific Islander, 0.96% from other races, and 4.62% from two or more races. Hispanic or Latino of any race were 2.69% of the population.

There were 220 households, out of which 26.8% had children under the age of 18 living with them, 44.55% were married couples living together, 19.09% had a female householder with no husband present, and 30.45% were non-families. 22.73% of all households were made up of individuals, and 11.36% had someone living alone who was 65 years of age or older. The average household size was 2.59 and the average family size was 2.28.

The village's age distribution consisted of 21.2% under the age of 18, 6.4% from 18 to 24, 30% from 25 to 44, 24.8% from 45 to 64, and 17.8% who were 65 years of age or older. The median age was 38.0 years. For every 100 females, there were 74.0 males. For every 100 females age 18 and over, there were 82.0 males.

The median income for a household in the village was $50,000, and the median income for a family was $55,750. Males had a median income of $40,179 versus $30,179 for females. The per capita income for the village was $25,328. About 22.2% of families and 22.7% of the population were below the poverty line, including 47.1% of those under age 18 and 5.6% of those age 65 or over.

== Points of interest ==
In 2002 American Legion Skinner-Trost Post 122 dedicated a monument to all the local area veterans, living and dead, at the West Lawn Cemetery located on W. Jackson Street. The monument includes etched emblems of all branches of military service, US Air Force, US Army, US Marine Corps, United States Navy, Coast Guard, National Guard and Reserves. Names are updated as members of the community join the military and are discharged.

Tri Point High School serves grade 9-12 students from Cullom, Cabery, Kempton, Piper City, and Stelle.

== Notable people ==
Arnold Orville Beckman (April 10, 1900 – May 18, 2004) was a chemist, inventor, investor, and philanthropist born in Cullom.
