= Flanagan-Cornell Unit 74 =

School district in Livingston County, Illinois, United States

Coordinates: 40°52′18.1″N 88°51′26.2″W

Flanagan-Cornell Unit 74 is the first hybrid unit school district formed in the U.S. state of Illinois. It was formed in 2008 from Flanagan Consolidated Unit School District 4 and Cornell Community High School District 70 in Livingston County, Illinois. It operates Flanagan-Cornell High School, Flanagan Junior High School, Flanagan Grade School, and the district offices from a single campus in Flanagan. The district is a "partial elementary unit" hybrid district, in which both grade school and high school education are provided to the Flanagan area, but only high school education is provided to the Cornell area where Cornell Community Consolidated School District 426 continues to provide elementary education.

== Cornell High School ==
For about the last 20 years of District 70, it did not operate a high school; students were sent to Flanagan High School, and the tuition paid from District 70 to District 4.
