= List of City of Danville Historic Landmarks =

List of local historic sites in Danville, Illinois

Historic Landmarks and Districts is a designation of the City of Danville Historic Preservation Commission (HPC). Many of these landmarks are also listed on the National Register of Historic Places.

== Historic Preservation Commission ==
The City of Danville's Historic Preservation Commission (HPC) approves new historic districts and landmarks. It was created in 1990 and is recognized as a Certified Local Government by the Illinois Historic Preservation Agency.

=== Individual landmarks ===
Landmark Name	Image	Location	Built	Designation date	NRHP date
New Holland Apartments		324 N. Vermilion St.	1905	N/A	November 16, 1988
Stoney Creek Stone Arch Bridge		Main St. & Stoney Creek	1895	February 2, 1991	May 16, 1986
Lamon House		1031 N. Logan Ave.	1850	March 27, 1991	N/A
Vermilion County Museum (Fithian House)		116 N. Gilbert St.	1855	March 27, 1991	May 1, 1975
DACC Buildings 5,6,7,8,9,10 & 17		2000 E. Main St.	1898	April 29, 1991	
Old Germantown Fire Station		901 N. Bowman Ave.	1905	May 6, 1991	N/A
Pearson/Frisch Home		408 Elizabeth St.	1880	June 17, 1991	N/A
Old Fire Station #2		705 N. Walnut St.	1898	July 22, 1991	N/A
Bookwalter House		1701 N. Logan Ave.	1922	March 23, 1994	N/A
Harrison Park Clubhouse		1300 W. Voorhees St.	1911	April 27, 1994	N/A
Fischer Theater		156 N. Vermilion St.	1884	June 29, 1994	2001
Garfield Place		Garfield Place	1938	August 18, 1993	N/A
Carnegie Library		307 N. Vermilion St.	1904	October 25, 1995	May 9, 2002
Brick Street Preservation				November 21, 1995	N/A
Jewell House		427 N. Hazel St.	1910	October 17, 1996	N/A
National Guard Armory		135 N. Hazel St.	1922	October 4, 1999	N/A
John Reynolds House		22 McVey	1893	May 11, 2000	N/A
Dale Building		101 N. Vermilion	1873	June 22, 2000	January 27, 2000
210-212 W. North		210-212 W. North St.	1902	December 10, 1999	November 8, 2000 Delisted January 2, 2020
112 Pine St.		112 Pine St.	1903	November 8, 2000	N/A
Bresee Tower		4 N. Vermilion	1918	October 10, 2002	N/A
Illiana Genealogical & Historical Society		215 W. North St	1890	2001	N/A
Taft Victory Monument		2 S. Gilbert St..		2006	N/A
Federal Building/U.S. Courthouse		201 N. Vermilion St.	1911	N/A	November 22, 2016

=== Historic Districts ===
==== Local Historic Districts ====
- Lincoln Park Historic District

== See also ==
- National Register of Historic Places listings in Vermilion County, Illinois
