= National Register of Historic Places listings in Vermilion County, Illinois =

Location of Vermilion County in Illinois

This is a list of properties on the National Register of Historic Places in Vermilion County, Illinois.

This is intended to be a complete list of the properties and districts on the National Register of Historic Places in Vermilion County, Illinois, United States. Latitude and longitude coordinates are provided for many National Register properties and districts; these locations may be seen together in a map.

There are 13 properties and districts listed on the National Register in the county. Another two properties were once listed but have been removed.

This National Park Service list is complete through NPS recent listings posted September 26, 2025.

== Current listings ==
	Name on the Register	Image	Date listed	Location	City or town	Description
1	Adams Building	Adams Building	November 15, 2000 (#00001337)	139-141 N. Vermilion St. 40°07′39″N 87°37′47″W	Danville	
2	Collins Archeological District	Collins Archeological District	August 3, 1979 (#79000872)	West of Lake Mingo at Kennekuk County Park; 40°12′28″N 87°44′32″W	Danville	Part of Kennekuk County Park since the 1970s
3	Dale Building	Dale Building	January 27, 2000 (#99001711)	101-103 N. Vermilion St. 40°07′35″N 87°37′47″W	Danville	
4	Danville Branch, National Home for Disabled Volunteer Soldiers Historic District	Danville Branch, National Home for Disabled Volunteer Soldiers Historic District	January 30, 1992 (#91001973)	1900 and 2000 E. Main St. 40°07′28″N 87°35′15″W	Danville	
5	Danville Public Library	Danville Public Library	November 30, 1978 (#78003064)	307 N. Vermilion St. 40°07′46″N 87°37′46″W	Danville	This building now serves as the Vermilion County War Museum.
6	First National Bank Building	First National Bank Building	September 13, 2018 (#00001335)	2-4 N. Vermilion St. 40°07′29″N 87°37′49″W	Danville	
7	Fischer Theatre	Fischer Theatre	September 16, 2001 (#01000978)	158-164 N. Vermilion St. 40°07′41″N 87°37′49″W	Danville	
8	Fithian House	Fithian House	May 1, 1975 (#75002060)	116 N. Gilbert St. 40°07′39″N 87°38′10″W	Danville	
9	Holland Apartments	Holland Apartments	November 16, 1988 (#88002232)	324-326 N. Vermilion St. 40°07′48″N 87°37′49″W	Danville	
10	Hoopes-Cunningham Mansion	Hoopes-Cunningham Mansion	September 11, 1985 (#85002307)	424 E. Penn St. 40°27′59″N 87°39′56″W	Hoopeston	
11	Hoopeston Carnegie Public Library	Hoopeston Carnegie Public Library	May 9, 2002 (#02000458)	110 N. Fourth St. 40°28′07″N 87°39′54″W	Hoopeston	
12	Stone Arch Bridge	Stone Arch Bridge	May 16, 1986 (#86001087)	760-800 E. Main St. 40°07′29″N 87°37′03″W	Danville	
13	United States Post Office and Court House	United States Post Office and Court House	November 22, 2016 (#16000785)	201 North Vermilion St. 40°07′42″N 87°37′48″W	Danville	

== Former listing ==
	Name on the Register	Image	Date listed	Date removed	Location	City or town	Description
1	Building at 210–212 West North Street	Building at 210–212 West North Street	November 8, 2000 (#00001334)	January 2, 2020	210–212 West North St. 40°07′34″N 87°38′00″W	Danville	Demolished c. 2006.
2	Temple Building	Temple Building	December 1, 2000 (#00001457)	March 14, 2002	102-106 N. Vermilion St. 40°07′35″N 87°37′48″W	Danville	Building demolished by the City of Danville in 2002

== See also ==
- List of National Historic Landmarks in Illinois
- National Register of Historic Places listings in Illinois
