= Village Mall =

Village Mall may refer to:

- Village Mall (Danville, Illinois), a shopping mall in Danville, Illinois.
- Village Mall, a defunct mall in Willingboro, New Jersey
- Village Mall, a former shopping mall in Cleveland, Tennessee, a predecessor of the Bradley Square Mall.
- Village Mall, the former name of Auburn Mall in Auburn, Alabama.
- Villager Mall, a former name of Village on Park Street in Madison

== See also ==
- The Village Shopping Center in Gary, Indiana
