= Fithian =

Fithian is a surname. Notable people with the surname include:

- David Fithian (born 1964), president of Clark University
- Floyd Fithian (1928–2003), American educator and politician
- George W. Fithian (1854–1921), American politician
- Lisa Fithian, American political activist
- Philip Vickers Fithian (1747–1776), American diarist
- William Fithian (1799–1890), American physician and politician

== See also ==
- Fithian, Illinois, village in Oakwood Township, Vermilion County
- Fithian House, historic house in Danville, Illinois
