= Schlarman Academy =

Location
- 2112 North Vermilion Street (North Campus); 1307 Walnut Street (South Campus); Danville, (Vermilion County), Illinois 61832; United States; 40°9′39″N 87°37′57″W

Information
- Type: Private, Coeducational
- Religious affiliation: Roman Catholic
- Established: 1945
- Founder: Bishop Joseph Schlarman
- Principal: Tracy Cherry
- Chaplain: Fr. John Cyr
- Grades: 9–12
- Enrollment: South Campus (K-6): 254 (2011); North Campus (7-12): 125 (2011) (2011)
- Average class size: 18.6 (K-8)
- Student to teacher ratio: 10 to 1
- Campus type: Split; North holds grades 7-12; South holds grades K-6
- Colors: Blue and Gold
- Fight song: Schlarman Fight Song
- Mascot: "Topper" the Hilltopper ghost
- Team name: Hilltoppers
- Accreditation: North Central Association of Colleges and Schools
- Yearbook: Schlarman Summit
- Diocese: Roman Catholic Diocese of Peoria
- Athletic Director: None
- Website: www.schlarman.com

Schlarman Academy is a private, Roman Catholic academy composed of two campuses in Danville, Illinois, United States. Previously, the Vermilion County Catholic grade schools included: Holy Family, St. Mary’s, and St. Paul’s. In July 2011, these schools consolidated with Schlarman High School to form what is now known as Schlarman Academy. The "South Campus" is a combined primary and middle school (kindergarten through 6th grade) located in the building formerly known as St. Paul School, located at the corner of Walnut St. and Vermilion St. The "North Campus" is a secondary school (7th grade through 12th grade) campus located in the building formerly known as Schlarman High School at the corner of Winter St. and Vermilion St. The school was established in 1945 and named after Archbishop Joseph Schlarman, bishop of the Diocese of Peoria at that time.

Schlarman's mascot is The Hilltopper, because the secondary school campus sits on top of a hill close to Lake Vermilion. It is a relatively small school in terms of enrollment, but the north campus is quite expansive and has a large gymnasium. Its north campus comprises one of three high schools in Danville, the others being the city's sole public high school, Danville High School, several blocks away and First Baptist Christian School located across Vermilion Street from the south campus. Schlarman Academy is a school of the Roman Catholic Diocese of Peoria.

== Athletics ==
Schlarman competes in the IESA and IHSA, and is part of the Vermilion Valley Conference in sports such as baseball, basketball, football, softball and volleyball.

== Notable alumni ==
- Zeke Bratkowski (American football), former NFL player
