= Slumberland =

Slumberland may relate to:

- Slumberland Furniture, a furniture retailer in the midwestern United States
- Slumberland Records, originally a Washington, D.C. area, now Oakland CA-based independent indiepop label
- Slumberland (film), a 2022 film adaptation of the comic strip Little Nemo in Slumberland
- Slumberland Ltd, a UK bed manufacturer, now a subsidiary of Investcorp
- Slumberland, an album by American Idol winner Lee DeWyze
- Slumberland, a novel by Paul Beatty
