= New Tech High School =

New Tech High School may refer to:

- Danville New Tech High, Danville, Illinois
- New Tech High at Zion-Benton East, Zion, Illinois
- Calumet New Tech High School, Gary, Indiana
- Belton New Tech High School, Belton, Texas
- New Tech High School (Dallas), Texas
- New Tech High School at Coppell, Texas

== See also ==
- Anderson New Technology High School, Anderson, California
- New Technology High School, Napa, California
- Lake Area New Tech Early College High School, New Orleans, Louisiana
- NuTech (disambiguation)
