= Quincy Town Center =

Mixed-use development in Quincy, Illinois, USA

- Location: Quincy, Illinois
- Coordinates: 39.93726°N 91.36222°W
- Opened: 1978
- Manager: Cullinan Properties
- Num. of stores: 50+
- Num. of anchor tenants: 4
- Floor area: 542,462 square feet
- Floors: 1
- Public transit: Quincy Transit Lines
- Website: www.quincytowncenter.com

Quincy Town Center is a shopping mall and office complex in Quincy, Illinois. It opened in 1958 as an outdoor complex called American Legion Miracle Mile Town and Country Shopping Center. It was converted to an indoor complex, which opened on November 14, 1978 as Quincy Mall. It was renamed Quincy Town Center in 2021. The center's anchor tenants are Dunham's Sports, Slumberland Furniture, Quincy Medical Group, and VIP Cinemas. Both shopping centers were created by Don M. Casto Organization of Columbus, Ohio. In 2006, the mall was purchased by Cullinan Properties.

== History ==
The original outdoor shopping center, American Legion Miracle Mile Town and Country Shopping Center, opened in 1958. The land had been purchased from the local American Legion. The center launched with Kresge’s, W.T. Grant, National Supermarkets, Kroger food stores and Shoppers Fair anchoring the mile-long strip mall. In 1968, the center's name was shortened to Town & Country Shopping Center, and the Town & Country Cinema was added. As its 20th anniversary approached, many leases were set to lapse, and Casto planned to build an entirely new shopping mall 1.5 miles to the west on Broadway and 48th Street. However, a revised plan enclosed the mall, which was relaunched as Quincy Mall on November 14, 1978. The mall was anchored by Bergner's and Sears, with J. C. Penney added in 1982. In 2006, Cullinan Properties bought the mall from Casto. Six years later, Cullinan asked the city of Quincy to expand a redevelopment agreement made in 2006.

JCPenney closed in April 2015. Slumberland Furniture opened in the space in 2017. Sears closed on August 11, 2018. Bergner's closed on August 28, 2018, when its parent company Bon-Ton went out of business. In 2019, VIP Cinemas joined the mall as an anchor tenant. Quincy Medical Group converted the former Bergner's anchor building into a cancer institute and surgery center in 2020.

In March 2021, Cullinan Properties rebranded the mall as Quincy Town Center.

Dunham's Sports opened in the former Sears in December 2024.
