= Village Mall (Danville, Illinois) =

- Location: Danville, Illinois, United States
- Coordinates: 40.17223°N 87.62838°W
- Address: 2917 North Vermilion Street
- Opened: 1975
- Developer: SES Development Company
- Owner: T Danville
- Num. of stores: 30+
- Num. of anchor tenants: 12 (8 open, 4 vacant)
- Floor area: 545,000 square feet (51,000 m^{2})
- Floors: 1
- Public transit: DMT

Village Mall is a shopping mall in Danville, Illinois in the United States. Opened in 1975, the mall's anchor stores are County Market, Pet Supplies Plus, Ross Dress for Less, Citi Trends, Shoe Sensation, and Slumberland Furniture. There are 4 vacant anchor store that were once Carson's, Burlington, Dunham's Sports, and Sears. It is managed by T Danville, a division of Tabani Group.

== History ==
Village Mall was developed in the 1970s by SES Development Company. The first store to open was an Ayr-Way discount store in 1972, which later became Target. It was followed by a National Supermarkets and a Meis department store, which was later sold to Elder-Beerman. The mall itself opened in 1975. J. C. Penney was added in 1985. Sears, which previously had a store in downtown Danville, was offered an incentive by the city to move to the mall in the early 1990s.

Target closed in 1997 due to low sales; by 1999, the former Target location was occupied by Hobby Lobby. J. C. Penney closed its Danville store in 2001 along with two others in Illinois. In 2004, a wing of the mall was renovated to make room for a Goody's clothing store. The former J. C. Penney store became Steve & Barry's in 2006. That same year, several anchors were proposed for the mall, including Old Navy and Dunham's Sports. County Market, which replaced National Supermarket, was also expanded.

Hobby Lobby, Steve & Barry's, and Goody's all closed in 2008, the latter two due to bankruptcy of the chains. The loss of these stores led to rumors that the mall would close or be converted to other uses, or that Elder-Beerman or Sears would relocate to elsewhere in town.

Despite these closures, Pet Supplies Plus opened in part of the former Hobby Lobby. By 2010, the last restaurant had closed in the food court. Elder-Beerman was re-branded Carson's in 2011, and Dunham's Sports filled the rest of the former Hobby Lobby. The former Goody's space became Ross Dress for Less in mid-2012. In mid-2013, Burlington Coat Factory opened in the former J. C. Penney/Steve & Barry's space. The addition of new stores brought occupancy levels up to 78 percent. In September 2014, Sears announced that it would close the Village Mall store. In mid-2015, a Jo-Ann Fabrics was added to the mall, while the city of Danville offered an incentive to the Slumberland Furniture chain to open a store in part of the former Sears.

On January 31, 2018, The Bon-Ton Stores announced that Carson's would be closing as part of a plan to close 42 stores nationwide. The store closed in April 2018. On April 18, 2018, it was announced that The Bon-Ton Stores would be going out of business due to bankruptcy. AMC closed its theater following showtimes of December 11, 2022.
