= Harrison Park Golf Course =

- Interactive map of Harrison Park Golf Course
- 40.147279°N 87.653732°W

Club information
- Location: Danville, Illinois, USA
- Established: 1928
- Type: Public / Municipal
- Operator: City of Danville
- Total holes: 18
- Website: Official website
- Par: 71
- Course record: 61 Andy Bott

The Harrison Park Golf Course and Clubhouse at Harrison Park, is located in Danville, Illinois.

The course is located on 235 acres (0.95 km^{2}) near the North Fork of the Vermilion River.

It has 100% weather protection all year round
