= Stone Arch Bridge (Danville, Illinois) =

- U.S. National Register of Historic Places
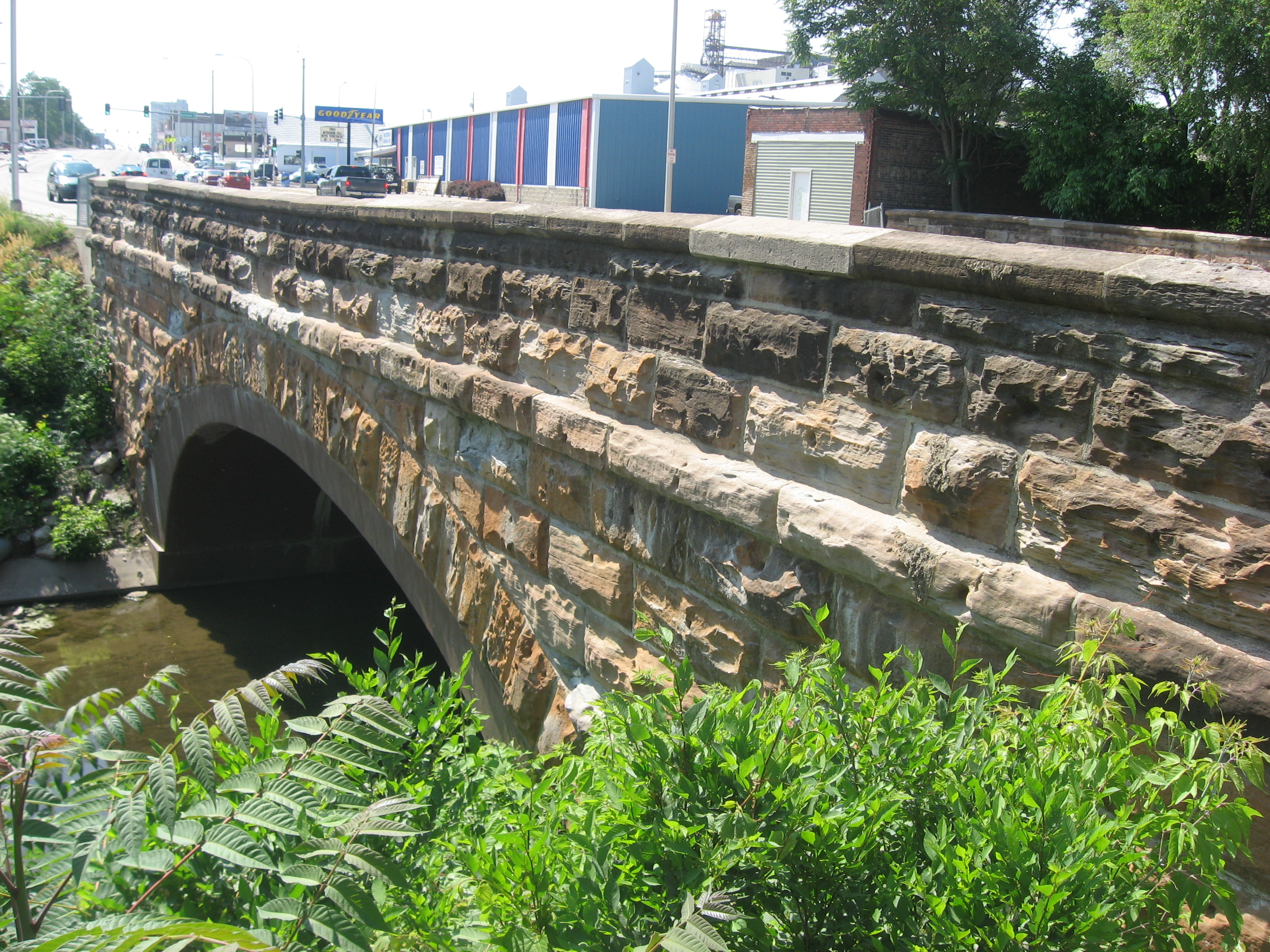
- Southern (downstream) side of the bridge

- Location within Illinois Location within the United States
- Location: 760-800 US 136 (East Main Street), Danville, Illinois
- Coordinates: 40°7′29″N 87°37′3″W
- Area: less than one acre
- Built: 1895
- Architect: Beard, John
- Architectural style: Segmental Arch
- NRHP reference No.: 86001087
- Added to NRHP: May 16, 1986

The Stone Arch Bridge is a bridge in Danville, Illinois, which carries U.S. Route 136 (US 136; East Main Street) across Stony Creek. The segmental arch bridge is 92 feet (28 m) long and built with sandstone. The bridge was built in the 1890s to facilitate Danville's expansion during an industrial boom. As various geographic and political limitations prevented the city from expanding in any directions but east and southeast, the city grew over Stony Creek, necessitating a new bridge. Mayor John Beard commissioned the bridge; during the 1890s, Beard and political rival John Cannon clashed over many issues, and Beard most likely built the bridge to demonstrate his political effectiveness. The bridge is the only segmented arch bridge remaining in east-central Illinois and is one of five stone arch bridges in the region.

The bridge was listed on the National Register of Historic Places in 1986.

== See also ==
- List of bridges on the National Register of Historic Places in Illinois
- National Register of Historic Places listings in Vermilion County, Illinois
