= Red Mask Players =

Coordinates: 40.1348°N 87.6298°W

Red Mask Players, Inc., founded in 1936, is one of the oldest community theaters in Illinois. It is housed in the Kathryn Randolph Theater in Danville, Illinois.

Kathryn Randolph, the company's founder and first director, had previously served as a dramatic coach to William Jennings Bryan.

Dick Van Dyke made his theatrical debut with the company in 1946 in Rebecca.
