= William Fithian =

American physician and politician

Member of the Illinois Senate from the Vermilion County district
- In office 1838 – 1846
- Preceded by: John W. Vance
- Succeeded by: Josiah McRoberts

Personal details
- Born: April 7, 1799 Cincinnati, Ohio, US
- Died: April 5, 1890 (aged 90)
- Party: Whig Party; Republican
- Profession: Physician

William Fithian (April 7, 1799 – April 5, 1890) was an American mesical doctor and politician reputedly born in Cincinnati, Ohio. Moving to Danville, Illinois after success in medicine, he became a supporter of the Whig Party. Fithian served in the Illinois General Assembly for ten years, mostly in the Senate. A supporter of Abraham Lincoln, Fithian was appointed a Provost Marshal for the Civil War.

== Biography ==
William Fithian was born in Cincinnati, Ohio, on April 7, 1799. One of America's Oldest Physicians, he trained as a printer, once typing a volume of enactments by the Ohio General Assembly. With the money made from that job, he studied medicine. After three years, he was awarded a diploma. Under the state laws at the time, this also entitled him to be an Associate Justice of the county court. In 1826, he decided to move west to Danville, Illinois, then a town of a few hundred people. He would remain in Danville until his death.

Fithian became involved with the local Whig Party. He was elected to the Illinois House of Representatives in 1834, serving a two-year term. In 1838, he successfully ran for the Illinois Senate and served a pair of four-year terms. While serving in the legislature, he was frequently consulted by other members for medical advice. Fithian hired Abraham Lincoln as an attorney six times. Lincoln also advised Fithian on real estate transactions in two Illinois counties. When the Republican Party was formed in 1856, Fithian was named a presidential elector. He campaigned on behalf of Lincoln for President in 1860.

During the Civil War, Lincoln appointed Fithian the Provost Marshal of the 7th Congressional District of Illinois. He also served as a civilian doctor, working in the hospital in Leetown near the Battle of Pea Ridge. At the end of the conflict, he returned to the practice of medicine.

Fithian married four times and had two surviving sons. He continued to practice medicine until about two years before his death at the age of 90 on April 5, 1890. Fithian's House in Danville was recognized with a listing on the National Register of Historic Places on May 1, 1975, and it is now the Vermilion County Museum. He is the namesake of Fithian, Illinois, near Danville.
