= NuTech =

NuTech may refer to:

- NuTech Digital
- NuTech Solutions

== See also ==
- New Tech (disambiguation)
- Nutec
- NU-Tech
- Nuctech Company
- NOTECHS
