= The Village Shopping Center =

- Location: Gary, Indiana
- Coordinates: 41.553539°N 87.357593°W
- Address: 3596 Village Court
- Opened: 1955
- Num. of stores: 30+
- Num. of anchor tenants: 1
- Floor area: 304,725 square feet
- Floors: 1
- Public transit: GPTC
- Website: http://areasold.com/listing/village-shopping-center

The Village Shopping Center is an enclosed shopping mall in Gary, Indiana. Built in 1955, it includes vacant anchors last occupied by Marshalls and US Factory Outlets.

== History ==
Village Shopping Center opened in 1955. It was expanded in 1958 when Montgomery Ward opened a two-story, 122,965 square foot store. Other tenants included Kresge (later McCrory), and Kroger.

The Montgomery Ward store was changed to a closeout format before closing. Goldblatt's moved into the mall in 1985, taking part of the former Montgomery Ward with Aldi taking the rest. J.C. Penney was the last department store to leave the mall, doing so in 1995. It became US Factory Outlets in 1997. AJWright replaced the former Kresge/McCrory, and Ames briefly replaced the former Goldblatt's. The former Ames was later divided into mall space, while Aldi moved out in 2004. Marshalls opened in 2011 following the closure of the AJ Wright chain, but the store closed on January 14, 2012, after only 8 months in operation.
