= Hoopes-Cunningham Mansion =

Historic house in Illinois, United States

- U.S. National Register of Historic Places
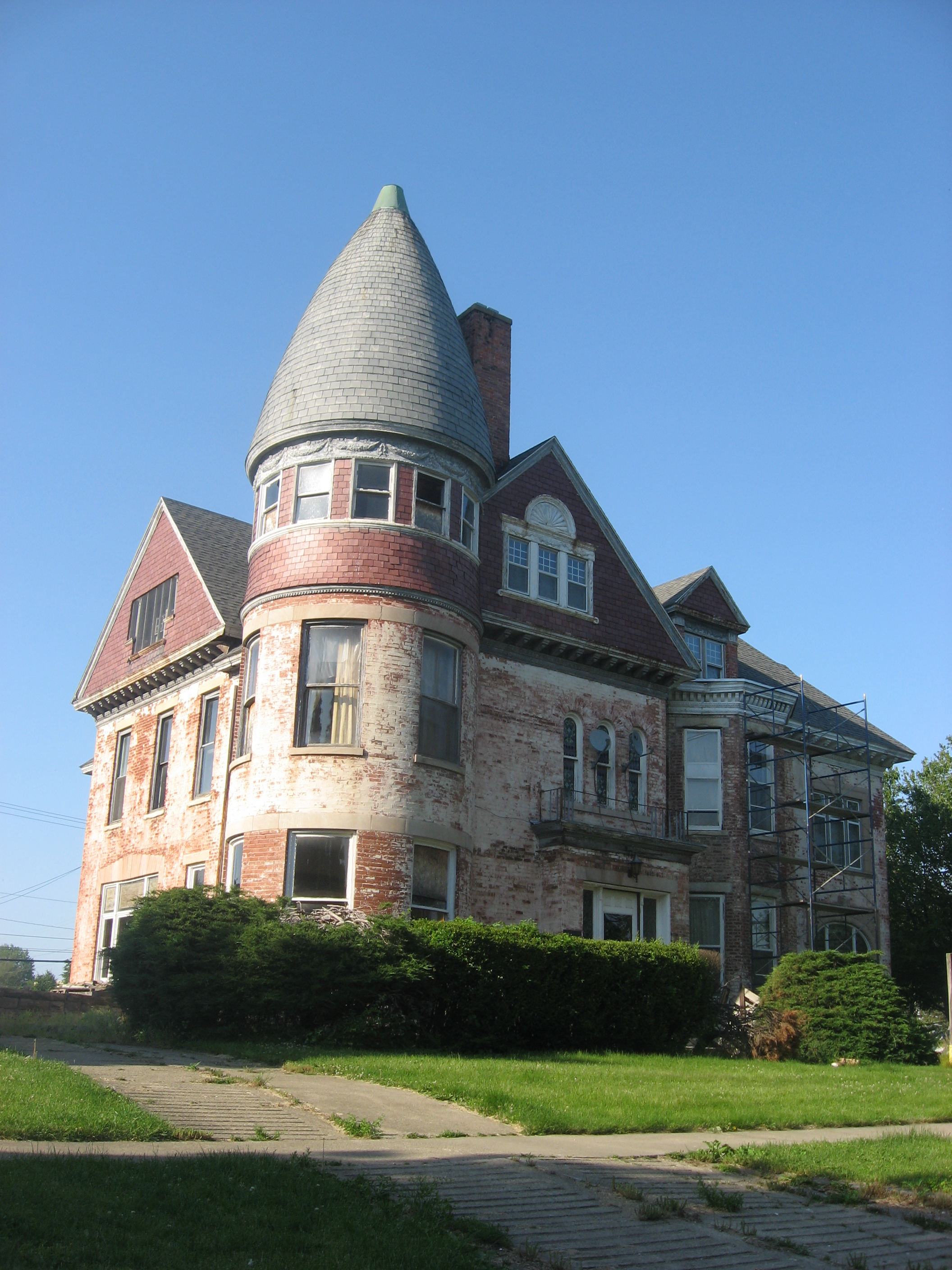

- Location within Illinois Location within the United States
- Location: 424 E. Penn St., Hoopeston, Illinois
- Coordinates: 40°27′59″N 87°39′56″W
- Area: 0.7 acres (0.28 ha)
- Built: 1879–80
- Architectural style: Queen Anne
- NRHP reference No.: 85002307
- Added to NRHP: September 11, 1985

The Hoopes-Cunningham Mansion is a historic home located at 424 E. Penn St. in Hoopeston, Illinois. The brick house was constructed in 1879–80 for Thomas Hoopes, the founder of Hoopeston, and was originally an Italianate building. In 1894, Hoopes' niece and her husband, James A. Cunningham, purchased the house. The couple remodeled the house in the Queen Anne style; the new design included a three-story turret, red shingles siding much of the third story, and decorative masonry or tin work around several sets of windows. While he lived in the house, James Cunningham served as Hoopeston's mayor and was a prominent local businessman.

The house was added to the National Register of Historic Places on September 11, 1985.
