= First Baptist Christian School (Illinois) =

IFB Christian school in Danville, Illinois, USA

Coordinates: 40.1451°N 87.6294°W

First Baptist Christian School is a private, Independent Baptist kindergarten, elementary school and Christian high school located at 1211 North Vermilion Street in Danville, Vermilion County, Illinois, United States. It is a member of the Illinois Association of Christian Schools and American Association of Christian Schools.

The school was founded in 1953 as an educational ministry of Danville's First Baptist Church. Its current divisions are elementary, which includes kindergarten through grade 6, and secondary, which includes grades 7 through 12. The school's stated mission is "to make the most of Jesus Christ through spiritual, academic, physical, and social development."

== Sex Abuse Scandals ==
As of August 1, 2023, First Baptist Christian School has now had 3 former staff members charged and plead guilty to sex crimes against children. The most recent and the only case to document abuse actually occurring onsite was 21-CF-703 in Vermilion County, IL. The defendant, Robert S. Lazzell, was previously a teacher for one year before becoming the principal. He was principal at First Baptist Christian School from 2000-2016 before leaving to take a job with Maranatha Baptist University in Watertown, WI.

Robert Lazzell plead guilty to one count of Criminal Sexual Assault (Class 1 felony) on August 1, 2023, and was sentenced to 12 years in prison, with a requirement that he serve at least 85% of that sentence. Prior to Lazzell's charges coming to light, First Baptist's former music pastor and Bible teacher, Roger VanRaden (2003-2013 on staff) was charged and plead guilty in Champaign, IL to sexually assaulting one of the members of the youth group at his new church job as youth pastor. He was sentenced to 15 years in prison. Prior to VanRaden's charges, a high school math, science, and Bible teacher named David Cornelius was charged in 2003 with sexually abusing a young child in his wife's daycare, as well as soliciting sexual favors from a high school student at his new school position with Schlarman High School (also in Danville). He pleaded guilty and was sentenced to 4 years of probation.
