= Building at 210–212 West North Street =

- Formerly listed on the U.S. National Register of Historic Places
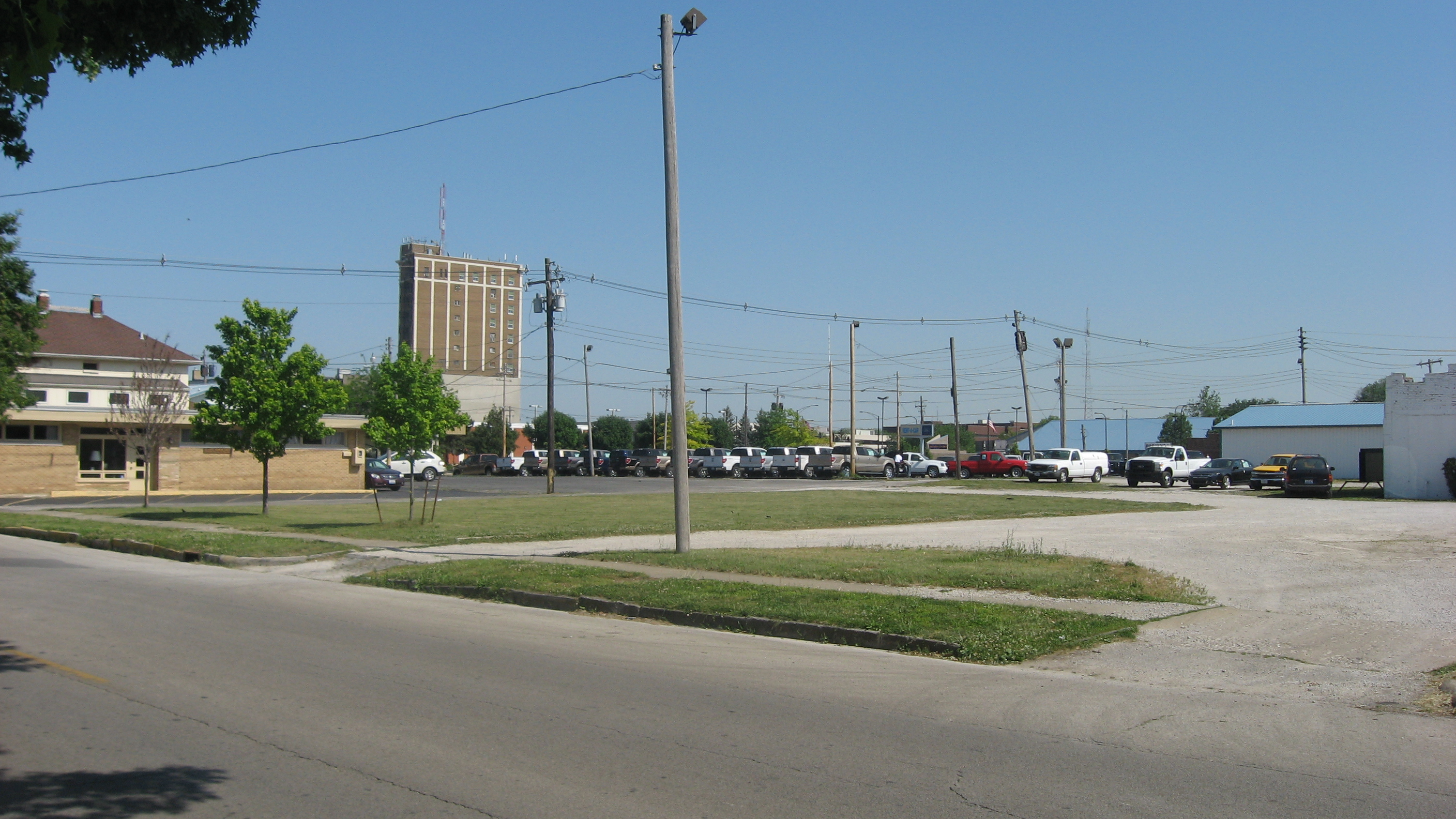
- The site of the building

- Location within Illinois Location within the United States
- Location: 210–212 West North St., Danville, Illinois
- Coordinates: 40°7′34″N 87°38′0″W
- Area: less than one acre
- Built: 1902
- Architectural style: Queen Anne
- NRHP reference No.: 00001334

Significant dates
- Added to NRHP: November 8, 2000
- Removed from NRHP: January 2, 2020

The Building at 210–212 West North Street was an apartment building located in Danville, Illinois. The two-story Queen Anne building was built in 1902. The building's front facade had four hexagonal window bays and an entrance between each pair of bays. Each entrance had a classical porch with Doric columns and an entablature. The window bays had a set of three windows on each story; the windows featured voussoirs and large keystones, and a stone belt course ran above the windows on each story. The roof had a large central pavilion with two dormers and two side pavilions with one each; the dormers were aligned with the four window bays.

The building was added to the National Register of Historic Places on November 8, 2000. It was demolished circa 2006, and was delisted in 2020.
