= United States Post Office and Court House (Danville, Illinois) =

- U.S. National Register of Historic Places
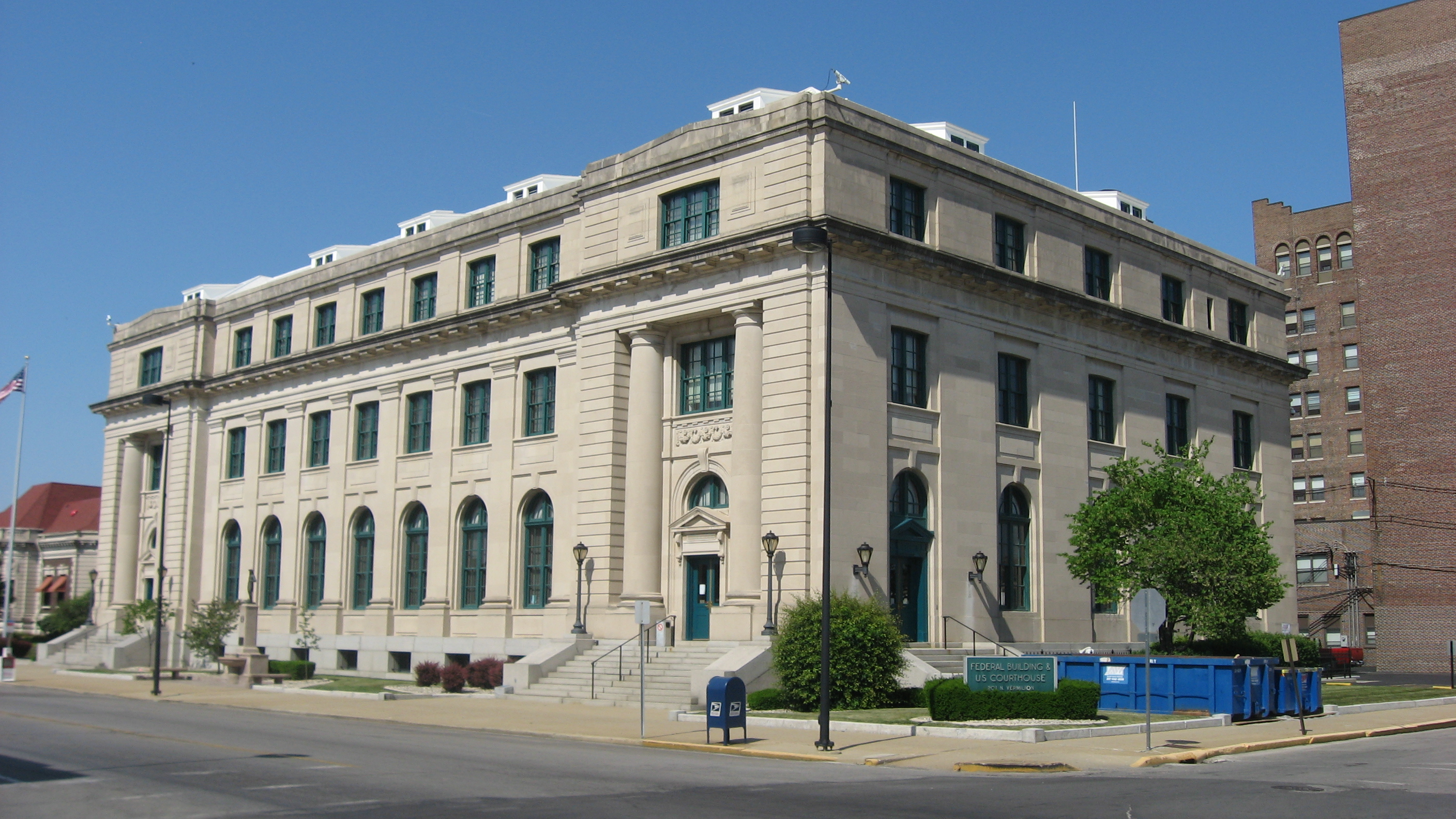

- Location within Illinois Location within the United States
- Location: 201 North Vermilion St., Danville, Illinois
- Coordinates: 40°7′39″N 87°37′47″W
- Area: less than one acre
- Built: 1911
- Architectural style: Renaissance Revival
- NRHP reference No.: 16000785
- Added to NRHP: November 22, 2016

The Vermilion County Administration Building, formerly known as the United States Post Office and Court House, is a historic federal building located at 201 North Vermilion Street in Danville, Illinois. The building was built in 1911 to serve as Danville's post office and a district courthouse for the Eastern District of Illinois. The building has a Renaissance Revival design, which was in keeping with Supervising Architect of the Treasury James Knox Taylor's preference for classically inspired styles. The limestone building's symmetrical front features a row of arched windows flanked by an entrance pavilion at each corner. A dentillated cornice circles the building above its second floor, and pediments along the roof top each entrance. The U-shaped interior of the building features wood and marble ornamentation and terrazzo floors.

Until 1988, the building housed the post office on its first floor and federal court operations on its upper two floors. After a new courthouse opened in Urbana, bankruptcy cases continued to be heard in Danville until 2013, when the building was mostly vacated.

In June 2017, the federal government transferred ownership to Vermilion County. The county clerk, auditor, treasurer, recorder and county administrative offices moved into the building in May 2018. The Vermilion County Board currently meets inside the former courtroom.

The building was added to the National Register of Historic Places on November 22, 2016.
