= Fithian, Illinois =

Fithian
- Village
- Village of Fithian
- Location of Fithian in Vermilion County, Illinois.

- Fithian's location in Vermilion County
- Coordinates: 40°06′52″N 87°52′30″W
- Country: United States
- State: Illinois
- County: Vermilion
- Township: Oakwood

Area
  - Total: 0.38 sq mi (0.99 km^{2})
  - Land: 0.38 sq mi (0.99 km^{2})
  - Water: 0 sq mi (0.00 km^{2})
- Elevation: 663 ft (202 m)

Population (2020)
  - Total: 488
  - Density: 1,275.3/sq mi (492.39/km^{2})
- Time zone: UTC-6 (Central (MST))
  - Summer (DST): UTC-5 (CDT)
- ZIP Code: 61844
- Area code: 217 447
- FIPS code: 17-26233
- GNIS ID: 2398881

Fithian is a village in Oakwood Township, Vermilion County, Illinois, United States. It is part of the Danville, Illinois Metropolitan Statistical Area. The population was 488 at the 2020 census.

== History ==
The town was named after Dr. William Fithian, who donated some of the land for the community; he came to Danville in 1830 and had a farm just a mile west of the site of the town of Fithian. He was a friend and supporter of Abraham Lincoln, who was reputed to have stayed at the farm often in the mid-19th century, as he traveled on his circuit prior to his presidency. Fithian served terms in the Illinois House and Senate. The town of Fithian was a center for trading livestock and grain; it thrived when the Illinois Traction System (an interurban railroad) went through in 1903, and declined along with the ITS, especially during the Great Depression.

== Geography ==
According to the 2010 census, Fithian has a total area of 0.38 square miles (0.98 km^{2}), all land.

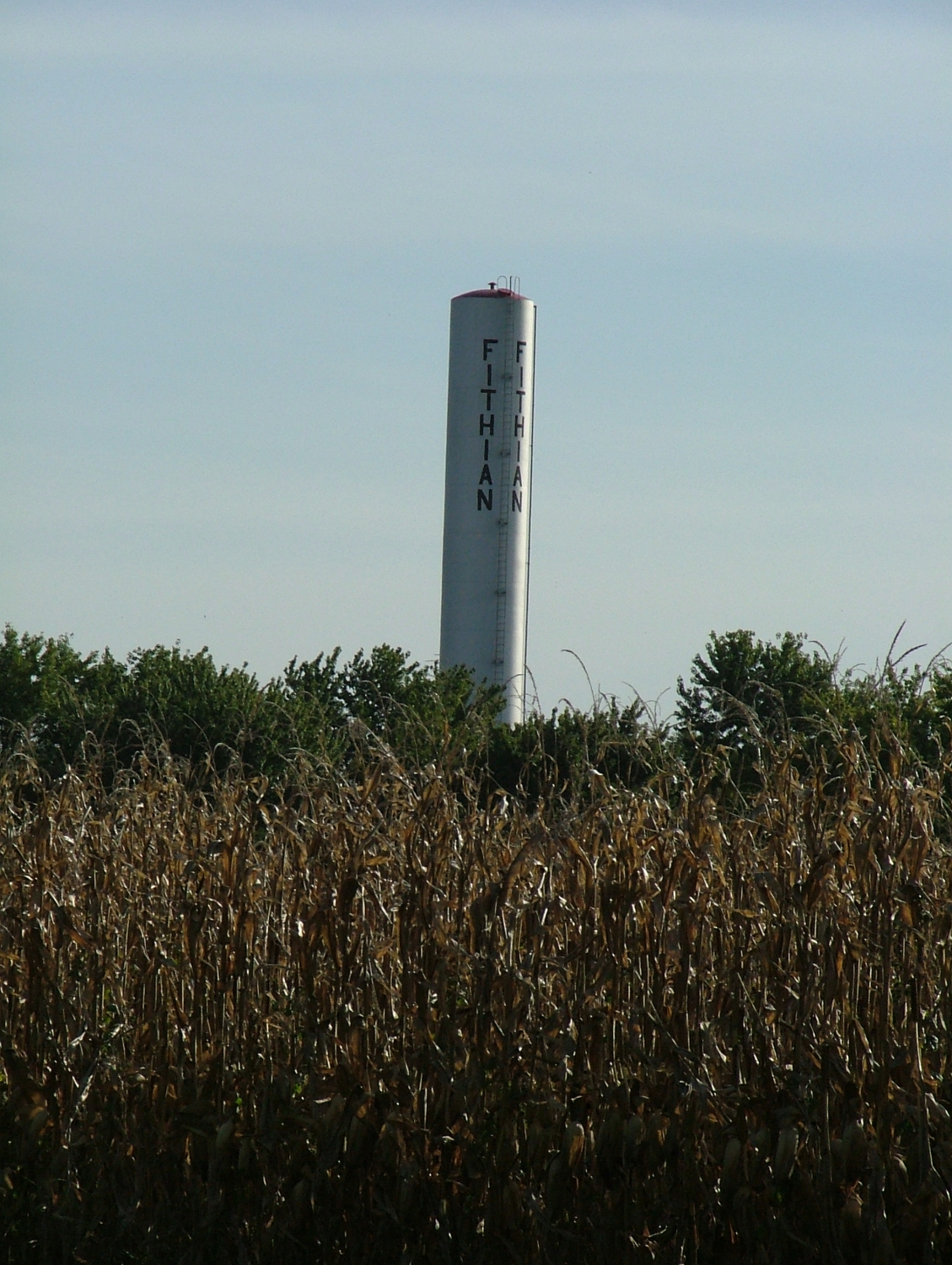
The Fithian water tower

== Demographics ==
Historical population
Census	Pop.	Note	%±
1880	165		—
1900	309		—
1910	386		24.9%
1920	482		24.9%
1930	461		−4.4%
1940	423		−8.2%
1950	414		−2.1%
1960	495		19.6%
1970	562		13.5%
1980	540		−3.9%
1990	512		−5.2%
2000	506		−1.2%
2010	485		−4.2%
2020	488		0.6%
U.S. Decennial Census

As of the 2000 Census, there were 506 people, 201 households and 147 families residing in the village. The population density was 1,308.9 inhabitants per square mile (505.4/km^{2}). There were 205 housing units at an average density of 530.3 per square mile (204.7/km^{2}). The racial makeup of the village was 99.41% White, 0.20% African American and 0.40% from two or more races. Hispanic or Latino of any race were 0.59% of the population.

There were 201 households, out of which 32.3% had children under the age of 18 living with them, 61.2% were married couples living together, 8.5% had a female householder with no husband present and 26.4% were non-families. 20.9% of all households were made up of individuals, and 11.4% had someone living alone, who was 65 years of age or older. The average household size was 2.52 and the average family size was 2.93.

In the village, the population was spread out, with 26.1% under the age of 18, 6.7% from 18 to 24, 34.2% from 25 to 44, 23.3% from 45 to 64 and 9.7% who were 65 years of age or older. The median age was 36 years. For every 100 females, there were 114.4 males. For every 100 females age 18 and over, there were 101.1 males.

The median income for a household in the village was $47,344 and the median income for a family was $47,500. Males had a median income of $32,411 versus $22,212 for the females. The per capita income for the village was $19,856. About 6.5% of families and 4.9% of the population were below the poverty line, including 8.8% of those under age 18 and 4.8% of those age 65 or over.

== Education ==
It is in the Oakwood Community Unit School District 76.

== See also ==
- List of towns and villages in Illinois
