= Holland Apartments =

- U.S. National Register of Historic Places
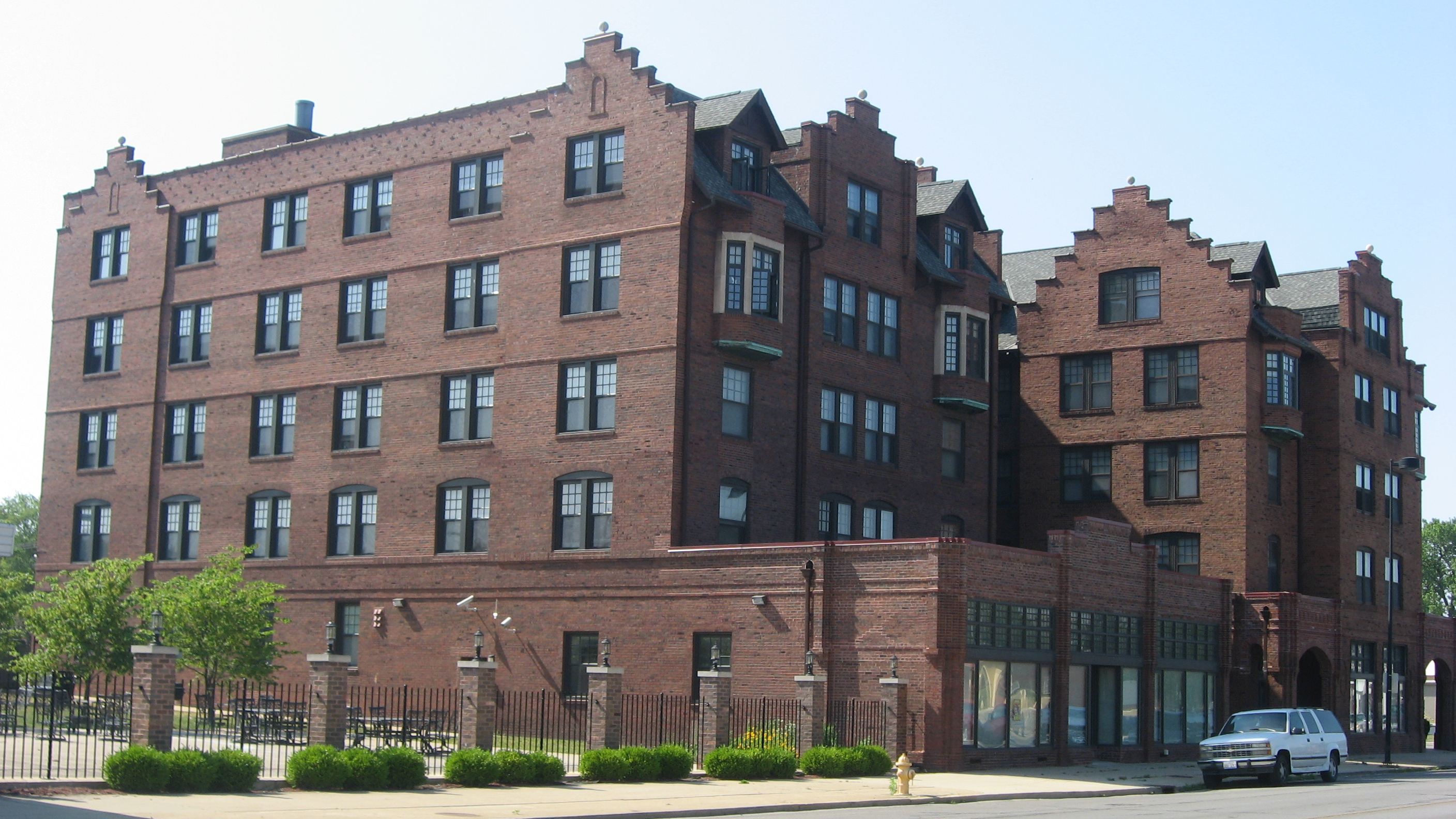
- Holland Apartments in 2012

- Location within Illinois Location within the United States
- Location: 324--326 N. Vermilion St., Danville, Illinois
- Coordinates: 40°7′48″N 87°37′49″W
- Area: less than one acre
- Built: 1906, 1927
- Architect: Lewis, Charles M.
- Architectural style: Dutch Revival
- NRHP reference No.: 88002232
- Added to NRHP: November 16, 1988

Holland Apartments is a historic apartment complex located at 324-326 N. Vermilion St. in Danville, Illinois. The building was constructed in two sections; the northern half was built in 1906, while the southern half was completed in 1927. Both sections of the building are designed in the Dutch Revival style; architect Charles M. Lewis developed the original design in 1906. The front and side facades each feature multiple stepped gables; the front-facing gables are flanked by dormers. The first floor, which originally housed four stores and a restaurant, features arched entrances, a brick parapet, and extensive corbelling. The Dutch Revival style is rare in the Midwest, and the building is the only Dutch Revival structure in the Danville or Champaign areas.

The building was added to the National Register of Historic Places on November 16, 1988.
