= Dale Building =

- U.S. National Register of Historic Places
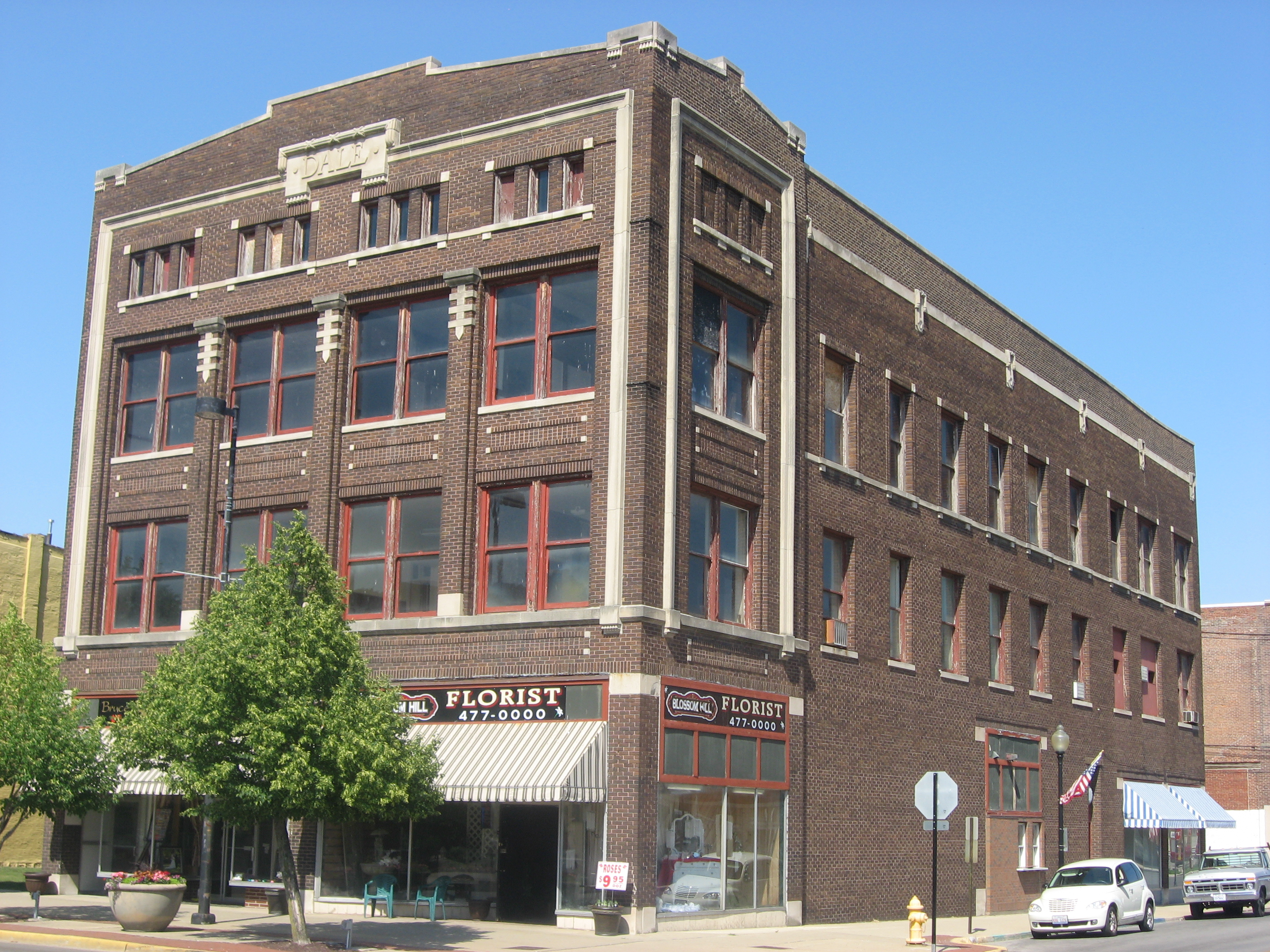

- Location within Illinois Location within the United States
- Location: 101-1-3 N. Vermillion St., Danville, Illinois
- Coordinates: 40°7′35″N 87°37′47″W
- Area: less than one acre
- Built: 1914
- Architectural style: Commercial
- NRHP reference No.: 99001711
- Added to NRHP: January 27, 2000

The Dale Building is a historic commercial office building located at 101-103 North Vermilion Street in Danville, Illinois.

== Description and history ==
While the building was constructed in 1873 as the Vermilion Opera House, it did not take its present form until 1914, when owner John Dale rebuilt it after it suffered severe fire damage. The reconstructed building was designed in the Commercial style, which was popular in Midwestern cities during the period. The three-story brick building uses stone for its ornamentation, providing contrast with the darker brick. The second and third floors of the front facade, as well as the attic windows, are surrounded by a stone border. Brick piers separate the four bays within the surround; arrow-shaped decorations top the piers. The building's name plate, located at the top of the surround, features a reeded torus molding and guttae along its bottom. A gabled parapet at the top of the front elevation hides the flat roof.

The building was added to the National Register of Historic Places on January 27, 2000.
