= Danville New Tech High =

Danville New Tech High School

Location
- 202 E. Fairchild; Danville, Illinois 61832; United States
- Coordinates: 40°8′15″N 87°37′37″W

Information
- School type: High School
- Motto: Trust, Respect, Responsibility
- Established: 2009
- Status: Active
- School district: District 118
- Principal: Jacob Bretz
- Staff: 189
- Grades: 9-12
- Enrollment: 240-250
- Average class size: 25
- Colours: Maroon and White
- Mascot: Viking
- Website: Danville New Tech High

Danville New Tech High School is a school located in Danville, Illinois. This school currently is only for sophomores and juniors. The school is part of the New Tech Network and implements only Project Based Learning teaching methods.

== New Tech origins ==
The New Tech program was started in Napa, California in 1996 as a result of the local business community working collaboratively with the school district.

== Campus ==
New Tech classes are different from other classes because they utilize project based learning. Students work in groups to solve authentic problems that require standards based content knowledge.

New Tech activity day was on the first day of school where every New Tech student had games to play and obstacles to go through in a group. The goal was to give students a glimpse of what they would be experiencing throughout the year.

== Advisory board ==
The Advisory Board is a group of students who act as liaisons between staff and students. The advisory board brings student concerns to the staff and also helps staff create and enforce school policy and procedures.
