= Fischer Theatre =

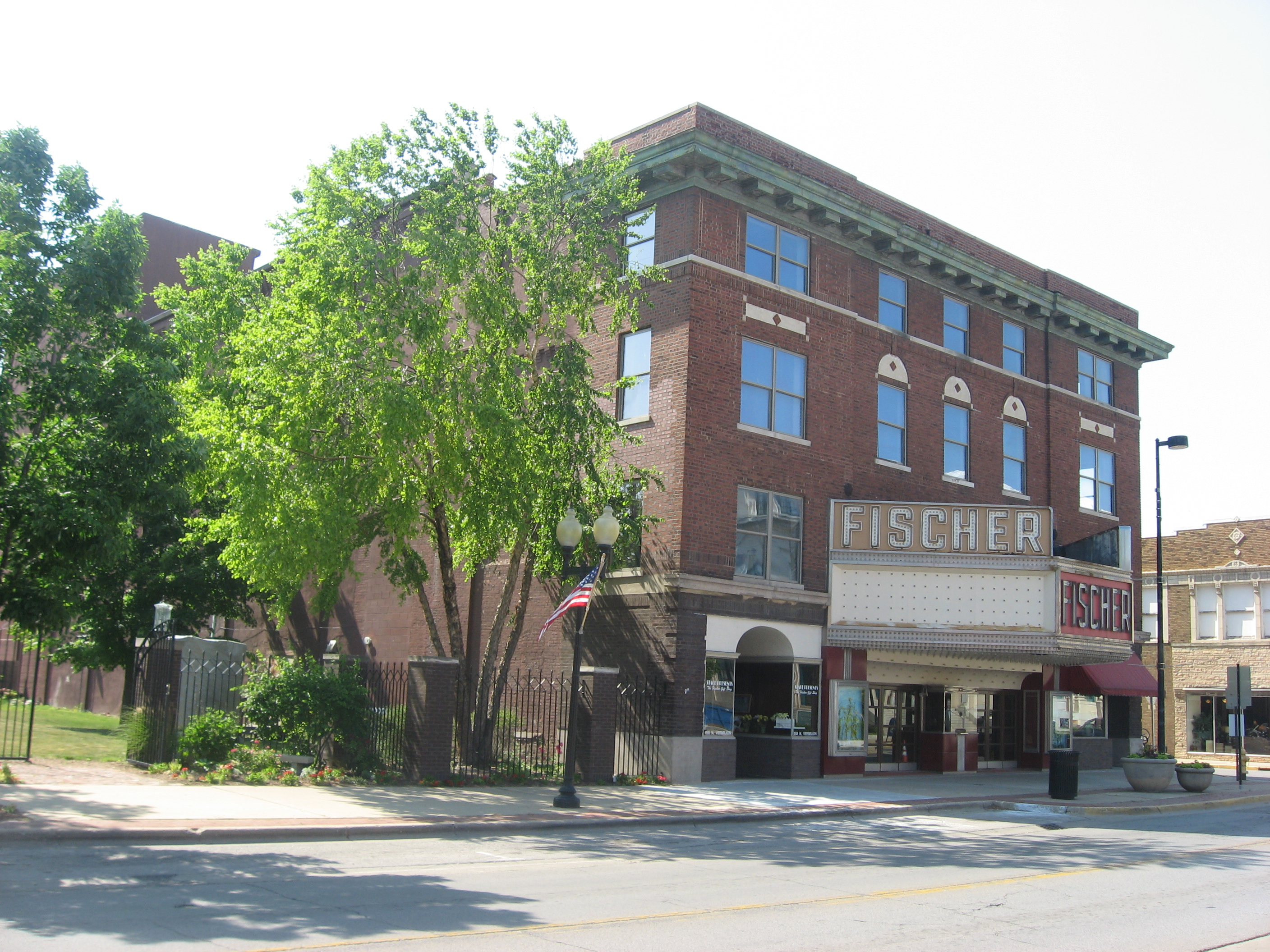
- Front of the theatre
- Interactive map of Fischer Theatre
- Address: 158-164 North Vermilion Street; Danville, Illinois; United States
- Coordinates: 40.12774°N 87.63030°W
- Owner: Vermilion Heritage Foundation

Construction
- Opened: April 1884
- Closed: January 5, 1982
- Reopened: 2019

Website
- https://www.fischertheatre.com

The Fischer Theatre was built in 1884 in Danville, Illinois, then known as the Grand Opera House. The grand opening was held on November 5, 1884. The lot on which it was built cost $6,000, and the building itself cost $28,000 including furnishings. In 1912, the theatre was remodeled and upon its reopening on March 13, 1913, it was known as the Fischer Theater, after a member of its governing board. In 1929, the theater added equipment to project movies, and the exterior was remodeled when apartments and commercial space were added to the front of the building. A large pipe organ was used to accompany silent movies. In 1971, the theater was sold to the Kerasotes Theatres chain. The original seating capacity was about 900, which included the main floor, mezzanine, balcony and boxes. New seating was installed in 1971 when it became a Kerasotes theatre, giving the main floor a capacity of 600.

In 1982, the Fischer Theatre was closed. Kerasotes Theatres removed and sold the building's fixtures, and the building was turned over to the city of Danville. In 1997, the building was deemed unsafe and slated for demolition, but in an attempt to save the building, Danville's Old Town Preservation Association convinced the city to turn the building over to the association. In 1998, the Old Town Preservation Association sold the building to the Vermilion Heritage Foundation. On June 20, 2006, the leadership of the Vermilion Heritage Foundation closed the theater to future events due to increasing utilities and maintenance costs and a desire to re-focus on fundraising for the complete restoration.

In August 2018, local philanthropist Julius W. Hegeler II became involved with the project and donated several million dollars for the renovation. The project began with a new roof and tuckpointing of the brick exterior, and was then expanded to include the interior of the building.

The Fischer Theatre is on the List of Registered Historic Places in Illinois.
