= Fithian House =

Historic house in Illinois, United States

- U.S. National Register of Historic Places
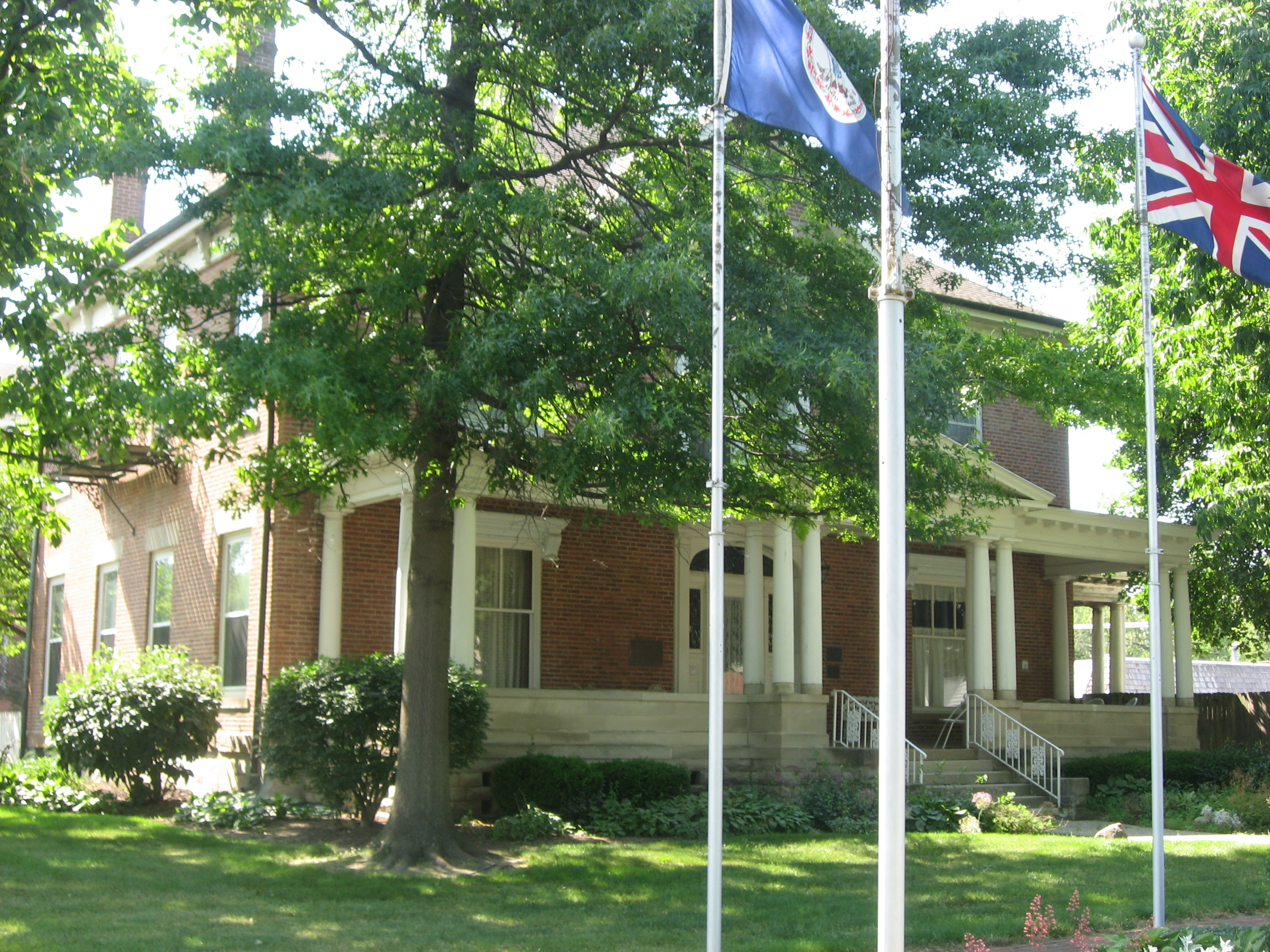

- Location within Illinois Location within the United States
- Interactive map showing the location of Fithian House
- Location: 116 N. Gilbert St., Danville, Illinois
- Coordinates: 40°7′39″N 87°38′10″W
- Area: 0.1 acres (0.040 ha)
- Built: 1855
- NRHP reference No.: 75002060
- Added to NRHP: May 1, 1975

The Fithian House is a historic house located at 116 N. Gilbert St. in Danville, Vermilion County Illinois. The Italianate house was built in 1855 for William Fithian. Fithian was a physician and a politician who served in the Illinois House of Representatives and Illinois Senate. In addition, Fithian donated land for and was the namesake of Fithian, Illinois, a Vermilion County village located west of Danville. Abraham Lincoln was a close friend of Fithian's, and while visiting Danville during his 1858 senatorial campaign, he stayed in the house and gave a speech from its second-floor balcony.

The house is now part of the Vermilion County Museum, a history museum which exhibits both the house's period interior and displays on local history and historical figures in a separate building.

The house was added to the National Register of Historic Places on May 1, 1975.
