= Slumberland Furniture =

American furniture retailer

- Type: Private
- Industry: Furniture
- Founded: 1967
- Headquarters: Oakdale, MN, 3505 High Point Drive North, Building 2 Oakdale, MN 55128, U.S.
- Number of locations: 122 stores (as of January 2024)
- Area served: Midwestern United States
- Key people: Kenny Larson (CEO and President)
- Revenue: US$ 262.95 million
- Number of employees: 1,000
- Website: Slumberland.com

Slumberland Furniture, Inc. is a family-owned furniture retailer in the Midwestern United States, founded in 1967.

== History ==
Slumberland Furniture is headquartered in Oakdale, MN.

Originally, the company specialized in mattresses and La-Z-Boy recliners. Today, Slumberland has 122 stores in 12 states. It is one of the United States' top sellers of La-Z-Boy upholstery and one of the top sellers of Sealy in the Midwest.
