= Danville, Illinois =

- City
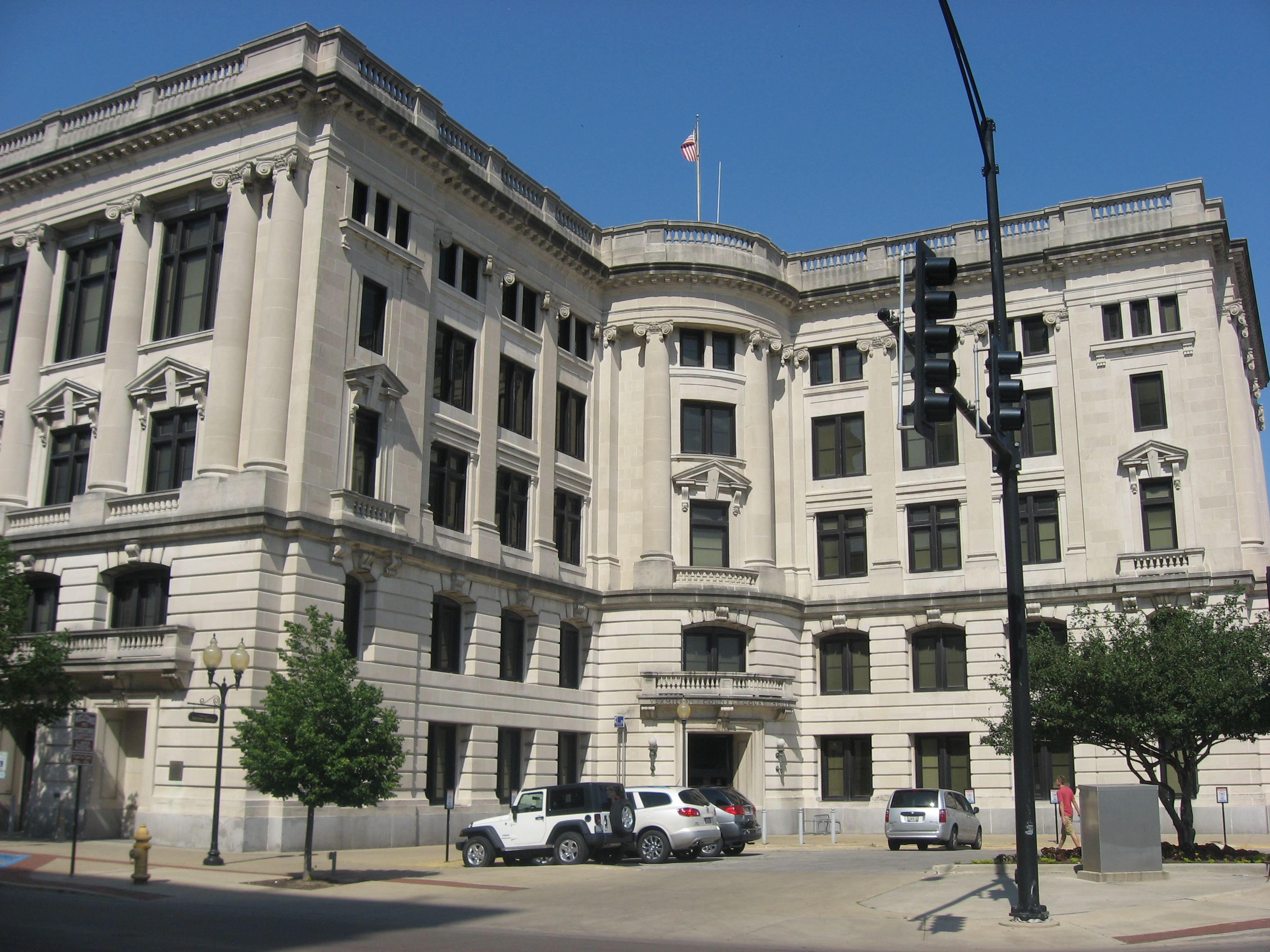
- Vermilion County Courthouse

- Seal
- Nickname: The Ville
- Motto: You Decide What's Possible.
- Interactive map of Danville, Illinois
- Location within Illinois Location within the United States
- Coordinates: 40°07′28″N 87°37′48″W
- Country: United States
- State: Illinois
- County: Vermilion
- Township: Blount, Danville, Newell
- Founded: April 10, 1827

Government
  - Mayor: Rickey Williams Jr.
  - Vice Mayor: Eve Ludwig

Area
  - City: 17.99 sq mi (46.59 km^{2})
  - Land: 17.86 sq mi (46.25 km^{2})
  - Water: 0.13 sq mi (0.34 km^{2})
- Elevation: 637 ft (194 m)

Population (2020)
  - City: 29,204
  - Density: 1,635.6/sq mi (631.49/km^{2})
  - Metro: 81,625
- ZIP code: 61832 and 61834
- Area codes: 217, 447
- FIPS code: 17-18563
- GNIS ID: 2393715
- Website: CityOfDanville.org

Danville is a city in Vermilion County, Illinois, United States, and its county seat. The population was 29,204 as of the 2020 census. It is the principal city of the Danville micropolitan area.

== History ==
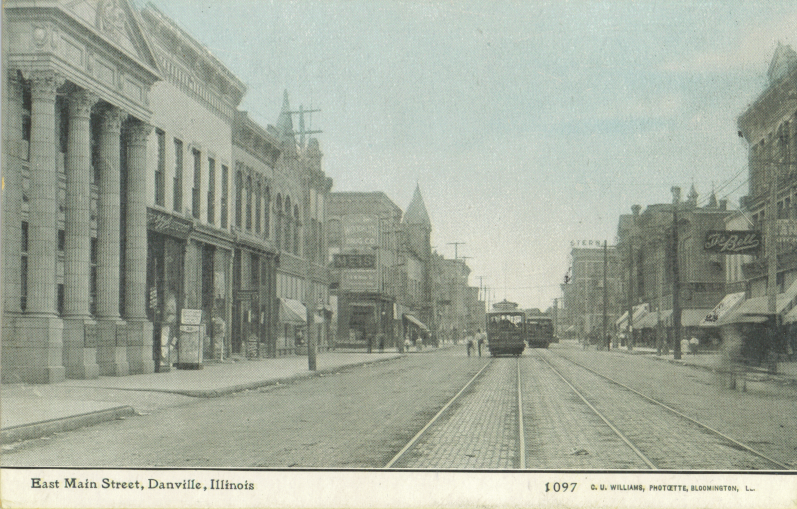
East Main Street circa 1910

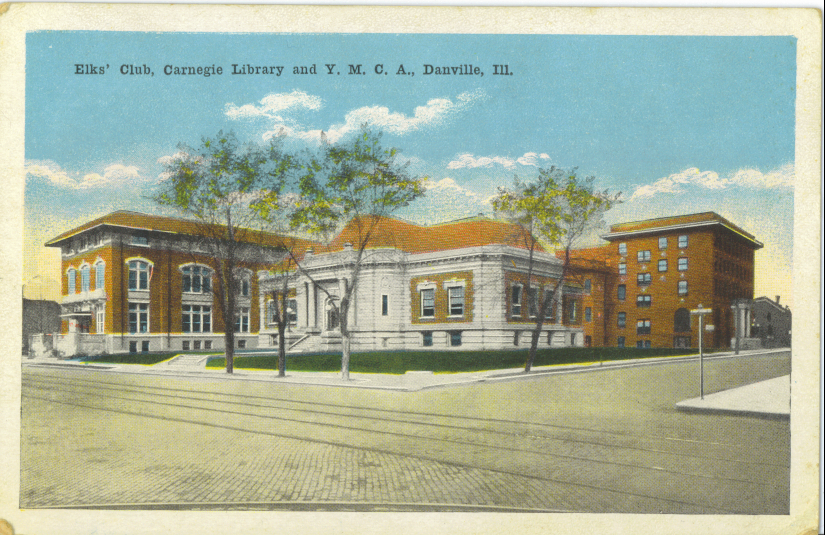
Elks' Club, YMCA, Carnegie Library (now museum) circa 1920

The area that became Danville was once home to the Miami, Kickapoo, and Potawatomi tribes of Native Americans. Danville was founded in 1827 on 60 acres (240,000 m^{2}) of land donated by Guy W. Smith and 20 acres (81,000 m^{2}) donated by Dan W. Beckwith. The sale of lots was set for April 10, 1827, and advertised in newspapers in Indianapolis, Indiana and the state capital of Vandalia. The first post office was established in May of the same year in the house of Amos Williams, organizer of Vermilion and Edgar Counties and a prominent Danville citizen. Williams and Beckwith drew up the first plat map; the city was named after Dan Beckwith at Williams' suggestion, although Beckwith suggested the names "Williamsburg" and "Williamstown". Beckwith was born in Pennsylvania in 1795 and moved to Indiana as a young man; in 1819 he accompanied the first white explorers to the area where Danville later existed because of his interest in the salt springs of the Vermilion River. He died in 1835 of pneumonia contracted on a horseback ride back from Washington; he was 40 years old.

In 1838 the Potawatomi Trail of Death camped and then passed through Danville. Four Potawatomi people died and were buried in Danville. In the mid-1800s Abraham Lincoln visited Danville over the course of approximately 18 years as he practiced law across the 8th Judicial Circuit. Danville was home to Ward Hill Lamon his law partner who later served as his bodyguard. Lincoln later gave a speech in his stocking feet from the balcony of Dr. William Fithian, a prominent Danville physician. The Fithian home is listed on the National Register of Historic Places and serves as the Vermilion County Museum. In 1882, a small group of Franciscan Sisters formed St. Elizabeth Hospital out of a 14-room hotel. In 1883 a horsecar based streetcar was established. In 1884 an opera house was constructed. In 1891 the streetcar system was converted to electric streetcars. This interurban streetcar network was substantial in communities south of Danville within the county, such as Catlin, Westville, Georgetown, and Ridgefarm.

Danville became a major industrial city in the late 19th and early twentieth centuries. Starting in the 1850s Danville was an important coal mining area; some of the first open pit mining techniques were practiced here. The coal formation underlying eastern Illinois and western Indiana is named the "Danville Member," after the area where it was first discovered. Danville also served as a significant manufacturing center during the early 1900s, and the city's population doubled between 1900 and 1920. During this time Danville also acted as a rail hub for both passenger and freight service. Danville was the site of a riot in 1903, which led to the lynching of a black man and an assault on the county jail.

The Danville Branch of the National Home for Disabled Volunteer Soldiers opened in 1898 and, by 1910, 4,257 veterans were at the branch. This branch was the eighth of ten branches founded by the National Home for Disabled Volunteer Soldiers (NHDVS), nationwide, between 1866 and 1929. The Soldiers' Home was a major center in-itself with its own passenger train service, streetcar line, mess hall, farms, livestock, lake, jail, hospital, bakery, laundry stables, stores, theater, chapel, mortuary, office buildings, power plant, print shop, shoemakers, tinsmiths, barber shop and fire department. The first Danville Public Library was formed out of various existing collections in 1883 and was replaced by a Carnegie library in 1904. In 1910, a group of 9 elephants escaped from a Ringling circus and ran through Danville before being recaptured.

An extension University of Illinois was created in Danville in 1946. The extension became an independent junior college in 1949. The college, later called Danville Area Community College, acquired several historic buildings from the Veterans Administration which were renovated throughout the 1960s for educational purposes. These acquisitions placed the college on a larger campus shared with the National Cemetery and modernized Veteran's Hospital. In the 1970s the enclosed Village Mall was constructed.

By 1966 only 6 mines remained in Vermilion County. With the closure of the mines and many factories, including a major General Motors plant, Danville's economic base suffered in the latter half of the 20th century and the population began to decline significantly. Many of the former mines were converted into lakes, creating fishing and recreation opportunities at parks such as Kickapoo State Recreation Area and Kennekuk Cove County Park. The 21st century has seen continued population decline but also major economic development initiatives including the restoration of the Fisher Theatre, expansion of major health care facilities, and the expansion of educational programs focused on job placement.

== Geography ==
Danville is located approximately 120 miles (190 km) south of Chicago, 35 miles (56 km) east of Champaign-Urbana, and 90 miles (140 km) west of Indianapolis, Indiana. Illinois Route 1, U.S. Route 136, and U.S. Route 150 intersect in Danville; Interstate 74 passes through the south end of town. The city lies on the Vermillion River, which is part of the Wabash River Valley. Lake Vermilion is located on the northwest side of town.

According to the 2010 census, Danville has a total area of 17.967 square miles (46.53 km^{2}), of which 17.89 square miles (46.33 km^{2}) (or 99.57%) is land and 0.077 square miles (0.20 km^{2}) (or 0.43%) is water.

=== Neighborhoods ===
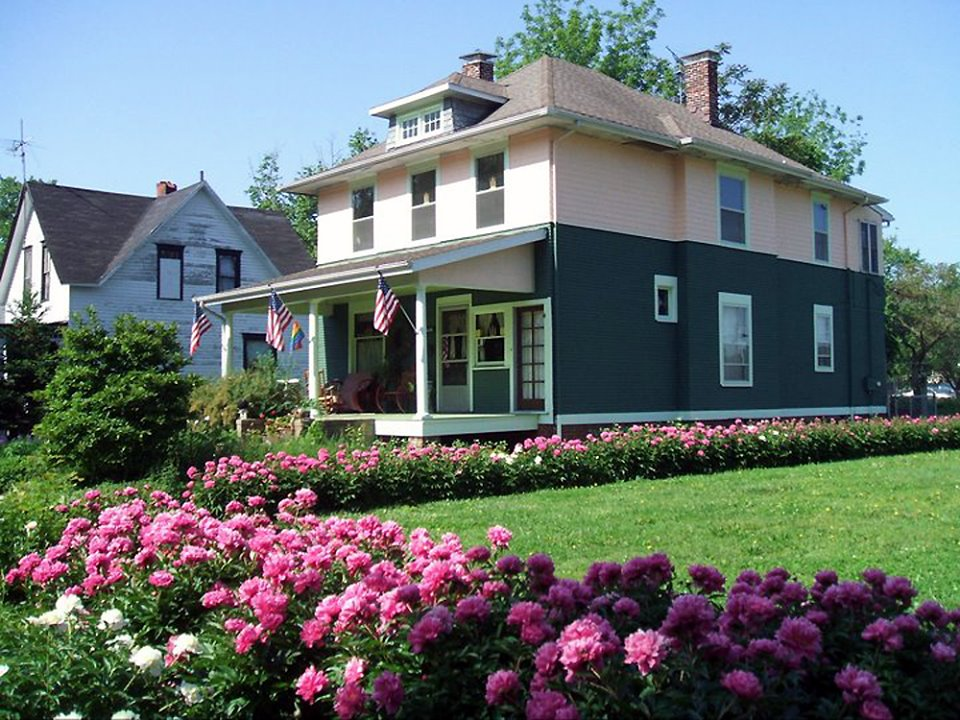
A home in the West Downtown Neighborhood

Danville is made up of many neighborhoods, of which 14 have or have had official neighborhood associations and 9 have official borders. The West Downtown neighborhood is one of the city's oldest, dating back to the later part of the 19th century. The neighborhood was home of the Renaissance Initiative Program created in 2000, which worked for the restoration and preservation of the neighborhood's historic assets. While the program officially disbanded in 2008, the West Downtown Neighborhood association continues these efforts. The Lincoln Park neighborhood is a locally designated historic district. Within the Lincoln Park neighborhood sits the 22-acre Lincoln Park, home of the also locally designed historic landmark the Lamon House. The Danville Neighborhood Leadership Council works to promote neighborhood associations, improve quality of life, and coordinate with City of Danville departments.

Danville is broadly divided into three districts. including the downtown district, the retail district, and the campus district. The downtown district consists of the historic core of the city, the retail district includes the northside retail corridor, and the campus district includes the Danville Area Community College (DACC) and VA campuses on the city's east side.

=== Climate ===
Danville, Illinois

Climate chart (precipitation, max. and min. temperature)
J	F	M	A	M	J	J	A	S	O	N	D
2.1 34 17	2 40 22	3.2 52 32	3.9 65 41	4.5 75 51	4.7 84 60	4.4 86 64	3.9 84 63	3 78 55	3 67 43	3.5 52 34	2.8 39 23
- █ Average max. and min. temperatures in °F
- █ Precipitation totals in inches
- Source: The Weather Channel
Metric conversion
J	F	M	A	M	J	J	A	S	O	N	D
52 1 −8	51 4 −6	81 11 0	98 18 5	114 24 11	119 29 16	112 30 18	100 29 17	77 26 13	77 19 6	90 11 1	71 4 −5
- █ Average max. and min. temperatures in °C
- █ Precipitation totals in mm

In recent years, average temperatures in Danville have ranged from a low of 17 °F (−8 °C) in January to a high of 86 °F (30 °C) in July, although a record low of −26 °F (−32 °C) was recorded in January 1994 and a record high of 112 °F (44 °C) was recorded in July 1936. Average monthly precipitation ranged from 1.99 inches (51 mm) inches in February to 4.70 inches (119 mm) inches in June.

Climate data for Danville, Illinois (1991–2020 normals, extremes 1895–present)
Month	Jan	Feb	Mar	Apr	May	Jun	Jul	Aug	Sep	Oct	Nov	Dec	Year
Record high °F (°C)	70 (21)	74 (23)	86 (30)	94 (34)	103 (39)	105 (41)	112 (44)	107 (42)	102 (39)	93 (34)	82 (28)	72 (22)	112 (44)
Mean daily maximum °F (°C)	35.3 (1.8)	40.4 (4.7)	52.0 (11.1)	65.2 (18.4)	75.3 (24.1)	83.1 (28.4)	85.4 (29.7)	83.9 (28.8)	78.9 (26.1)	66.5 (19.2)	51.9 (11.1)	39.9 (4.4)	63.1 (17.3)
Daily mean °F (°C)	27.4 (−2.6)	31.7 (−0.2)	42.1 (5.6)	53.7 (12.1)	63.8 (17.7)	72.2 (22.3)	75.1 (23.9)	73.5 (23.1)	67.3 (19.6)	55.4 (13.0)	42.8 (6.0)	32.4 (0.2)	53.1 (11.7)
Mean daily minimum °F (°C)	19.5 (−6.9)	22.9 (−5.1)	32.1 (0.1)	42.3 (5.7)	52.3 (11.3)	61.3 (16.3)	64.8 (18.2)	63.0 (17.2)	55.6 (13.1)	44.3 (6.8)	33.8 (1.0)	24.9 (−3.9)	43.1 (6.2)
Record low °F (°C)	−26 (−32)	−22 (−30)	−13 (−25)	12 (−11)	25 (−4)	36 (2)	41 (5)	37 (3)	22 (−6)	13 (−11)	−6 (−21)	−25 (−32)	−26 (−32)
Average precipitation inches (mm)	2.47 (63)	2.24 (57)	3.23 (82)	4.46 (113)	4.63 (118)	5.18 (132)	4.34 (110)	3.31 (84)	3.26 (83)	3.66 (93)	3.70 (94)	2.73 (69)	43.21 (1,098)
Average precipitation days (≥ 0.01 in)	10.6	8.9	11.1	12.1	13.1	11.6	10.2	8.6	8.5	9.9	10.3	10.8	125.7
Source: NOAA

== Demographics ==
Historical population
Census	Pop.	Note	%±
1840	503		—
1850	736		46.3%
1860	1,632		121.7%
1870	4,751		191.1%
1880	7,733		62.8%
1890	11,491		48.6%
1900	16,354		42.3%
1910	27,871		70.4%
1920	33,776		21.2%
1930	36,765		8.8%
1940	36,919		0.4%
1950	37,864		2.6%
1960	41,856		10.5%
1970	42,570		1.7%
1980	38,985		−8.4%
1990	33,828		−13.2%
2000	33,904		0.2%
2010	33,027		−2.6%
2020	29,204		−11.6%
U.S. Decennial Census

Danville is the principal city of the Danville Micropolitan Statistical Area, which encompasses all of Danville and Vermilion County.

=== Racial and ethnic composition ===
Danville city, Illinois – Racial and ethnic composition Note: the US Census treats Hispanic/Latino as an ethnic category. This table excludes Latinos from the racial categories and assigns them to a separate category. Hispanics/Latinos may be of any race.
Race / Ethnicity (NH = Non-Hispanic)	Pop 2000	Pop 2010	Pop 2020	% 2000	% 2010	% 2020
White alone (NH)	23,140	19,626	15,410	68.25%	59.42%	52.77%
Black or African American alone (NH)	8,193	9,808	9,610	24.17%	29.70%	32.91%
Native American or Alaska Native alone (NH)	61	71	46	0.18%	0.21%	0.16%
Asian alone (NH)	402	394	421	1.19%	1.19%	1.44%
Native Hawaiian or Pacific Islander alone (NH)	6	5	6	0.02%	0.02%	0.02%
Other race alone (NH)	58	42	126	0.17%	0.13%	0.43%
Mixed race or Multiracial (NH)	495	927	1,405	1.46%	2.81%	4.81%
Hispanic or Latino (any race)	1,549	2,154	2,180	4.57%	6.52%	7.46%
Total	33,904	33,027	29,204	100.00%	100.00%	100.00%

=== 2020 census ===
As of the 2020 census, Danville had a population of 29,204. The median age was 38.5 years. 24.1% of residents were under the age of 18 and 18.3% of residents were 65 years of age or older. For every 100 females there were 101.0 males, and for every 100 females age 18 and over there were 100.1 males age 18 and over.

99.9% of residents lived in urban areas, while 0.1% lived in rural areas.

There were 11,709 households in Danville, of which 29.0% had children under the age of 18 living in them. Of all households, 30.9% were married-couple households, 22.5% were households with a male householder and no spouse or partner present, and 39.0% were households with a female householder and no spouse or partner present. About 37.7% of all households were made up of individuals and 15.8% had someone living alone who was 65 years of age or older.

There were 13,484 housing units, of which 13.2% were vacant. The homeowner vacancy rate was 2.9% and the rental vacancy rate was 11.7%.

=== Income and poverty ===
The median income for a household in the city was $44,239 and the median income for a family was $59,930, and Married-couples families had a median income of $90,409. The per capita income for the city was $26,877. 25.1% of the population was determined to be living below the poverty line. Out of the total people living in poverty, 23.2% were between 18 and 64 years old.

=== Crime ===
In 2020, Danville was named one of the most dangerous cities in the country and the second most dangerous in the Midwest. The same study found Danville the 6th most dangerous metro area in the country and the most dangerous metro area in the state.

=== 2022 American Community Survey 5-year estimates ===
Racial Makeup of Danville (2022): 1. White alone (58.6%); 2. Black alone (33.1%); 3. Native American alone (0.08%); 4. Asian alone (1.33%); 5. Pacific Islander alone (0.03%); 6. Other race alone (1.73%); 7. Multiracial (5.15%)	Racial Makeup of Danville excluding Hispanics from Racial Categories (2022); NH=Non-Hispanic: 1. White alone NH (55.8%); 2. Black alone NH (33.0%); 3. Native American alone NH (0.08%); 4. Asian alone NH (1.33%); 5. Pacific Islander alone NH (0.03%); 6. Other race alone NH (0.00%); 7. Multiracial NH (1.77%); 8. Hispanic Any Race (8.01%)	Racial Makeup of Hispanics in Danville (2022): 1. White alone (35.7%); 2. Black alone (0.56%); 3. Native American alone (0.00%); 4. Asian alone (0.00%); 5. Pacific Islander alone (0.00%); 6. Other race alone (21.6%); 7. Multiracial (42.2%)

== Economy ==
Danville's main shopping center is the Village Mall, opened in 1975. Additional retail has spread north on Route 1 Vermilion Street since the early 90s, ranging from traditional big-box stores to retail infill and redevelopment of abandoned shopping centers. Retail in the community has increased after a large influx of redevelopment and green development, beginning in 2013 with the addition of Meijer and the Kohl's Plaza.

Portions of Danville are covered under the Illinois Enterprise Zone Program tax incentive program. Additionally, the City of Danville has created five Tax Increment Financing districts, including downtown, campus corridor, midtown, east Voorhees, and western gateway. Other available programs include a small business revolving loan fund and a downtown special service area (SSA). Economic development initiatives in the county, including in Danville, are covered by the organization Vermilion Advantage as well as Downtown Danville Inc, the City of Danville, and other partners.

The largest employment sectors in the Danville MSA are government (14.6%), employee of private company workers (67.6%), private not for profit (8.7%).

Following the legalization of Cannabis in Illinois, Danville's location near the Indiana state line made it an attractive location for a recreational cannabis dispensary (cannabis remains illegal in Indiana). Cresco Labs opened an adult-use dispensary under the Sunnyside brand in Danville in May 2020.

== Arts and culture ==
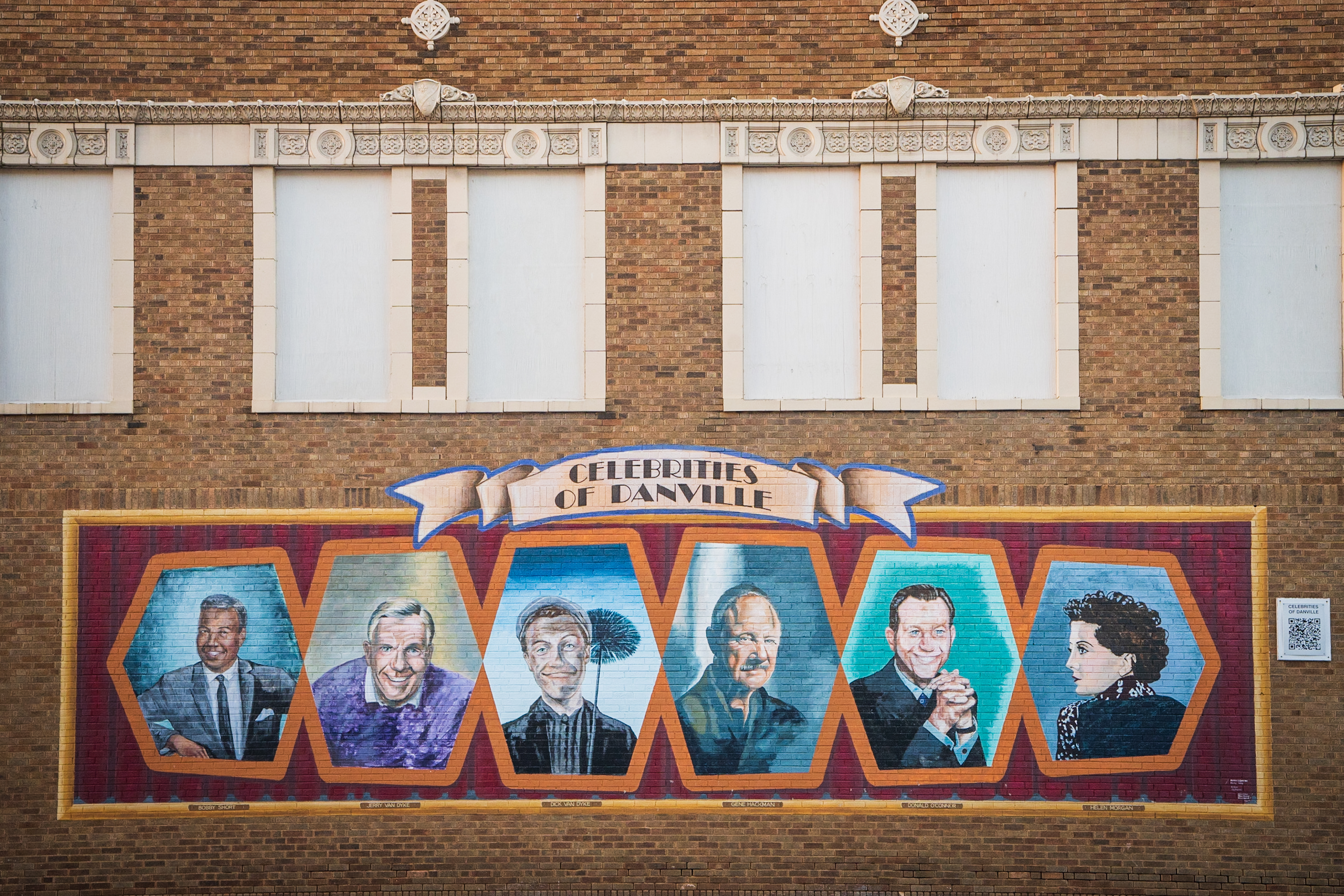
Walldog Mural of celebrities

=== Tourism ===
Tourism provides a significant economic impact to the Danville area. Danville is rich in Lincoln history, with over 12 sites commemorating his 18 years practicing law there while riding the 8th Judicial Circuit. Danville is a designated Looking for Lincoln gateway community and is home of three Looking for Lincoln wayside exhibits.

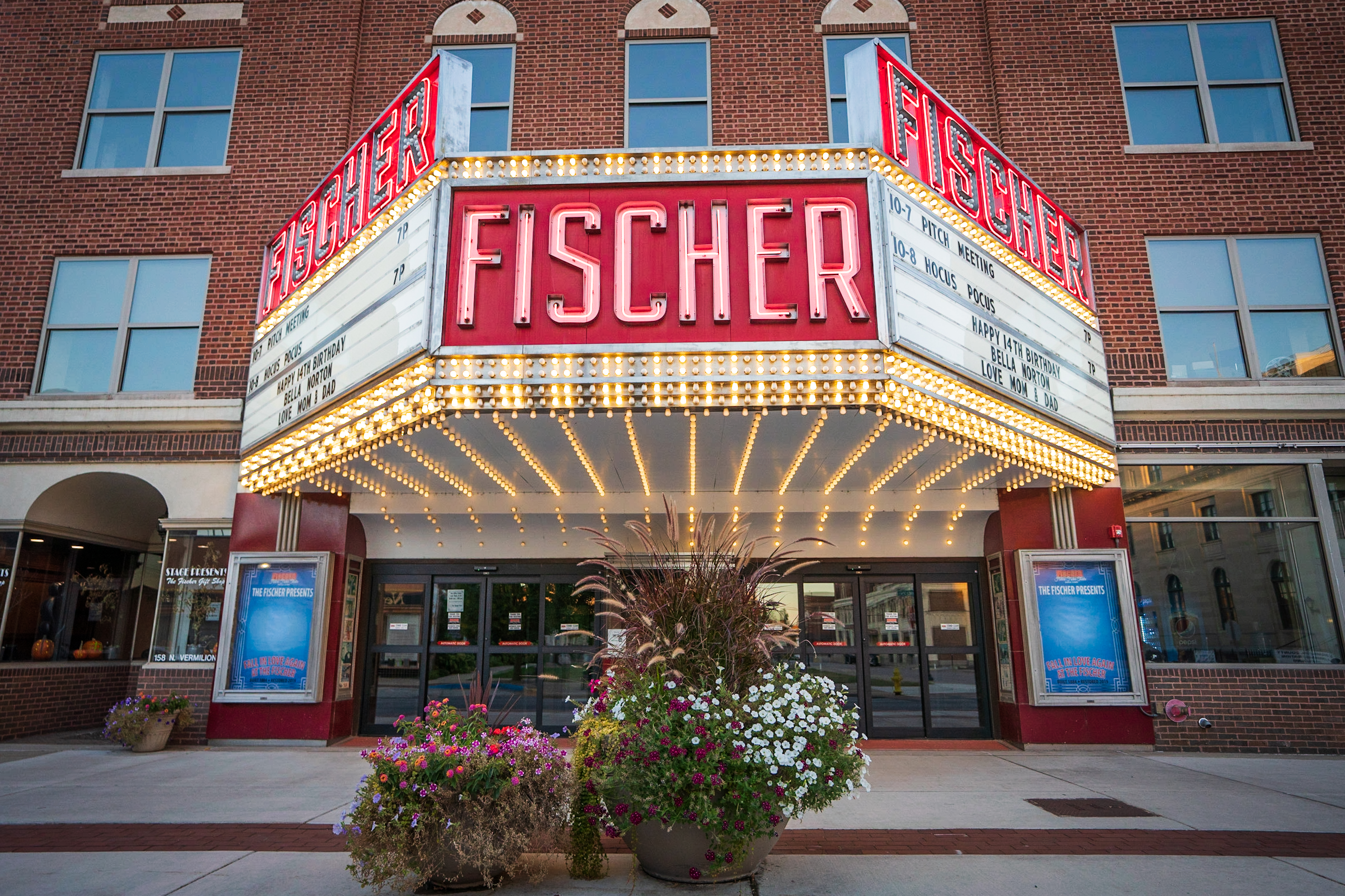
Fischer Theatre located in downtown Danville and listed on the National Register of Historic Places

Other tourist attractions include the historic downtown district, home of the Fischer Theatre, which includes a museum dedicated to the many famous performers who have lived in Danville, including Dick Van Dyke, Jerry Van Dyke, Donald O'Connor, Bobby Short, Gene Hackman, and Helen Morgan. The downtown area also includes the performance space Temple Plaza, Palmer Arena and ice rink, and 18 murals painted in 4 days by 160 Walldog artists from all over the world.

Danville is home to a number of noteworthy buildings and structures, including 10 places on the National Register of Historic Places and 21 places on the local registry. These notable places include a Carnegie library, now operating as the Vermilion County War Museum; the Fithian Home, where Abraham Lincoln gave a speech in 1858; and the Danville Branch, National Home for Disabled Volunteer Soldiers Historic District, currently located on the campus of DACC; the VA; and the Danville National Cemetery.

=== Events and festivals ===
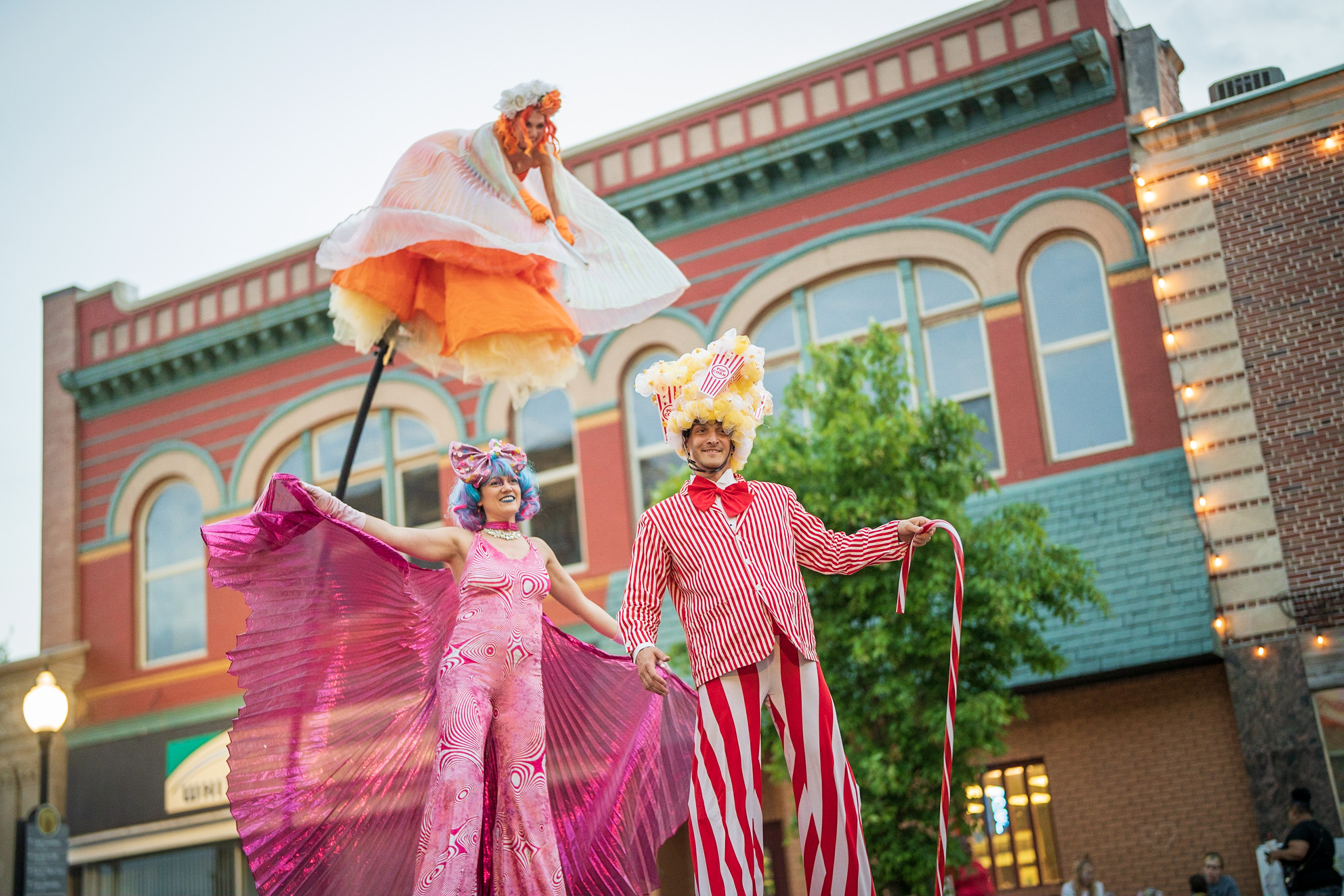
Stilt walkers from First Fridays Sweets in the Streets.

The City of Danville organizes First Fridays in Downtown Danville, a 12-month event series that are often free to low cost for the community to enjoy. July the city attracts hot air balloon enthusiasts from around the region for Balloons Over Vermilion, which takes place at the Vermilion Regional Airport, and a Splash-n-Dash flight over Lake Vermilion. In June regional artists descend on Danville for the annual Arts in the Park event in the historic Lincoln Park. Throughout the summer downtown's Temple Plaza hosts the Summer Sounds Concert Series. In the fall, the City host the Vermilion River Fall Festival at the historic Ellsworth Park. The area is home to many other events throughout the year, including parades, farmers' markets, sporting events, and festivals.

=== Cultural institutions ===
Danville is home to several significant cultural institutions and museums. Artistic institutions include the Danville Art League, headquartered in the west downtown neighborhood; the Danville Symphony Orchestra; the Danville Light Opera; the Dark Horse Theater Company; the Red Mask Players; and the DACC Players (from the Danville Area Community College). Performance venues include the historic Fischer Theatre, the Kathryn Randolph Theater, and the performance venues on DACC's campus. Museums in the city include the Vermilion County Museum, the Vermilion County War Museum, and the Fischer Arts & Entertainment Museum.

== Sports ==
Outside of high school and Danville Area Community College sports, Danville is home to one sports team. The Danville Dans are a summer collegiate wooden-bat baseball team that play in Danville Stadium. They were founded in 1989 as a member of the Central Illinois Collegiate League, which later merged with the Prospect League. The team has won nine championships, all of them coming in the CICL.

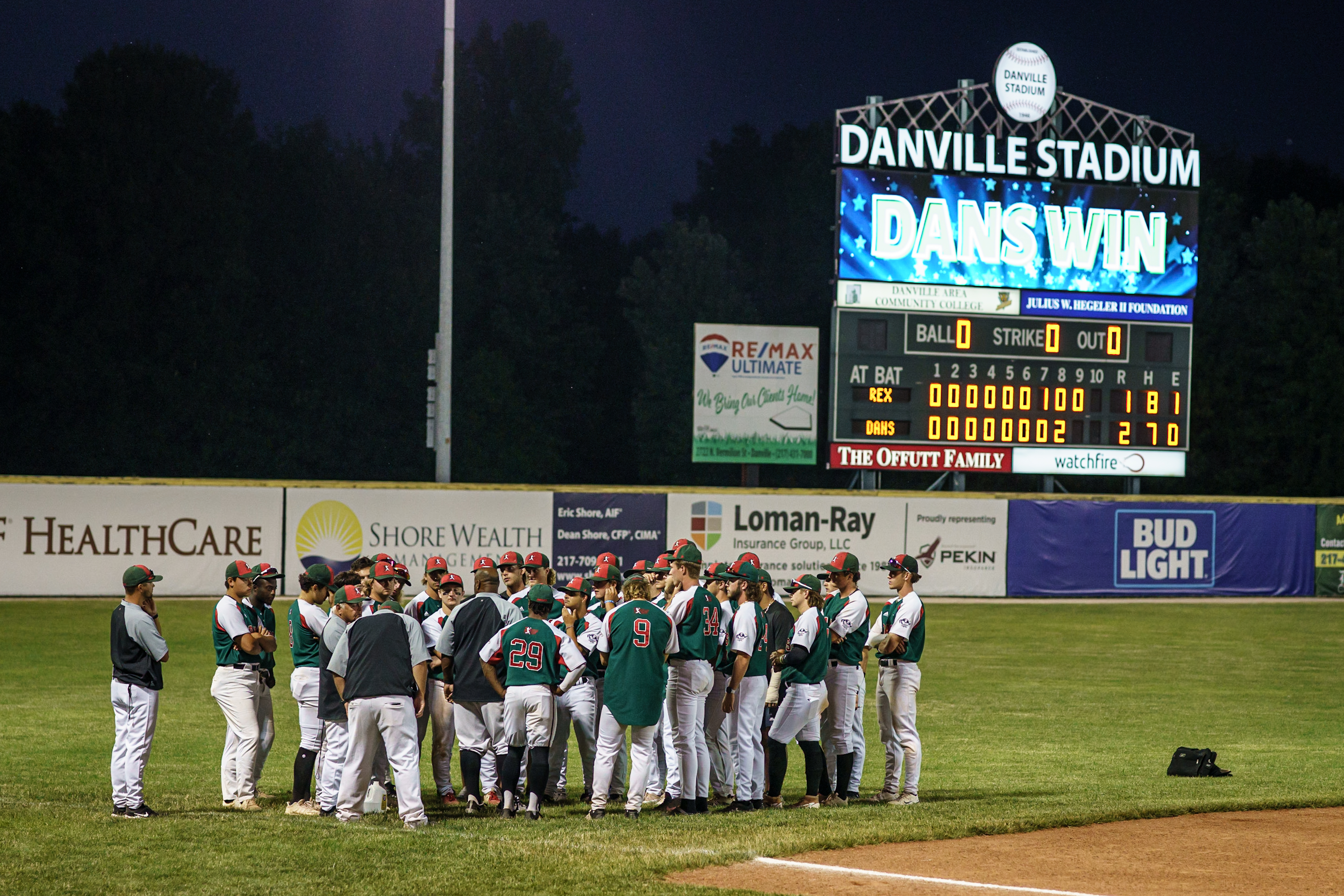
The Danville Dans at the Danville Dans Stadium

The Danville Dashers of the Federal Prospects Hockey League played at the David S. Palmer Arena from 2011 to 2020 and were named after the original tenants, the Danville Dashers. In 2021, the arena voted to replace the Dashers with a new team in the Southern Professional Hockey League called the Vermilion County Bobcats. The Bobcats folded during the 2022–23 season.

== Parks and recreation ==
The city of Danville maintains 20+ parks and recreation facilities, from small pocket parks to large regionally significant parklands. Danville's parks contribute to a county-wide collection that includes four county parks and three state parks. When combined with the city parkland, these total more than 15,000 acres, providing more acres of public park per capita than in any other county in Illinois.

Danville sits along the shore of Lake Vermilion, which is a 1,000-acre reservoir. The lake allows for fishing, bird watching, and unlimited-horsepower marine boating, jet-skiing, and waterskiing. Danville also sits along the Vermilion River, which provides recreational opportunities and supports abundant wildlife.

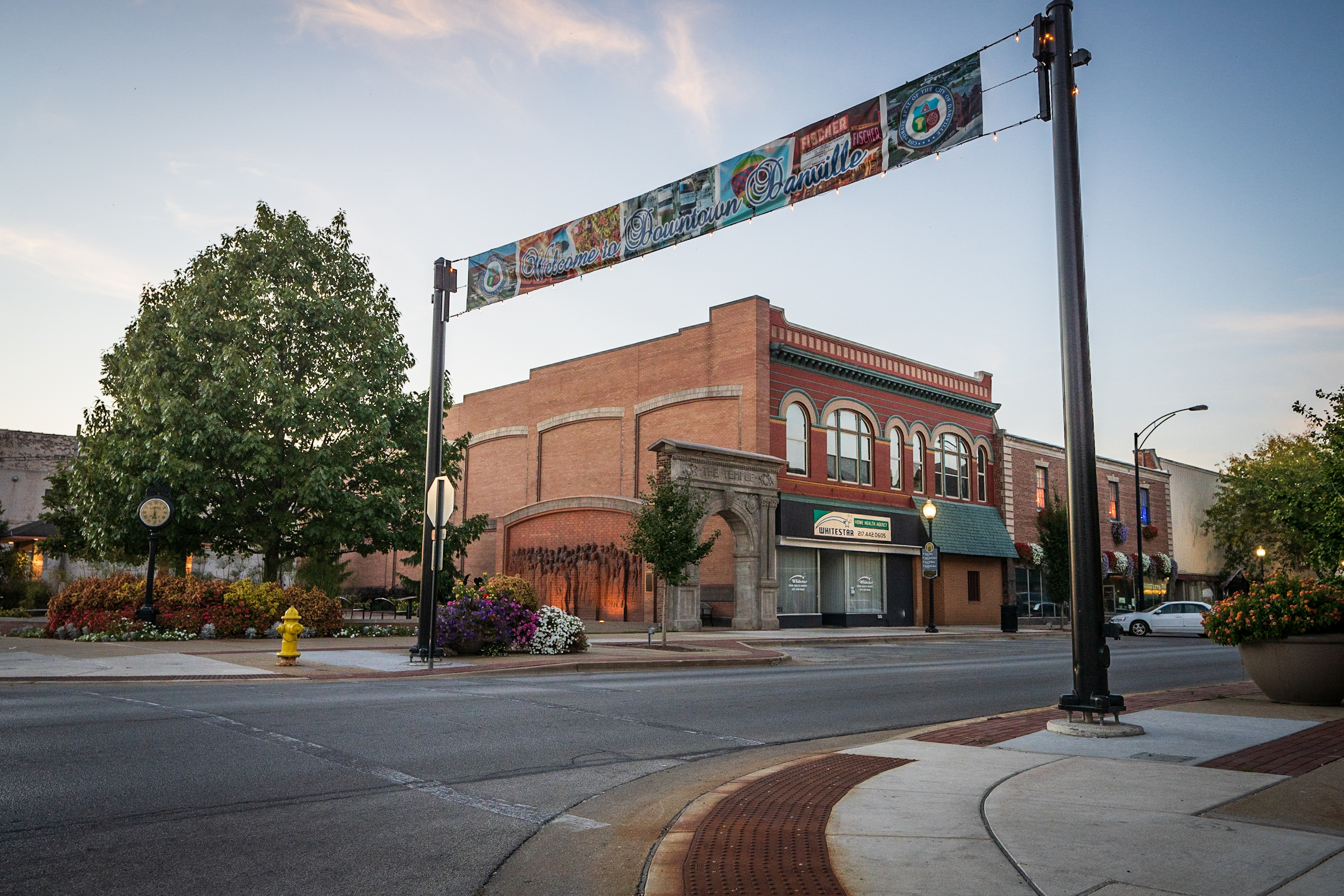
Temple Plaza in downtown Danville

There are several notable parks within the city, including Lincoln Park, home of mature trees, tennis courts, and the Abraham Lincoln–associated Lamon House (a Greek Revival cottage built in 1850 by Joseph and Melissa Beckwith Lamon). On the west side of the city, the North Fork of the Vermilion River winds through Harrison Park Golf Course, providing a backdrop for the 235-acre golf course and hiking destination. On the north side, the Heron County Park Wetlands Boardwalk extends into Lake Vermilion and includes a 950-foot handicapped-accessible floating boardwalk that weaves through the marshland. The park also contains a 30-foot observation tower, which often provides views of bald eagles and American egrets. on the West end of town is Ellsworth Park home to disc golf, park equipment, shelters, and walking paths.

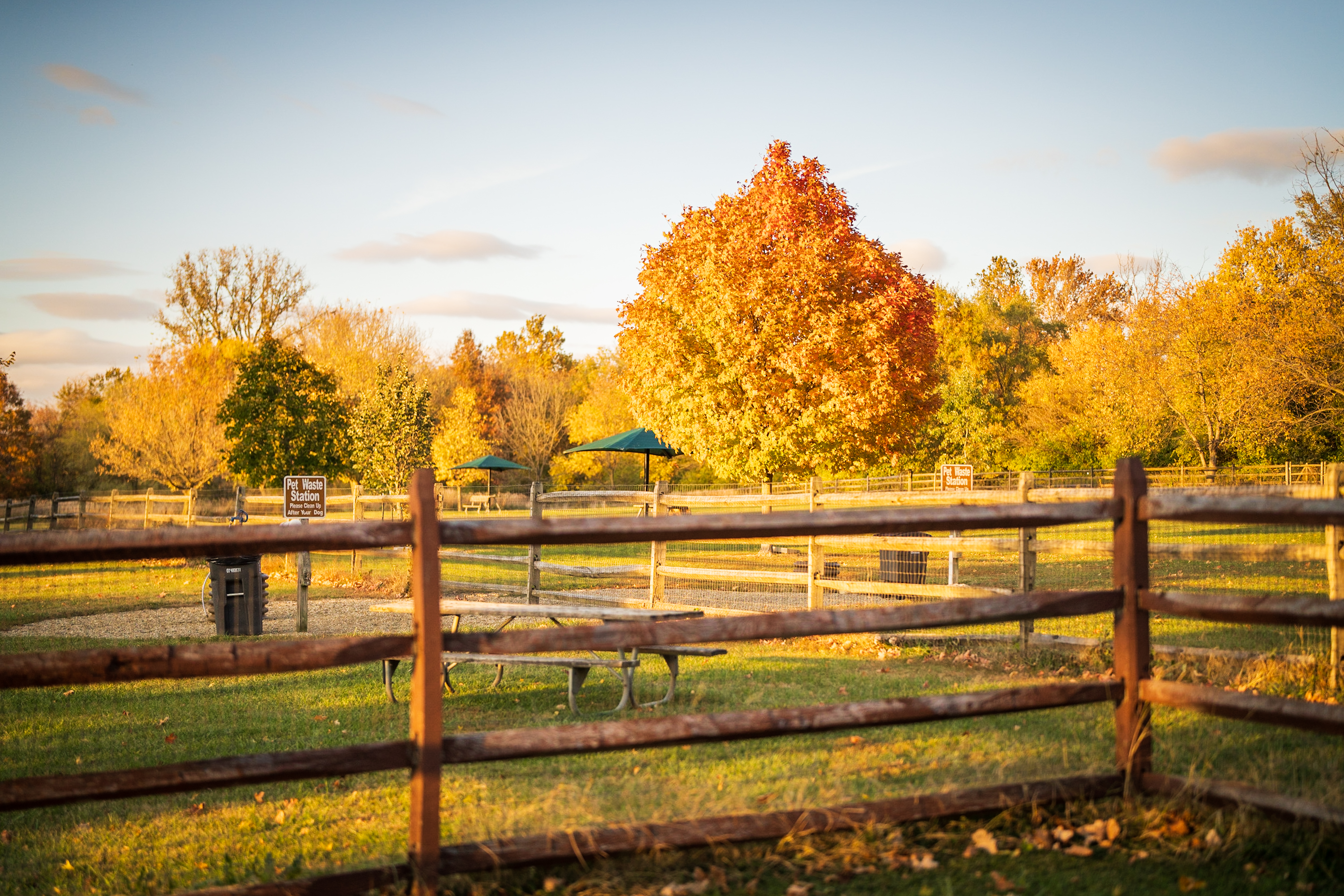
Espensheild Dog Park in the Fall

The downtown district contains five pocket parks, including Lindley Sign Forest and Temple Plaza. Temple Plaza hosts a number of community events throughout the year; including a summer concert series and a brick relief sculpture created by Texas-based artist Donna Dobberfuhl.

Additional recreational opportunities exist throughout the community, including Fetch Dog Park, the Danville Dans collegiate summer league baseball team, Garfield Park Aquatic Center, and many community sports leagues.

The city made national headlines with a Wall Street Journal article criticizing Danville and other municipalities nationwide for misappropriating COVID-19 funds. Out of the $26 million received from the federal government, Danville spent approximately half on a new water park.

== Government ==
=== Recent mayors ===
- 1967–1971: Al Gardner
- 1971–1975: Rolland E. Craig
- 1975–1985: David S. Palmer, namesake of David S. Palmer Arena
- 1985: Wilbur Scharlau, appointed acting mayor by city council following Palmer's death
- 1985–1986: Hardin W. Hawes, appointed acting mayor following Scharlau's resignation
- 1986–1987: Wilbur Scharlau, appointed mayor following resignation of Hawes
- 1987–2003: Robert E. Jones, namesake of Danville Municipal building
- 2003–2018: Scott Eisenhauer, namesake of Danville Public Works Building
- 2018–present: Rickey Williams Jr., appointed Acting Mayor by the city council, following Eisenhauer's resignation. Elected to full term on April 2, 2019. Defeated Former Vermilion County Board Chairman James McMahon, Alderman Steve Nichols, and Donald Crews.

== Education ==
=== Colleges ===
- Danville Area Community College
- Lakeview College of Nursing

=== Primary and secondary education ===
The majority of the municipality is within the Danville Community Consolidated School District 118. A small piece of Danville extends into the Bismarck-Henning Consolidated Unit School District.

Public secondary schools

- Danville High School
- Danville New Tech High
- Kenneth D. Bailey Academy
- North Ridge Middle School

Public elementary schools

- Cannon (demolished 2022)
  - There was a movement to preserve the school, but the Danville school district's board of trustees chose not to accept historical status that would be needed to preserve the building. In 2022 the board paid for a demolition firm to raze it.
- Edison
- Garfield
- Liberty
- Mark Denman (formerly known as East Park)
- Meade Park
- Northeast
- South View Upper Elementary (5th and 6th Grade, formerly known as South View Middle School)
- Southwest

The assigned high school of the Bismarck-Henning portion is Bismarck Henning High School.

Private schools

- Danville Christian Academy (PK-12)
- Schlarman Academy (K-12)
- First Baptist Christian School (K-12)
- Trinity Lutheran School (K-8)

== Transportation ==
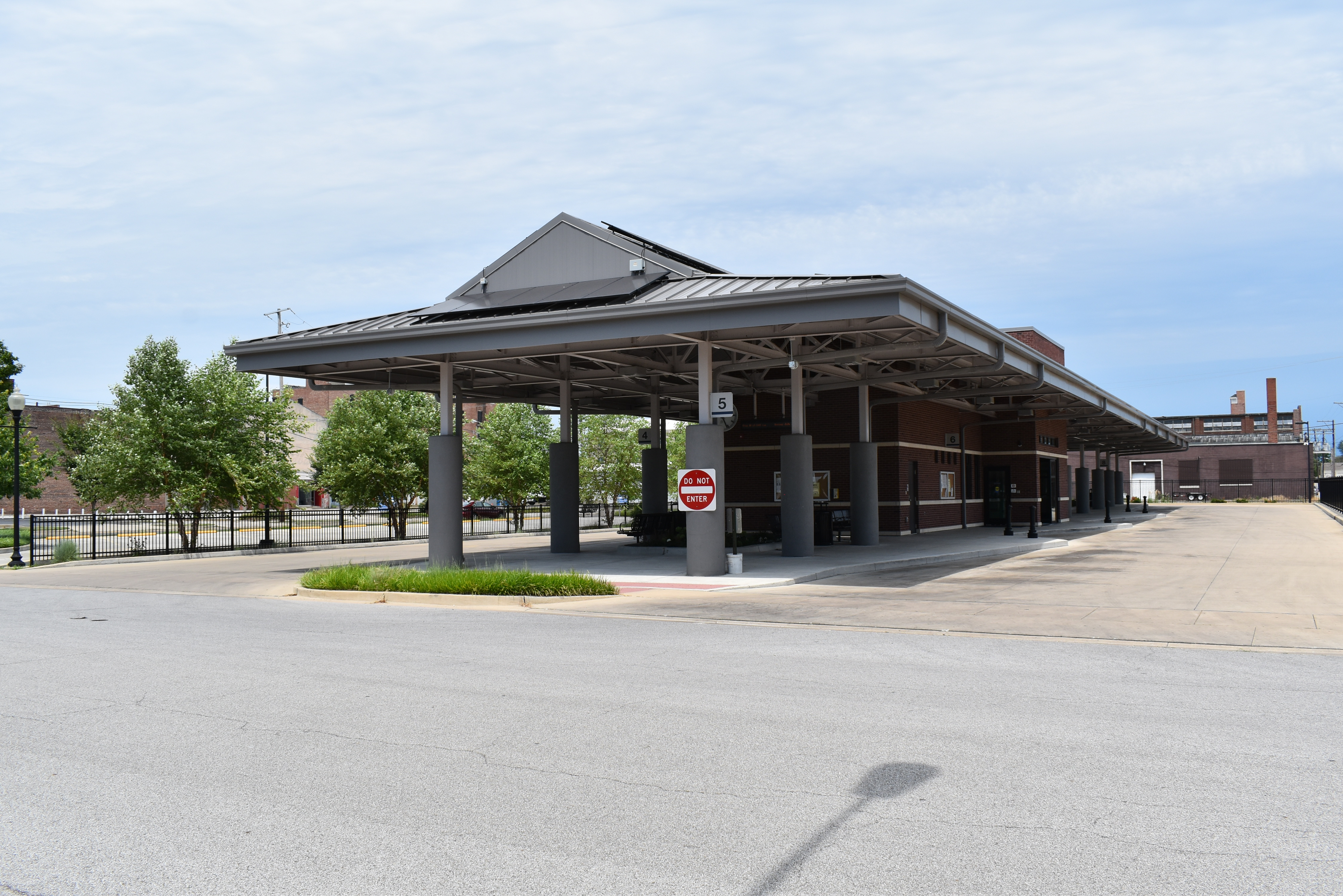
Richard L. Brazda Bus Terminal, Danville Mass Transit

The general aviation community is served by the Vermilion Regional Airport.

Danville is known as a major railroad intersection with at least four different tracks entering town from different directions, resulting in many crossings throughout the town. CSX Transportation, Norfolk Southern Railway, and Kankakee, Beaverville and Southern Railroad all operate rail lines that pass through Danville.

Danville Mass Transit (DMT) operates 14 fixed route buses in Danville and surrounding areas.

== See also ==
- List of photographs of Abraham Lincoln
