= Leo Traister =

American football and basketball coach (1919–2020)

Biographical details
- Born: September 9, 1919; Sterling, Illinois, U.S.
- Died: September 26, 2020 (aged 101); Eureka, Illinois, U.S.

Playing career

Football
- c. 1940: Eureka

Baseball
- c. 1940: Eureka

Track
- c. 1940: Eureka

Coaching career (HC unless noted)

Football
- 1948–1955: Viola/Winola HS (IL)
- 1956–1965: Eureka

Basketball
- 1948–1956: Viola/Winola HS (IL)
- 1957–1975: Eureka

Track and field
- 1948–1956: Viola/Winola HS (IL)

Administrative career (AD unless noted)
- 1956–?: Eureka

Head coaching record
- Overall: 11–55–6 (college football); 168–195 (college basketball)

Leo Owen "Doc" Traister (September 9, 1919 – September 26, 2020) was an American football and basketball coach. He was the head football coach at Eureka College in Eureka, Illinois for 11 seasons, from 1956 to 1965, compiling a record of 11–55–6. Traister was also the head basketball coach at Eureka for 17 seasons, from 1957 to 1974, tallying a mark of 168–195.

Traister was a World War II veteran. He stepped down at Eureka's head football coach after the 1965 season, and was succeeded by John Dooley.

Traister died on September 26, 2020, in Eureka.

== Head coaching record ==
=== College football ===
Year	Team	Overall	Conference	Standing	Bowl/playoffs
Eureka Red Devils (Prairie College Conference) (1956–1957)
1956	Eureka	1–6			
1957	Eureka	3–4			
Eureka Red Devils (NAIA independent) (1958–1961)
1958	Eureka	1–7			
1959	Eureka	0–5–3			
1960	Eureka	1–4–2			
1961	Eureka	3–2–1			
Eureka Red Devils (Gateway Conference) (1962–1966)
1962	Eureka	1–6	0–4	5th	
1963	Eureka	0–7	0–4	5th	
1964	Eureka	0–7	0–4	5th	
1965	Eureka	1–7	0–4	5th	
Eureka:		11–55–6			
Total:		11–55–6			
