= Daniel Sullivan (American football) =

American football player and coach

Current position
- Title: Head coach
- Team: Fayetteville–Manlius HS (NY)

Biographical details
- Born: Normal, Illinois, U.S.
- Education: Loras College (1997); Illinois State University (2001)

Playing career
- 1993–1996: Loras

Coaching career (HC unless noted)
- 1997: Loras (GA)
- 1998: Drake (LB)
- 1999: Lafayette (OLB)
- 2000–2001: Illinois Wesleyan (LB)
- 2002: Southwest Minnesota State (DL/LB)
- 2003–2004: Chicago (co-DC)
- 2005–2008: Eureka
- 2018–present: Fayetteville–Manlius HS (NY)

Head coaching record
- Overall: 5–30

Daniel Sullivan is an American football coach. He served as the head football coach at Eureka College in Eureka, Illinois from 2005 to 2008, compiling a record of 5–30. Sullivan resigned as head football coach at Eureka in October 2008. A graduate of University High School in Normal, Illinois, Sullivan played college football at Loras College in Dubuque, Iowa. He earned a master's degree in sports administration from Illinois State University in 2001. Sullivan spent two seasons as co-defensive coordinator at the University of Chicago before he was hired at Eureka.

== Head coaching record ==
Year	Team	Overall	Conference	Standing	Bowl/playoffs
Eureka Red Devils (Illini-Badger Football Conference) (2005–2007)
2005	Eureka	1–9	1–6	7th	
2006	Eureka	0–10	0–7	8th	
2007	Eureka	2–8	2–5	T–6th	
Eureka Red Devils (Saint Louis Intercollegiate Athletic Conference) (2008)
2008	Eureka	2–3	1–2		
Eureka:		5–30	4–20		
Total:		5–30			
