= Eugene L. Dersnah =

American sports coach and educator (1888–1938)

Biographical details
- Born: November 20, 1888; Farwell, Michigan, U.S.
- Died: May 3, 1938 (aged 49); Bay City, Michigan, U.S.

Playing career

Football
- 1907: Central Michigan
- Positions: End, quarterback

Coaching career (HC unless noted)

Football
- 1919: Washington HS (WI)
- 1920: Eureka

Basketball
- 1920–1921: Eureka

Baseball
- 1921: Eureka

Track and field
- 1920–1921: Eureka

Head coaching record
- Overall: 5–2–1 (college football)

Eugene Louis Dersnah Sr. (November 20, 1888 – May 3, 1938) was an American football, basketball, baseball, and track and field coach and educator. He served as the head football coach at Eureka College in Eureka, Illinois for one season, in 1920, compiling a record of 5–2–1.

Dersnah attended Central Michigan Normal School—now known as Central Michigan University—where he played football as an end and quarterback. He coached football at a high school in Stambaugh, Michigan and then at Washington High School in Milwaukee before he was hired at Eureka in 1920. Dersnah also coached basketball, baseball, and track and field at Eureka during the 1920–21 school year. He left Eureka in 1921 to head the athletic department at Eastern High School in Bay City, Michigan. He was succeeded at Eureka by Ralph McKinzie.

Dersnah later taught mathematics at Bay City Junior College. He died on May 3, 1938, in Bay City.

== Head coaching record ==
=== College football ===
Year	Team	Overall	Conference	Standing	Bowl/playoffs
Eureka Red Devils (Illinois Intercollegiate Athletic Conference) (1920)
1920	Eureka	5–2–1			
Eureka:		5–2–1			
Total:		5–2–1			
