= Paul LaVinn =

American football, basketball, and baseball coach

Biographical details
- Born: January 2, 1915
- Died: August 10, 1975 (aged 60)

Coaching career (HC unless noted)

Football
- 1941: Upper Iowa (assistant)
- 1945–1946: Carthage
- 1949–1951: Eureka

Basketball
- 1941–1945: Upper Iowa
- 1945–1948: Carthage
- 1948–1951: Eureka

Baseball
- 1947: Carthage

Head coaching record
- Overall: 6–27–2 (football); 93–103 (basketball); 2–7 (baseball)

Lincoln Paul LaVinn (January 2, 1915 – August 10, 1975) was an American football, basketball, and baseball coach.

== Coaching career ==
=== Carthage ===
LaVinn was the 12th head football coach at Carthage College in Carthage, Illinois, serving for two seasons, from 1945 to 1946, and compiling a record of 2–10–1. While at Carthage, LaVinn also coached the baseball team in 1947 to a 2–7 record, and found somewhat more success as the men's basketball coach for three seasons, from 1946 to 1948, with a record of 26–37.

=== Eureka ===
LaVinn was the seventh head football coach at Eureka College in Eureka, Illinois, serving for four seasons, from 1949 to 1951, and compiling record of 4–17–1.

LaVinn also coached the men's basketball team at Eureka for four seasons, from 1948 to 1952, tallying a mark of 44–38.

=== High school coaching ===
In August 1952, LaVinn was hired as the athletic director at Lockport Township High School in Lockport, Illinois. In additional to Lockport, he also coached at schools in Maple Park, and New Lenox.

== Later life and death ==
LaVinn moved in 1975 from Downer's Grove, Illinois to Largo, Florida. He died on August 10, 1975.

== Head coaching record ==
=== Football ===
Year	Team	Overall	Conference	Standing	Bowl/playoffs
Carthage Red Men (Independent) (1945)
1945	Carthage	2–3			
Carthage Red Men (College Conference of Illinois) (1946)
1946	Carthage	0–7–1	0–4	9th	
Carthage:		2–10–1	0–4		
Eureka Red Devils (Pioneer Conference) (1949)
1949	Eureka	1–7	1–2	T–2nd	
Eureka Red Devils (Independent) (1950–1951)
1950	Eureka	2–4–1			
1951	Eureka	1–6			
Eureka:		4–17–1	1–2		
Total:		6–27–2			
