= Matthew Smiley =

American football coach (born 1978)

Personal information
- Born: October 2, 1978 (age 48); Danville, Illinois, U.S.

Career information
- College: Illinois

Career history
- Dartmouth (2005) Assistant quarterbacks & specialists coach; Dartmouth (2006) Special teams coordinator; Eureka (2007-2008); Offensive coordinator (2007); Defensive coordinator & interim head coach (2008); Eastern Illinois (2009–2011) Running backs coach & special teams coordinator; Charleston Southern (2012) Running backs coach & special teams coordinator; Jacksonville Jaguars (2013–2016) Assistant special teams coordinator; Buffalo Bills (2017–2024); Assistant special teams coordinator (2017-2021); Special teams coordinator (2022-2024)

Head coaching record
- Career: NCAA: 2–2 (.500)

Matthew Smiley (born October 2, 1978) is an American football coach who most recently served as the special teams coordinator for the Buffalo Bills of the National Football League (NFL).

== Career ==
From 2013 to 2016, Smiley was the assistant special teams coordinator for the Jacksonville Jaguars.

Smiley joined the Bills in 2017 as assistant special teams coordinator when Sean McDermott was hired as head coach in 2017, and held that post for five years. During that time, kicker Tyler Bass scored 141 points in 2020 and 135 in 2021.

On February 9, 2025, the Bills parted ways with Smiley.

== Head coaching record ==
Year	Team	Overall	Conference	Standing	Bowl/playoffs
Eureka Red Devils (St. Louis Intercollegiate Athletic Conference) (2008)
2008	Eureka	2–2 (Note: Smiley was named interim head coach with four weeks remaining in the season following the firing of Daniel Sullivan.)	2–2	T–5th	
Eureka:		2–2	2–2		
Total:		2–2			
