= Kurt Barth =

American football player and coach (born 1976)

Current position
- Title: Washington Community HS (IL)
- Team: Assistant coach

Biographical details
- Born: August 2, 1975 (age 51); Minonk, Illinois, U.S.
- Education: Eureka College (1998); American College of Education (2010)

Playing career
- 1994–1997: Eureka
- 2000: Duluth-Superior Lumberjacks
- 2001: Peoria Pirates
- Position: Wide receiver

Coaching career (HC unless noted)
- 1998–1999: Eureka (GA)
- 2000–2002: Fieldcrest HS (IL) (DC/ST)
- 2003–2004: Eureka (OC)
- 2005–2008: Eureka HS (IL)
- 2009–2023: Eureka
- 2024–present: Washington Community HS (IL) (assistant)

Head coaching record
- Overall: 70–77 (college)
- Tournaments: 0–2 (NCAA D-III playoffs)

Accomplishments and honors

Championships
- 1 UMAC (2017); 1 NACC (2018)

Awards
- NCAA Division III All-American (1995–1997)

Kurt Barth (born August 2, 1975) is an American college football coach. He is an assistant coach for Washington Community High School, a position he has held since 2024. He was the head football coach for Eureka College from 2009 to 2023. He previously coached for Eureka High School and Fieldcrest High School. He played college football for Eureka as a wide receiver before playing professionally for the Duluth-Superior Lumberjacks of the Indoor Football League (IFL) and the Peoria Pirates of af2.

== Head coaching record ==
=== College ===
Year	Team	Overall	Conference	Standing	Bowl/playoffs
Eureka Red Devils (Upper Midwest Athletic Conference) (2009–2017)
2009	Eureka	4–6	1–2	3rd (South)	
2010	Eureka	2–8	2–5	7th	
2011	Eureka	4–6	4–5	6th	
2012	Eureka	4–6	3–5	5th	
2013	Eureka	8–2	7–2	3rd	
2014	Eureka	2–8	2–7	8th	
2015	Eureka	5–5	4–5	T–5th	
2016	Eureka	8–2	7–2	T–2nd	
2017	Eureka	8–3	8–1	1st	L NCAA Division III First Round
Eureka Red Devils (Northern Athletics Collegiate Conference) (2018–2023)
2018	Eureka	9–2	6–1	1st	L NCAA Division III First Round
2019	Eureka	6–4	4–3	3rd	
2020–21	Eureka	2–3	1–2	T–4th	
2021	Eureka	2–8	2–6	7th	
2022	Eureka	2–8	2–6	T–7th	
2023	Eureka	4–6	2–6	7th	
Eureka:		70–77	55–58		
Total:		70–77			
National championship Conference title Conference division title or championship game berth
