= Ray Urban =

American football coach

Biographical details
- Born: c. 1938

Coaching career (HC unless noted)
- 1963–1964: Illinois (backfeld)
- 1965–1968: Lincoln HS (IL) (line)
- 1969–1973: Eureka

Head coaching record
- Overall: 14–26–2

Raymond J. Urban (born c. 1938) is an American former football coach. He served as the head football coach at Eureka College in Eureka, Illinois for five seasons, from 1969 to 1973, compiling a record of 14–26–2.

Urban began coaching in 1955, while serving in the United States Marine Corps, at Twentynine Palms, California and Okinawa. He was a backfield coach at the University of Illinois from 1963 to 1964 under Pete Elliott. He then was the varsity football line coach at Lincoln High School in Lincoln, Illinois from 1965 to 1968. Urban earned a Master of Science degree in physical education from the University of Illinois. In addition to coacing, he was an assistant professor of physical education at Eureka before resigning in 1974.

== Head coaching record ==
Year	Team	Overall	Conference	Standing	Bowl/playoffs
Eureka Red Devils (Gateway Conference) (1969)
1969	Eureka	1–7	1–3	T–3rd	
Eureka Red Devils (NAIA Division II independent) (1970–1973)
1970	Eureka	5–3			
1971	Eureka	3–5–1			
1972	Eureka	2–5–1			
1973	Eureka	3–6			
Eureka:		14–26–2	1–3		
Total:		14–26–2			
