= Darrell Crouch =

American football coach

Biographical details
- Born: June 9, 1964 (age 62)
- Education: Illinois State University (1987)

Coaching career (HC unless noted)
- 1996–1999: Eureka (DC)
- 2000–2004: Eureka
- 2005–2023: Washington Community HS (IL)

Head coaching record
- Overall: 9–41 (college); 155–57 (high school)

Darrell Crouch (born June 9, 1964) is an American former college football coach. He was the head football coach for Eureka College from 2000 to 2004 and Washington Community High School from 2005 to 2023.

== Head coaching record ==
Year	Team	Overall	Conference	Standing	Bowl/playoffs
Eureka Red Devils (Illini–Badger Football Conference) (2000–2004)
2000	Eureka	2–8	1–6	7th	
2001	Eureka	1–9	1–6	T–7th	
2002	Eureka	2–8	2–5	6th	
2003	Eureka	1–9	1–6	8th	
2004	Eureka	3–7	2–5	6th	
Eureka:		9–41	7–28		
Total:		9–41			

=== High school ===
Year	Team	Overall	Conference	Standing	Bowl/playoffs
Washington Community Panthers (Mid-Illini Conference) (2005–2023)
2005	Washington Community	4–5	3–4	6th	
2006	Washington Community	2–7	1–6	7th	
2007	Washington Community	7–4	5–2	3rd	
2008	Washington Community	10–2	6–1	2nd	
2009	Washington Community	11–1	7–0	1st	
2010	Washington Community	6–4	5–2	2nd	
2011	Washington Community	10–3	6–1	2nd	
2012	Washington Community	9–3	5–2	2nd	
2013	Washington Community	12–1	7–0	1st	
2014	Washington Community	7–3	5–2	2nd	
2015	Washington Community	11–1	7–0	1st	
2016	Washington Community	9–3	6–1	1st	
2017	Washington Community	10–3	6–1	2nd	
2018	Washington Community	11–1	7–0	1st	
2019	Washington Community	6–5	5–2	3rd	
2020	Washington Community	5–1	5–1	1st	
2021	Washington Community	8–4	5–2	3rd	
2022	Washington Community	6–4	6–1	2nd	
2023	Washington Community	11–2	7–0	1st	
Washington Community:		155–57	104–28		
Total:		155–57			
National championship Conference title Conference division title or championship game berth
