= Tom Hosier =

American football coach (1942–2015)

Biographical details
- Born: September 15, 1942; South Haven, Michigan, U.S.
- Died: October 28, 2015 (aged 73); Rochester, Minnesota, U.S.

Coaching career (HC unless noted)
- 1967: Michigan (GA)
- 1968–1970: Bemidji State (assistant)
- 1971–1973: Gustavus Adolphus (OC/OL)
- 1974–1978: Eureka
- 1979–1989: Macalester
- 1990–1995: Winona State
- 2001–2003: Rochester C&T

Head coaching record
- Overall: 88–124–4 (college); 30–6 (junior college)
- Bowls: 0–3 (junior college)
- Tournaments: 0–1 (NAIA Division I playoffs); 5–1 (MCCC playoffs)

Accomplishments and honors

Championships
- 2 NSIC (1993–1994); 2 MCCC (2002–2003); 3 MCCC Southern Division (2001–2003)

Awards
- IBFC Coach of the Year (1976); NSIC Coach of the Year (1993)

Thomas E. Hosier (September 15, 1942 – October 28, 2015) was an American college football coach. He served as the head football coach at Eureka College in Eureka, Illinois from 1974 to 1978, Macalester College in Saint Paul, Minnesota from 1979 to 1989, and Winona State University in Winona, Minnesota from 1990 to 1995, compiling a career head coaching record of 88–124–4.

Hosier died on October 28, 2015, after a brief illness.

== Head coaching record ==
=== College ===
Year	Team	Overall	Conference	Standing	Bowl/playoffs
Eureka Red Devils (NAIA Division II independent) (1974–1975)
1974	Eureka	3–6			
1975	Eureka	3–5–1			
Eureka Red Devils (Illini–Badger Football Conference) (1976–1978)
1976	Eureka	6–3	3–1	2nd	
1977	Eureka	7–3	2–2	3rd	
1978	Eureka	4–6	1–3	4th	
Eureka:		23–23–1	6–6		
Macalester Scots (Minnesota Intercollegiate Athletic Conference) (1979–1989)
1979	Macalester	0–8	0–8	9th	
1980	Macalester	1–7–1	0–7–1	9th	
1981	Macalester	4–6	2–6	T–6th	
1982	Macalester	2–8	1–7	T–8th	
1983	Macalester	6–4	5–4	T–4th	
1984	Macalester	6–5	4–5	6th	
1985	Macalester	6–4	5–4	4th	
1986	Macalester	7–2–1	6–2–1	2nd	
1987	Macalester	4–6	3–6	T–7th	
1988	Macalester	4–6	3–6	T–6th	
1989	Macalester	1–9	0–9	10th	
Macalester:		41–65–2	29–64–2		
Winona State Warriors (Northern Intercollegiate Conference / Northern Sun Intercollegiate Conference) (1990–1995)
1990	Winona State	2–9	1–5	6th	
1991	Winona State	0–9	0–5	7th	
1992	Winona State	2–8	2–4	T–5th	
1993	Winona State	7–4	5–1	1st	L NAIA Division I Quarterfinal
1994	Winona State	7–3–1	5–0–1	1st	
1995	Winona State	6–5	3–3	T–3rd	
Winona State:		24–38–1	16–18–1		
Total:		88–124–4			
National championship Conference title Conference division title or championship game berth

=== Junior college ===
Year	Team	Overall	Conference	Standing	Bowl/playoffs
Rochester C&T Yellowjackets (Minnesota Community College Conference) (2001–2003)
2001	Rochester C&T	10–2	4–0	1st (Southern)	L MCCC Championship, L Dixie Bowl
2002	Rochester C&T	11–1	4–0	1st (Southern)	W MCCC Championship, L Dixie Bowl
2003	Rochester C&T	9–3	4–0	1st (Southern)	W MCCC Championship, L C.H.A.M.P.S. Heart of Texas Bowl
Rochester C&T:		30–6	12–0		
Total:		30–6			
National championship Conference title Conference division title or championship game berth
