= Warner McCollum =

American football coach and college athletics administrator

Biographical details
- Born: February 28, 1933; Kirksville, Missouri, U.S.
- Died: October 11, 2009 (aged 76); Eureka, Illinois, U.S.

Coaching career (HC unless noted)
- 1957–1960: Kirksville HS (MO) (assistant)
- 1961–1970: Eureka HS (IL)
- 1971–1974: Harlem HS (IL)
- 1975–1978: Rushville HS (IL)
- 1979–1989: Eureka

Head coaching record
- Overall: 26–71–3 (college)

Howard Warner McCollum (February 28, 1933 – October 11, 2009) was an American football coach and college athletics administrator. He was the head football coach at Eureka College in Eureka, Illinois for 11 seasons, from 1979 to 1989, compiling a record of 26–71–3. He also served as the college's athletic director, retiring in 1997.

== Head coaching record ==
=== College ===
Year	Team	Overall	Conference	Standing	Bowl/playoffs
Eureka Red Devils (Illini–Badger/Illini–Badger–Hawkeye Football Conference) (1979–1989)
1979	Eureka	2–6	1–3		
1980	Eureka	3–5–1	2–2–1	4th	
1981	Eureka	3–5–1	2–2–1	4th	
1982	Eureka	1–7	0–4	5th	
1983	Eureka	1–8	1–3		
1984	Eureka	2–7	1–3	5th	
1985	Eureka	4–5	2–3	T–3rd	
1986	Eureka	3–5–1	3–2	T–2nd	
1987	Eureka	2–8	1–4	5th	
1988	Eureka	1–9	1–4		
1989	Eureka	4–6	4–2	4th	
Eureka:		26–71–3	17–32–2		
Total:		26–71–3			
