= 1934 Northern Illinois State Evansmen football team =

American college football season

1934 Northern Illinois State Evansmen football
- Conference: Illinois Intercollegiate Athletic Conference
- Record: 5–1–2 (4–1–2 IIAC)
- Head coach: Chick Evans (6th season)
- Captain: Russ Erb
- Home stadium: Glidden Field

1934 Illinois Intercollegiate Athletic Conference football standings
	Conf.					Overall
Team	W		L		T	W		L		T
Augustana (IL) +	6	–	0	–	0	9	–	0	–	0
Millikin +	5	–	0	–	1	7	–	0	–	1
Southern Illinois	5	–	1	–	0	5	–	3	–	0
Illinois College	5	–	1	–	0	6	–	1	–	0
Northern Illinois State	4	–	1	–	2	5	–	1	–	2
Illinois Wesleyan	3	–	1	–	2	4	–	2	–	3
Western Illinois	4	–	2	–	0	5	–	3	–	0
Bradley	3	–	2	–	0	5	–	3	–	0
North Central	3	–	2	–	0	5	–	2	–	0
Elmhurst	2	–	2	–	0	4	–	2	–	1
Monmouth (IL)	2	–	2	–	0	6	–	2	–	1
Illinois State Normal	2	–	3	–	2	2	–	4	–	2
McKendree	1	–	4	–	0	4	–	5	–	0
Eastern Illinois	1	–	4	–	0	3	–	4	–	0
Carthage	1	–	4	–	0	2	–	6	–	0
Eureka	0	–	3	–	2	0	–	3	–	2
St. Viator	0	–	3	–	0	2	–	6	–	0
Wheaton (IL)	0	–	4	–	1	1	–	5	–	1
Knox (IL)	0	–	5	–	0	0	–	8	–	0
Lake Forest	0	–	4	–	0	3	–	4	–	1
+ – Conference co-champions

The 1934 Northern Illinois State Evansmen football team represented Northern Illinois State Teachers College—now known as Northern Illinois University—as a member of the Illinois Intercollegiate Athletic Conference (IIAC) during the 1934 college football season. Led by sixth-year head coach Chick Evans, the Evansmen compiled an overall record of 5–1–2 with a mark of 4–1–2 in conference play, placing fifth in the IIAC. The team played home games at the 5,500-seat Glidden Field, located on the east end of campus, in DeKalb, Illinois.

== Schedule ==
Date	Opponent	Site	Result	Source
October 6	at Eureka	Eureka, IL	W 24–0	
October 13	Illinois Wesleyan	Glidden Field; DeKalb, IL	T 6–6	
October 20	at Wheaton (IL)	Wheaton, IL	W 7–6	
October 27	Southern Illinois	Glidden Field; DeKalb, IL	L 0–6	
November 3	Illinois State	Glidden Field; DeKalb, IL	T 0–0	
November 10	at Elmhurst	Elmhurst, IL	W 40–12	
November 17	Whitewater State*	Glidden Field; DeKalb, IL	W 14–0	
November 24	at Eastern Illinois	Charleston, IL	W 18–12	
*Non-conference game
