= John Tully (American football) =

American football player and coach (born 1952)

Biographical details
- Born: February 12, 1952 (age 74)

Playing career

Football
- 1971–1974: Azusa Pacific
- Position: Quarterback

Coaching career (HC unless noted)

Football
- 1975: Los Molinos HS (CA)
- 1976: San Diego (assistant)
- 1979–1982: Grants Pass HS (OR)
- 1983: Medford HS (OR)
- 1984–1989: Southern Oregon State (assistant)
- 1990–1994: Eureka
- 1995–2013: Whitworth

Baseball
- 1993: Eureka

Head coaching record
- Overall: 131–103 (college football); 14–14 (college baseball)
- Tournaments: Football; 0–2 (NAIA D-II playoffs); 1–2 (NCAA D-III playoffs)

Accomplishments and honors

Championships
- Football; 1 IBFC (1991); 3 NWC (2001, 2006–2007)

Awards
- Football; 3× NWC Coach of the Year (2001, 2006–2007)

John Tully (born February 12, 1952) is an American football coach and former player. He Tully served as the head football coach at Eureka College in Eureka, Illinois from 1990 to 1994 and was Whitworth University in Spokane, Washington, from 1995 to 2013, compiling a career college football coaching record of 131–103. Tully was also the head baseball coach at Eureka in 1993, tallying mark of 14–14.

== Head coaching record ==
=== College football ===
Year	Team	Overall	Conference	Standing	Bowl/playoffs
Eureka Red Devils (Illini–Badger–Hawkeye/Illini–Badger Football Conference) (1990–1994)
1990	Eureka	5–5	3–4	5th	
1991	Eureka	10–1	6–0	1st	L NAIA Division II First Round
1992	Eureka	5–5	3–3		
1993	Eureka	3–7	3–3	T–3rd	
1994	Eureka	8–3	5–1	2nd	L NAIA Division II First Round
Eureka:		31–21	20–11		
Whitworth Pirates (Columbia Football Association) (1995)
1995	Whitworth	1–8	0–5	6th (Mount Hood)	
Whitworth Pirates (Northwest Conference) (1996–2013)
1996	Whitworth	1–8	1–4	5th	
1997	Whitworth	2–7	1–4	5th	
1998	Whitworth	5–5	2–3	4th	
1999	Whitworth	5–5	2–3	4th	
2000	Whitworth	6–3	3–2	3rd	
2001	Whitworth	7–2	4–1	T–1st	L NCAA Division III First Round
2002	Whitworth	7–3	3–2	T–2nd	
2003	Whitworth	4–6	2–3	4th	
2004	Whitworth	7–2	3–2	3rd	
2005	Whitworth	5–3	2–2	3rd	
2006	Whitworth	11–1	6–0	1st	L NCAA Division III Second Round
2007	Whitworth	8–2	6–0	1st	
2008	Whitworth	6–3	4–2	3rd	
2009	Whitworth	5–5	3–3	T–3rd	
2010	Whitworth	5–5	3–3	4th	
2011	Whitworth	4–6	3–3	T–4th	
2012	Whitworth	7–3	3–3	4th	
2013	Whitworth	4–6	2–4	5th	
Whitworth:		100–86	53–49		
Total:		131–103			
National championship Conference title Conference division title or championship game berth
