= Eureka Red Devils football =

College football team

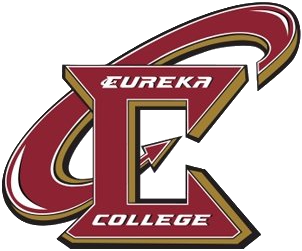
- First season: 1891; 135 years ago
- Athletic director: Sara Shaw
- Head coach: Dion Jordan; 1st season,
- Location: Eureka, Illinois
- Stadium: Pete FioRito Stadium (capacity: 2,500)
- Field: McKinzie Field
- NCAA division: Division III
- Conference: NACC
- Colors: Maroon and gold
- All-time record: 339–623–39 (.358)

Conference championships
- 3
- Mascot: Red Devils
- Website: eurekareddevils.com/football

The Eureka Red Devils football team represents Eureka College in college football at the NCAA Division III level. The Red Devils are members of the Northern Athletics Collegiate Conference (NACC), fielding its team in the NACC since 2018. Eureka played home games at Pete FioRito Stadium in Eureka, Illinois. The team's head coach is Dion Jordan, who took over the position in 2026.

== Conference affiliations ==
- Interstate Intercollegiate Athletic Conference (1921–1942)
- Independent (1949–1952)
- Prairie College Conference (1953–1957)
- NAIA independent (1957–1961)
- Gateway Conference (1962–1969)
- NAIA Division II independent (1970–1975)
- Illini–Badger Football Conference (1976–2007)
- St. Louis Intercollegiate Athletic Conference (2008)
- Upper Midwest Athletic Conference (2009–2017)
- Northern Athletics Collegiate Conference (2018–present)

== List of head coaches ==
=== Key ===
Key to symbols in coaches list
| General | | Overall | | Conference | | Postseason (Note: Although the first Rose Bowl Game was played in 1902, it has been continuously played since the 1916 game, and is recognized as the oldest bowl game by the NCAA. "—" indicates any season prior to 1916 when postseason games were not played.) | |
|---|---|---|---|---|---|---|---|
| No. | Order of coaches (Note: A running total of the number of head coaches, with coaches who served separate tenures being counted only once. Interim head coaches are represented with "Int" and are not counted in the running total. "—" indicates the team played but either without a coach or no coach is on record. "X" indicates an interim year without play.) | GC | Games coached | CW | Conference wins | PW | Postseason wins |
| DC | Division championships | OW | Overall wins | CL | Conference losses | PL | Postseason losses |
| CC | Conference championships | OL | Overall losses | CT | Conference ties | PT | Postseason ties |
| NC | National championships | OT | Overall ties (Note: Overtime rules in college football were introduced in 1996, making ties impossible in the period since.) | C% | Conference winning percentage | | |
| † | Elected to the College Football Hall of Fame | O% | Overall winning percentage (Note: When computing the win–loss percentage, a tie counts as half a win and half a loss.) | | | | |

=== Coaches ===
List of head football coaches showing season(s) coached, overall records, conference records, postseason records, championships and selected awards
| No. | Name | Season(s) | GC | OW | OL | OT | O% | CW | CL | CT | C% | PW | PL | PT | DC | CC | NC | Awards |
|---|---|---|---|---|---|---|---|---|---|---|---|---|---|---|---|---|---|---|
| — | Unknown | 1891–1893, 1895–1902, 1913 | 70 | 33 | 34 | 3 | 0.493 | – | – | – | – | – | – | – | – | – | – | – |
| 1 | George Dygert | 1894 | 8 | 5 | 2 | 1 | 0.688 | – | – | – | – | – | – | – | – | – | – | – |
| 2 | Thomas O'Neal | 1914–1915 | 15 | 7 | 8 | 0 | 0.467 | – | – | – | – | – | – | – | – | – | – | – |
| 3 | George H. Pritchard | 1916–1919 | 24 | 11 | 12 | 1 | 0.479 | – | – | – | – | – | – | – | – | – | – | – |
| 4 | Eugene L. Dersnah | 1920 | 8 | 5 | 2 | 1 | 0.688 | – | – | – | – | – | – | – | – | – | – | – |
| 5 | Ralph McKinzie | 1921–1937 | 126 | 36 | 80 | 10 | 0.325 | – | – | – | – | – | – | – | – | – | – | – |
| 6 | O. A. Hankner | 1938 | 7 | 1 | 6 | 0 | 0.143 | 0 | 2 | 0 | .000 | – | – | – | – | – | – | – |
| 7 | Harold Ave | 1939–1942 | 29 | 6 | 21 | 2 | 0.241 | – | – | – | – | – | – | – | – | – | – | – |
| 8 | Harold Barrow | 1946–1948 | 20 | 8 | 10 | 2 | 0.450 | 2 | 4 | 0 | 0.333 | – | – | – | – | – | – | – |
| 9 | Paul LaVinn | 1949–1951 | 22 | 4 | 17 | 1 | 0.205 | 1 | 2 | 0 | 0.333 | – | – | – | – | – | – | – |
| 10 | Spud Owen | 1952–1955 | 29 | 6 | 20 | 3 | 0.259 | – | – | – | – | – | – | – | – | – | – | – |
| 11 | Leo Traister | 1956–1966 | 72 | 11 | 55 | 6 | 0.194 | – | – | – | – | – | – | – | – | – | – | – |
| 12 | John Dooley | 1966–1968 | 23 | 3 | 19 | 1 | 0.152 | 2 | 9 | 0 | 0.182 | – | – | – | – | – | – | – |
| 13 | Ray Urban | 1969–1973 | 42 | 14 | 26 | 2 | 0.357 | 1 | 3 | 0 | 0.250 | – | – | – | – | – | – | – |
| 14 | Tom Hosier | 1974–1978 | 47 | 23 | 23 | 1 | 0.500 | 6 | 6 | 0 | 0.500 | – | – | – | – | – | – | – |
| 15 | Warner McCollum | 1979–1989 | 100 | 26 | 71 | 3 | 0.275 | 17 | 32 | 2 | 0.353 | – | – | – | – | – | – | – |
| 16 | John Tully | 1990–1994 | 52 | 31 | 21 | 0 | 0.596 | 20 | 11 | 0 | 0.645 | 0 | 2 | 0 | – | 1 | – | – |
| 17 | Nicholas Fletcher | 1995–1999 | 49 | 27 | 22 | 0 | 0.551 | 15 | 15 | 0 | 0.500 | – | – | – | – | – | – | – |
| 18 | Darrell Crouch | 2000–2004 | 50 | 9 | 41 | 0 | 0.180 | 7 | 28 | 0 | 0.200 | – | – | – | – | – | – | – |
| 19 | Daniel Sullivan | 2005–2008 | 35 | 5 | 30 | 0 | 0.143 | 4 | 20 | 0 | 0.167 | – | – | – | – | – | – | – |
| — | Matthew Smiley | 2008 (interim) | 4 | 2 | 2 | 0 | 0.500 | 2 | 2 | 0 | 0.500 | – | – | – | – | – | – | – |
| 20 | Kurt Barth | 2009–2023 | 147 | 70 | 77 | 0 | 0.476 | 55 | 58 | 0 | 0.487 | 0 | 2 | 0 | – | 2 | – | – |
| 21 | Randy Starks | 2024–present | 20 | 2 | 18 | 0 | 0.100 | 1 | 15 | 0 | 0.063 | – | – | – | – | – | – | – |

== Year-by-year results ==
| National champion | Conference champion | Bowl game berth | Playoff berth |

| Season | Year | Head coach | Association | Division | Conference | Record | | | | | | | Postseason | Final ranking |
| Season | Year | Head coach | Association | Division | Conference | Overall | | | Conference | | | | Postseason | Final ranking |
| Season | Year | Head coach | Association | Division | Conference | Win | Loss | Tie | Finish | Win | Loss | Tie | Postseason | Final ranking |
Eureka Red Devils
| 1891 | 1891 | Unknown | — | — | — | 0 | 3 | 0 | | | | | — | — |
| 1892 | 1892 | Unknown | — | — | — | 1 | 1 | 0 | | | | | — | — |
| 1893 | 1893 | Unknown | — | — | — | 3 | 1 | 0 | | | | | — | — |
| 1894 | 1894 | George Dygert | — | — | — | 5 | 2 | 1 | | | | | — | — |
| 1895 | 1895 | Unknown | — | — | — | 3 | 3 | 1 | | | | | — | — |
| 1896 | 1896 | Unknown | — | — | — | 6 | 2 | 0 | | | | | — | — |
| 1897 | 1897 | Unknown | — | — | — | 3 | 4 | 0 | | | | | — | — |
| 1898 | 1898 | Unknown | — | — | — | 2 | 2 | 1 | | | | | — | — |
| 1899 | 1899 | Unknown | — | — | — | 2 | 4 | 0 | | | | | — | — |
| 1900 | 1900 | Unknown | — | — | — | 2 | 1 | 1 | | | | | — | — |
| 1901 | 1901 | Unknown | — | — | — | 4 | 4 | 0 | | | | | — | — |
| 1902 | 1902 | Unknown | — | — | — | 6 | 4 | 0 | | | | | — | — |
No team from 1903 to 1912
| 1913 | 1913 | Unknown | NCAA | — | — | 1 | 5 | 0 | | | | | — | — |
| 1914 | 1914 | Thomas O'Neal | NCAA | — | — | 3 | 4 | 0 | | | | | — | — |
| 1915 | 1915 | Thomas O'Neal | NCAA | — | — | 4 | 4 | 0 | | | | | — | — |
| 1916 | 1916 | George H. Pritchard | NCAA | — | — | 5 | 3 | 0 | | | | | — | — |
| 1917 | 1917 | George H. Pritchard | NCAA | — | — | 3 | 3 | 1 | | | | | — | — |
| 1918 | 1918 | George H. Pritchard | NCAA | — | — | 0 | 1 | 2 | | | | | — | — |
| 1919 | 1919 | George H. Pritchard | NCAA | — | — | 3 | 5 | 0 | | | | | — | — |
| 1920 | 1920 | Eugene L. Dersnah | NCAA | — | — | 5 | 2 | 1 | | | | | — | — |
| 1921 | 1921 | Ralph McKinzie | NCAA | — | IIAC | 5 | 2 | 0 | | | | | — | — |
| 1922 | 1922 | Ralph McKinzie | NCAA | — | IIAC | 5 | 3 | 0 | | | | | — | — |
| 1923 | 1923 | Ralph McKinzie | NCAA | — | IIAC | 4 | 4 | 0 | | | | | — | — |
| 1924 | 1924 | Ralph McKinzie | NCAA | — | IIAC | 3 | 4 | 1 | | | | | — | — |
| 1925 | 1925 | Ralph McKinzie | NCAA | — | IIAC | 5 | 4 | 0 | | | | | — | — |
| 1926 | 1926 | Ralph McKinzie | NCAA | — | IIAC | 0 | 6 | 1 | | | | | — | — |
| 1927 | 1927 | Ralph McKinzie | NCAA | — | IIAC | 0 | 9 | 0 | | | | | — | — |
| 1928 | 1928 | Ralph McKinzie | NCAA | — | IIAC | 3 | 4 | 1 | | | | | — | — |
| 1929 | 1929 | Ralph McKinzie | NCAA | — | IIAC | 3 | 3 | 2 | | | | | — | — |
| 1930 | 1930 | Ralph McKinzie | NCAA | — | IIAC | 2 | 6 | 0 | | | | | — | — |
| 1931 | 1931 | Ralph McKinzie | NCAA | — | IIAC | 3 | 4 | 1 | | | | | — | — |
| 1932 | 1932 | Ralph McKinzie | NCAA | — | IIAC | 1 | 4 | 1 | | | | | — | — |
| 1933 | 1933 | Ralph McKinzie | NCAA | — | IIAC | 0 | 7 | 0 | | | | | — | — |
| 1934 | 1934 | Ralph McKinzie | NCAA | — | IIAC | 0 | 3 | 2 | | | | | — | — |
| 1935 | 1935 | Ralph McKinzie | NCAA | — | IIAC | 0 | 6 | 0 | | | | | — | — |
| 1936 | 1936 | Ralph McKinzie | NCAA | — | IIAC | 2 | 5 | 1 | | | | | — | — |
| 1937 | 1937 | Ralph McKinzie | NCAA | — | IIAC | 0 | 6 | 0 | | | | | — | — |
| 1938 | 1938 | O. A. Hankner | NCAA | — | IIAC | 1 | 6 | 0 | | | | | — | — |
| 1939 | 1939 | Harold Ave | NCAA | — | IIAC | 0 | 7 | 0 | | | | | — | — |
| 1940 | 1940 | Harold Ave | NCAA | — | IIAC | 2 | 5 | 1 | | | | | — | — |
| 1941 | 1941 | Harold Ave | NCAA | — | IIAC | 3 | 3 | 1 | | | | | — | — |
| 1942 | 1942 | Harold Ave | NCAA | — | IIAC | 1 | 6 | 0 | | | | | — | — |
No team from 1943 to 1945
| 1946 | 1946 | Harold Barrow | NCAA | — | — | 2 | 2 | 2 | | | | | — | — |
| 1947 | 1947 | Harold Barrow | NCAA | — | — | 2 | 5 | 0 | | | | | — | — |
| 1948 | 1948 | Harold Barrow | NCAA | — | — | 4 | 3 | 0 | | | | | — | — |
| 1949 | 1949 | Paul LaVinn | NCAA | — | Independent | 1 | 7 | 0 | | | | | — | — |
| 1950 | 1950 | Paul LaVinn | NCAA | — | Independent | 2 | 4 | 1 | | | | | — | — |
| 1951 | 1951 | Paul LaVinn | NCAA | — | Independent | 1 | 6 | 0 | | | | | — | — |
| 1952 | 1952 | Spud Owen | NCAA | — | Independent | 1 | 5 | 1 | | | | | — | — |
| 1953 | 1953 | Spud Owen | NCAA | — | PCC | 3 | 4 | 0 | | | | | — | — |
| 1954 | 1954 | Spud Owen | NCAA | — | PCC | 1 | 5 | 1 | | | | | — | — |
| 1955 | 1955 | Spud Owen | NCAA | — | PCC | 1 | 6 | 1 | T–3rd | 1 | 2 | 0 | — | — |
| 1956 | 1956 | Leo Traister | NAIA | — | PCC | 1 | 6 | 0 | | | | | — | — |
| 1957 | 1957 | Leo Traister | NAIA | — | PCC | 3 | 4 | 0 | | | | | — | — |
| 1958 | 1958 | Leo Traister | NAIA | — | Independent | 1 | 7 | 0 | | | | | — | — |
| 1959 | 1959 | Leo Traister | NAIA | — | Independent | 0 | 5 | 3 | | | | | — | — |
| 1960 | 1960 | Leo Traister | NAIA | — | Independent | 1 | 4 | 2 | | | | | — | — |
| 1961 | 1961 | Leo Traister | NAIA | — | Independent | 3 | 2 | 1 | | | | | — | — |
| 1962 | 1962 | Leo Traister | NAIA | — | Gateway | 1 | 6 | 0 | 5th | 0 | 4 | 0 | — | — |
| 1963 | 1963 | Leo Traister | NAIA | — | Gateway | 0 | 7 | 0 | 5th | 0 | 4 | 0 | — | — |
| 1964 | 1964 | Leo Traister | NAIA | — | Gateway | 0 | 7 | 0 | 5th | 0 | 4 | 0 | — | — |
| 1965 | 1965 | Leo Traister | NAIA | — | Gateway | 1 | 7 | 0 | 5th | 0 | 4 | 0 | — | — |
| 1966 | 1966 | John Dooley | NAIA | — | Gateway | 0 | 7 | 0 | 4th | 0 | 3 | 0 | — | — |
| 1967 | 1967 | John Dooley | NAIA | — | Gateway | 1 | 7 | 0 | 5th | 0 | 4 | 0 | — | — |
| 1968 | 1968 | John Dooley | NAIA | — | Gateway | 2 | 5 | 1 | 3rd | 2 | 2 | 0 | — | — |
| 1969 | 1969 | Ray Urban | NAIA | — | Gateway | 1 | 7 | 0 | T–3rd | 1 | 3 | 0 | — | — |
| 1970 | 1970 | Ray Urban | NAIA | Division II | Independent | 5 | 3 | 0 | | | | | — | — |
| 1971 | 1971 | Ray Urban | NAIA | Division II | Independent | 3 | 5 | 1 | | | | | — | — |
| 1972 | 1972 | Ray Urban | NAIA | Division II | Independent | 2 | 5 | 1 | | | | | — | — |
| 1973 | 1973 | Ray Urban | NAIA | Division II | Independent | 3 | 6 | 0 | | | | | — | — |
| 1974 | 1974 | Tom Hosier | NAIA | Division II | Independent | 3 | 6 | 0 | | | | | — | — |
| 1975 | 1975 | Tom Hosier | NAIA | Division II | Independent | 3 | 5 | 1 | | | | | — | — |
| 1976 | 1976 | Tom Hosier | NAIA | Division II | IBFC | 6 | 3 | 0 | 2nd | 3 | 1 | 0 | — | — |
| 1977 | 1977 | Tom Hosier | NAIA | Division II | IBFC | 7 | 3 | 0 | 3rd | 2 | 2 | 0 | — | — |
| 1978 | 1978 | Tom Hosier | NAIA | Division II | IBFC | 4 | 6 | 0 | 4th | 1 | 3 | 0 | — | — |
| 1979 | 1979 | Warner McCollum | NAIA | Division II | IBFC | 2 | 6 | 0 | | 1 | 3 | 0 | — | — |
| 1980 | 1980 | Warner McCollum | NAIA | Division II | IBFC | 3 | 5 | 1 | 4th | 2 | 2 | 1 | — | — |
| 1981 | 1981 | Warner McCollum | NAIA | Division II | IBFC | 3 | 5 | 1 | 4th | 2 | 2 | 1 | — | — |
| 1982 | 1982 | Warner McCollum | NAIA | Division II | IBFC | 1 | 7 | 0 | 5th | 0 | 4 | 0 | — | — |
| 1983 | 1983 | Warner McCollum | NAIA | Division II | IBFC | 1 | 8 | 0 | | 1 | 3 | 0 | — | — |
| 1984 | 1984 | Warner McCollum | NAIA | Division II | IBFC | 2 | 7 | 0 | 5th | 1 | 3 | 0 | — | — |
| 1985 | 1985 | Warner McCollum | NAIA | Division II | IBFC | 4 | 5 | 0 | T–3rd | 2 | 3 | 0 | — | — |
| 1986 | 1986 | Warner McCollum | NAIA | Division II | IBFC | 3 | 5 | 1 | T–2nd | 3 | 2 | 0 | — | — |
| 1987 | 1987 | Warner McCollum | NAIA | Division II | IBFC | 2 | 8 | 0 | 5th | 1 | 4 | 0 | — | — |
| 1988 | 1988 | Warner McCollum | NAIA | Division II | IBFC | 1 | 9 | 0 | | 1 | 4 | 0 | — | — |
| 1989 | 1989 | Warner McCollum | NAIA | Division II | IBFC | 4 | 6 | 0 | 4th | 4 | 2 | 0 | — | — |
| 1990 | 1990 | John Tully | NAIA | Division II | IBFC | 5 | 5 | 0 | 5th | 3 | 4 | 0 | — | — |
| 1991 | 1991 | John Tully | NAIA | Division II | IBFC | 10 | 1 | 0 | 1st | 6 | 0 | 0 | L NAIA Division II First Round | 3 |
| 1992 | 1992 | John Tully | NAIA | Division II | IBFC | 5 | 5 | 0 | | 3 | 3 | 0 | — | — |
| 1993 | 1993 | John Tully | NAIA | Division II | IBFC | 3 | 7 | 0 | | 3 | 3 | 0 | — | — |
| 1994 | 1994 | John Tully | NAIA | Division II | IBFC | 8 | 3 | 0 | | 5 | 1 | 0 | L NAIA Division II First Round | — |
| 1995 | 1995 | Nicholas Fletcher | NAIA | Division II | IBFC | 9 | 1 | 0 | 1st | 6 | 0 | 0 | Conference champion | — |
| 1996 | 1996 | Nicholas Fletcher | NCAA | Division III | IBFC | 5 | 4 | 0 | 4th | 2 | 3 | 0 | — | — |
| 1997 | 1997 | Nicholas Fletcher | NCAA | Division III | IBFC | 5 | 5 | 0 | 4th | 2 | 3 | 0 | — | — |
| 1998 | 1998 | Nicholas Fletcher | NCAA | Division III | IBFC | 4 | 6 | 0 | 6th | 2 | 5 | 0 | — | — |
| 1999 | 1999 | Nicholas Fletcher | NCAA | Division III | IBFC | 4 | 6 | 0 | T–5th | 3 | 4 | 0 | — | — |
| 2000 | 2000 | Darrell Crouch | NCAA | Division III | IBFC | 2 | 8 | 0 | 7th | 1 | 6 | 0 | — | — |
| 2001 | 2001 | Darrell Crouch | NCAA | Division III | IBFC | 1 | 9 | 0 | T–7th | 1 | 6 | 0 | — | — |
| 2002 | 2002 | Darrell Crouch | NCAA | Division III | IBFC | 2 | 8 | 0 | 6th | 2 | 5 | 0 | — | — |
| 2003 | 2003 | Darrell Crouch | NCAA | Division III | IBFC | 1 | 9 | 0 | 8th | 1 | 6 | 0 | — | — |
| 2004 | 2004 | Darrell Crouch | NCAA | Division III | IBFC | 3 | 7 | 0 | 6th | 2 | 5 | 0 | — | — |
| 2005 | 2005 | Daniel Sullivan | NCAA | Division III | IBFC | 1 | 9 | 0 | 7th | 1 | 6 | 0 | — | — |
| 2006 | 2006 | Daniel Sullivan | NCAA | Division III | IBFC | 0 | 10 | 0 | 8th | 0 | 7 | 0 | — | — |
| 2007 | 2007 | Daniel Sullivan | NCAA | Division III | IBFC | 2 | 8 | 0 | T–6th | 2 | 5 | 0 | — | — |
| 2008 | 2008 | Daniel Sullivan / Matthew Smiley | NCAA | Division III | SLIAC | 4 | 5 | 0 | T–5th | 3 | 4 | 0 | — | — |
| 2009 | 2009 | Kurt Barth | NCAA | Division III | UMAC | 4 | 6 | 0 | 3rd (South) | 1 | 2 | 0 | — | — |
| 2010 | 2010 | Kurt Barth | NCAA | Division III | UMAC | 2 | 8 | 0 | 7th | 2 | 5 | 0 | — | — |
| 2011 | 2011 | Kurt Barth | NCAA | Division III | UMAC | 4 | 6 | 0 | 6th | 4 | 5 | 0 | — | — |
| 2012 | 2012 | Kurt Barth | NCAA | Division III | UMAC | 4 | 6 | 0 | 5th | 3 | 5 | 0 | — | — |
| 2013 | 2013 | Kurt Barth | NCAA | Division III | UMAC | 8 | 2 | 0 | 3rd | 7 | 2 | 0 | — | — |
| 2014 | 2014 | Kurt Barth | NCAA | Division III | UMAC | 2 | 8 | 0 | 8th | 2 | 7 | 0 | — | — |
| 2015 | 2015 | Kurt Barth | NCAA | Division III | UMAC | 5 | 5 | 0 | T–5th | 4 | 5 | 0 | — | — |
| 2016 | 2016 | Kurt Barth | NCAA | Division III | UMAC | 2 | 8 | 0 | T–2nd | 7 | 2 | 0 | – | — |
| 2017 | 2017 | Kurt Barth | NCAA | Division III | UMAC | 8 | 3 | 0 | 1st | 8 | 1 | 0 | L NCAA Division III First Round | – |
| 2018 | 2018 | Kurt Barth | NCAA | Division III | NACC | 9 | 2 | 0 | 1st | 6 | 1 | 0 | L NCAA Division III First Round | – |
| 2019 | 2019 | Kurt Barth | NCAA | Division III | NACC | 6 | 4 | 0 | 3rd | 4 | 3 | 0 | – | — |
| 2020–21 | 2020–21 | Kurt Barth | NCAA | Division III | NACC | 2 | 3 | 0 | T–4th | 1 | 2 | 0 | – | — |
| 2021 | 2021 | Kurt Barth | NCAA | Division III | NACC | 2 | 8 | 0 | 7th | 2 | 6 | 0 | — | — |
| 2022 | 2022 | Kurt Barth | NCAA | Division III | NACC | 2 | 8 | 0 | T–7th | 2 | 6 | 0 | — | — |
| 2023 | 2023 | Kurt Barth | NCAA | Division III | NACC | 4 | 6 | 0 | 7th | 2 | 6 | 0 | — | — |
| 2024 | 2024 | Randy Starks | NCAA | Division III | NACC | 0 | 10 | 0 | 9th | 0 | 8 | 0 | — | — |
| 2025 | 2025 | Randy Starks | NCAA | Division III | NACC | 2 | 8 | 0 | 8th | 1 | 7 | 0 | — | — |
