= Max Bowman =

American football and baseball coach

Biographical details
- Born: Niagara Falls, New York, U.S.
- Education: Nyack College (1969); New York University

Coaching career (HC unless noted)

Football
- ?: Nyack HS (NY)
- ?: Monroe-Woodbury HS (NY)
- 1972–1976: Westchester (OC)
- 1977–1978: Westchester
- 1979: Lees–McRae (OC)
- 1980: Boston College (assistant)
- 1981 (summer): West Virginia Rockets (OC)
- 1981: Kent State (RB)
- 1982–1985: UTEP (AHC/OL)
- 1986–1993: Greenville
- 1994: Buffalo (assoc. HC/ST)
- 1998–2002: Buffalo Bills (AHC/TE)
- 2005: Rutgers (chief of staff)
- 2009–2011: Westfield HS (TX) (AHC)
- 2012–2017: Houston Christian HS (TX)

Baseball
- 1974–1977: Westchester

Head coaching record
- Overall: 50–14–1 (college football); 11–8 (club/junior college football); 74–22 (junior college baseball)

Accomplishments and honors

Championships
- Football; 2 IBHFC / IBFC (1989, 1992); 2 PCC (1987–1988); Baseball; Mid Hudson (1974–1977)

Max Bowman is an American former football and baseball coach. He was the head football coach for Westchester Community College from 1977 to 1978 and Greenville University from 1986 to 1993.

== Coaching career ==
Bowman began his career as the head football coaches for Nyack High School and Monroe-Woodbury High School. In 1972, he joined Westchester Community College as the football team's offensive coordinator. In 1974, he was named head baseball coach. In four seasons as head baseball coach he led the team to four-consecutive Mid Hudson Conference (MHC) championships. In 1977, he took over as head football coach. In his inaugural season he led the team to a 9–1 season, which was also their last as a member of the National Club Football Association (NCFA). In 1978, he led the team through their first varsity season as a member of the Atlantic Coastal Conference (ACC). The season ended with a 2–7 record, leading Bowman to resigned following the year.

In 1979, Bowman was hired as the offensive coordinator at Lees–McRae. After one season he was hired as an assistant at Boston College. He spent the summer of 1981 as the assistant head coach and offensive coordinator for the West Virginia Rockets of the American Football Association (AFA). The team finished with a 10–1 record and won the American Bowl IV. In the fall, he followed Ed Chlebek from Boston College to Kent State as his running backs coach. After one year Bowman was hired as the assistant head coach and offensive line coach for UTEP.

In 1986, Bowman was hired to begin the football program at Greenville University. The team finished its inaugural season with an 8–1 record. He resigned after seven years with the team, amassing an overall record of 50–14–1 and winning four conference championships.

In 1994, Bowman was hired as the associate head coach and special teams coordinator for Buffalo under head coach Jim Ward. Bowman was not retained as an on-field coach after the season but remained with Buffalo as an administrative assistant until 1997. In 1998, he was hired as the assistant head coach and tight ends coach under Wade Phillips for the Buffalo Bills of the National Football League (NFL). In 2005, he was hired as the chief of staff for Rutgers. In 2009, he returned to high school football as the assistant head coach for Westfield High School. Then, from 2012 to 2017, he served as the head football coach for Houston Christian High School.

== Head coaching record ==
=== College football ===
Year	Team	Overall	Conference	Standing	Bowl/playoffs	NAIA D2^{#}
Greenville Panthers (Prairie College Conference) (1987–1988)
1987	Greenville	8–1		1st		
1988	Greenville	8–1		1st		22
Greenville Panthers (Illini–Badger–Hawkeye / Illini–Badger Football Conference Football Conference) (1989–1993)
1989	Greenville	7–1–1	6–0	1st		
1990	Greenville	8–2	6–1	2nd	L NAIA Division II First Round	13
1991	Greenville	4–5	2–4	5th		
1992	Greenville	7–2		1st		22
1993	Greenville	8–2	5–1	2nd		
Greenville:		50–14–1				
Total:		50–14–1				
National championship Conference title Conference division title or championship game berth

=== Club/junior college football ===
Year	Team	Overall	Conference	Standing	Bowl/playoffs
Westchester Vikings (National Club Football Association) (1977)
1977	Westchester	9–1			
Westchester Vikings (Atlantic Coastal Conference) (1978)
1978	Westchester	2–7			
Westchester:		11–8			
Total:		11–8			
