= Harold Barrow =

American football coach

Biographical details
- Born: August 8, 1909; New Bloomfield, Missouri, U.S.
- Died: May 15, 2005 (aged 95); Forsyth County, North Carolina, U.S.
- Education: Westminster College 1936

Coaching career (HC unless noted)

Football
- 1946–1948: Eureka

Basketball
- 1945–1948: Eureka

Head coaching record
- Overall: 8–10–2 (football)

Harold Marion Barrow (August 8, 1909 – May 15, 2005) was an American college football and college basketball coach. He served as head football at Eureka College located in Eureka, Illinois for three seasons, from 1946 to 1948, compiling a record of 8–10–2. He later coached at Evansville College in Evansville, Illinois.

== Head coaching record ==
=== Football ===
Year	Team	Overall	Conference	Standing	Bowl/playoffs
Eureka Red Devils (Independent) (1946)
1946	Eureka	2–2–2			
Eureka Red Devils (Pioneer Conference) (1947–1948)
1947	Eureka	2–5	1–2	3rd	
1948	Eureka	4–3	1–2	3rd	
Eureka:		8–10–2	2–4		
Total:		8–10–2			
