= 1934 Southern Illinois Maroons football team =

American college football season

1934 Southern Illinois Maroons football
- Conference: Illinois Intercollegiate Athletic Conference
- Record: 5–3 (5–1 IIAC)
- Head coach: William McAndrew (18th season)

1934 Illinois Intercollegiate Athletic Conference football standings
	Conf.					Overall
Team	W		L		T	W		L		T
Augustana (IL) +	6	–	0	–	0	9	–	0	–	0
Millikin +	5	–	0	–	1	7	–	0	–	1
Southern Illinois	5	–	1	–	0	5	–	3	–	0
Illinois College	5	–	1	–	0	6	–	1	–	0
Northern Illinois State	4	–	1	–	2	5	–	1	–	2
Illinois Wesleyan	3	–	1	–	2	4	–	2	–	3
Western Illinois	4	–	2	–	0	5	–	3	–	0
Bradley	3	–	2	–	0	5	–	3	–	0
North Central	3	–	2	–	0	5	–	2	–	0
Elmhurst	2	–	2	–	0	4	–	2	–	1
Monmouth (IL)	2	–	2	–	0	6	–	2	–	1
Illinois State Normal	2	–	3	–	2	2	–	4	–	2
McKendree	1	–	4	–	0	4	–	5	–	0
Eastern Illinois	1	–	4	–	0	3	–	4	–	0
Carthage	1	–	4	–	0	2	–	6	–	0
Eureka	0	–	3	–	2	0	–	3	–	2
St. Viator	0	–	3	–	0	2	–	6	–	0
Wheaton (IL)	0	–	4	–	1	1	–	5	–	1
Knox (IL)	0	–	5	–	0	0	–	8	–	0
Lake Forest	0	–	4	–	0	3	–	4	–	1
+ – Conference co-champions

The 1934 Southern Illinois Maroons football team was an American football team that represented Southern Illinois Normal University (now known as Southern Illinois University Carbondale) in the Illinois Intercollegiate Athletic Conference (IIAC) during the 1934 college football season. In its 18th season under head coach William McAndrew, the team compiled a 5–3 record (5–1 against conference opponents) and finished in third place out of 20 teams in the IIAC.

== Schedule ==
Date	Opponent	Site	Result	Attendance	Source
September 28	St. Viator	Carbondale, IL	W 14–10		
October 5	at Cape Girardeau*	Houck Stadium; Cape Girardeau, MO	L 6–14		
October 13	Illinois State Normal	Carbondale, IL	W 14–6		
October 27	at Northern Illinois State	Glidden Field; DeKalb, IL	W 6–0		
November 2	McKendree	Carbondale, IL	W 19–12	2,000	
November 9	Cape Girardeau*	Carbondale, IL	L 0–32		
November 17	Eastern Illinois^{†}	Carbondale, IL	W 13–6	4,000	
November 24	Illinois Wesleyan	Carbondale, IL	L 2–6		
*Non-conference game; ^{†}Homecoming
