= John Tully =

John Tully may refer to:

- CCGS John P. Tully, a vessel in the Canadian Coast Guard
- Jack Tully (1885–1966), Australian politician
- John A. Tully (born 1947), author and academic at Victoria University, Melbourne
- John C. Tully (born 1942), American theoretical chemist
- John Tully (American football) (born 1952), college football coach
- John Tully (Irish politician) (1904–1977), Irish Clann na Poblachta politician
- John Tully (architect), Canadian architect
