= Jamel Wright =

American academic administrator

27th President of Eureka College
- Incumbent
- Assumed office July 1, 2017; Interim: July 1, 2016 – June 30, 2017
- Preceded by: J. David Arnold

Personal details
- Children: 2
- Education: Missouri Western State University; University of Kansas

Jamel Santa Cruze Wright is an American academic administrator serving as the 27th president of Eureka College since 2017.

== Life ==
Wright is the youngest of five children. She is from St. Louis. Her parents owned a janitorial services company and her mother, Shirley Santa Cruze, was a teacher. Wright earned a B.A. in communication studies from Missouri Western State University. She was a first-generation college student. She completed a M.S. and Ph.D. (2004) in communication studies at the University of Kansas.

Wright served as the coordinator of the America Reads Program at Missouri Western, president of the St. Joseph Area Literacy Coalition, and a teacher with the Freedom School initiative of the Children's Defense Fund. While completing her doctoral studies, she was the communication specialist to J. David Arnold, then vice president for academic and student affairs at Missouri Western. Following graduation, Wright worked as an assistant professor of communication at Boston College. She later served as a professor at Saint Louis University. Wright joined Eureka College in 2014 as the special assistant to president Arnold. She was later promoted to vice president of strategic and diversity initiatives. She served as the interim president from July 1, 2016, to June 30, 2017. Wright became its 27th president on July 1, 2017. She is the first woman and African American to serve in the role. She received a 2024 Joseph R. Biden Achievement Award.

Wright is married and has a daughter and stepson.
