= John Dooley (American football) =

American football coach (born c. 1933)

Biographical details
- Born: c. 1933

Coaching career (HC unless noted)

Football
- 1957–1961: Ashton Morris HS (IL)
- 1962–1963: Mount Morris HS (IL) (assistant)
- 1964–1965: Mount Morris HS (IL)
- 1966–1968: Eureka

Basketball
- 1957–1962: Ashton Morris HS (IL)

Baseball
- 1958–1962: Ashton Morris HS (IL)

Head coaching record
- Overall: 3–19–1 (college football)

John "Jay" Dooley (born c. 1933) is an American former football coach. He was the head football coach at Eureka College in Eureka, Illinois two seasons, from 1966 to 1968, compiling a record of 3–19–1.

Dooley attended high school in Monmouth, Illinois. He graduated from Millikin University in Decatur, Illinois, and earned a master's degree in physical education from Northern Illinois University in DeKalb, Illinois.

In 1957, Dooley was hired as athletic coach at Ashton High School in Ashton, Illinois. He coached football, basketball, and baseball at Ashton before resigning in 1962 to become an assistant coach in football and basketball at Mount Morris High School in Mount Morris, Illinois.

Dooley resigned from his post at Eureka in the spring of 1969.

== Head coaching record ==
=== College ===
Year	Team	Overall	Conference	Standing	Bowl/playoffs
Eureka Red Devils (Gateway Conference) (1966–1968)
1966	Eureka	0–7	0–3	4th	
1967	Eureka	1–7	0–4	5th	
1968	Eureka	2–5–1	2–2	3rd	
Eureka:		3–19–1	2–9		
Total:		3–19–1			
