= O. A. Hankner =

American football and basketball coach

- Hankner pictured in The Tecoan 1940, ECU yearbook

Biographical details
- Born: June 18, 1908; Tripoli, Iowa, U.S.
- Died: October 3, 1946 (aged 38); Champaign, Illinois, U.S.
- Education: University of Illinois

Coaching career (HC unless noted)

Football
- 1938: Eureka
- 1939: East Carolina

Basketball
- 1937–1939: Eureka

Head coaching record
- Overall: 1–14 (football); 13–18 (basketball)

Oscar August Hankner (June 18, 1908 – October 3, 1946) was an American football and basketball coach. He served as the head football coach at Eureka College in Eureka, Illinois in 1938 and at East Carolina Teachers College—now known as East Carolina University–in 1939, compiling a career college football coaching record 1–14. He was also the head basketball coach at Eureka from 1937 to 1939, tallying a mark of 13–18.

Hanker was born in Tripoli, Iowa. He died on October 3, 1946, at Burnham Hospital in Champaign, Illinois, after suffering from an intestinal obstruction.

== Head coaching record ==
=== Football ===
Year	Team	Overall	Conference	Standing	Bowl/playoffs
Eureka Red Devils (Illinois Intercollegiate Athletic Conference) (1938)
1938	Eureka	1–6	0–2	7th	
Eureka:		1–6	0–2		
East Carolina Pirates (Independent) (1939)
1939	East Carolina	0–8			
East Carolina:		0–8			
Total:		1–14			
