= Traister =

Traister is a surname. Notable people with the surname include:

- Leo Traister (1919–2020), American football coach
- Rebecca Traister (born 1975), American author
