= J. David Arnold =

American academic

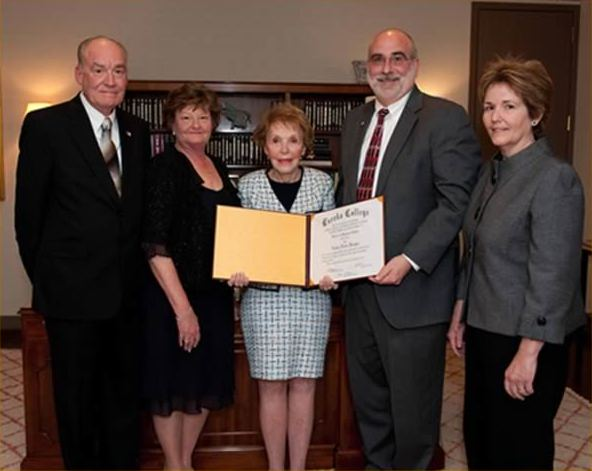
Arnold, second from right, poses with former First Lady Nancy Reagan after awarding her an honorary degree from Eureka College, March 31, 2009.

J. David Arnold is an American academic who is president and professor of psychology at Eureka College in Eureka, Illinois.

Arnold has been vice president for academic and student affairs at Missouri Western State College, St. Joseph, Missouri. He also served as vice president for academic affairs and provost at Salve Regina University. In addition he has served as provost at St. John Fisher College and as a dean and grants officer at Clarion University. He started his academic career teaching psychology and writing at St. Lawrence University, a residential liberal arts college where he was tenured and promoted before becoming an associate dean.

== Personal and educational ==
A native of Lancaster, Pennsylvania, and the first in his family to graduate from college, Arnold completed his undergraduate degree with honors at Bloomsburg University (formerly Bloomsburg State College), graduate work at the University of New Hampshire, and summer post-doctoral study at the Institute for Educational Management at Harvard University. Arnold and his wife Katherine have three children.
