= George Pritchard =

George Pritchard may refer to:

- George Pritchard (missionary) (1796–1883), British Christian missionary and diplomat in the South Pacific
- George Henry Pritchard (1861–1930), dual code footballer in Australian rules football and rugby union
- George M. Pritchard (1886–1955), North Carolina politician
- George H. Pritchard (1888–1960), American sports coach
