= Thomas O'Neal =

American football coach

Coaching career (HC unless noted)
- 1914–1915: Eureka

Administrative career (AD unless noted)
- c. 1915: Eureka

Head coaching record
- Overall: 7–8

Thomas F. O'Neal was an American college football coach and athletics administrator. He served as the head football coach at Eureka College in Eureka, Illinois for two seasons, from 1914 to 1915, compiling a record of 7–8. A native of Bloomington, Illinois, O'Neal was also the athletic director at Eureka. He married Flossie Moore, of Eureka, on June 11, 1915.

== Head coaching record ==
Year	Team	Overall	Conference	Standing	Bowl/playoffs
Eureka Red Devils (Illinois Intercollegiate Athletic Conference) (1914–1915)
1914	Eureka	3–4			
1915	Eureka	4–4			
Eureka:		7–8			
Total:		7–8			
