= Harold Ave =

American football and basketball coach (1900–1986)

- Ave pictured in Sequel 1950, Western Illinois yearbook

Biographical details
- Born: March 29, 1900; Cleveland, Ohio, U.S.
- Died: August 9, 1986 (aged 86); Macomb, Illinois, U.S.

Playing career

Football
- 1921: Carnegie Tech
- c. 1922: Baldwin–Wallace
- Position: Guard

Coaching career (HC unless noted)

Football
- c. 1935: Willoughby HS (OH)
- 1938: Eastern Illinois
- 1939–1942: Eureka
- 1948: Western Illinois

Basketball
- 1939–1942: Eureka

Administrative career (AD unless noted)
- c. 1935: Willoughby HS (OH)
- 1939–1942: Eureka

Head coaching record
- Overall: 15–28–2 (football); 35–25 (basketball)

Harold Charles Ave (March 29, 1900 – August 9, 1986) was an American football and basketball coach. He served as the head football coach at Eureka College in 1938, at Eastern Illinois State Teachers College—now known as Eastern Illinois University—from 1939 to 1942, and at Western Illinois University in 1948, compiling a career college football record of 15–28–2. Ave was also the head basketball coach at Eureka from 1939 to 1942, tallying a mark of 35–25.

Ave played college football at Baldwin-Wallace College—now known as Baldwin Wallace University—and the Carnegie Institute of Technology—now known as Carnegie Mellon University. He was the athletic director and head coach at Willoughby High School in Willoughby, Ohio before he was hired at Eastern Illinois.

== Head coaching record ==
=== Football ===
Year	Team	Overall	Conference	Standing	Bowl/playoffs
Eastern Illinois Panthers (Illinois Intercollegiate Athletic Conference) (1938)
1938	Eastern Illinois	5–3	1–3	T–5th	
Eastern Illinois:		5–3	1–3		
Eureka Red Devils (Illinois Intercollegiate Athletic Conference) (1939–1942)
1939	Eureka	0–7	0–2	7th	
1940	Eureka	2–5–1	0–2	8th	
1941	Eureka	3–3–1	0–0	NA	
1942	Eureka	1–6			
Eureka:		6–21–2			
Western Illinois Leathernecks (Illinois Intercollegiate Athletic Conference) (1948)
1948	Western Illinois	4–4	1–3	3rd	
Western Illinois:		4–4	1–3		
Total:		15–28–2			
