= Nick Fletcher =

Nick Fletcher may refer to:

- Nick Fletcher (film editor)
- Nick Fletcher (politician)

== See also ==
- Nicholas Fletcher, American football coach
