= Gateway Conference =

Gateway Conference may refer to:

- Gateway Conference (1962–1975), NAIA-affiliated conference from 1962 to 1975
- Gateway Collegiate Athletic Conference, a women's-only NCAA Division I conference from 1982 to 1992
- Missouri Valley Football Conference, an NCAA Division I Football Championship Subdivision (FCS) conference, known as the Gateway Football Conference from 1992 to 2008
- Gateway Church Conference, an annual gathering of evangelical pastors held by Gateway Church in Southlake, Texas, near Dallas
