= Eureka College Administration Building and Chapel =

Historic buildings in Eureka, Illinois, US

- Eureka College Administration and Chapel
- U.S. National Register of Historic Places
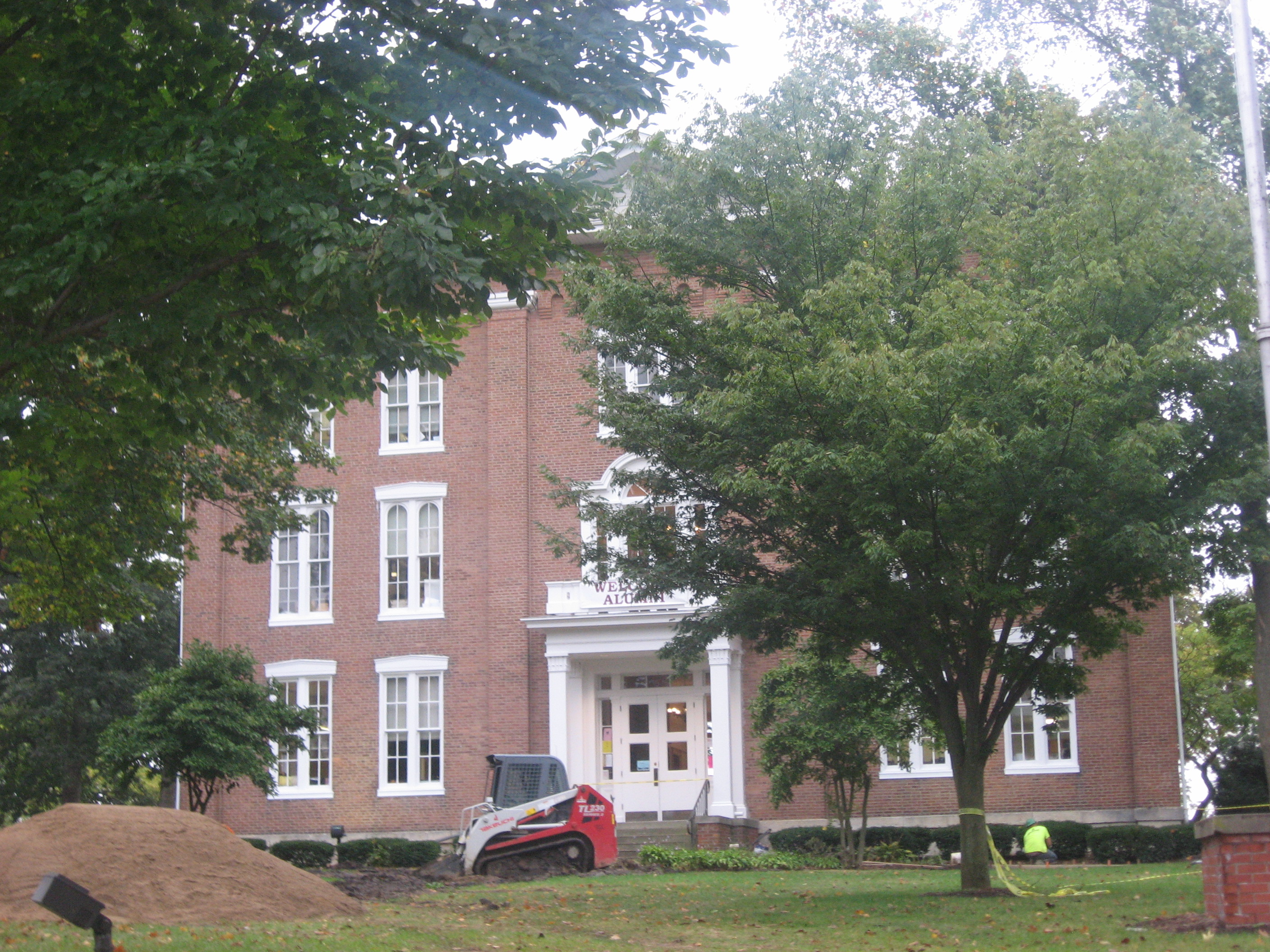
- The administration building

- Location within Illinois Location within the United States
- Interactive map showing the location of Eureka College Administration and Chapel
- Location: 300 College Ave., Eureka, Illinois
- Coordinates: 40°42′50″N 89°16′09″W
- Area: 2.8 acres (1.1 ha)
- Built: 1858
- Architectural style: Georgian, Italianate, Federal
- NRHP reference No.: 80001426
- Added to NRHP: May 31, 1980

The Eureka College Administration Building and Chapel are the two oldest buildings on the campus of Eureka College in Eureka, Illinois. The administration building was built in 1858; as the campus became too large to fit in one building, the chapel was added in 1869. The buildings were the only ones at the college for almost twenty-five years and are still the focal point of the campus. In addition to their role in the college's history, both buildings are architecturally significant. The administration building has an Italianate design, which can be seen most prominently in the frieze and roof overhang, with Federal-influenced windows and Georgian main entrances. The chapel has an Italian Villa design with bracketed eaves and tall, thin arched windows.

The buildings were added to the National Register of Historic Places on May 31, 1980.
