= Nicholas Fletcher =

American football player and coach (born 1954)

Biographical details
- Born: August 10, 1954 (age 72)

Playing career
- 1973–1975: Johns Hopkins

Coaching career (HC unless noted)
- 1988–1990: Carmel HS (NY)
- 1992: Siena (assistant)
- 1993–1994: Siena (OC)
- 1995–1999: Eureka
- 2000–2009: Denison

Head coaching record
- Overall: 63–86 (college)

Accomplishments and honors

Championships
- 1 IBFC (1995)

Nicholas Fletcher (born August 10, 1954) is an American football coach and former player. He served as the head football coach at Eureka College in Eureka, Illinois from 1995 to 1999 and Denison University in Granville, Ohio from 2000 to 2009, compiling a career college football coaching record of 63–86.

== Playing career ==
Fletcher played college football at Johns Hopkins University in Baltimore, Maryland from 1973 until 1975.

== Coaching career ==
Fletcher was the offensive coordinator at Siena College in Loudonville, New York, where he coached Reggie Greene who was NCAA Division I-AA's all-time leading rusher at the time of his graduation.

=== Eureka ===
Fletcher was the head football coach at Eureka College in Eureka, Illinois for five seasons, from 1995 to 1999, compiling a record of 27–22. His 1995 Eureka team was second in the nation in total offense and passing offense, amassing a 9–1 record. The 1995 team was later inducted into the Eureka College Hall of Fame. At Eureka, Fletcher coached Kurt Barth, who was the all-time leading receiver in NCAA Division III at the time of his graduation.

=== Denison ===
Fletcher was the head football coach at Denison University in Granville, Ohio from 2000 to 2009, tallying mark of 36–64 in ten seasons. Fletcher's teams produced 39 all-time Denison offensive records and had the best finish, third place, for Denison in the North Coast Athletic Conference (NCAC). Fletcher coached Denison's all-time leading career passer, Larry Cappetto, and single-season passing record holder, Greg Neuendorf. He also coached Denisons top two all-time leading receivers, Josh Jirgens and Ryan Hite, as well as three of Denisons all-time leading rushers, Phil Bouwhuis, Jon Berg and Fred Lee.

Fletcher was fired following the 2009 season and was replaced by Jack Hatem.

== Head coaching record ==
=== College ===
Year	Team	Overall	Conference	Standing	Bowl/playoffs
Eureka Red Devils (Illini–Badger Football Conference) (1995–1999)
1995	Eureka	9–1	6–0	1st	
1996	Eureka	5–4	2–3	4th	
1997	Eureka	5–5	2–3	4th	
1998	Eureka	4–6	2–5	6th	
1999	Eureka	4–6	3–4	T–5th	
Eureka:		27–22	15–15		
Denison Big Red (North Coast Athletic Conference) (2000–2009)
2000	Denison	2–8	2–5	T–7th	
2001	Denison	2–8	2–5	T–7th	
2002	Denison	2–8	2–5	8th	
2003	Denison	3–7	2–4	T–6th	
2004	Denison	6–4	4–3	T–4th	
2005	Denison	5–5	3–6	T–5th	
2006	Denison	3–7	3–4	T–6th	
2007	Denison	4–6	3–4	T–6th	
2008	Denison	6–4	4–3	T–3rd	
2009	Denison	3–7	2–5	T–8th	
Denison:		36–64	27–44		
Total:		63–86			
National championship Conference title Conference division title or championship game berth
