= Emik Avakian =

Armenian American inventor

- Born: August 5, 1923; Tabriz, Persia
- Died: July 11, 2013 (aged 89); Chicopee, Massachusetts
- Education: Eureka College (BS); Columbia University (MS)
- Occupation: Inventor

Emik Avakian (Armenian: Էմիք Աւաքեան; August 15, 1923 – July 11, 2013) was an Armenian American inventor and owner of numerous patents including breath-operated computer, a mechanism that facilitates putting wheelchairs on automobiles, and a self operating robotic wheel that converts manual wheel chairs into automatic. Many of his inventions were geared towards the improvement of disabled people's lives, and he won many awards recognizing these efforts.

== Life ==
Of Armenian descent, Emik Avakian was born in Tabriz, Persia in 1924. Avakian was born with a severe case of cerebral palsy, but this did not affect his cognitive abilities. In order to seek medical assistance for Emik, the Avakian family traveled from Persia, to Russia, to Germany, and finally settled in New York City. By the age of thirteen, Emik was already fixing many electrical engineering problems around the household. Although he suffered considerably, Avakian graduated magna cum laude from Eureka College with a degree in physics and mathematics. He later earned his master's degree at Columbia University. Throughout his years as a student, Avakian had trouble communicating with typists who would write down notes for him.

He resided in Massachusetts with his wife Anne until his death.

== Inventions ==
In order to overcome many of the difficulties he experienced in life, Avakian created a series of inventions. One of his more notable inventions was a typewriter that would produce letters from breath rather than typing. The typewriter would operate according to breath measurement and sound that would be blown into four microphones. Although the mechanism was slow, it was still more cost effective to use the device than to hire an assisting type writer.

Another significant invention was the "information retrieval and storage apparatus," which was a machine that could display library and archive information more quickly than other methods.

== Awards ==
- In 1961, President of the United States John F. Kennedy honored Avakian for his outstanding contributions to handicap employment.
- Eminent Engineer Award (1979)
- Armenian Bicentennial Committee's "Excellence in the Field of Science Award" (1976)
- Shah of Iran Crown Medal (1963)
- Honorary Doctorate Award of Eureka College (1996)

In addition to his awards, Avakian was featured in renowned and local publications, including Life magazine and Mechanix Illustrated in 1952, 1953, and 1962.

== Notable patents ==
- Information Storage, retrieval, and Handling Apparatus United States Patent no. 3,191,006 filed date: Apr. 3, 1962, issue date: Jun. 22, 1965.
- Energy Projecting and Scanning Apparatus United States Patent no. 3,283,147, filed date: May 9, 1962, issued date: Nov. 1, 1966.
- Apparatus and System for Interconnecting Circuits and Electronic Components United States Patent no. 3,880,486 filed date: Mar. 5, 1973 issued date: Apr. 2, 1975.
- Data Entry Devices United States Patent no. 4,077,036, filed Aug 30, 1976, issued Feb 28, 1978.
- Method of and Apparatus for Motorizing Manually Powered Vehicles United States Patent no. 5,186,269, filed date: Nov 7, 1991, issued date: Feb 16, 1993.
- Drive System for Wheelchairs or the like United States Patent no. 5,427,193, filed date: Apr. 19, 1993, issued date: Jun 27, 1995.
- Vehicle Loading System United States Patent no. 5,242,257, filed date Nov. 8, 1991, issued date: Sep. 7, 1993.
- Flow Control System and Restrictor for use therein United States Patent no. 4,372,304, filed date: Oct 15, 1980, issue date: Feb 8, 1983.
