= Maud N. Peffers =

American politician

Maud Norris Peffers (March 7, 1888 – August 25, 1956) was an American politician.

Peffers was born on a farm near Oswego, Illinois. In 1896, she moved to Aurora, Illinois. Peffers graduated from West Aurora High School and AAllen's Business College in Aurora, Illinois. Peffers served in the Illinois House of Representatives from 1936 until her death in 1956. Peffers succeeded her husband John Peffers when he died while still in office. She was involved in the Republican Party. Peffers died in Aurora, Illinois.
