= Prairie College Conference =

The Prairie College Conference was an intercollegiate athletic conference that existed from 1953 to 1991. The league had members the states of Illinois and Indiana.

== History ==
The Prairie College Conference formed in 1953 with eight members: Blackburn College in Carlinville, Illinois, Concordia Seminary in Springfield, Illinois, Eureka College in Eureka, Illinois, Greenville College—now known as Greenville University—in Greenville, Illinois, McKendree College—now known as McKendree University—in Lebanon, Illinois, Principia College in Elsah, Illinois, Rose Polytechnic Institute—now known as Rose–Hulman Institute of Technology—in Terre Haute, Indiana, and Shurtleff College in Alton, Illinois.

== Football champions ==
- 1953 – Rose Poly
- 1954 – Principia
- 1955 – Principia and Illinois College
- 1956 – Principia
- 1957 – Rose Poly
- 1958 – Rose Poly
- 1959 – Illinois College and Principia
- 1960 – Principia
- 1961 – Illinois College and Principia
- 1962 – Principia
- 1963 – Principia
- 1964 – Principia
- 1965 – Illinois College, Principia, Rose Poly
- 1966 – Principia
- 1967 – Principia
- 1968–1987 – conference did not sponsor football
- 1988 – Greenville (IL)

== Yearly football standings ==
1955 Prairie College Conference football standings
	Conf.					Overall
Team	W		L		T	W		L		T
Illinois College +	2	–	1	–	0	4	–	1	–	1
Principia +	2	–	1	–	0	3	–	2	–	2
Eureka	1	–	2	–	0	1	–	6	–	1
Rose Poly	1	–	2	–	0	1	–	6	–	1
+ – Conference co-champions

1959 Prairie College Conference football standings
	Conf.					Overall
Team	W		L		T	W		L		T
Illinois College +	1	–	0	–	1	3	–	2	–	2
Principia +	1	–	0	–	1	4	–	3	–	1
Rose Poly	0	–	2	–	0	2	–	4	–	1
+ – Conference co-champions

1960 Prairie College Conference football standings
	Conf.					Overall
Team	W		L		T	W		L		T
Principia $	2	–	0	–	0	5	–	3	–	0
Illinois College	1	–	1	–	0	5	–	3	–	0
Rose Poly	0	–	2	–	0	1	–	5	–	1
$ – Conference champion

1961 Prairie College Conference football standings
	Conf.					Overall
Team	W		L		T	W		L		T
Principia +	1	–	0	–	1	3	–	3	–	2
Illinois College +	1	–	0	–	1	2	–	4	–	2
Rose Poly	0	–	2	–	0	0	–	8	–	0
+ – Conference co-champions

1963 Prairie College Conference football standings
	Conf.					Overall
Team	W		L		T	W		L		T
Principia $	2	–	0	–	0	6	–	2	–	1
Illinois College	1	–	1	–	0	4	–	3	–	0
Rose Poly	0	–	2	–	0	2	–	6	–	0
$ – Conference champion

1964 Prairie College Conference football standings
	Conf.					Overall
Team	W		L		T	W		L		T
Principia $	2	–	0	–	0	6	–	3	–	0
Rose Poly	1	–	1	–	0	2	–	6	–	0
Illinois College	0	–	2	–	0	4	–	4	–	0
$ – Conference champion

1965 Prairie College Conference football standings
	Conf.					Overall
Team	W		L		T	W		L		T
Illinois College +	1	–	1	–	0	6	–	2	–	0
Principia +	1	–	1	–	0	5	–	3	–	0
Rose Poly +	1	–	1	–	0	5	–	3	–	0
+ – Conference co-champions

1966 Prairie College Conference football standings
	Conf.					Overall
Team	W		L		T	W		L		T
Principia $	2	–	0	–	0	7	–	1	–	0
Rose Poly	1	–	1	–	0	3	–	4	–	1
Illinois College	0	–	2	–	0	4	–	4	–	0
$ – Conference champion

1967 Prairie College Conference football standings
	Conf.					Overall
Team	W		L		T	W		L		T
Principia $	2	–	0	–	0	4	–	3	–	1
Rose Poly	0	–	1	–	1	1	–	6	–	2
Illinois College	0	–	1	–	1	1	–	6	–	1
$ – Conference champion

== See also ==
- List of defunct college football conferences
