= George H. Pritchard =

American sports coach (1888–1960)

Biographical details
- Born: November 11, 1888; Germantown, Ohio, U.S.
- Died: August 11, 1960 (aged 71); North Little Rock, Arkansas, U.S.

Playing career

Football
- c. 1907: Northern Ohio

Basketball
- c. 1907: Northern Ohio

Basketball
- c. 1907: Northern Ohio

Basketball
- c. 1907: Northern Ohio
- Positions: Quarterback (football); Forward (basketball); Pitcher (baseball) hurdler (track and field)

Coaching career (HC unless noted)

Football
- 1911: Trinity (TX)
- 1912: Lebanon Valley
- 1913–1915: Oklahoma Methodist
- 1916–1919: Eureka
- 1920–1923: Drury
- 1924–1927: Hiram

Basketball
- 1911–1912: Trinity (TX)
- 1919–1920: Eureka
- 1920–1924: Drury
- 1924–1928: Hiram

Baseball
- 1912: Trinity (TX)
- 1913: Lebanon Valley
- 1921–1924: Drury
- 1925–1928: Hiram

Track and field
- 1920–1924: Drury

Administrative career (AD unless noted)
- 1912–1913: Lebanon Valley
- 1920–1924: Drury
- 1932–?: Southeast Missouri State

Head coaching record
- Overall: 27–80–8 (football)

George Harrison Pritchard (November 11, 1888 – August 11, 1960) was an American football, basketball, baseball, and track and field coach and college athletics administrator. He served as the head football coach at Trinity University in Waxahachie, Texas in 1911, Lebanon Valley College in Annville Township, Pennsylvania in 1912, Oklahoma Methodist University (now known as Oklahoma City University) from 1913 to 1915, Eureka College in Eureka, Illinois from 1916 to 1919, Drury College (now known as Drury University) in Springfield, Missouri from 1920 to 1923, and Hiram College in Hiram, Ohio from 1924 to 1927. In 1932, Pritchard was named athletic director at Southeast Missouri State Teachers College—now known as Southeast Missouri State University.

Pritchard was born on November 11, 1888, in Germantown, Ohio, to Charles and Elizabeth (Fogleman) Pritchard. His father had immigrated to the United States from Wales. Pritchard was raised in Ohio, and attended Ohio Northern University in Ada, Ohio, from which he graduated with a Bachelor of Science degree in 1908. At Ohio Northern, he lettered in football, basketball, baseball, and track and field. He played as a quarterback in football, a forward in basketball, and a pitcher in baseball. In track, he competed as a hurdler. He earned a Master of Arts degree from the University of Oklahoma in 1925.

Pritchard was appointed physical director at Trinity in 1911, having come from Dayton, Ohio. He coached football, basketball, and baseball at Trinity during the 1911–12 year. In 1912, Pritchard went to Lebanon Valley, where he coach the football team that fall and the baseball team the following spring. He coached at Oklahoma Methodist from 1913 to 1916, when he went to Eureka. Pritchard left Eureka in 1920 to become athletic director and coach of football, basketball, baseball, and track at Drury.

Pritchard died on August 11, 1960, at his home in North Little Rock, Arkansas.

== Head coaching record ==
=== Football ===
Year	Team	Overall	Conference	Standing	Bowl/playoffs
Trinity Tigers (Independent) (1911)
1911	Trinity	1–4–1			
Trinity:		1–4–1			
Lebanon Valley Flying Dutchmen (Independent) (1912)
1912	Lebanon Valley	4–4–1			
Lebanon Valley:		4–4–1			
Oklahoma Methodist (Independent) (1913–1915)
1913	Oklahoma Methodist	3–4			
1914	Oklahoma Methodist	1–6			
1915	Oklahoma Methodist	0–5			
Eureka:		4–15			
Eureka Red Devils (Illinois Intercollegiate Athletic Conference) (1916–1919)
1916	Eureka	5–3			
1917	Eureka	3–3			
1918	Eureka	0–1–2			
1919	Eureka	3–5			
Eureka:		11–12–1			
Drury Panthers (Missouri College Athletic Union) (1920–1923)
1920	Drury	1–5	1–3	9th	
1921	Drury	2–5–1	1–4–1	T–10th	
1922	Drury	2–4–1	2–3–1	9th	
1923	Drury	1–5	1–3	T–10th	
Drury:		6–19–2	5–13–2		
Hiram Terriers (Ohio Athletic Conference) (1924–1927)
1924	Hiram	1–7	0–7	20th	
1925	Hiram	0–5–3	0–5–2	T–18th	
1926	Hiram	0–7	0–7	22nd	
1927	Hiram	0–7	0–7	22nd	
Hiram:		1–26–3	0–26–2		
Total:		27–80–8			
