= Ralph McKinzie =

American football, basketball, and baseball coach (1894–1990)

Biographical details
- Born: October 1, 1894; Winterset, Iowa, U.S.
- Died: December 7, 1990 (aged 96); Eureka, Illinois, U.S.

Playing career

Football
- 1914: Oklahoma Methdodist
- 1916–1917: Eureka
- 1919–1920: Eureka

Basketball
- c. 1916–1921: Eureka

Basketball
- c. 1916–1921: Eureka
- Positions: Fullback, Halfback (football); Guard (basketball)

Coaching career (HC unless noted)

Football
- 1921–1937: Eureka
- 1938–1939: Wartburg

Basketball
- 1921–1937: Eureka
- 1938–1940: Wartburg
- 1940–1948: Northern Illinois

Baseball
- 1945: Northern Illinois
- 1949–1956: Northern Illinois

Administrative career (AD unless noted)
- 1921–1938: Eureka
- 1938–1940: Wartburg

Head coaching record
- Overall: 36–91–11 (football); 218–211–1 (basketball); 70–90 (baseball)

Accomplishments and honors

Championships
- Baseball; 2 IIAC (1950–1951)

Ralph Clyde "Mac" McKinzie (October 1, 1894 – December 7, 1990) was an American football, basketball, and baseball coach and athletics administrator. He served as the head football coach at Eureka College in Eureka, Illinois from 1921 to 1937 and Wartburg College in Waverly, Iowa from 1938 to 1939. At Eureka, McKinzie was the football coach for Ronald Reagan, the 40th President of the United States.

McKinzie was born on October 1, 1894, in Winterset, Iowa, to John William (1860–1951) and Sarah Minnie Brassfield McKinzie (1871–1950). A native of Tonkawa, Oklahoma, McKinzie began his college career at Methodist University of Oklahoma—now known as Oklahoma City University—on a football scholarship. In 1916, he transferred to Eureka College, where he played football as a fullback in 1916, 1917, 1919, and 1920. He also earned four varsity letters in basketball and three in baseball. He was twice elected captain of the football teams and once as captain of the baseball team. McKinzie served with the United States Army from 1918 to 1919, and was wounded in France.

McKinzie received a Master of Arts degree from University of Iowa. The same year, he left Eureka to become athletic director and coach at Wartburg.

McKinzie died on December 7, 1990, at Maple Lawn Nursing Home in Eureka. In 1933, Eureka College named its football field, McKinzie Field, after him.

== Head coaching record ==
=== Football ===
Year	Team	Overall	Conference	Standing	Bowl/playoffs
Eureka Red Devils (Illinois Intercollegiate Athletic Conference) (1921–1937)
1921	Eureka	5–2			
1922	Eureka	5–3	4–3		
1923	Eureka	4–4	4–4	T–10th	
1924	Eureka	3–4–1	3–4–1	12th	
1925	Eureka	5–4	5–4	11th	
1926	Eureka	0–6–1	0–6–1	21st	
1927	Eureka	0–9	0–9	21st	
1928	Eureka	3–4–1	3–4–1	12th	
1929	Eureka	3–3–2	3–3–2	T–12th	
1930	Eureka	2–6	2–6	18th	
1931	Eureka	3–4–1	2–4–1	T–15th	
1932	Eureka	1–4–1	1–3–1	T–15th	
1933	Eureka	0–7	0–7	21st	
1934	Eureka	0–3–2	0–3–2	T–16th	
1935	Eureka	0–6	0–6	20th	
1936	Eureka	2–5–1	2–5–1	17th	
1937	Eureka	0–6	0–6	20th	
Eureka:		36–80–10			
Wartburg Knights (Iowa Intercollegiate Athletic Conference) (1938–1939)
1938	Wartburg	0–6	0–5	13th	
1939	Wartburg	0–5–1	0–4–1	T–12th	
Wartburg:		0–11–1	0–9–1		
Total:		36–91–11			
