= John Peffers =

American lawyer and politician (1878–1936)

John M. Peffers (April 28, 1878 – November 29, 1936) was an American lawyer and politician.

== Biography ==
Peffers was born in Eureka, Illinois. He graduated from East Aurora High School in Aurora, Illinois, in 1896. Peffers was admitted to the Illinois bar in 1902 and practiced law in Aurora. He served as secretary to United States Senator Albert J. Hopkins of Illinois for seven years. Peffers served in the Illinois House of Representatives from 1925 until his death in 1936. He was a Republican. Peffers died from a heart attack at his home in Aurora, Illinois. His wife was Maud N. Peffers, who was elected to replace her husband in the Illinois General Assembly.
