= Washington Community High School =

Public high school in Washington, Illinois, United States

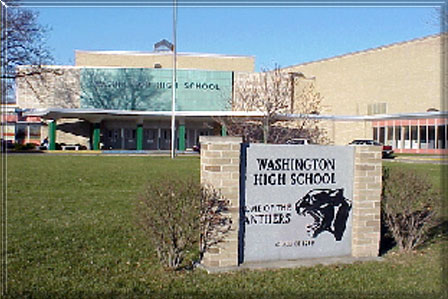

Location
- 115 Bondurant Street; Washington, Tazewell County, Illinois 61571; United States

Information
- School type: public
- School district: 308
- Superintendent: Kyle Freeman
- Teaching staff: 86.00 (FTE)
- Grades: 9-12
- Gender: Coed
- Enrollment: 1,451 (2023-2024)
- Average class size: 16 Students
- Student to teacher ratio: 16.87
- Hours in school day: Normal: 7 Hours / Optional 8th Hour in Morning
- Campus type: Closed Campus
- Colors: Orange and black
- Song: Loyalty
- Athletics: http://il.8to18.com/washingtonhs/
- Athletics conference: Mid-Illini Conference
- Team name: Panthers
- Rival: Metamora Township High School
- Newspaper: The Advocate
- Graduates: 88% Graduation Rate
- Website: www.wacohi.net

Washington Community High School (WCHS) is a public high school located in Washington, Illinois. The district, Washington Community High School District 308, was first chartered in 1920, but the current high school on Bondurant Street was opened in 1942 with an enrollment of 230. As of 2017 there are 1359 students enrolled at WCHS.

The 1950s to 1970s saw rapid expansion in the student body and in campus development. The additions made in 1956, 1961, and 1962 tripled the size of the original building. During 1974 and 1975 the James Ashbrook building and new library were added. In 1977 the size of the student body reached 1720 students. In 2010 a multi-million bond ticket was passed to add the now brand new Multi-Purpose Room in the old teachers parking lot, thus connecting the main building, Ashbrook Tech and Torry Gym together, eliminating the need for students wearing PE uniforms to have to walk outside in the dead of winter with a t-shirt and shorts. A new addition to the building has been constructed, and has brought in dedicated section for the music departments, In short a new band and choir room.

== Sports ==
The school's mascot is the panther and the school colors are orange and black. The school has many sports teams, including baseball, football, boys' and girls' basketball, boys' and girls' lacrosse, girls' volleyball, softball, golf, soccer, tennis, cross country, wrestling, cheerleader, boys' and girls' swimming, and boys' and girls' track, as well as other competitive activities such as marching band and scholastic bowl with the recent addition of a bass fishing team, a skeet/trap shooting team, and an Esports team.

In 1977, the girls' basketball team finished second to Sterling High School in the first girls' state basketball tournament in Illinois. In 2007, the boys' baseball team won the Mid-Illini Conference championship for the first time in school history while placing third in the state in Class AA. It was the first state appearance for baseball. In 1985, the football team won the Class 4A state championship with a final record of 13 wins and 1 loss. This followed a second-place finish in 4A in 1983. The boys basketball team finished fourth in the state Class 3A tournament in 2008. The wrestling team finished as state runners-up in the 2014-2015 season with a school-record 3 state champions, 6 state finalists, and 7 state placers. The wrestling team won back to back 2A dual team state titles in 2016 and 2017.

Boys' basketball alumnus Alec Peters played for Valparaiso University and was a second-round selection in the 2017 NBA draft.

== Journalism program ==
Prior to the 2009-2010 school year, the school newspaper, the Advocate, was advised by Michael Kenneth Blair. He died in December 2008. His family started a scholarship fund, the Michael Kenneth Blair Memorial Journalism Scholarship. Each year, this scholarship is given to a graduating senior who is planning to major in journalism, English or education.

For the 2009-2010 school year, WCHS implemented its first ever journalism class, Journalism 1. Students learn about journalism and also produce the school's monthly newspaper, the Advocate, which had previously been produced by an extracurricular club. A Journalism 2 class started in the fall of 2010. In 2014 WCHS received the prestigious Pacemaker award.

The journalism team won back to back sectional titles in 2016 and 2017 at the IHSA journalism competition at Illinois State University.

== Notable alumni ==
- Mason McCoy, baseball player
- Alec Peters, basketball player
- Colton Underwood, reality television personality and former football player
- Andrew Werner, baseball coach and former baseball pitcher

== Music programs ==
As a music department, WCHS captured 7 IHSA Music Sweepstakes State Championships between 2014 and 2024.

The new band and choir room was completed by August 2019.

The Washington Marching Panthers won Grand Champions at the University of Illinois Marching Band Competition in 2022 and received the Governor’s Trophy. This was the first time in WCHS history that this had been achieved.
