= Gateway Conference (1962–1975) =

The Gateway Conference was an intercollegiate athletic conference that existed from 1962 and 1975. Its membership included schools located in the states of Illinois and Wisconsin. The formation of the Gateway Conference was announced in December 1961 with eight member schools: Eureka College in Eureka, Illinois, George Williams College in Chicago, Lakeland College—now known as Lakeland University—in Plymouth, Wisconsin, Milton College in Milton, Wisconsin, Northwestern College—which later merged into Martin Luther College—in Watertown, Wisconsin, Shimer College in Mount Carroll, Illinois, Trinity Christian College in Palos Heights, Illinois, and the University of Illinois—Navy Pier—now known as the University of Illinois at Chicago.

== Football champions ==
- 1962 – Lakeland and Milton
- 1963 – Northwestern (WI)
- 1964 – Milton
- 1965 – Northwestern (WI)
- 1966 – Milton
- 1967 – Lakeland
- 1968 – Lakeland
- 1969 – Lakeland
- 1970 – Lakeland
- 1971 – Lakeland
- 1972 – Northland and Northwestern (WI)
- 1973 – Northland
- 1974 – Lakeland and Northland

== Basketball champions ==
- 1974–75 – Lakeland and Milton

== Yearly football standings ==
1962 Gateway Conference football standings
	Conf.					Overall
Team	W		L		T	W		L		T
Milton +	3	–	1	–	0	5	–	1	–	0
Lakeland +	3	–	1	–	0	5	–	3	–	0
Illinois–Chicago	2	–	1	–	0	4	–	2	–	2
Northwestern (WI)	1	–	2	–	0	?	–	?	–	?
Eureka	0	–	4	–	0	1	–	6	–	0
+ – Conference co-champions

1963 Gateway Conference football standings
	Conf.					Overall
Team	W		L		T	W		L		T
Northwestern (WI) $	3	–	1	–	0	?	–	?	–	?
Milton	2	–	1	–	1	6	–	2	–	0
Lakeland	2	–	1	–	1	3	–	6	–	0
Illinois–Chicago	2	–	2	–	0	?	–	?	–	?
Eureka	0	–	4	–	0	0	–	7	–	0
$ – Conference champion; Lakeland and Milton split two head-to-head games, which counted as a tie for both teams in the conference standings.

1964 Gateway Conference football standings
	Conf.					Overall
Team	W		L		T	W		L		T
Milton $	4	–	0	–	0	6	–	2	–	0
Northwestern (WI)	3	–	1	–	0	4	–	2	–	0
Illinois–Chicago	2	–	2	–	0	3	–	5	–	0
Lakeland	1	–	3	–	0	1	–	7	–	0
Eureka	0	–	4	–	0	0	–	7	–	0
$ – Conference champion

1965 Gateway Conference football standings
	Conf.					Overall
Team	W		L		T	W		L		T
Northwestern (WI) $	4	–	0	–	0	6	–	1	–	0
Milton	3	–	1	–	0	4	–	3	–	0
Lakeland	2	–	2	–	0	5	–	3	–	0
Illinois–Chicago	1	–	3	–	0	1	–	7	–	0
Eureka	0	–	4	–	0	1	–	7	–	0
$ – Conference champion

1966 Gateway Conference football standings
	Conf.					Overall
Team	W		L		T	W		L		T
Milton $	3	–	0	–	0	5	–	4	–	0
Northwestern (WI)	2	–	1	–	0	3	–	5	–	0
Lakeland	1	–	2	–	0	3	–	6	–	0
Eureka	0	–	3	–	0	0	–	7	–	0
$ – Conference champion

1967 Gateway Conference football standings
	Conf.					Overall
Team	W		L		T	W		L		T
Lakeland $	4	–	0	–	0	8	–	1	–	0
St. Procopius	3	–	1	–	0	4	–	4	–	0
Milton	2	–	2	–	0	2	–	6	–	0
Northwestern (WI)	1	–	3	–	0	1	–	7	–	0
Eureka	0	–	4	–	0	1	–	7	–	0
$ – Conference champion

1968 Gateway Conference football standings
	Conf.					Overall
Team	W		L		T	W		L		T
Lakeland $	4	–	0	–	0	7	–	2	–	0
Milton	3	–	1	–	0	?	–	?	–	?
Eureka	2	–	2	–	0	2	–	5	–	1
Northwestern (WI)	1	–	3	–	0	?	–	?	–	?
St. Procopius	0	–	4	–	0	2	–	6	–	0
$ – Conference champion

1969 Gateway Conference football standings
	Conf.					Overall
Team	W		L		T	W		L		T
Lakeland $	4	–	0	–	0	8	–	1	–	0
Milton	3	–	1	–	0	?	–	?	–	?
Northwestern (WI)	1	–	3	–	0	?	–	?	–	?
Eureka	1	–	3	–	0	1	–	7	–	0
St. Procopius	1	–	3	–	0	1	–	7	–	0
$ – Conference champion

1970 Gateway Conference football standings
	Conf.					Overall
Team	W		L		T	W		L		T
Lakeland $	3	–	0	–	0	6	–	3	–	0
Northland	2	–	0	–	0	?	–	?	–	?
St. Procopius	2	–	1	–	0	6	–	3	–	0
Northwestern (WI)	1	–	3	–	0	?	–	?	–	?
Milton	0	–	4	–	0	0	–	7	–	1
$ – Conference champion

1971 Gateway Conference football standings
	Conf.					Overall
Team	W		L		T	W		L		T
Lakeland $	3	–	0	–	0	6	–	3	–	1
Milton	2	–	1	–	0	5	–	4	–	0
Northland	1	–	2	–	0	4	–	4	–	0
Northwestern (WI)	0	–	3	–	0	0	–	7	–	0
$ – Conference champion

1972 Gateway Conference football standings
	Conf.					Overall
Team	W		L		T	W		L		T
Northwestern (WI) +	1	–	0	–	2	4	–	2	–	2
Northland +	1	–	0	–	2	3	–	3	–	2
Lakeland	1	–	1	–	1	4	–	5	–	1
Milton	0	–	2	–	1	4	–	5	–	1
$ – Conference champion

1973 Gateway Conference football standings
	Conf.					Overall
Team	W		L		T	W		L		T
Northland $	3	–	0	–	0	7	–	2	–	0
Lakeland	2	–	1	–	0	6	–	3	–	0
Milton	1	–	2	–	0	3	–	5	–	0
Northwestern (WI)	0	–	3	–	0	2	–	6	–	0
$ – Conference champion

1974 Gateway Conference football standings
	Conf.					Overall
Team	W		L		T	W		L		T
Northland +	2	–	1	–	0	?	–	?	–	0
Lakeland +	2	–	1	–	0	6	–	3	–	0
Milton	1	–	2	–	0	5	–	4	–	0
Northwestern (WI)	1	–	2	–	0	?	–	?	–	0
$ – Conference champion

== See also ==
- List of defunct college football conferences
