= St. Louis Intercollegiate Athletic Conference =

NCAA Division III athletic conference

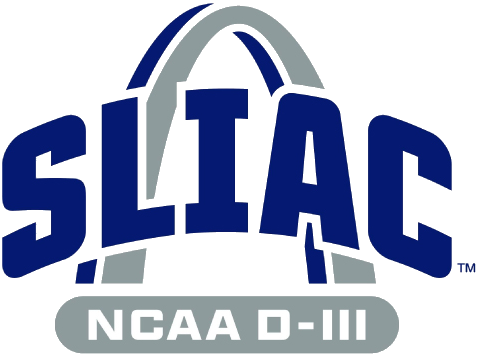
- Association: NCAA
- Founded: 1989; 37 years ago
- Commissioner: Dr. Dick Kaiser
- Sports fielded: 14; men's: 7; women's: 7
- Division: Division III
- No. of teams: 9
- Headquarters: St. Louis, Missouri
- Region: Midwest and South
- Website: sliac.org

Locations
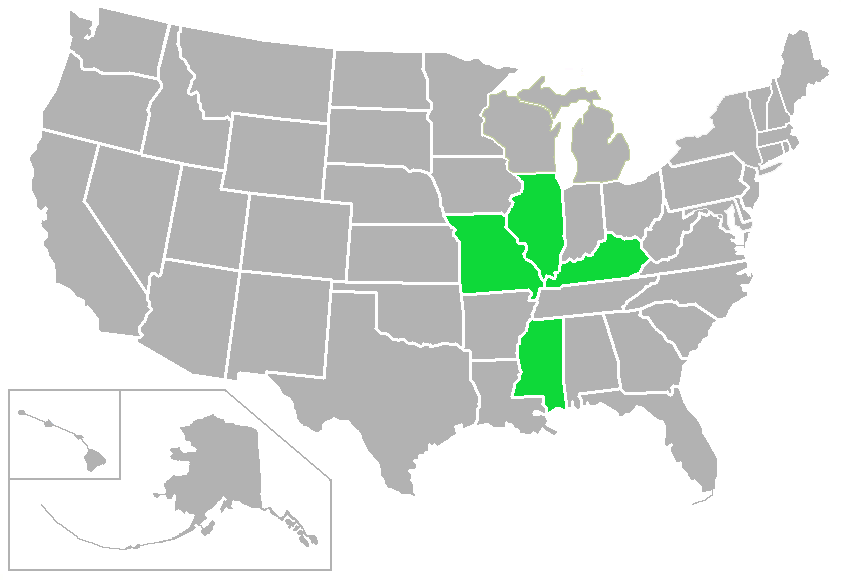

The St. Louis Intercollegiate Athletic Conference (SLIAC) is an intercollegiate athletic conference that competes in the National Collegiate Athletic Association (NCAA) Division III which is located in the Midwestern and Southern United States. There are 9 full member institutions as of the 2025–26 academic year.

St. Louis Intercollegiate Athletic Conference
Location of SLIAC members: full member

== History ==
Historic logo

=== Key milestones ===
- February 1991: The first SLIAC men's basketball tournament is held.
- February 1995: Westminster wins the men's basketball tournament title to earn the SLIAC's first automatic bid to an NCAA Division III national championship event.
- March 1996: MacMurray wins the women's basketball tournament title to earn the conference's first automatic bid to an NCAA Division III women's national championship event.
- November 1996: Blackburn, MacMurray, and Westminster share the first-ever SLIAC football title.
- September 1999: The SLIAC begins its tenth year of operation.
- November 1999: The fourth and final (until 2008) conference football title is awarded (six teams needed for conference to sponsor a sport).
- May 2007: William Wolper hired as the Conference's first full-time Commissioner (officially started in July).
- September 2008: Football begins play as the 13th conference sport after a nine-year hiatus.
- April 2009: The SLIAC announced it would cease its sponsorship of football; five football-playing schools join the Upper Midwest Athletic Conference (UMAC) as associate members for the sport. Huntingdon and LaGrange end football affiliation with the conference.

=== Recent events ===
On April 16, 2009, the SLIAC announced it would cease its sponsorship of football; five football-playing schools join the Upper Midwest Athletic Conference (UMAC) as associate members for the sport. Huntingdon and LaGrange ended their football affiliation with the conference.

On June 9, 2020, Iowa Wesleyan University announced that it would leave the NCAA and return to the National Association of Intercollegiate Athletics (NAIA) after the 2020–21 academic year.

On June 17, 2021, Mississippi University for Women (MUW) was admitted to join the SLIAC as a full member, beginning the 2023–24 academic year.

On August 22, 2022, Lyon College was admitted to join the SLIAC as a full member, beginning the 2023–24 academic year.

=== Chronological timeline ===
- 1989 – In September 1989, the St. Louis Intercollegiate Athletic Conference (SLIAC) was founded. Charter members included Blackburn College of Illinois, Fontbonne College (later Fontbonne University), Maryville College of the Sacred Heart (now Maryville University), Parks College, Principia College and Webster University, beginning the 1989–90 academic year.
- 1990 – MacMurray College and Westminster College of Missouri joined the SLIAC in the 1990–91 academic year; also conference competition for all sports began along the way.
- 1995 – Greenville University joined the SLIAC in the 1995 86 academic year.
- 1996 – Parks left the SLIAC after the 1995–96 academic year; as it ceased operations and its academic programs were moved to the Saint Louis University campus.
- 2006 – Eureka College and Lincoln Christian College (later Lincoln Christian University) joined the SLIAC in the 2006–07 academic year.
- 2007 – Lincoln Christian left the SLIAC at the end of the fall 2007 semester, during the 2007–08 academic year.
- 2008 – Huntingdon College and LaGrange College joined the SLIAC as affiliate members for football in the 2008 fall season (2008–09 academic year); as the conference announced the return of football after a nine-year hiatus.
- 2009:
  - Huntingdon and LaGrange left the SLIAC as affiliate members for football after the 2008 fall season (2008–09 academic year).
  - Spalding University joined the SLIAC in the 2009–10 academic year.
- 2010 – The University of Dallas joined the SLIAC as an affiliate member for men's golf and men's and women's cross country in the 2010–11 academic year.
- 2011 – U. of Dallas left the SLIAC as an affiliate member for men's golf (after spending one season) to join as a full member of the Southern Collegiate Athletic Conference (SCAC) after the 2010–11 academic year.
- 2013 – Iowa Wesleyan College (later Iowa Wesleyan University) joined the SLIAC in the 2013–14 academic year.
- 2019 – Grinnell College, Illinois College, Knox College of Illinois, Lake Forest College and Monmouth College joined the SLIAC as affiliate members for men's and women's golf in the 2019–20 academic year.
- 2020 – MacMurray left the SLIAC after the 2019–20 academic year; as the school ceased operations due to financial struggles.
- 2021 – Iowa Wesleyan left the SLIAC and the NCAA to return to the National Association of Intercollegiate Athletics (NAIA) as an Independent within the Association of Independent Institutions (AII) after the 2020–21 academic year.
- 2023:
  - Lyon College and the Mississippi University for Women (MUW) joined the SLIAC in the 2023–24 academic year.
  - The University of the Ozarks and Schreiner University joined the SLIAC as affiliate members for men's and women's wrestling in the 2023–24 academic year.
- 2025:
  - Fontbonne left the SLIAC after the 2024–25 academic year; as the school ceased operations.
  - McMurry University joined the SLIAC as an affiliate member for men's and women's wrestling (alongside Huntingdon returning for those sports) in the 2025–26 academic year.

== Member schools ==
=== Current members ===
The SLIAC currently has nine full members; all but one are private schools:

Institution	Location	Founded	Affiliation	Enrollment	Nickname	Colors	Varsity teams	Joined (Note: Represents the calendar year when fall sports competition begins.)
Blackburn College	Carlinville, Illinois	1837	Presbyterian (PCUSA)	382	Beavers		12	1989 (Note: Charter member. But SLIAC competition for all sports began in the 1990–91 school year.)
Eureka College	Eureka, Illinois	1855	Disciples of Christ	559	Red Devils		16	2006
Greenville University	Greenville, Illinois	1892	Free Methodist	1,088	Panthers		14	1995
Lyon College	Batesville, Arkansas	1872	Presbyterian (PCUSA)	496	Scots		21	2023
Mississippi University for Women (MUW)	Columbus, Mississippi	1884	Public	2,339	Owls		17	2023
Principia College	Elsah, Illinois	1912	Scientist	323	Panthers		12	1989
Spalding University	Louisville, Kentucky	1814	Catholic (S.C.N.)	1,692	Golden Eagles		11	2009
Webster University	Webster Groves, Missouri	1915	Catholic (Sisters of Loretto)	5,000	Gorloks		11	1989
Westminster College	Fulton, Missouri	1851	Presbyterian (PCUSA)	610	Blue Jays		8	1990

=== Affiliate members ===
The SLIAC has nine affiliate members, all are private schools:

Institution	Location	Founded	Affiliation	Enrollment	Nickname	Joined (Note: Represents the calendar year when fall sports competition begins.)	SLIAC sport(s)	Primary conference
Grinnell College	Grinnell, Iowa	1846	Nonsectarian	1,638	Pioneers	2019	Men's golf	Midwest (MWC)
Grinnell College	Grinnell, Iowa	1846	Nonsectarian	1,638	Pioneers	2019	Women's golf	Midwest (MWC)
Huntingdon College	Montgomery, Alabama	1854	United Methodist	900	Hawks	2025	Men's wrestling	USA South
Huntingdon College	Montgomery, Alabama	1854	United Methodist	900	Hawks	2025	Women's wrestling	USA South
Illinois College	Jacksonville, Illinois	1829	UCC & PCUSA	1,029	Blueboys & Lady Blues	2019	Men's golf	Midwest (MWC)
Illinois College	Jacksonville, Illinois	1829	UCC & PCUSA	1,029	Blueboys & Lady Blues	2019	Women's golf	Midwest (MWC)
Knox College	Galesburg, Illinois	1837	Nonsectarian	1,058	Prairie Fire	2019	Men's golf	Midwest (MWC)
Knox College	Galesburg, Illinois	1837	Nonsectarian	1,058	Prairie Fire	2019	Women's golf	Midwest (MWC)
Lake Forest College	Lake Forest, Illinois	1857	Nonsectarian	1,395	Foresters	2019	Men's golf	Midwest (MWC)
Lake Forest College	Lake Forest, Illinois	1857	Nonsectarian	1,395	Foresters	2019	Women's golf	Midwest (MWC)
McMurry University	Abilene, Texas	1923	United Methodist	1,430	War Hawks	2025	Men's wrestling	Southern (SCAC)
McMurry University	Abilene, Texas	1923	United Methodist	1,430	War Hawks	2025	Women's wrestling	Southern (SCAC)
Monmouth College	Monmouth, Illinois	1853	Presbyterian (PCUSA)	767	Fighting Scots	2019	Men's golf	Midwest (MWC)
Monmouth College	Monmouth, Illinois	1853	Presbyterian (PCUSA)	767	Fighting Scots	2019	Women's golf	Midwest (MWC)
University of the Ozarks	Clarksville, Arkansas	1834	Presbyterian	630	Eagles	2023	Men's wrestling	Southern (SCAC)
University of the Ozarks	Clarksville, Arkansas	1834	Presbyterian	630	Eagles	2025	Women's wrestling	Southern (SCAC)
Schreiner University	Kerrville, Texas	1923	Presbyterian	1,103	Mountaineers	2023	Men's wrestling	Southern (SCAC)
Schreiner University	Kerrville, Texas	1923	Presbyterian	1,103	Mountaineers	2025	Women's wrestling	Southern (SCAC)

=== Former members ===
The SLIAC had six former full members; all were private schools. Only one remains in operation as a standalone institution.

Institution	Location	Founded	Affiliation	Enrollment	Nickname	Varsity teams	Joined (Note: Represents the calendar year when fall sports competition begins.)	Left (Note: Represents the calendar year when spring sports competition ends.)	Current conference
Fontbonne University	Clayton, Missouri	1923	Catholic (C.S.J.)	944	Griffins	10	1989 (Note: Charter member. But SLIAC competition for all sports began in the 1990–91 school year.)	2025	Closed in 2025
Iowa Wesleyan University	Mount Pleasant, Iowa	1842	United Methodist	571	Tigers	12	2013	2021	Closed in 2023
Lincoln Christian University	Lincoln, Illinois	1944	Christian Churches and Churches of Christ	1,000	Red Lions (Note: Lincoln Christian's former athletic nicknames were the Preachers (men's) and the Angels (women's).)	10	2006	2008 (Note: Lincoln Christian left the SLIAC after the end of the 2007 fall season without completing the rest of the 2007–08 school year.)	Closed in 2024
MacMurray College	Jacksonville, Illinois	1846	United Methodist	683	Highlanders	10	1990	2020	Closed in 2020
Maryville University	Town and Country, Missouri (Note: The campus mailing address is St. Louis.)	1872	Catholic (R.S.C.J.)	2,500	Saints	14	1989	2009	Great Lakes Valley (GLVC) (Note: Currently an NCAA Division II athletic conference.)
Parks College	Cahokia, Illinois (Note: Parks College's academic programs were moved to Saint Louis University main campus in August 1996.)	1927	Catholic (Jesuit)	N/A	Falcons	N/A	1989	1996	N/A (Note: Parks discontinued its athletics program after the 1995–96 school year, and ceased to be a separate college in 2022, although it continues as a department within Saint Louis University)

=== Former affiliate members ===
The SLIAC had three former affiliate members, all were private schools:

Institution	Location	Founded	Affiliation	Enrollment	Nickname	Joined (Note: Represents the calendar year when fall sports competition begins.)	Left (Note: Represents the calendar year when spring sports competition ends.)	SLIAC sport(s)	Primary conference
University of Dallas	Irving, Texas	1956	Catholic	3,500	Crusaders	2010	2011	Men's cross country	Southern (SCAC)
University of Dallas	Irving, Texas	1956	Catholic	3,500	Crusaders	2010	2011	Women's cross country	Southern (SCAC)
University of Dallas	Irving, Texas	1956	Catholic	3,500	Crusaders	2010	2011	Men's golf	Southern (SCAC)
Huntingdon College	Montgomery, Alabama	1854	United Methodist	900	Hawks	2008	2009	Football	USA South
LaGrange College	LaGrange, Georgia	1831	United Methodist	1,137	Panthers	2008	2009	Football	USA South

=== Membership timeline ===
Full member (all sports) Full member (non-football) Associate member (football) Associate member (sport)

== Sports ==
The SLIAC sponsors intercollegiate athletic competition in the following sports:

Conference sports
Sport	Men's	Women's
Baseball	Yes	No
Basketball	Yes	Yes
Cross country	Yes	Yes
Golf	Yes	Yes
Soccer	Yes	Yes
Softball	No	Yes
Track and field	Yes	Yes
Volleyball	No	Yes
Wrestling	Yes	Yes
