= Illini–Badger Football Conference =

Former collegiate American football conference

The Illini–Badger Football Conference (IBFC) was an athletic conference with the NCAA's Division III. Member teams were located in Illinois and Wisconsin. As the name indicates, member teams only competed in football. They participated in other athletic conferences in other sports. The conference's last season was in 2007.

In 1989, the conference changed its name to the Illini–Badger–Hawkeye Football Conference and added four new members: Blackburn College in Carlinville, Illinois, Greenville College—now known as Greenville University—in Greenville, Illinois, MacMurray College in Jacksonville, Illinois, and Iowa Wesleyan College—later known as Iowa Wesleyan University—in Mount Pleasant, Iowa.

== Member teams during final season ==
- Aurora University
- Benedictine University
- Concordia University Chicago
- Concordia University Wisconsin
- Eureka College
- Greenville College
- Lakeland College
- MacMurray College

== Former members ==
- Iowa Wesleyan College (1989–1992)
- Milton College (1976–1982)
- Northeastern Illinois University (1976–1988)
- Principia College (1989–1992)
- Quincy University (1993–1996)

== Conference champions ==
- 1975 – Milton
- 1976 – Milton
- 1977 – Northeastern Illinois
- 1978 – Milton
- 1979 – Lakeland
- 1980 – Milton
- 1981 – Concordia (WI), Milton & Northeastern Illinois
- 1982 – Northeastern Illinois
- 1983 – Concordia (IL)
- 1984 – Northeastern Illinois
- 1985 – Lakeland
- 1986 – Lakeland
- 1987 – Concordia (IL)
- 1988 – Concordia (WI)
- 1989 – Greenville
- 1990 – Concordia (WI)
- 1991 – Eureka
- 1992 – Greenville
- 1993 – Quincy
- 1994 – Quincy
- 1995 – Eureka
- 1996 – Lakeland
- 1997 – Lakeland
- 1998 – Aurora
- 1999 – Aurora
- 2000 – Aurora
- 2001 – MacMurray
- 2002 – MacMurray
- 2003 – Concordia (WI)
- 2004 – Aurora, Concordia (WI) & Lakeland
- 2005 – Lakeland
- 2006 – Concordia (WI)
- 2007 – Concordia (WI) & Lakeland

== See also ==
- Lake Michigan Conference
- Northern Illinois-Iowa Conference
- St. Louis Intercollegiate Athletic Conference
- Northern Athletics Conference
