= Eureka College =

Private liberal arts college in Eureka, Illinois, US

- Motto: The Moment of Discovery
- Type: Private college
- Established: February 6, 1855; 171 years ago
- Religious affiliation: Christian Church (Disciples of Christ)
- Endowment: $16.2 million
- President: Jamel Wright
- Students: 559 (fall 2023)
- Location: Eureka, Illinois, U.S. 40°42′50″N 89°16′03″W
- Campus: 112 acres (45 ha); Rural
- Colors: Maroon and gold
- Nickname: Red Devils
- Sporting affiliations: NCAA Division III – SLIAC
- Website: eureka.edu

Eureka College is a private college in Eureka, Illinois, United States. Founded in 1855, it is related by covenant to the Christian Church (Disciples of Christ). The college enrolled approximately 559 students in 2023.

Eureka College was founded by abolitionists and was the third college in the United States to admit men and women on an equal basis. In 1856, future U.S. president Abraham Lincoln spoke on campus. Ronald Reagan, the 40th U.S. president, graduated from Eureka College in 1932 and maintained a close connection with the college throughout his life; it is home to the Ronald Reagan Museum and Peace Garden.

== History ==
The college was founded in 1848 by a group of abolitionists who had left Kentucky because of their opposition to slavery and was originally named the Walnut Grove Academy. It was chartered in 1855.

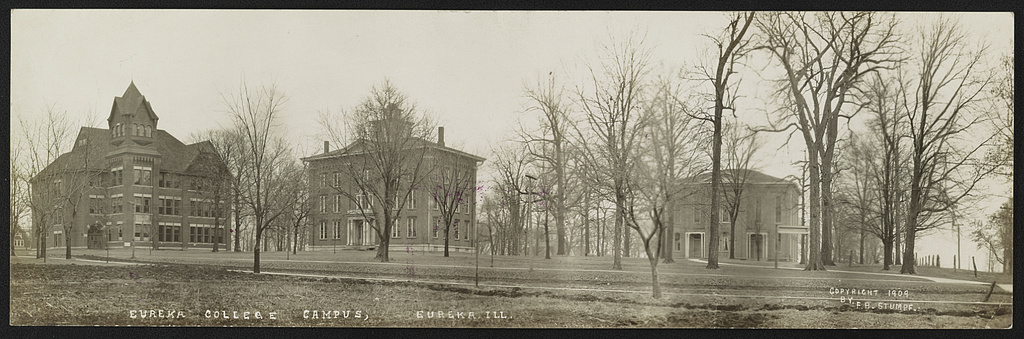
Eureka College campus in 1909

When the school was founded, it was the first school in Illinois (and only the third in the United States) to educate women on an equal basis with men. In 1856, Abraham Lincoln spoke on campus, making Eureka one of only three colleges where Lincoln spoke. Abingdon College merged with Eureka in 1885.

In 2010, Eureka College was designated as a national historic district by the National Park Service.

On March 27, 2009, the former leader of the Soviet Union, Mikhail Gorbachev, visited the section of the Berlin Wall on display in the Reagan Peace Garden on campus. Eureka gave President Gorbachev an honorary degree during a convocation in which students asked the former Soviet leader questions. The college granted Nancy Reagan an honorary degree in 2009 at a private ceremony in the Ronald Reagan Presidential Library in Simi Valley, California.

As part of the Ronald Reagan Centennial Celebration in 2011, former Speaker of the U.S. House of Representatives Newt Gingrich delivered the commencement address at Eureka. The same year saw the opening of the Mark R. Shenkman Reagan Research Center and College Archives; the center is collecting and maintaining every book and doctoral dissertation written about Ronald Reagan.

James A. Baker III was named Honorary Reagan Fellow in 2012, and this honor was bestowed on Justice Sandra Day O'Connor the next year. George P. Shultz, former U.S. Secretary of State, received was made an Honorary Reagan Fellow at a ceremony in San Francisco in 2014.

== Campus ==
- Eureka College Administration and Chapel
- U.S. National Register of Historic Places
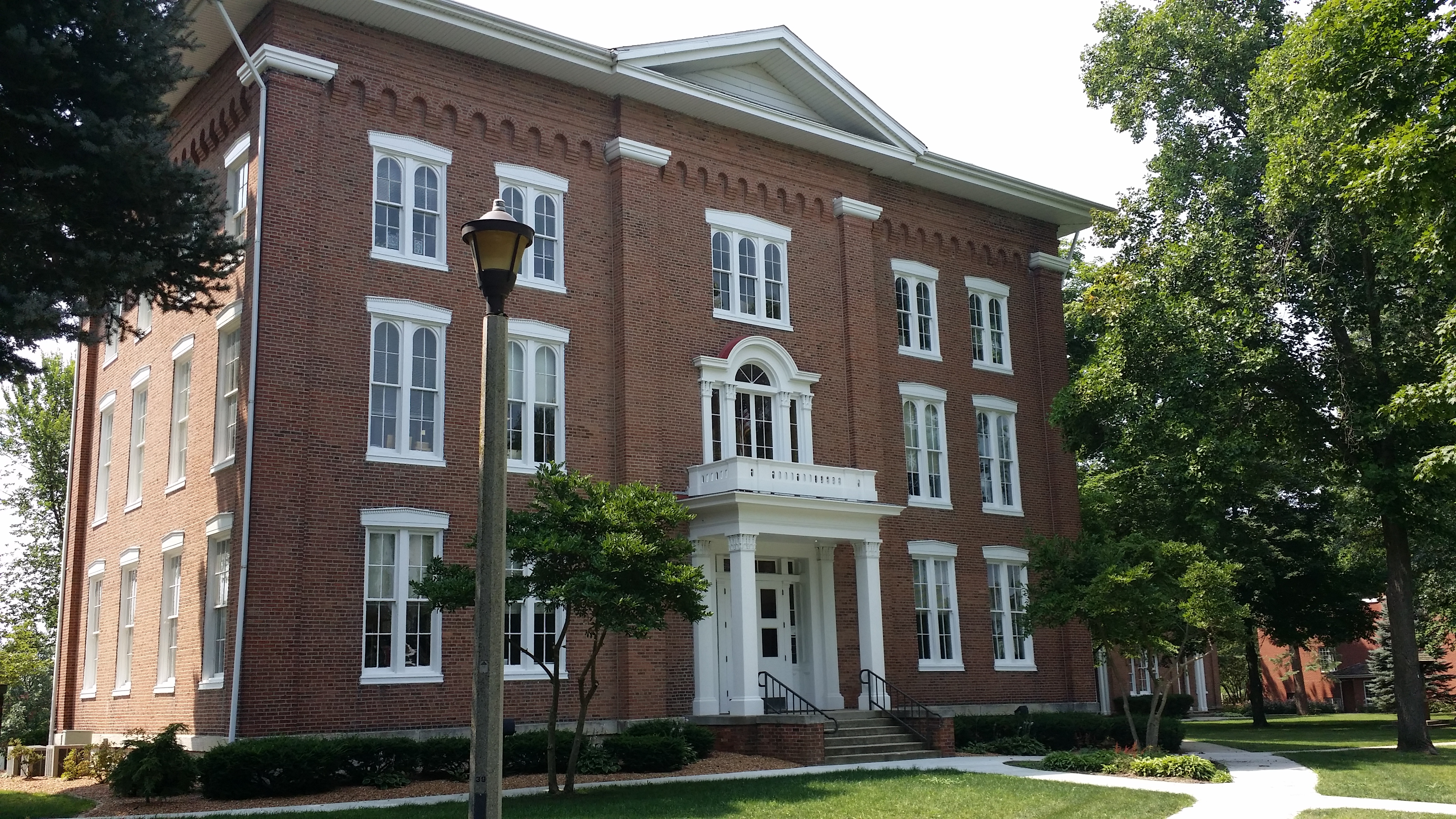
- Administration Building

- Location within Illinois
- Location: 300 College Ave. Eureka, Illinois
- Coordinates: 40°42′50″N 89°16′09″W
- Area: 2.8 acres (1.1 ha)
- Built: 1858
- Architectural style: Italianate, Georgian, Federal
- NRHP reference No.: 80001426
- Added to NRHP: May 31, 1980

The Eureka College campus is 112 acres (0.45 km^{2}). Burrus Dickinson Hall, the college's administration building, is on the National Register of Historic Places, as is the college chapel.

The Ronald Reagan Museum and Peace Gardens, located within the Donald B. Cerf Center, contains a collection of objects and memorabilia largely donated by Reagan. The items are from his times as a student, actor, athlete, Governor of California and President of the United States. Admission is free.

The Reagan Athletic Complex was dedicated in 1970 by brothers and alumni Neil Reagan and Ronald Reagan, and named in their honor. At Eureka's commencement exercises in 1982, President Reagan announced the START treaty proposal in the Reagan Gym. In 2015, The Bonati Fitness Center and Reagan Center Pool underwent renovation.

== Student body ==
As of fall 2023, the college enrolled 527 students split nearly evenly between men and women. Most - 68% - of the students were White, 12% were Black, 9% were Hispanic/Latino, and 1% were Asian; 3% of students reported two or more races and 5% did not report their race or ethnicity. The vast majority - 85% - were from the state of Illinois and about 1% were from outside the United States. About two-thirds - 63% - of full-time students who enrolled in the fall of 2022 returned for the fall of 2023. Of the full-time, first-time students who began their studies at Eureka in fall 2017, 41% graduated and 42% transferred to another institution.

== Greek life ==
As of 2019, 23% of male students are in social fraternities, while 26% of female students are in social sororities. Overall 24% of the student body are involved in Greek life. In February 2020, the college's chapter of Delta Sigma Phi was disciplined due to unknown allegations.

== Athletics ==
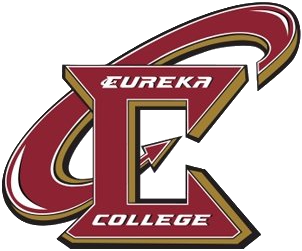
Eureka athletics logo

The Eureka athletic teams are the Red Devils. The college is a member of the Division III level of the National Collegiate Athletic Association (NCAA), primarily competing in the St. Louis Intercollegiate Athletic Conference (SLIAC) since the 2006–07 academic year. The Red Devils previously competed in the defunct Northern Illinois-Iowa Conference from about 1996–97 to 2005–06; and in the Chicagoland Collegiate Athletic Conference (CCAC) of the National Association of Intercollegiate Athletics (NAIA) until after the 1995–96 school year. Eureka was also a member of the Illinois Intercollegiate Athletic Conference (IIAC) from 1910–11 to 1941–42.

Eureka competes in 14 intercollegiate varsity sports: Men's sports include baseball, basketball, cross country, football, golf, soccer and wrestling; while women's sports include basketball, cross country, golf, soccer, softball, volleyball and wrestling.

The men's basketball team, coached by Dave Darnell, won the 1994 NAIA Division II national championship.

On September 1, 2012, Eureka College quarterback Sam Durley set an NCAA record with 736 passing yards in Eureka's 62–55 victory over Knox College.

== Notable alumni ==
Among Eureka College's alumni are forty two college and university presidents, seven governors and members of U.S. Congress, and the 40th president of the United States, Ronald Reagan, who graduated with the class of 1932. Eureka College is the smallest college or university in American history to graduate a future U.S. president with a bachelor's degree.

=== Ronald Reagan ===
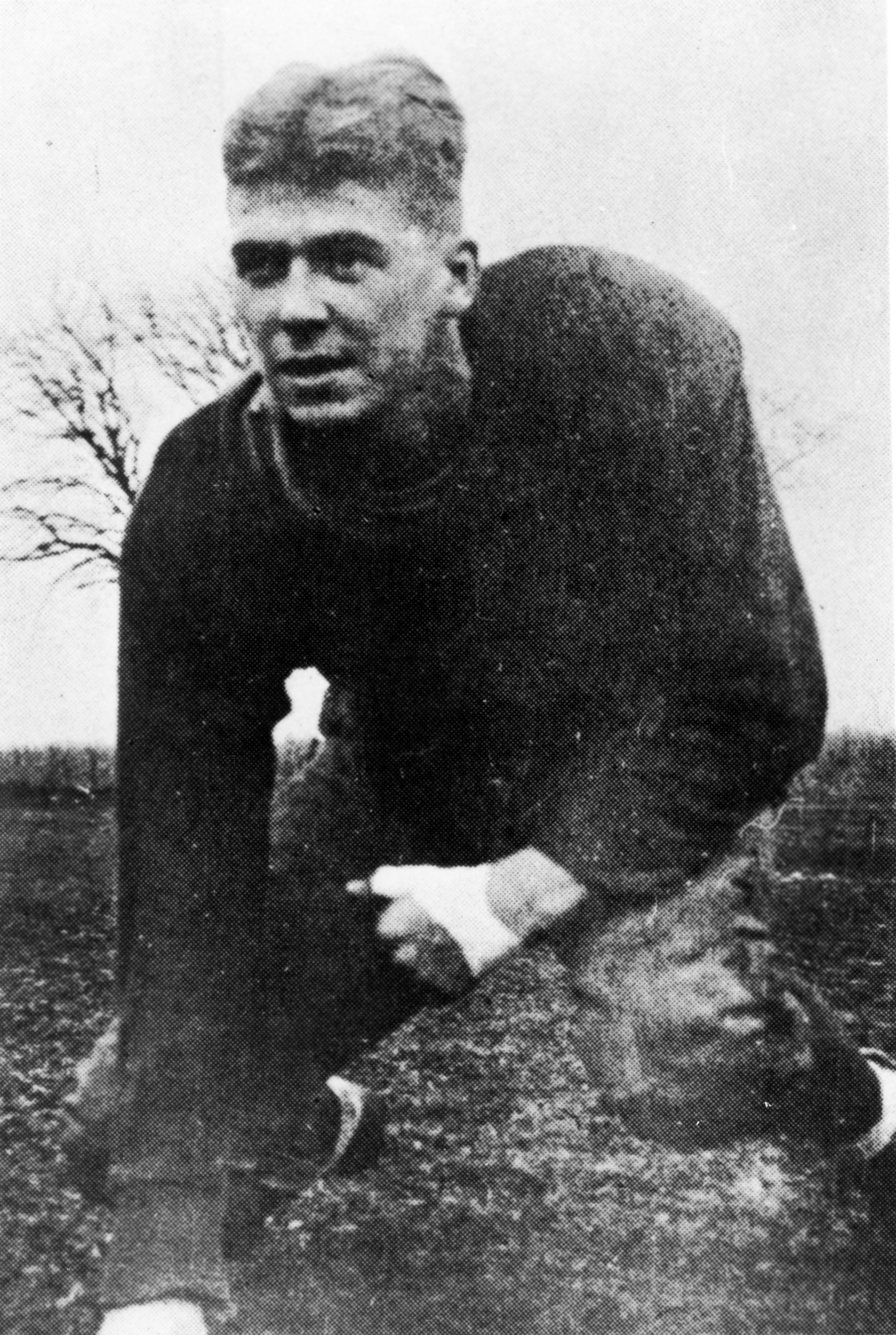
Ronald Reagan on the Eureka College football team, 1929

Reagan's relationship with his alma mater began in 1928 when he entered as a freshman from Dixon, Illinois, at age 17. Following his graduation on June 10, 1932, with a joint major in economics and sociology, Reagan returned for visits on twelve recorded occasions. He served on the board of trustees for three terms, stayed connected to his fraternity Tau Kappa Epsilon, communicated with his football coach and mentor Ralph "Mac" McKinzie, and helped support fund-raising drives including with his own contributions to the college. Reagan gave commencement addresses at Eureka College in 1952, 1957, 1982 and 1992.

He dedicated the Melick Library building in 1967 and the Reagan Physical Education Center in 1970. When he died in 2004, Eureka College was one of three officially designated recipients of memorial gifts by his family. In 1982, Reagan told the Eureka College audience, "Everything that has been good in my life began here."

Eureka College established the Ronald W. Reagan Leadership Program in 1982 to provide scholarships and four-year full-tuition scholarships to designated Reagan Fellows.

=== Other notable alumni ===
- Emik Avakian (1948), inventor and owner of numerous patents
- Franklin Burghardt (1934), college football and basketball coach
- Harvey Butchart (1928), mathematician and explorer of Grand Canyon backcountry
- James E. Harris (1860s), lieutenant governor of Nebraska from 1897 to 1899
- Frank Frantz (1880s), Rough Rider and the final governor of Oklahoma Territory
- Winfred Ernest Garrison (1890s), president of Butler University and professor of philosophy and religion at the University of Chicago
- Dan C. Ogle (1924), U.S. Air Force Surgeon General and Major General
- Oliver Perry Hay (1870), zoologist
- William A. Poynter (1867), Nebraska politician and the tenth governor of Nebraska
- Neil Reagan (1933), radio, TV and advertising executive, brother of Ronald Reagan
- Tom Vaughn (about 1958), jazz pianist and Episcopal priest
- William L. White (1969), addiction treatment and recovery researcher, author and historian

== Notable faculty ==
- Cathy Compton, softball coach, 1987–1990
- Darrell Crouch, football coach, 2000–2004
- John Dooley (American football), football coach, 1967–1968
- Nicholas Fletcher, football coach, 1995–1999
- Joseph C. Hafele, mathematics, 1985–1991
- O. A. Hankner football coach, 1938
- Tom Hosier, football coach, 1974–1978
- Warner McCollum, football coach, 1979–1989 and athletic director
- Ralph McKinzie, football coach, 1921–1937
- Thomas O'Neal, football coach, 1915–1916
- Oliver Perry Hay, science, 1870–1873
- George H. Pritchard, football coach, 1917–1919
- Junius P. Rodriguez, historian, 1992–2023
- Emma Smith DeVoe, music, 1870–1871
- Ray Urban, football coach, 1969–1973
- Mary Frances Winston Newson, mathematics, 1921–1942
- Jamel Wright, president, 2017–present

== Bibliography ==
- Yager, Edward M., Ronald Reagan's Journey: Democrat to Republican, Rowman & Littlefield, 2006, ISBN 0-7425-4421-4
