= Eureka, Illinois =

- City
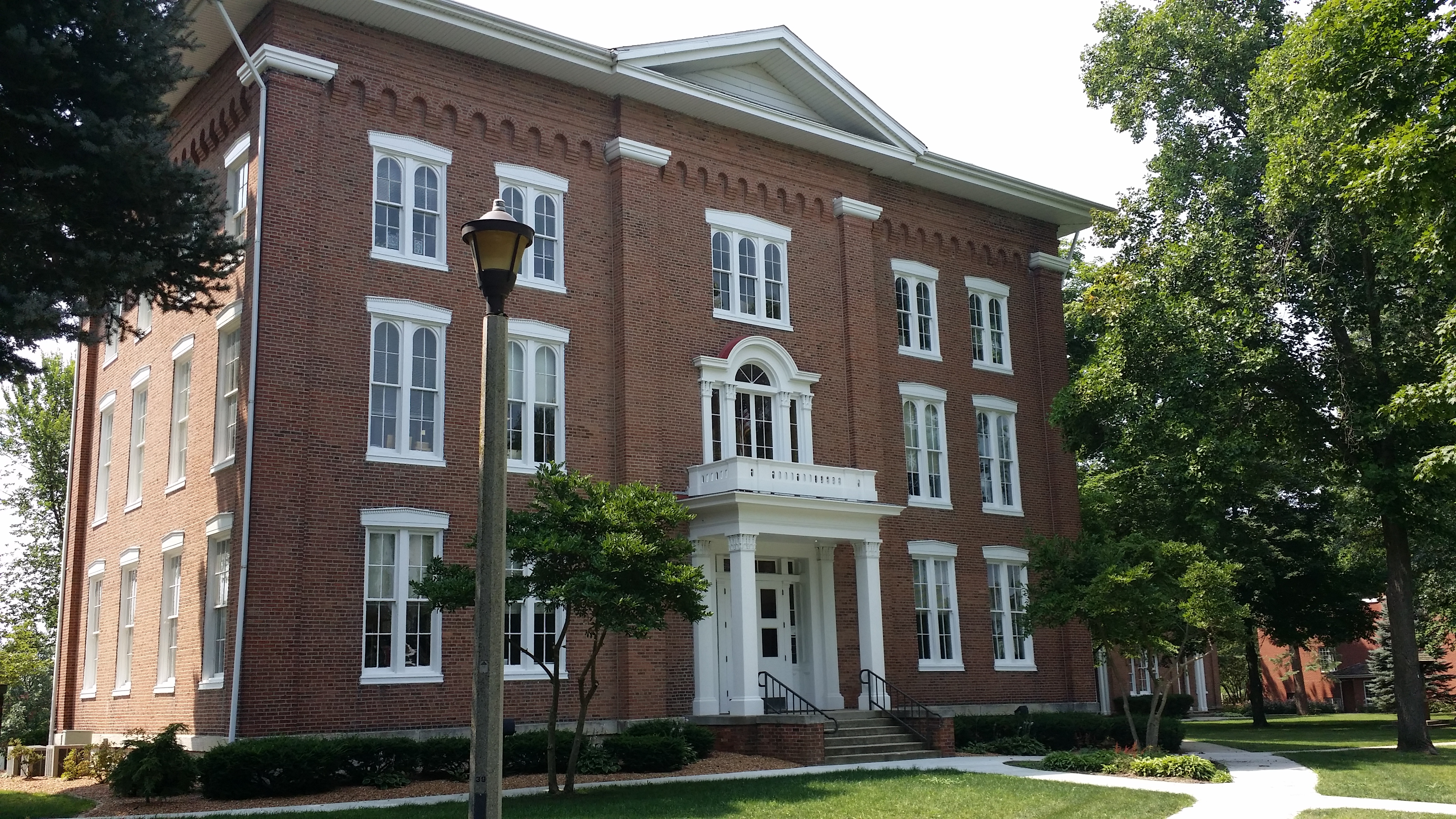
- Eureka College Administration Building
- Interactive map of Eureka, Illinois
- Location within Illinois Location within the United States
- Coordinates: 40°42′54″N 89°16′39″W
- Country: United States
- State: Illinois
- County: Woodford
- Founded: 1855

Government
  - Mayor: Eric Lind

Area
  - Total: 2.73 sq mi (7.08 km^{2})
  - Land: 2.68 sq mi (6.95 km^{2})
  - Water: 0.046 sq mi (0.12 km^{2})
- Elevation: 738 ft (225 m)

Population (2020)
  - Total: 5,227
  - Estimate (2024): 5,189
  - Density: 1,947.3/sq mi (751.86/km^{2})
- Time zone: UTC-6 (CST)
  - Summer (DST): UTC-5 (CDT)
- ZIP code: 61530
- Area code: 309
- FIPS code: 17-24543
- GNIS ID: 2394706
- Website: www.eurekaillinois.net

Eureka is a city in and the county seat of Woodford County, Illinois, United States. As of the 2020 census, Eureka had a population of 5,227. Eureka is part of the Peoria metropolitan area.

Eureka is a small community centered on the intersection of what is now U.S. 24 and Illinois 117. It is also one of the towns along the Ronald Reagan Trail, a series of roads that connect towns in central Illinois that were of importance to Reagan's early life. President Reagan attended and graduated from Eureka College.

== History ==
Eureka was originally laid out as Walnut Grove in 1855. The name was changed to Eureka because of a naming conflict with another Walnut Grove. Sources differ on who proposed the name Eureka. The city is named from the Greek expression Eureka, meaning "I have found it".

== Geography ==
According to the 2010 census, Eureka has a total area of 3.068 square miles (7.95 km^{2}), of which 3.02 square miles (7.82 km^{2}) (or 98.44%) is land and 0.048 square miles (0.12 km^{2}) (or 1.56%) is water.

== Demographics ==
Historical population
Census	Pop.	Note	%±
1860	604		—
1870	1,233		104.1%
1880	1,185		−3.9%
1890	1,481		25.0%
1900	1,661		12.2%
1910	1,525		−8.2%
1920	1,559		2.2%
1930	1,534		−1.6%
1940	1,714		11.7%
1950	2,367		38.1%
1960	2,538		7.2%
1970	3,028		19.3%
1980	4,306		42.2%
1990	4,435		3.0%
2000	4,871		9.8%
2010	5,295		8.7%
2020	5,227		−1.3%
U.S. Decennial Census

=== 2020 census ===
As of the 2020 census, Eureka had a population of 5,227. The median age was 38.0 years. 23.1% of residents were under the age of 18 and 21.1% of residents were 65 years of age or older. For every 100 females there were 95.0 males, and for every 100 females age 18 and over there were 90.6 males age 18 and over.

99.4% of residents lived in urban areas, while 0.6% lived in rural areas.

There were 1,981 households in Eureka, of which 28.6% had children under the age of 18 living in them. Of all households, 50.9% were married-couple households, 16.4% were households with a male householder and no spouse or partner present, and 28.0% were households with a female householder and no spouse or partner present. About 32.2% of all households were made up of individuals and 15.4% had someone living alone who was 65 years of age or older.

There were 2,126 housing units, of which 6.8% were vacant. The homeowner vacancy rate was 1.9% and the rental vacancy rate was 7.4%.

Racial composition as of the 2020 census
Race	Number	Percent
White	4,840	92.6%
Black or African American	87	1.7%
American Indian and Alaska Native	3	0.1%
Asian	32	0.6%
Native Hawaiian and Other Pacific Islander	3	0.1%
Some other race	37	0.7%
Two or more races	225	4.3%
Hispanic or Latino (of any race)	117	2.2%

=== 2000 census ===
As of the 2000 United States census, there were 4,871 people, 1,754 households, and 1,169 families residing in the city. The population density was 1,810.5 inhabitants per square mile (699.0/km^{2}). There were 1,831 housing units at an average density of 680.5 per square mile (262.7/km^{2}). The racial makeup of the city was 97.97% White, 0.57% African American, 0.37% Native American, 0.33% Asian, 0.16% from other races, and 0.60% from two or more races. Hispanic or Latino of any race were 1.03% of the population.

There were 1,754 households, out of which 31.7% had children under the age of 18 living with them, 55.9% were married couples living together, 8.3% had a female householder with no husband present, and 33.3% were non-families. 30.7% of all households were made up of individuals, and 17.3% had someone living alone who was 65 years of age or older. The average household size was 2.46 and the average family size was 3.12.

In the city, the population was spread out, with 24.3% under the age of 18, 14.5% from 18 to 24, 23.1% from 25 to 44, 16.9% from 45 to 64, and 21.1% who were 65 years of age or older. The median age was 36 years. For every 100 females, there were 85.2 males.

The median income for a household in the city was $44,744, and the median income for a family was $53,590. Males had a median income of $44,816 versus $22,692 for females. The per capita income for the city was $20,460. About 0.9% of families and 2.4% of the population were below the poverty line, including 1.8% of those under age 18 and 2.1% of those age 65 or over.

== Economy ==
The largest employers in Eureka are:

- Maple Lawn Homes - Independent and Assisted Living - 240 employees
- District 140 - School System - 220 employees
- Apostolic Christian Home - Independent and Assisted Living - 190 employees
- Woodford County Courthouse - County Seat - 161 employees
- Eureka Hospital - 150 employees
- Cox Transfer - Trucking Company - 125 employees
- Eureka College - 123 employees
- Mangold Ford Mercury - Auto Dealership - 64 employees
- Washington Equipment Co. - Overhead Cranes - 43 employees

== Education ==
=== Eureka College ===
Eureka is known for Eureka College, a private liberal arts college associated with the Christian Church (Disciples of Christ) and the alma mater of president Ronald Reagan. Reagan graduated in 1932 with a degree in economics and sociology and, throughout his life, remained very close to the college. Reagan returned to the town at least twelve times, including twice as President of the United States. In 1947, serving as the grand marshal for Eureka's annual pumpkin festival parade, the largest recorded parade crowds in the history of Eureka gathered along the streets to welcome back the Hollywood actor to his college hometown. Reports are the crowds were more than tenfold the town's 4,000 residents at the time. In 1967, as newly elected Governor of California and widely rumored prospective presidential candidate, Ronald Reagan returned to Eureka to dedicate the Melick Library at his alma mater, drawing more than 5,000 spectators. Eureka had styled itself the "pumpkin capital of the world" until its pumpkin-processing plant moved to nearby Morton, Illinois. The Reagan Museum and Peace Garden at Eureka College is a top tourist attraction in the community, especially after the 2010-2011 renovation of the Museum and of the Reagan special collection section at Melick Library at Eureka College. It is now estimated to be the largest center of Reagan memorabilia after the Reagan Presidential Library in California. People from all over the world visit the Ronald Reagan museum at Eureka College.

=== K-12 education ===
It is in the Eureka Community Unit District 140.

== Parks and recreation ==
Kaufman Park is the local 9 hole public golf course.

Eureka Lake Park is a 30 acres (12 ha) man-made impoundment lake with 240 acres (97 ha) of land. It was built in the 1940s as a WPA project to provide a water source for the city until 1982. It is located on Walnut Creek, a tributary to Panther Creek and Mackinaw River. Visitors may enjoy its picnic grounds and occasionally fishing, but big catches are rare. The park also contains a dog park and disc golf course.

== Notable people ==
- Donald Attig (b. 1936), boat designer and yachtsman, graduated from Eureka College
- Dan McCoy (b. 1978), comedian and television writer, is a 1996 graduate of Eureka High School
- John Peffers (1878–1936), Illinois state representative and lawyer, was born in Eureka
- Ronald Reagan, 40th U.S. president, who attended college in Eureka, Illinois at Eureka College
- Andy Studebaker (b. 1985) former NFL player, is a 2004 graduate of Eureka High School
- Mary Lou Sumner (1927–2002), Illinois state legislator
- Ben Zobrist (b. 1981), Major League Baseball player for the Chicago Cubs, was born and raised in Eureka
