= Okaw Valley Conference =

The Okaw Valley Conference was a high school athletic conference in the Illinois High School Association (IHSA), based in Central Illinois. The conference consisted of medium-sized and small high schools. It merged with the Corn Belt Conference to form the Illini Prairie Conference in the 2017-18 school year.

== History ==
The Okaw Valley Conference was formed in 1925. It originally consisted of Arcola, Arthur, Atwood-Hammond, Bement, Cerro Gordo, Monticello, Newman, Oakland, Sullivan, Tuscola, and Villa Grove. Tolono Unity was added in 1958. In 1971, the smallest seven schools left to form the Little Okaw Valley, and three schools were added: Decatur St Teresa, St Joseph-Ogden, and Warrensburg-Latham. In 1976, Arcola left and Mahomet-Seymour replaced them. In 1982, Sullivan and Warrensburg-Latham left and Argenta-Oreana was added. Tuscola dropped out in 1983. The league folded after the 1984 season.

In 1990 Argenta-Oreana, Clinton, St Teresa, Monticello, Sullivan, and Warrensburg-Latham resurrected the conference, and in 1995, Meridian and Maroa-Forsyth were added. Central A&M joined in 1997, Shelbyville in 1999, and Tuscola and Unity in 2006. The conference was split into two divisions for football in 2006. The Black Division consisted of Clinton, Monticello, Shelbyville, St. Teresa, Sullivan, and Unity. The Blue Division consisted of Argenta-Oreana, Central A&M, Maroa-Forsyth, Meridian, Tuscola, and Warrensburg-Latham. Each team played the five schools from their division, and then four from the other division.

In 2012, 9 teams officially left the Okaw and started a new conference called the Central Illinois Conference (CIC). These schools were Argenta-Oreana, Clinton, St. T, Meridian, Central A&M, Sullivan, Shelbyville, Warrensburg-Latham, and Tuscola. Three teams were left out of the new conference. These teams were Monticello, Tolono, and Maroa-Forsyth. Before the actual forming of the CIC, Argenta-Oreana decided to join the Little Okaw Valley Conference. The Okaw Valley Conference continued with Monticello, Tolono-Unity, Champaign St. Thomas More, St. Joseph-Ogden, and Rantoul.

Maroa-Forsyth High School left the conference for the Sangamo Conference after the 2015-16 school year. In April 2016, school boards of the remaining five schools and the school boards of the five schools in the Corn Belt Conference voted unanimously to merge into a new Illini Prairie Conference beginning in the 2017-18 school year.

== Final Members ==
Institution	Location	Mascot	Colors	Affiliation	9–12 enrollment	School website
Monticello	Monticello, Illinois	Sages	Purple and Gold	Public	517	http://www.monticello.k12.il.us/mhs
Rantoul	Rantoul, Illinois	Eagles	Purple and Gold	Public	787	https://web.archive.org/web/20161030091654/http://www.rths.k12.il.us/
St. Joseph-Ogden	St. Joseph, Illinois	Spartans	Maroon, White, Columbia Blue	Public	486	http://www.sjo.k12.il.us
St. Thomas More	Champaign, Illinois	Sabers	Hunter Green and Gold	Private	279 / 460.35(multiplied)	http://www.hs-stm.org/
Unity	Tolono, Illinois	Rockets	Maroon and White	Public	554	http://www.unityrockets.com/

=== Previous Members ===
Institution	Location	Mascot	Colors	Affiliation	Year joined	Year left	Current Conference
Arcola	Arcola, Illinois	Purple Riders	Purple and White	Public	1950s	1976	Lincoln Prairie
Argenta-Oreana	Argenta, Illinois	Bombers	Orange and Royal Blue	Public	1982, 1990	1984, 2014	Lincoln Prairie
Arthur	Arthur, Illinois	Knights	Red and White	Public	1950s	1971	Consolidated with Lovington in 2012
Atwood-Hammond	Atwood, Illinois	Rajahs	Black and Gold	Public	1950s	1971	Consolidated with Arthur-Lovington in 2014
Bement	Bement, Illinois	Bulldogs	Purple and White	Public	1950s	1971	Lincoln Prairie
Central A&M	Moweaqua, Illinois	Raiders	Black and Red	Public	1997	2012	Central Illinois
Cerro Gordo	Cerro Gordo, Illinois	Broncos	Navy and Orange	Public	1950s	1971	Lincoln Prairie
Clinton	Clinton, Illinois	Maroons	Maroon and Gold	Public	1990	2012	Central Illinois
Mahomet-Seymour	Mahomet, Illinois	Bulldogs	Orange and Navy	Public	1976	1984	Apollo
Maroa-Forsyth	Maroa, Illinois	Trojans	Royal Blue and Gold	Public	1995	2016	Sangamo
Meridian	Macon, Illinois	Hawks	Green and White	Public	1995	2012	Central Illinois
Newman	Newman, Illinois	Redskins	Red and White	Public	1950s	1971	Consolidated with Shiloh in 1994
Oakland	Oakland, Illinois	Titans	Purple and Orange	Public	1950s	1971	Lincoln Prairie (under Tri-County Co-op)
Shelbyville	Shelbyville, Illinois	Rams	Purple and White	Public	1999	2012	Central Illinois
St. Teresa	Decatur, Illinois	Bulldogs	Royal Blue and Orange	Private	1971, 1990	1984, 2012	Central Illinois
Sullivan	Sullivan, Illinois	Redskins	Red and Black	Public	1950s, 1990	1982, 2012	Central Illinois
Tuscola	Tuscola, Illinois	Warriors	Black and Gold	Public	1950s, 2006	1983, 2012	Central Illinois
Villa Grove	Villa Grove, Illinois	Blue Devils	Royal Blue and Gold	Public	1950s	1971	Lincoln Prairie
Warrensburg-Latham	Warrensburg, Illinois	Cardinals	Red and Gold	Public	1971, 1990	1982, 2012	Central Illinois

== Sports ==
The conference offers the following sports:

Boys sports

- Football, basketball, baseball, track and field (all schools)
- Soccer (Monticello, Unity, Maroa-Forsyth/Warrensburg-Latham Co-op)
- Golf (all schools except Unity)
- Cross-country
- Wrestling (Monticello, Unity, Argenta-Oreana/Maroa-Forsyth Co-op)

Girls sports

- Volleyball, basketball, softball (all schools)
- Soccer (Monticello, Maroa-Forsyth/Warrensburg-Latham Co-op)
- Cross-country (all schools, Maroa-Forsyth/Warrensburg-Latham Co-op)
- Track and field (all schools except Maroa-Forsyth/Warrensburg-Latham Co-op)
- Competitive cheering (all schools except Unity)
- Golf

== Notable accomplishments ==
=== Successes ===
- Argenta-Oreana: Girls Cross Country: 3rd place in 1992–93 & 2001–02
- Central A&M- Boys Football: 1st place 1997, 2nd place in 2001. Girls Basketball: 3rd place in 2007–08
- Clinton: Boys Golf: 2nd place 1996–97. Boys Wrestling: 3rd place 1989–90, 2nd place 1992–93, 4th place 1993–94, 2nd place 1999–2000, 3rd place 2000–01
- Maroa-Forsyth: Boys Football: 1st place 2006, 2nd place 2009. Boys Basketball: 1st place 2006–07 (only the second school in Illinois history to win a championship in both Football and Basketball in same year), 3rd place 2005–06. Girls Golf: 3rd place 2000–01, 2nd place 2001–02 & 2002–03. Girls Volleyball: 3rd place 2007–08
- Meridian: Boys Basketball: 1st place 2008–09. Boys Football: 2nd place 1999
- St. Teresa: Girls Cross Country won state in 2010. Girls tennis: 2nd in doubles in state in 2009
- Shelbyville: Competitive Cheering: 1st place 2005–06
- Sullivan: Boys Baseball: 2nd place 1997–98. Boys Golf: 3rd place 1979–80. Girls Basketball: 1st place 1990–91, 2nd place 1991–92. Scholastic Bowl: 4th place 1992–93 & 2000–01
- Tuscola: Boys Football: 1st place 2006–07 & 2009–10, 2nd place 2007–08, 2010–11, 2011-12. Boys Baseball: 4th place 2007–08, 2nd place 2011-12. Boys Track: 3rd place 2007–08. Girls Softball: 4th place 2011-12.
- Unity: Boys Football: 2nd place 2009–10. Girls Volleyball: 4th place 1977–78, 3rd place 1980–81, 2nd place 1978–79 and 2008–09
- Warrensburg-Latham: Boys Basketball: 3rd place 2002–03 & 2007–08. Girls Softball: 2nd place 2003–04. Scholastic Bowl: 1st place 2000–01, 3rd place 2008–09
