= Little Okaw Valley Conference =

High school conference in Illinois

- Conference: IHSA
- Founded: 1970
- No. of teams: 5
- Region: Central Illinois (Coles, Douglas, Moultrie, and Piatt Counties)

The Little Okaw Valley Conference is a high school conference in central Illinois, in the United States. The conference participates in athletics and activities in the Illinois High School Association. The conference comprises five small public high schools with enrollments between 80 and 270 students in Coles, Champaign, Douglas, Moultrie, and Piatt counties.

== History ==
Also known as the LOVC, the Little Okaw Valley Conference was founded in 1970 with schools from Arthur, Atwood, Bement, Cerro Gordo, Hammond, Homer, Newman, Oakland, and Villa Grove, Illinois.

Seven of the eight charter members were small schools from the Okaw Valley Conference and they included: Arthur, Atwood-Hammond, Bement, Cerro Gordo, Newman, Oakland, and Villa Grove High Schools. Additionally, the league included a school from the East Central Conference, Homer High School.

As the conference moved through the 1970s the number of teams remained the same, however, after the 1980 school year, Homer, Newman and Oakland would leave for the newly formed East Okaw Conference. However, Arcola and Lovington would join that same year.

The conference would include only six schools for the remainder of the 1980s with the next change occurring in 1994 as Atwood-Hammond and Bement would join forces as the South Piatt Coop during the football season, however, they would compete as individual schools for all other sports. Additionally that same year, Tuscola would join the league from the now defunct Meridian Conference. This, however, gave the league an odd number for all other sports beyond football.

Two years later, in 1996, the conference expanded with the addition of Broadlands Heritage, Hume Shiloh, Illiopolis Niantic-Harristown and the return of Oakland High School. This would put the league at 12 schools for all sports except football where there were 11 teams. The number of football teams were reduced for the 1997 season when Heritage and Shiloh began a football coop known as East Central. The league would stay nearly the same as the 1990s came to a close.

As the 2000s began, the league remained stable with very few changes. Bethany and Findlay High Schools consolidated into Okaw Valley and joined the league in 2001, the same year the Meridian Conference would cease to exist. In 2004, the high schools from Niantic-Harristown and Illiopolis consolidated, becoming Sangamon Valley High School. This again reduced the number of schools competing in the conference. However, the conference was not done growing and by 2006 the list of schools included 12 teams: Arcola, Arthur, Atwood-Hammond, Bement, Cerro Gordo, Heritage, Hume Shiloh, Lovington, Okaw Valley, Sangamon Valley, Tuscola, and Villa Grove. However, this would be the final year for Tuscola, they would leave for the Okaw Valley Conference at the end of the 2006–07 school year. In 2009, Martinsville, joined the league, increasing the number of schools to 13. The conference would remain status quo until 2014 where an expansion would take place as nine schools would leave the Okaw Valley Conference.

Argenta-Oreana, Decatur LSA, Hutsonville/Palestine (coop), Oblong, and Toledo Cumberland would join in 2014. This increase in schools created a two division football conference prior to the 2016 season. Those divisions were the Northwest and Southeast. The Northeast included: Arcola, Argenta-Oreana, Arthur-Lovington-Atwood-Hammond, Cerro Gordo-Bement, Decatur LSA, and Sangamon Valley. The Southeast included: Cumberland, Martinsville, Oblong, Palestine-Hutsonville, Tri-County, and Villa Grove. In 2018, another new member would join the LOVC, Blue Ridge High School.

Unfortunately, even before Blue Ridge joined the league, an uprising had begun based on the distance required to travel between schools as well as maintaining a closed football conference. Because of situation, in December 2017, 15 of the conference schools announced their intention to leave the LOVC. These schools were moving to a new conference, the Lincoln Prairie. The only schools not moving to the new league were Martinsville, Hutsonville, Palestine and Oblong.

The most recent school to join the conference is Bridgeport Red Hill High School. As of 2023, the conference maintains five high schools: Bridgeport Red Hill, Hutsonville, Oblong, Palestine, and Martinsville. None of the current schools are charter members.

== Member schools ==
School	Location	Mascot	Colors	Enrollment	IHSA Classes 1/2/3/4	IHSA Football Class	IHSA Football Type	Coop/Team	Affiliated Conference
Red Hill	Bridgeport, IL	Salukis	Red, White, Blue	264	A/1A/1A	1A	11-Man	No	Midland Trail
Hutsonville	Hutsonville, IL	Tigers; Lady Tigers	Orange, Black	105	A/1A/1A	2A	11-man	Oblong (Host); Palestine	None
Oblong	Oblong, IL	Panthers; Lady Panthers	Royal Blue, Gold	180	A/1A/1A	2A	11-Man	Hutsonville; Palestine	None
Palestine	Palestine, IL	Pioneers	Royal Blue, White	79	A/1A/1A	2A	11-Man	Oblong (Host); Hutsonville	None
Martinsville	Martinsville, IL	Blue Streaks	Blue, White	100	A/1A/1A	NA	8-Man	No	None

== Previous Members ==
School	Location	Mascot	Colors	Year Joined	Year Departed	Conference Joined	Current Conference	Consolidated Schools	Current High School
Arthur	Arthur, IL	Knights	Red, White	1970	2012	NA	Lincoln Prairie	Lovington (2012)	ALAH
Atwood-Hammond	Atwood, IL	Rajahs; Rajenes	Black, Gold	1970	2014	NA	Lincoln Prairie	Arthur-Lovington (2014)	ALAH
Bement	Bement, IL	Bulldogs; Lady Bulldogs	Purple, White	1970	2019	Lincoln Prairie	Lincoln Prairie	No	NA
Cerro Gordo	Cerro Gordo, IL	Broncos	Blue, Orange	1970	2019	Lincoln Prairie	Lincoln Prairie	No	NA
Homer	Homer, IL	Panthers	Maroon, Gold	1970	1980	East Okaw	School Closed (1988)	Broadlands ABL (1989)	Heritage
Newman	Newman, IL	Redskins	Red, White	1970	1980	East Okaw	School Closed (1994)	Hume Shiloh (1994)	Shiloh
Oakland	Oakland, IL	Titans; Lady Titans	Purple, Orange	1970; 1996	1980; 2019	East Okaw	Lincoln Prairie	No	NA
Villa Grove	Villa Grove, IL	Blue Devils	Blue, Gold	1970	2019	Lincoln Prairie	Lincoln Prairie	No	NA
Arcola	Arcola, IL	Purple Riders; Lady Riders	Purple, White	1980	2019	Lincoln Prairie	Lincoln Prairie	No	NA
Lovington	Lovington, IL	Panthers	Purple, Gold	1980	2012	NA	Lincoln Prairie	Arthur (2012)	ALAH
Tuscola	Tuscola, IL	Warriors; Lady Warriors	Black, Gold	1994	2007	Okaw Valley	Central Illinois	No	NA
Heritage	Broadlands, IL	Hawks	Navy Blue, Silver	1996	2019	Lincoln Prairie	Lincoln Prairie	No	NA
Shiloh	Hume, IL	Titans; Lady Titans	Blue, Orange, Purple	1996	2019	Lincoln Prairie	Lincoln Prairie	No	NA
Illiopolis	Illiopolis, IL	Pirates	Red, Black	1996	2004	NA	Lincoln Prairie	Niantic-Harristown (2004)	Sangamon Valley
Niantic-Harristown	Harristown, IL	Indians	Purple, Yellow	1996	2004	NA	Lincoln Prairie	Illiopolis (2004)	Sangamon Valley
Okaw Valley	Bethany, IL	Timberwolves	Blue, Silver, Black	2001	2019	Lincoln Prairie	Lincoln Prairie	No	NA
Sangamon Valley	Niantic, IL	Storm	Navy Blue, Silver, Columbia Blue	2004	2019	Lincoln Prairie	Lincoln Prairie	No	NA
Arthur-Lovington	Arthur, IL	Knights	Red, White	2012	2014	NA	Lincoln Prairie	Atwood-Hammond (2014)	ALAH
Argenta-Oreana	Argenta, IL	Bombers	Orange, Royal Blue	2014	2019	Lincoln Prairie	Lincoln Prairie	No	NA
Unity Christian	Decatur, IL	Lions; Lady Lions	Red, White, Black	2014	2019	Lincoln Prairie	Lincoln Prairie	No	NA
Cumberland	Toledo, IL	Pirates; Lady Pirates	Columbia Blue, Gold, White	2014	2019	Lincoln Prairie	Lincoln Prairie	No	NA
ALAH	Arthur, IL	Knights	Red, Black, Vegas Gold	2014	2019	Lincoln Prairie	Lincoln Prairie	No	NA
Blue Ridge	Farmer City, IL	Knights; Lady Knights	Royal Blue, Silver	2018	2019	Lincoln Prairie	Lincoln Prairie	No	NA

Sources:IHSA Conferences, and IHSA Member Schools Directory

== Membership timeline ==
Full Members
