= Sidell Township, Vermilion County, Illinois =

Sidell Township
- Township
- Location in Vermilion County
- Coordinates: 39°55′52″N 87°52′38″W
- Country: United States
- State: Illinois
- County: Vermilion
- Created: 1867

Area
  - Total: 43.38 sq mi (112.4 km^{2})
  - Land: 43.38 sq mi (112.4 km^{2})
  - Water: 0 sq mi (0 km^{2}) 0%
- Elevation: 676 ft (206 m)

Population (2010)
  - Estimate (2016): 1,024
  - Density: 24.7/sq mi (9.5/km^{2})
- Time zone: UTC-6 (CST)
  - Summer (DST): UTC-5 (CDT)
- FIPS code: 17-183-69849

Sidell Township is a township in Vermilion County, Illinois, USA. As of the 2010 census, its population was 1,073 and it contained 445 housing units.

== History ==
Sidell Township was created in 1867.

== Geography ==
According to the 2010 census, the township has a total area of 43.38 square miles (112.4 km^{2}), all land.

=== Cities and towns ===
- Allerton (east three-quarters)
- Sidell

=== Unincorporated towns ===
- Archie
- Hastings

=== Adjacent townships ===
- Vance Township (north)
- Jamaica Township (northeast)
- Carroll Township (east)
- Young America Township, Edgar County (south)
- Newman Township, Douglas County (southwest)
- Ayers Township, Champaign County (west)
- South Homer Township, Champaign County (northwest)

=== Cemeteries ===
The township contains one cemetery, Fairview.

=== Major highways ===
- Illinois State Route 49

== Demographics ==
Historical population
Census	Pop.	Note	%±
2016 (est.)	1,024
U.S. Decennial Census
