= Jamaica, Illinois =

Jamaica
- Unincorporated community
- Location of Jamaica within Illinois Jamaica (the United States)
- Coordinates: 39°59′28″N 87°48′24″W
- Country: United States
- State: Illinois
- County: Vermilion
- Township: Jamaica
- Elevation: 676 ft (206 m)
- Time zone: UTC-6 (CST)
  - Summer (DST): UTC-5 (CDT)
- Area code: 217

Jamaica is an unincorporated community in Jamaica Township, Vermilion County, Illinois.

== History ==
Like so many other small towns in the late 19th century, Jamaica developed because of the railroads. When the C&EI railroad came through the township, Jamaica thrived. However, when the Fairmount quarries closed, the town began to dwindle. It is now a small unincorporated area. School consolidation led to the new school being built near the town to replace the older Fairmount, Indianola, and Sidell high schools, and it was called Jamaica High School.

== Geography ==
Jamaica is located at 39°59′28″N 87°48′24″W ( 39.9911467, -87.8066939).
