= Vance Township, Vermilion County, Illinois =

Vance Township
- Township
- Location in Vermilion County
- Coordinates: 40°02′42″N 87°52′47″W
- Country: United States
- State: Illinois
- County: Vermilion
- Created: 1866

Area
  - Total: 40.03 sq mi (103.7 km^{2})
  - Land: 39.96 sq mi (103.5 km^{2})
  - Water: 0.08 sq mi (0.21 km^{2}) 0.20%
- Elevation: 666 ft (203 m)

Population (2010)
  - Estimate (2016): 1,010
  - Density: 26.5/sq mi (10.2/km^{2})
- Time zone: UTC-6 (CST)
  - Summer (DST): UTC-5 (CDT)
- FIPS code: 17-183-77304

Vance Township is a township in Vermilion County, Illinois, USA. As of the 2010 census, its population was 1,057 and it contained 457 housing units.

== History ==
Vance Township was created in 1866.

== Geography ==
According to the 2010 census, the township has a total area of 40.03 square miles (103.7 km^{2}), of which 39.96 square miles (103.5 km^{2}) (or 99.83%) is land and 0.08 square miles (0.21 km^{2}) (or 0.20%) is water.

=== Cities and towns ===
- Fairmount

=== Adjacent townships ===
- Oakwood Township (northeast)
- Catlin Township (east)
- Jamaica Township (southeast)
- Sidell Township (south)
- South Homer Township, Champaign County (west)
- Ogden Township, Champaign County (northwest)

=== Cemeteries ===
The township contains two cemeteries: Bodkin and Davis.

=== Airports and landing strips ===
- Catlett Landing Strip
- Rockin 'B' Farms Airport

== Demographics ==
Historical population
Census	Pop.	Note	%±
2016 (est.)	1,010
U.S. Decennial Census
