= Central Illinois Conference =

- Conference: IHSA
- Founded: 2014
- No. of teams: 6
- Region: Central Illinois
- Website: http://www.cicsports.com

The Central Illinois Conference or CIC, is a high school athletic conference in Central Illinois. The first year of existence was the 2014–15 school year. Its schools belong to the IHSA and compete in many sports and other activities.

== History ==
The conference started in the 2014–15 school year and originally included Argenta-Oreana, Clinton, St. Teresa, Meridian, Central A&M, Sullivan, Shelbyville, Warrensburg-Latham, and Tuscola all schools from the Okaw Valley Conference. Before the actual forming of the CIC, Argenta-Oreana decided to join the Little Okaw Valley Conference, so this left the new conference with 8 schools. On December 13, 2021, St. Teresa was removed from the conference by a 6–1 vote, with Sullivan abstaining from the vote. Sullivan abstained from the vote due to accepting an invitation to join the Lincoln Prairie Conference beginning in the 2023–24 school year.

School	Years	Previous Conferences
Central A&M	2014–Present	1997–2014 Okaw Valley Conference Meridian Conference (1959–92 as Moweaqua & Assumption) (1992–97 as Central A&M)
Clinton	2014–Present	1990–2014 Okaw Valley Conference 1950–90 Corn Belt Conference
Meridian	2014–Present	1995–2014 Okaw Valley Conference Meridian Conference (1959–94 as Macon & Blue Mound) (1994–95 as Meridian)
Shelbyville	2014–Present	1999–2014 Okaw Valley Conference 1996-1999 Independent 1952–1996 Mid-State Conference
St. Teresa	2014–2023	1971–2014 Okaw Valley Conference 1950–58 Central Conference
Sullivan	2014–2023	1950–82, 1990–2014 Okaw Valley Conference 1982–90 Independent
Tuscola	2014–Present	1950–83, 2007–2014 Okaw Valley Conference 1994–2007 Little Okaw Valley Conference
Warrensburg-Latham	2014–Present	1971–82, 1990–2014 Okaw Valley Conference

== Member schools ==
Departing members highlighted in red

Central Illinois Conference Members (clickable map)

There are 6 member schools in the Conference.

School	Location	Mascot	Colors	Affiliation	2021 9–12 enrollment	Year Joined	Previous Conference	School website
Central A & M High School	Moweaqua, Illinois	Raiders	Red, Black and White	Public	221.50	2014–15	Okaw Valley	https://www.camraiders.com
Clinton High School	Clinton, Illinois	Maroons	Maroon and Gold	Public	546	2014–15	Okaw Valley	http://www.cusd15.org
Meridian High School	Macon, Illinois	Hawks	Kelly Green, Silver and Black	Public	261.50	2014–15	Okaw Valley	http://www.meridianhawks.net
Shelbyville High School	Shelbyville, Illinois	Rams	Purple and White	Public	319	2014–15	Okaw Valley	http://www.shelbyville.k12.il.us
Tuscola Community High School	Tuscola, Illinois	Warriors	Black and Gold	Public	290.50	2014–15	Okaw Valley	http://www.tuscola.k12.il.us/
Warrensburg-Latham High School	Warrensburg, Illinois	Cardinals	Red and Gold	Public	312.50	2014–15	Okaw Valley	http://www.wl.k12.il.us/

=== Former members ===
School	Location	Mascot	Colors	Affiliation	2021 9–12 enrollment	Year Joined	Year Departed	Previous Conference
St. Teresa High School	Decatur, Illinois	Bulldogs	Orange and Blue	Private	230 / 379.50 (multiplied)	2014–15	2023	Okaw Valley
Sullivan High School	Sullivan, Illinois	Redskins	Red and Black	Public	304.50	2014–15	2023	Okaw Valley

== Sports ==
The conference offers the following sports:

Boys sports

- Football, basketball, baseball, golf, track and field (all schools)
- Cross-country (all schools except Meridian) (Warrensburg-Latham Co-op with Maroa-Forsyth)
- Soccer (Meridian, St. Teresa,) (Warrensburg-Latham Co-op with Maroa-Forsyth)
- Wrestling (Clinton, Shelbyville, Warrenburg-Latham)
- Swimming and diving (Clinton, St. Teresa, Sullivan Co-op with Shelbyville, Tuscola)
- Tennis (Meridian, Shelbyville, St. Teresa)

Girls sports

- Volleyball, basketball, softball, track and field (all schools)
- Cross-country (all schools except Meridian) (Warrensburg-Latham Co-op with Maroa-Forsyth)
- Golf (all schools except Warrensburg-Latham)
- Soccer (St. Teresa, Meridian) (Warrensburg-Latham Co-op with Maroa-Forsyth)
- Competitive cheering (all schools except Tuscola and Warrensburg-Latham)
- Tennis (Central A&M, Shelbyville, St. Teresa, Warrensburg-Latham)
- Swimming and diving (Clinton, St. Teresa, Sullivan co-op with Shelbyville, Tuscola)

== IHSA State Level Successes ==
- Central A&M- Boys Football: 2nd place 1992, 2nd place 1995, 2nd place 1996, 1st place 1997, 2nd place 2001 and 2nd place 2019. Girls Basketball: 3rd place 2007–08, 4th place 2013–14, 1st place 2014–15, 2nd place 2015–16. Girls Track: 2011-12 1st place, 2012-13 1st place
- Clinton: Boys Golf: 2nd place 1996–97. Boys Wrestling: 3rd place 1989–90, 2nd place 1992–93, 4th place 1993–94, 2nd place 1999–2000, 3rd place 2000–01
- Meridian- Boys Basketball: 1st place 2008–09. Boys Football: 2nd place 1999
- St. Teresa- Girls Cross Country won state in 2010. Girls tennis: 2nd in doubles in state in 2009, 1A Runner up Football in 2016, Boys Soccer State 3rd place 2018, 2A Football Final Four 2018,2A Football Final Four 2019, Volleyball State Champions 2019
- Shelbyville- Boys Basketball: 1st place 1996, Competitive Cheering: 1st place 2005–06
- Sullivan- Boys Baseball: 2nd place 1997–98. Boys Golf: 3rd place 1979–80. Boys Track: 2nd place 1985–86. Girls Basketball: 1st place 1990–91, 2nd place 1991–92. Girls Track: 3rd place 2013–14, 2014–15. Scholastic Bowl: 4th place 1992–93 & 2000–01
- Tuscola- Boys Football: 1st place 2006–07 & 2009–10, 2nd place 2007–08, 2010–11, 2011–12. Boys Baseball: 4th place 2007–08. Boys Track: 3rd place 2007–08. Girls Softball: 4th place 2011–12
- Warrensburg-Latham- Boys Basketball: 3rd place 2002–03 & 2007–08. Girls Softball: 2nd place 2003–04. Scholastic Bowl: 1st place 2000–01, 3rd place 2008–09

== Membership timeline ==
Full members Full members (Football Coop) Full members (non-football) Partial member (listed sports) Full members (8-man football) Lincoln Prairie Conference Other Conference

== See also ==
- List of Illinois High School Association member conferences
