= Brian Snitker =

American baseball coach and manager (born 1955)

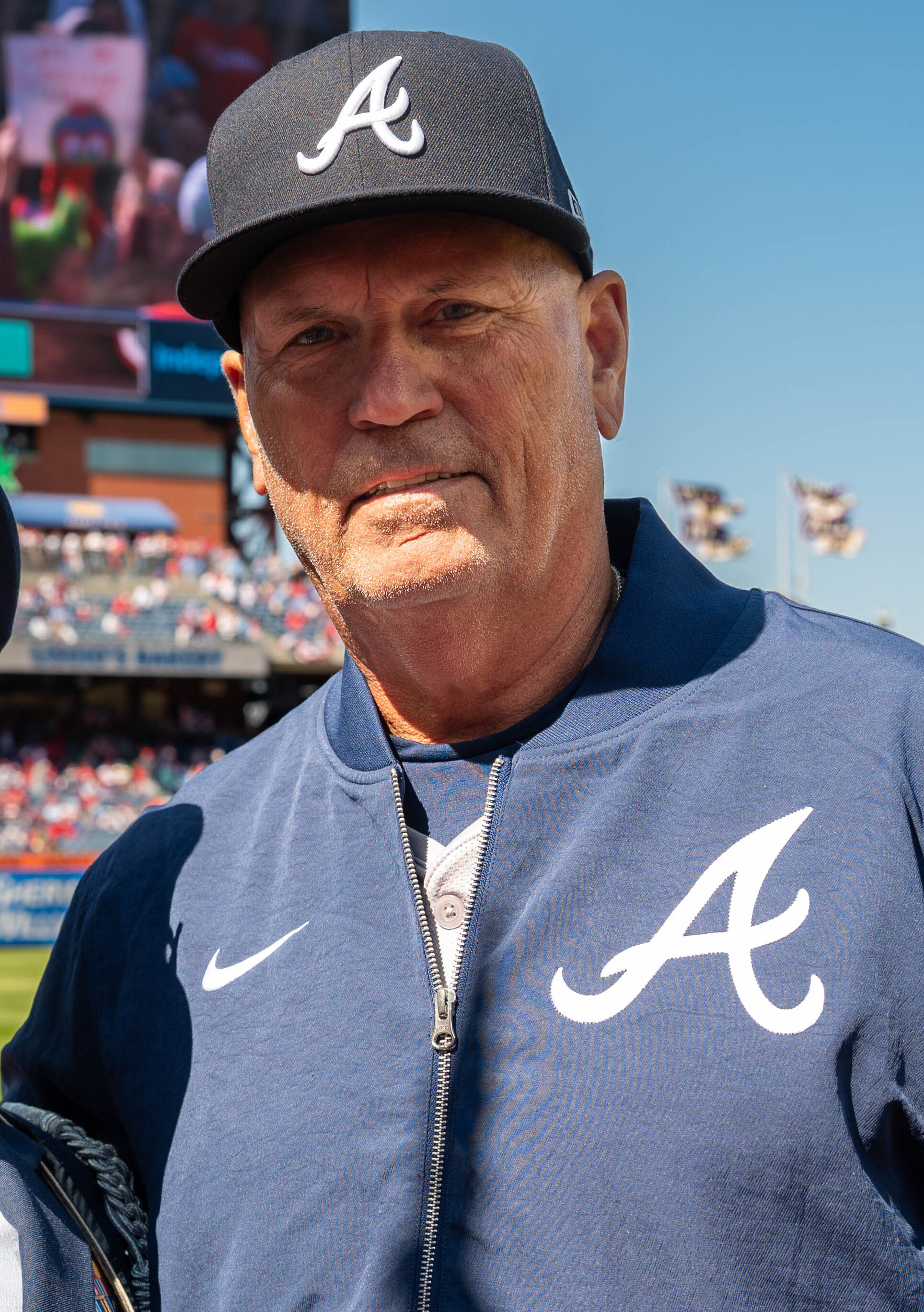
- Snitker with the Atlanta Braves in 2024
- Manager / Coach
- Born: October 17, 1955 (age 70); Decatur, Illinois, U.S.
- Bats: Right Throws: Right

MLB statistics
- Managerial record: 811–668
- Winning %: .548
- Stats at Baseball Reference
- Managerial record at Baseball Reference

Teams
- As manager: Atlanta Braves (2016–2025); As coach: Atlanta Braves (1985, 1988–1990, 2007–2013)

Career highlights and awards
- World Series champion (2021); NL Manager of the Year (2018); Braves Hall of Fame

Brian Gerald Snitker (born October 17, 1955) is an American professional baseball coach and manager. He was the manager for the Atlanta Braves of Major League Baseball (MLB) for 10 seasons from 2016 to 2025. Snitker has spent 49 years in the Braves organization, starting as a catcher and first baseman in the Braves' minor league system from 1977 to 1980.

As manager, he led the Braves to the 2021 World Series, which they won 4 games to 2 over the Houston Astros; it was the franchise's fourth World Series title, their first World Series appearance since 1999 and first championship since 1995.

== Early life ==
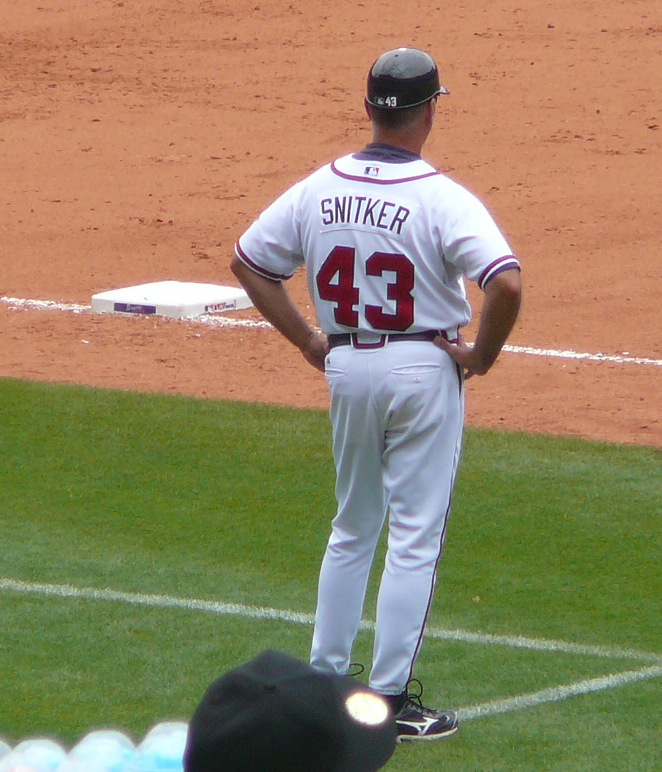
Snitker as the Braves third base coach

Snitker was born in Decatur, Illinois, to Richard F. Snitker and Catherine (Collins) Snitker. He grew up in Macon, Illinois, where he attended Macon High School, and played as a right fielder for the 1971 baseball team. The team's surprising run to the state championship tournament was documented in Chris Ballard's 2012 book One Shot at Forever: A Small Town, an Unlikely Coach, and a Magical Baseball Season.

As a youth, Snitker also played American Legion Baseball, an experience that he said in a 2018 interview, "Gave me the platform to be seen because there are always scouts at American Legion games. It had a big part on my development as a player and helping me get a jump on a professional career."

== Playing career ==
Snitker played two seasons of junior college ball for Lincoln College in 1975. He served as catcher for the Lynx baseball team where he was second team All-State. He finished his college career with two seasons at the University of New Orleans.

Following his injury-shortened junior season at the University of New Orleans, Snitker was drafted in the 25th round of the MLB draft by the Chicago Cubs. He opted to return to UNO for his senior season, and then signed a free agent contract with the Braves organization in 1977. Snitker bounced around the minors, mostly in Class A (equivalent to High-A today). He primarily saw time at catcher while occasionally playing first base in the minor leagues, registering a slash line of .254/.316/.390 with 23 home runs in 780 at bats.

== Coaching career ==
The Braves released him in 1980, but immediately rehired him as a roving minor league instructor. He was hired as a minor league manager for the Anderson Braves in 1982, where he led the team to its only winning season of its five-year stint in Anderson, before moving to the Durham Bulls the following season. He also managed the Macon Braves, Myrtle Beach Pelicans, Greenville Braves, Mississippi Braves and Richmond Braves, all in the Braves farm system. He was also the Atlanta Braves' bullpen coach in 1985 and 1988–1990. A few of his honors during his fifteen-year run as a minor league manager are winning two championships with the Myrtle Beach Pelicans in 1999 and 2000, and in those same years he won the Carolina League Manager of the Year.

From 2007 to 2013, Snitker served as the Braves' third-base coach. He was named to that position on October 3, 2006, replacing Fredi González, who left to join the Florida Marlins as manager. When González was named Braves manager for the 2011 season after Bobby Cox's retirement, Snitker was kept on as third base coach.

On October 14, 2013, Snitker was named the manager of the Braves Triple-A club, the Gwinnett Braves.

== Managerial career ==
On May 17, 2016, Snitker was named Atlanta's interim manager, replacing Fredi González, who was fired. On October 11, 2016, the Braves named Snitker their full time manager for the 2017 season. The team announced on October 5, 2017, that Snitker would return as manager for the 2018 season. On October 15, 2018, the Braves gave Snitker a two-year contract extension with a club option for 2021. On November 13, 2018, Snitker was awarded the National League Manager of the Year Award for the 2018 season. Snitker shared that year's Sporting News National League Manager of the Year Award with Craig Counsell.

In 2019, Snitker led the Braves to their second consecutive division title. Snitker and Counsell were named finalists for the National League Manager of the Year Award in 2019, losing to Mike Shildt. On October 23, 2019, Snitker won his second Sporting News National League Manager of the Year Award. In February 2020, Snitker agreed to another contract extension with the Braves, through the 2021 season. On September 22, 2020, he led them to a third straight NL East Division title as the Braves defeated the Marlins, 11–1. Snitker led the Braves to a 2–0 series sweep over the Cincinnati Reds in the National League Wild Card Series, which was their first postseason series victory since 2001. Although they reached the NLCS for the first time in 19 years, the Braves lost to the Los Angeles Dodgers in seven games despite holding a 3–1 lead in the series. The 2020 Braves managed to pitch four shutouts within the first five games of a postseason, joining the 1905 New York Giants as the only teams in Major League Baseball history to accomplish the feat.

On February 26, 2021, Snitker signed another extension to remain with the Braves through the 2023 season with a club option for 2024. In 2021, Snitker and the Braves went 88–73 during the regular season, defeated the Milwaukee Brewers in the National League Division Series, beat the Los Angeles Dodgers in the National League Championship Series, and won the World Series against the Houston Astros. He came in fourth in the voting for National League Manager of the Year, as the award was won by San Francisco Giants manager Gabe Kapler.

On November 30, 2021, the Braves extended Snitker's contract through the 2024 season. During the 2022 regular season the Braves went 101–61, for Snitker's first 100-win season as a manager.

On January 27, 2023, Snitker signed a three-year extension with the Braves that runs through the 2025 season. The Braves won 104 games in the 2023 regular season, securing Snitker his second consecutive 100-win season.

In the 2024 season, the Braves were weakened by significant injuries to several of their key players, including Spencer Strider, Ronald Acuña Jr., and Austin Riley. Still, Snitker guided the Braves to 89 wins and a playoff berth for the seventh consecutive year, before losing to the Padres in the 2024 National League Wild Card Series.

After a disappointing 2025 season in which the team went 76–86 and missed the playoffs. Snitker announced his retirement as manager and has transitioned into a senior advisory role with the organization.

On April 25, 2026, Snitker was inducted into the Braves Hall of Fame.

=== Managerial record ===
As of games played on September 28, 2025

Team	Year	Regular season					Postseason			
Team	Year	Games	Won	Lost	Win %	Finish	Won	Lost	Win %	Result
ATL	2016	124	59	65	.476	5th in NL East	–	–	–	–
ATL	2017	162	72	90	.444	3rd in NL East	–	–	–	–
ATL	2018	162	90	72	.556	1st in NL East	1	3	.250	Lost NLDS (LAD)
ATL	2019	162	97	65	.599	1st in NL East	2	3	.400	Lost NLDS (STL)
ATL	2020	60	35	25	.583	1st in NL East	8	4	.667	Lost NLCS (LAD)
ATL	2021	161	88	73	.547	1st in NL East	11	5	.688	Won World Series (HOU)
ATL	2022	162	101	61	.623	1st in NL East	1	3	.250	Lost NLDS (PHI)
ATL	2023	162	104	58	.642	1st in NL East	1	3	.250	Lost NLDS (PHI)
ATL	2024	162	89	73	.549	2nd in NL East	0	2	.000	Lost NLWCS (SD)
ATL	2025	162	76	86	.469	4th in NL East	–	–	–	–
Total		1,479	811	668	.548		24	23	.511	

== Personal life ==
Snitker and his wife, Veronica (Ronnie), have two children. Snitker's father Richard died in 1993, and his mother Catherine died in March 2019.

In the 2011 Major League Baseball draft, Snitker's son Troy was drafted by the Braves in the 19th round and traded to the Pittsburgh Pirates in March 2013. After retiring as a player, Troy joined the Houston Astros organization as a coach. The Atlanta Braves faced the Houston Astros in the 2021 World Series, making the series a family affair for the Snitkers. Snitker and Troy, for the Braves and Astros, respectively, presented the lineup cards before Game Three of the World Series.
