= Terry Miller (linebacker) =

American football player (born 1946)

No. 57, 58
- Position: Linebacker

Personal information
- Born: April 11, 1946 (age 80); Mattoon, Illinois, U.S.
- Listed height: 6 ft 2 in (1.88 m)
- Listed weight: 225 lb (102 kg)

Career information
- High school: Arcola (Arcola, Illinois)
- College: Illinois (1964-1967)
- NFL draft: 1968: 8th round, 202nd overall pick

Career history
- Detroit Lions (1970); St. Louis Cardinals (1971–1974)

Awards and highlights
- Second-team All-Big Ten (1967)

Career NFL statistics
- Fumble recoveries: 1
- Sacks: 1.5
- Stats at Pro Football Reference

Terry Miller (born April 11, 1946) is an American former professional football player who was a linebacker for the Detroit Lions and St. Louis Cardinals of the National Football League (NFL). He played college football for the Illinois Fighting Illini.

== Early life ==
Miller was a three-sport star at Arcola High School. He played forward for the Arcola basketball team that reached the "Sweet Sixteen" his senior year and was offered scholarships by several Big Ten schools. But Miller wanted to play football and was offered a scholarship by the University of Illinois Urbana-Champaign, where he played linebacker for the Fighting Illini from 1964 to 1967.

== Pro career ==
Miller was selected in the eighth round by the Detroit Lions in the 1968 NFL/AFL draft but he hurt his back water skiing and never made it to training camp. He was on the taxi squad in 1969 and played in one game in 1970. He signed as a free agent with the St. Louis Cardinals in 1971 where he played for four seasons. Miller primarily played on special teams with the Cardinals, but he did start nine games at linebacker in 1972 and recorded one sack.

Miller retired from football in 1975. He currently resides in Kentucky and is in the horse racing business.
