= Ogden Township =

Ogden Township may refer to the following places in the United States:

- Ogden Township, Champaign County, Illinois
- Ogden Township, Riley County, Kansas
- Ogden Township, Michigan
