= Ayers Township, Champaign County, Illinois =

Ayers Township
- Township
- Location in Champaign County

- Champaign County's location in Illinois
- Coordinates: 39°54′58″N 87°57′59″W
- Country: United States
- State: Illinois
- County: Champaign

Area
  - Total: 22.88 sq mi (59.3 km^{2})
  - Land: 22.88 sq mi (59.3 km^{2})
  - Water: 0 sq mi (0 km^{2}) 0%
- Elevation: 702 ft (214 m)

Population (2020)
  - Total: 421
  - Density: 18.4/sq mi (7.10/km^{2})
- Time zone: UTC-6 (CST)
  - Summer (DST): UTC-5 (CDT)
- ZIP codes: 61810, 61816, 61849
- FIPS code: 17-019-03246

Ayers Township is one of thirty townships in Champaign County, Illinois, USA. As of the 2020 census, its population was 421 and it contained 198 housing units.

== History ==
Ayers Township, named after the landowner at the time, was formed from a portion of South Homer Township on 9 September 1885.

== Geography ==
Ayers is Township 17 North, Range 11 East of the Third Principal Meridian and part of Range 14 West of the Second Principal Meridian. When the federal township land surveys were done in 1821 one group of surveyors went west from the Second Principal Meridian and another went east from the Third Principal Meridian. Both groups used rawhide measuring lines that expanded and contracted with the weather. When the two groups met in eastern Champaign County the surveys didn't agree, resulting in double section numbers in the eastern townships and ongoing property line confusion among landowners.

Lost Grove (Section 6, T17N, R11E) was a timber grove along the upper Little Vermilion River. It was a well known traveler's landmark on the 1838 unpaved dirt road going from Paris in Edgar County to Urbana. The road ceased to exist when township roads on section lines were established in 1860.

According to the 2010 census, the township has a total area of 22.88 square miles (59.3 km^{2}), all land.

Map of Ayers Township

=== Cities, towns, villages ===
- Allerton (west quarter)
- Broadlands

=== Cemeteries ===
The township contains these two cemeteries: Immanuel Lutheran (Section 18, T17N, R11E) and Saint John (Section 19, T17N, R11E).

=== Major highways ===
- Illinois Route 49

== Demographics ==
As of the 2020 census there were 421 people, 187 households, and 147 families residing in the township. The population density was 18.40 inhabitants per square mile (7.10/km^{2}). There were 198 housing units at an average density of 8.65 per square mile (3.34/km^{2}). The racial makeup of the township was 92.87% White, 0.71% African American, 0.00% Native American, 0.24% Asian, 0.00% Pacific Islander, 0.71% from other races, and 5.46% from two or more races. Hispanic or Latino of any race were 2.38% of the population.

There were 187 households, out of which 29.40% had children under the age of 18 living with them, 75.40% were married couples living together, 2.14% had a female householder with no spouse present, and 21.39% were non-families. 16.00% of all households were made up of individuals, and 7.50% had someone living alone who was 65 years of age or older. The average household size was 2.57 and the average family size was 2.90.

The township's age distribution consisted of 19.6% under the age of 18, 6.9% from 18 to 24, 15.8% from 25 to 44, 34.6% from 45 to 64, and 23.1% who were 65 years of age or older. The median age was 50.6 years. For every 100 females, there were 101.7 males. For every 100 females age 18 and over, there were 92.0 males.

The median income for a household in the township was $73,125, and the median income for a family was $82,917. Males had a median income of $39,583 versus $37,917 for females. The per capita income for the township was $48,826. About 12.2% of families and 14.8% of the population were below the poverty line, including 9.6% of those under age 18 and 13.5% of those age 65 or over.

Historical population
| Census | Pop. | Note | %± |
|---|---|---|---|
| 2010 | 453 | | — |
| 2020 | 421 | | −7.1% |
U.S. Decennial Census

== School districts ==
- Heritage Community Unit School District 8

== Political districts ==
- Illinois' 15th congressional district
- State House District 104
- State Senate District 52
