= Arcola High School =

Location
- 351 W Washington Street; Arcola, Illinois 61910; United States
- Coordinates: 39.6826°N 88.3171°W

Information
- Other name: AHS
- Type: Public high school
- School district: Arcola Community Unit School District 306
- NCES School ID: 170396000083
- Principal: Nick Lindsey
- Teaching staff: 27.12 (FTE)
- Grades: 7–12
- Enrollment: 299 (2024–25)
- Student to teacher ratio: 10.73
- Campus: Small town, Rural
- Colors: Purple and white
- Athletics: IHSA
- Athletics conference: Lincoln Prairie Conference
- Nickname: Purple Riders
- Rival: Tuscola Community High School (Cola Wars)
- Accreditation: North Central Association of Colleges and Schools
- Newspaper: Insider
- Yearbook: Torch
- Website: www.arcola.k12.il.us

Arcola High School (AHS) is a public high school in Arcola, Illinois, United States. It is part of the Arcola Community Unit School District 306.

== Athletics ==
Arcola's High School athletes participate in the Lincoln Prairie Conference and are members of the Illinois High School Association. There is a broad range of sporting activities in which the students participate, currently numbering at least five different sports for boys and six for girls.

Boys: baseball, basketball, football, golf, track and field.

Girls: basketball, cheerleading, golf, softball, track and field, and volleyball.

=== Athletic honors ===
- Football: 1977–78 (2nd), 1978–79 (1st), 1985–86 (1st), 1988–89 (1st), 1991–92 (2nd), 1995–96 (2nd), 2015–16 (1st)
- Boys' Track: 2014–15 (3rd)

== Notable alumni ==
- Terry Miller (1964), former NFL player
