= Clinton High School (Clinton, Illinois) =

School in Illinois, United States

Coordinates: 40°8′45″N 88°58′40″W

- 1200 Highway 54 West Clinton, IL

Information
- School district: Clinton Unit School District #15
- Superintendent: Curt Nettles
- Principal: Jerry Wayne
- Faculty: 39.15 (FTE)
- Grades: 9-12
- Enrollment: 507 (2023–2024)
- Student to teacher ratio: 12.95
- Colors: Maroon; Gold
- Athletics: IHSA
- Athletics conference: Central Illinois Conference
- Team name: Maroons
- Yearbook: Clintonia
- Website: School home page

Clinton Community High School is a secondary school located in Clinton, Illinois, US. Students who attend the school live in Clinton and surrounding towns such as, Wapella, Kenney, Hallsville and Lane.

The superintendent is Curt Nettles and the principal is Jerry Wayne.

In 2012–2013, around 566 students attended Clinton High School. The average class size was about 18.5 students, which is below the state average.

In 2012-13 the graduation rate was about 90.5% compared with the state average of 87%. The attendance rate was 93.2%, below the state rate of 94.2.

Clinton had an average composite score of 197 on the ACT exam.

== Athletics ==
The Clinton Maroons participate in the Central Illinois Conference in the following sports:

- Baseball (boys)
- Basketball (both)
- Cheerleading (girls)
- Cross country (coed)
- American football (boys)
- Golf (both)
- M-Squad (girls)
- Softball (girls)
- Swimming (both)
- Track and field (both)
- Volleyball (girls)
- Wrestling (boys)

== Notable alumni ==
- Keith Brendley, expert on active protection systems and founder of Artis, a company that provides products and services for defense and safety markets
