= Lorinne Vozoff =

American actress, director, and acting teacher

Lorinne Vozoff (born Lorinne Dills) is an American actress, director, playwright, and acting teacher. She is the founder of Theatre Group Studio and the author of Changing Circumstances: An Acting Manual. Her work spans film, television, and stage. She has also been active in actor training and arts education for decades.

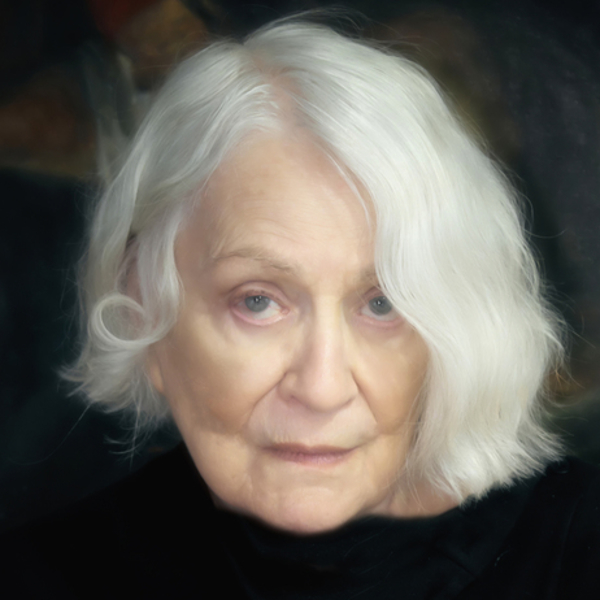
Lorinne Vozoff, 2025 headshot (used with permission).

== Early life and education ==
Vozoff was born in Quincy, Illinois, to Margaret Mae (née Durbin) and Kenneth Eugene Dills. She graduated from St. Teresa High School in 1950. She studied at the University of Illinois and later at UCLA.

== Career ==
Vozoff has worked extensively as an actor, director, playwright, and teacher. She founded the Theatre Group Studio in Los Angeles in 1999 and authored the acting manual Changing Circumstances. Her stage credits include lead roles in Medea, Fefu and Her Friends, The Man of Destiny, The Jewish Wife, The Glass Menagerie, Private Lives, The Lion in Winter, Blithe Spirit, Escape from Happiness, and A Delicate Balance.

As a playwright, she wrote Speak to Me and What’s Mine, both of which were staged at Theatre for the New City in New York’s East Village. She has also written two novels, Enigma and Hidden Object.

Her film appearances include Shining Through, Impulse, Heart and Souls, and Irreconcilable Differences. On television, she has guest-starred in numerous series including Six Feet Under, Star Trek: Voyager, Party of Five, NYPD Blue, ER, L.A. Law, The Mentalist, American Horror Story, and Major Crimes.

== Books and publications ==
- Changing Circumstances: An Acting Manual
- Enigma
- Hidden Object

== Selected stage work ==
Title	Role	Venue / Production Company	Director
Life Masks	Eleonora Duse	Theatre for the New City, NYC	Lorinne Vozoff / Eduardo Machado
Oedipus Machina	Tiresias	Odyssey Theatre	Ron Sossi
The Assassination of Heinrich Reinebach	Lily	Theatre Group Studio	Lorinne Vozoff
Escape from Happiness	Nora	Open Fist Theatre	Martha Demson
Creditors	Tekla	Rose Theatre	Lorinne Vozoff
The Glass Menagerie	Amanda	Birmingham-Southern College	Alan Litsey
It Changes Every Year	Sonia	Naked Angels, Coast Playhouse	Darrell Larson
Homage That Follows	Kaybee	New Mexico Repertory, Santa Fe	Mark Medoff
Medea	Medea	Callboard Theatre	John Allison
Fefu and Her Friends	Fefu	Padua Hills and Pasadena	Maria Irene Fornes

== Selected filmography ==
Title	Year	Role	Notes
Shining Through	1992	Personnel Director	Film
Impulse	1990	Mrs. Russell	Film
Heart and Souls	1993	Mrs. Agnus Miller	Film
Irreconcilable Differences	1984	Judge Shalack	Film
Six Feet Under	2003	Jessica Wilcox	TV series, 1 episode
Star Trek: Voyager	2001	Irene Hansen	TV series, 1 episode
Party of Five	1996	Sister Anne	TV series, 1 episode
NYPD Blue	1994	Judge Feldman	TV series, 1 episode
ER	1996	Mrs. Lancer	TV series, 1 episode
Thirtysomething	1989	Ivy Dunbar	TV series, 1 episode
L.A. Law	1989–1992	Judge Roberta Harbin	TV series, 8 episodes
The Mentalist	2010	Lillian Matlock	TV series, 1 episode
American Horror Story	2011	Used Bookstore Owner	TV series, 1 episode
Major Crimes	2013	Mrs. Whitman	TV series, 1 episode
