= Allerton, Illinois =

- Village
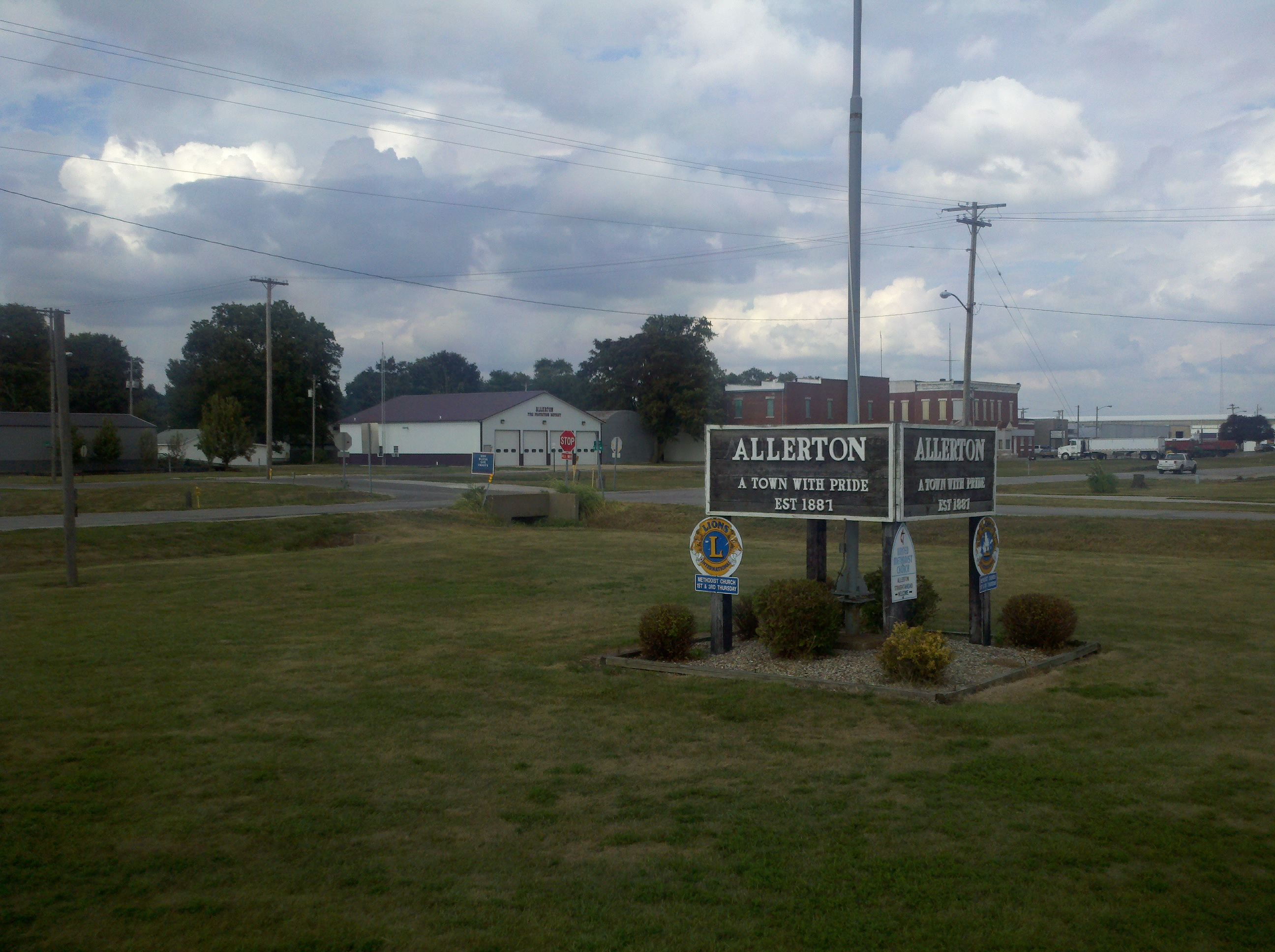
- The southwest side of Allerton
- Interactive map of Allerton, Illinois
- Location of Allerton Allerton, Illinois (Illinois)
- Coordinates: 39°54′58″N 87°56′07″W
- Country: United States
- State: Illinois
- Counties: Vermilion, Champaign
- Townships: Sidell, Ayers

Government
  - Village President: John R. Cutsinger

Area
  - Total: 0.68 sq mi (1.76 km^{2})
  - Land: 0.68 sq mi (1.76 km^{2})
  - Water: 0 sq mi (0.00 km^{2})
- Elevation: 699 ft (213 m)

Population (2020)
  - Total: 262
  - Density: 385.9/sq mi (148.99/km^{2})
- Time zone: UTC-6 (CST)
  - Summer (DST): UTC-5 (CDT)
- Postal code: 61810
- Area code: 217
- FIPS code: 17-00880
- GNIS ID: 2397939

Allerton is a village in Sidell Township, Vermilion County, Illinois, United States. A small portion of the village extends into Champaign County. The population was 262 at the 2020 census.

== History ==
Samuel W. Allerton was a wealthy landowner in Vermilion County who had made his fortune on the agricultural and livestock markets. He was one of the founders of the First National Bank of Chicago and co-founder of the Chicago Union Stockyards. The town was founded on a 3,800-acre (15 km^{2}) tract of land in the southwestern part of the county which Allerton purchased in 1880. It had formerly been known as Twin Grove Farm (because of two very similar 100-acre (0.40 km^{2}) groves of trees in the area). When the C&EI railroad came through the area, he gave them a right-of-way through his land, and then established a grain elevator and platted the village; later he provided land for a park, established a bank, provided funds for a new brick school in 1894, and installed a water system. Allerton himself continued to live in Chicago.

Samuel Allerton also owned 12,000 acres in Piatt County, part of which later became the Robert Allerton Park, farther west in the Monticello area; Robert was Samuel's son who oversaw his father's agricultural interests in Illinois. Samuel's total land holdings included 78,000 acres across four Midwest states.

== Geography ==
Allerton is located near the southwestern corner of Vermilion County and extends west into Champaign County in two places. Champaign-Urbana is about 30 miles (48 km) to the northwest, and Danville is the same distance to the northeast.

According to the 2021 census gazetteer files, Allerton has a total area of 0.68 square miles (1.76 km^{2}), all land. Allerton is located on the county line, and a small portion of is located in Champaign County, Illinois.

== Demographics ==
Historical population
Census	Pop.	Note	%±
1910	379		—
1920	371		−2.1%
1930	338		−8.9%
1940	303		−10.4%
1960	282		—
1970	327		16.0%
1980	303		−7.3%
1990	274		−9.6%
2000	293		6.9%
2010	291		−0.7%
2020	262		−10.0%
U.S. Decennial Census

As of the 2020 census there were 262 people, 101 households, and 76 families residing in the village. The population density was 385.86 inhabitants per square mile (148.98/km^{2}). There were 116 housing units at an average density of 170.84 per square mile (65.96/km^{2}). The racial makeup of the village was 91.60% White, 2.67% African American, 0.76% Native American, and 4.96% from two or more races. Hispanic or Latino of any race were 1.15% of the population.

There were 101 households, out of which 25.7% had children under the age of 18 living with them, 59.41% were married couples living together, 9.90% had a female householder with no husband present, and 24.75% were non-families. 14.85% of all households were made up of individuals, and 3.96% had someone living alone who was 65 years of age or older. The average household size was 3.00 and the average family size was 2.64.

The village's age distribution consisted of 21.0% under the age of 18, 4.5% from 18 to 24, 25.4% from 25 to 44, 34.1% from 45 to 64, and 15.0% who were 65 years of age or older. The median age was 42.8 years. For every 100 females, there were 88.0 males. For every 100 females age 18 and over, there were 90.1 males.

The median income for a household in the village was $60,208, and the median income for a family was $63,750. Males had a median income of $31,667 versus $33,333 for females. The per capita income for the village was $24,257. About 9.2% of families and 9.4% of the population were below the poverty line, including 1.9% of those under age 18 and 2.5% of those age 65 or over.

== Education ==
It is in the Heritage Community Unit School District 8.
