= Keith Brendley =

American executive

- Born: 1958 (age 67–68)
- Education: University of Illinois, B.S.; University of Maryland, M.S.; MIT (no degree)
- Occupation: President of Artis
- Years active: 1999–present
- Spouse: Greta Brendley
- Children: 2
- Website: Artis biography

Keith W. Brendley (born 1958) is a leading American authority on active protection systems, and serves as president of Artis, a company which provides high-technology systems to defense and commercial markets.

== Early life ==
Brendley was born in East St. Louis, Illinois, the second of four sons of Donald and Dolores Brendley. His father served in the U.S. Air Force and worked as a financial executive for McDonnell Douglas and other firms, and later taught accounting at Richland Community College in Decatur, Illinois.

In 1976, Brendley graduated from Clinton High School in Clinton, Illinois. He attended the University of Illinois, where he received a B.S. degree in mechanical engineering. He went on to receive his M.S. degree from the University of Maryland in mechanical engineering. He also attended a graduate program at the Massachusetts Institute of Technology.

== Business background ==
Brendley founded Artis, a firm which uses high-speed sensing and massive parallel processing to build safety and defense systems, in 1999. One of the company's signature products is an active protection system called Iron Curtain, which defeats rocket-propelled grenades and other shoulder-launched threats using counter-munitions.

Previously, he worked at Noesis, Inc., a research and development firm later acquired by QinetiQ North America, where he set up the Advanced Real Time Information Systems (ARTIS) division. Prior to that, he served as vice president of the Defense Group, Inc., where he worked on information management and product development.

From 1994 to 1997, he was program manager at Sarcos Research Corp., and led several development projects, including a human exoskeletal program. From 1985 to 1994, he was senior analyst for the RAND Corporation, where he led teams of professionals engaged in various high-tech analytical projects. He helped establish the RAND Critical Technologies Institute, and led its first project on machine tools in support of White House science advisor.

From 1982 to 1984, he was an analyst with the System Planning Corporation; prior to that, he was a consultant at NASA's Ames Research Center, where he developed software.

== Patents and publications ==
Brendley holds several patents, and has authored or co-authored several books and studies. In October 1996, he co-wrote a book titled Shock and Awe: Achieving Rapid Dominance, published by the National Defense University Press. The book explores concepts for strategy, doctrine, operations and force structure to leverage technology for military superiority and dominance on the battlefield. He also co-wrote An Exploration of Integrated Ground Weapons Concepts for Armor/Anti-Armor Missions, a 1991 study which concluded that anti-armor vehicle concepts was achievable using then-available technology, and has authored several other publications while working for RAND.

== Personal and family ==
Brendley serves on the executive advisory board of the George Mason University Computer Game Design Program. He enjoys hiking and biking, and he and his wife Greta live in Falls Church, Virginia.
