= Jamaica Township, Vermilion County, Illinois =

Jamaica Township
- Township
- Location in Vermilion County
- Coordinates: 39°58′47″N 87°48′26″W
- Country: United States
- State: Illinois
- County: Vermilion
- Created: 1899

Area
  - Total: 31.32 sq mi (81.1 km^{2})
  - Land: 31.08 sq mi (80.5 km^{2})
  - Water: 0.24 sq mi (0.62 km^{2}) 0.77%
- Elevation: 676 ft (206 m)

Population (2010)
  - Estimate (2016): 195
  - Density: 6.5/sq mi (2.5/km^{2})
- Time zone: UTC-6 (CST)
  - Summer (DST): UTC-5 (CDT)
- FIPS code: 17-183-38180

Jamaica Township is a township in Vermilion County, Illinois, USA. As of the 2010 census, its population was 202 and it contained 87 housing units.

== History ==
Jamaica Township was created from portions of Catlin, Sidell, Carroll, and Vance Townships. The petition was filed in 1897, but the township wasn't approved until 1899 after a lengthy court battle, partly due to the excellent farmland in the area. The township was originally called Kingsley after a local chapel. Rob Weller lived there for 20 years. Later, local W. T. Baird suggested changing the name for Jamaica, Queens, a borough of New York City, which was named for a northeastern Algonquin Indian tribe.

== Geography ==
According to the 2010 census, the township has a total area of 31.32 square miles (81.1 km^{2}), of which 31.08 square miles (80.5 km^{2}) (or 99.23%) is land and 0.24 square miles (0.62 km^{2}) (or 0.77%) is water. The stream of Jordan Creek runs through this township.

=== Unincorporated towns ===
- Jamaica

=== Adjacent townships ===
- Catlin Township (northeast)
- Carroll Township (southeast)
- Sidell Township (southwest)
- Vance Township (northwest)

== Demographics ==
Historical population
Census	Pop.	Note	%±
2016 (est.)	195
U.S. Decennial Census
