= Kevin Koslofski =

American baseball player (born 1966)

- Outfielder
- Born: September 24, 1966 (age 59); Decatur, Illinois, U.S.
- Batted: Left Threw: Right

MLB debut
- June 28, 1992, for the Kansas City Royals

Last MLB appearance
- July 7, 1996, for the Milwaukee Brewers

MLB statistics
- Batting average: .244
- Home runs: 4
- Runs batted in: 21
- Stats at Baseball Reference

Teams
- Kansas City Royals (1992–1994); Milwaukee Brewers (1996)

Kevin Craig Koslofski (born September 24, 1966) is an American former professional baseball outfielder. He played in Major League Baseball (MLB) for the Kansas City Royals from 1992 to 1994 and the Milwaukee Brewers in 1996.

After attending Maroa-Forsyth High School in Maroa, Illinois, Koslofski was drafted and signed by the Royals in June 1984. He made his MLB debut eight years later on June 28, 1992, leading off for Kansas City and collecting three hits in a 9–2 victory over the Baltimore Orioles at Camden Yards.

Koslofski ended that 1992 season with three home runs and a batting average of .248. He batted only 30 times for the Royals over the next two seasons, however. He signed with Milwaukee as a free agent and appeared in 25 games for the Brewers in his final season, 1996.
