= Lincoln Prairie Conference =

- Conference: IHSA
- Founded: 2019
- No. of teams: 16
- Region: Central Illinois

The Lincoln Prairie Conference or LPC, is a high school athletic conference in Central Illinois. The first year of existence was the 2019-20 school year. Its schools belong to the IHSA and compete in many sports and other activities.

== History ==
The conference started in the 2019-20 school year and originally included Arcola, Argenta-Oreana, Arthur-Lovington-Atwood-Hammond, Bement, Blue Ridge, Cerro Gordo, Cumberland, Unity Christian, Heritage, Kansas, Oakland, Okaw Valley, Sangamon Valley, Shiloh, and Villa Grove all who left the Little Okaw Valley Conference. The 15 member schools left the Little Okaw Valley Conference due to far travel time and left out Martinsville, Hutsonville, Palestine and Oblong. On December 13, 2021 Sullivan High School accepted an invitation to join the Lincoln Prairie Conference beginning in the 2023-24 school year. In March of 2024, Cumberland announced its move to the National Trail Conference starting in the 2025-26 school year, but would remain in the LPC for football-only. In June of 2025, Fisher High School accepted an invitation to join the Lincoln Prairie Conference beginning in the 2026-27 school year.

== Member Schools ==
Lincoln Prairie Conference Members (clickable map)

There are 17 member schools in the Conference.

School	Location (Population)	Mascot	Colors	Affiliation	2025-26 9–12 enrollment	Year Joined	Previous Conference	School website
Arcola High School	Arcola, Illinois (2,916)	Purple Riders	Purple and White	Public	194	2019-20	Little Okaw Valley	http://www.arcola.k12.il.us/
Argenta-Oreana High School	Argenta, Illinois (947)	Bombers	Orange and Blue	Public	258	2019-20	Little Okaw Valley	https://www.argenta-oreana.org/
Arthur-Lovington-Atwood-Hammond High School	Arthur, Illinois (2,288)	Knights	Red and Gold	Public	296	2019-20	Little Okaw Valley	http://www.cusd305.org/
Bement High School	Bement, Illinois (1,730)	Bulldogs	Purple and White	Public	82	2019-20	Little Okaw Valley	https://www.bement.k12.il.us/
Blue Ridge High School	Farmer City, Illinois (2,037)	Knights	Blue and Silver	Public	154	2019-20	Little Okaw Valley	https://www.blueridge18.org/
Cerro Gordo High School	Cerro Gordo, Illinois (1,403)	Broncos	Navy and Orange	Public	114	2019-20	Little Okaw Valley	http://www.cgbroncos.org/?template=m
Cumberland High School	Toledo, Illinois (1,238)	Pirates	Blue and Gold	Public	292	2019-20	Little Okaw Valley	http://www.cumberland.k12.il.us/
Fisher High School	Fisher, Illinois (1,881)	Bunnies	Orange and Black	Public	195	2026-27	Heart of Illinois	https://www.fisherk12.org/
Heritage High School	Broadlands, Illinois (349)	Hawks	Navy, Silver and Red	Public	120	2019-20	Little Okaw Valley	https://heritage8.org/schools/heritage-high-school/
Kansas High School	Kansas, Illinois (787)	Titans	Purple, Orange and Blue	Public	51	2019-20	Little Okaw Valley	https://kansascusd3.com/
Oakland High School	Oakland, Illinois (880)	Titans	Purple, Orange and Blue	Public	59	2019-20	Little Okaw Valley	https://www.oakland5.org/?template=m
Okaw Valley High School	Bethany, Illinois (1,352)	Timberwolves	Blue, Black and Silver	Public	155	2019-20	Little Okaw Valley	https://www.okawvalley.org/
Sangamon Valley High School	Niantic, Illinois (707)	Storm	Navy and Silver	Public	195	2019-20	Little Okaw Valley	https://www.sangamonvalley.org/
Shiloh High School	Hume, Illinois (380)	Titans	Purple, Orange and Blue	Public	109	2019-20	Little Okaw Valley	http://www.shiloh1.us/
Sullivan High School	Sullivan, Illinois (4,413)	Redskins	Red and Black	Public	310	2023-24	Central Illinois	http://www.sullivan.k12.il.us/
Unity Christian School	Decatur, Illinois (76,122)	Lions	Red, White and Black	Private	128 / 211.20	2019-20	Little Okaw Valley	http://www.unitydecatur.org/
Villa Grove High School	Villa Grove, Illinois (2,537)	Blue Devils	Blue and Gold	Public	189	2019-20	Little Okaw Valley	http://www.vg302.org/

- Kansas, Oakland and Shiloh co-op to form the Tri-County Titans
  - Cerro Gordo and Bement co-op to form the Cerro Gordo-Bement Broncos

== Membership timeline ==
Full members Full members (non-football) Partial member (listed sports) Full members (8-man football) Full members (Football Coop) Central Illinois Conference Other Conference

== See also ==
- List of Illinois High School Association member conferences
