= Fairmount, Illinois =

Fairmount
- Village
- Location of Fairmount in Vermilion County, Illinois.

- Fairmount's location in Vermilion County
- Coordinates: 40°02′44″N 87°49′46″W
- Country: United States
- State: Illinois
- County: Vermilion
- Township: Vance
- Incorporated: 1863

Area
  - Total: 0.32 sq mi (0.82 km^{2})
  - Land: 0.32 sq mi (0.82 km^{2})
  - Water: 0 sq mi (0.00 km^{2})
- Elevation: 673 ft (205 m)

Population (2020)
  - Total: 612
  - Density: 1,927.9/sq mi (744.35/km^{2})
- Time zone: UTC-6 (CST)
  - Summer (DST): UTC-5 (CDT)
- ZIP code: 61841
- Area code: 217-733-2388
- FIPS code: 17-24985
- GNIS ID: 2398856
- Website: fairmountil.com

Fairmount is a village in Vance Township, Vermilion County, Illinois, United States. It is part of the Danville, Illinois Metropolitan Statistical Area. As of the 2020 census, Fairmount had a population of 612.

== History ==
Josiah Hunt, a railroad engineer, reportedly used inside information about the coming of the Great Western Railroad to purchase 40 acres (160,000 m^{2}) of land along the new route to found a town. He originally named the town Salina, but this was changed because of an existing Illinois town named Saline; Francis Dougherty, an early settler, is said to have selected the name Fairmount. The town was incorporated in 1863.

Coal mining was attempted east of Fairmount, but this proved to be impractical because of water. Later, Jacob C. Sandusky discovered an outcropping of limestone in his farm, and quarries were established which at one time employed about 400 people. The quarries are now flooded and make a popular fishing location.

== Geography ==
According to the 2010 census, Fairmount has a total area of 0.32 square miles (0.83 km^{2}), all land.

== Demographics ==
Historical population
Census	Pop.	Note	%±
1880	503		—
1890	649		29.0%
1900	928		43.0%
1910	847		−8.7%
1920	870		2.7%
1930	741		−14.8%
1940	775		4.6%
1950	618		−20.3%
1960	725		17.3%
1970	785		8.3%
1980	851		8.4%
1990	678		−20.3%
2000	640		−5.6%
2010	642		0.3%
2020	612		−4.7%
U.S. Decennial Census

As of the census of 2000, there were 640 people, 264 households, and 190 families residing in the village. The population density was 2,055.4 inhabitants per square mile (793.6/km^{2}). There were 280 housing units at an average density of 899.2 per square mile (347.2/km^{2}). The racial makeup of the village was 98.75% White, 0.31% African American, 0.16% Asian, 0.16% from other races, and 0.62% from two or more races. Hispanic or Latino of any race were 0.62% of the population.

There were 264 households, out of which 30.3% had children under the age of 18 living with them, 59.8% were married couples living together, 8.0% had a female householder with no husband present, and 27.7% were non-families. 25.4% of all households were made up of individuals, and 11.7% had someone living alone who was 65 years of age or older. The average household size was 2.42 and the average family size was 2.87.

In the village, the population was spread out, with 24.5% under the age of 18, 7.3% from 18 to 24, 26.1% from 25 to 44, 27.5% from 45 to 64, and 14.5% who were 5 years of age or older. The median age was 40 years. For every 100 females, there were 96.3 males. For every 100 females age 18 and over, there were 93.2 males.

The median income for a household in the village was $39,712, and the median income for a family was $48,125. Males had a median income of $31,761 versus $20,972 for females. The per capita income for the village was $16,691. About 8.5% of families and 9.5% of the population were below the poverty line, including 16.4% of those under age 18 and 2.2% of those age 65 or over.

== Transportation ==
Norfolk Southern Railway operates the railroad line that passes through Fairmount on its way from Danville to Decatur.

== Education ==
It is in the Salt Fork Community Unit School District 512.
