= Maroa-Forsyth High School =

Coordinates: 40.0355°N 88.9625°W

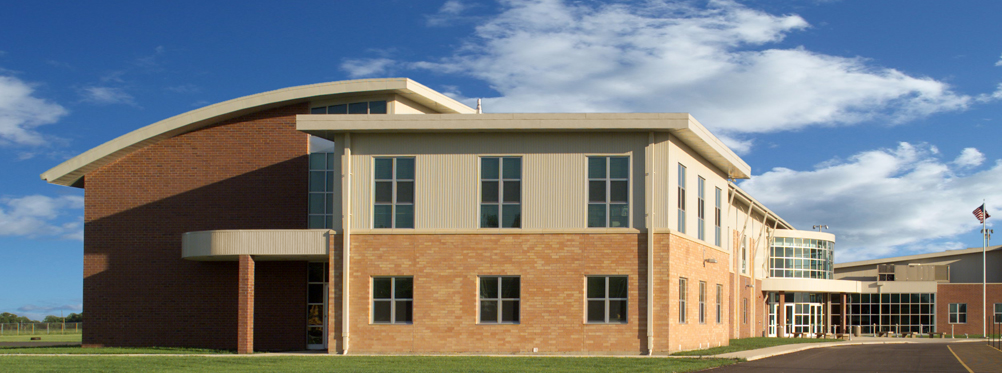

Location
- 610 W. Washington; Maroa, Macon County, Illinois 61756; United States

Information
- School type: Public secondary
- Motto: Excellence and Pride
- Opened: 1883
- School district: Maroa Forsyth CUSD 2
- NCES District ID: 172475002684
- Superintendent: John Ahlemeyer
- Principal: Brice Stewart
- Teaching staff: 23.95 (FTE)
- Grades: 9–12
- Gender: Coed
- Enrollment: 353 (2023–2024)
- Average class size: 14.1
- Student to teacher ratio: 14.74
- Colours: royal blue gold
- Athletics: IHSA
- Athletics conference: Sangamon Conference
- Team name: Trojans

Maroa-Forsyth High School (MFHS) is a four-year public high school located in Maroa, Illinois, United States. It is a part of the Maroa-Forsyth Community Unit School District 2. Maroa is located between Forsyth and Clinton and is near Bloomington. The school mascot is the Trojans and the school colors are blue and gold.

The school district (of which, this is the sole comprehensive high school) includes Maroa, most of Forsyth, and parts of Decatur.

== Notable alumni ==
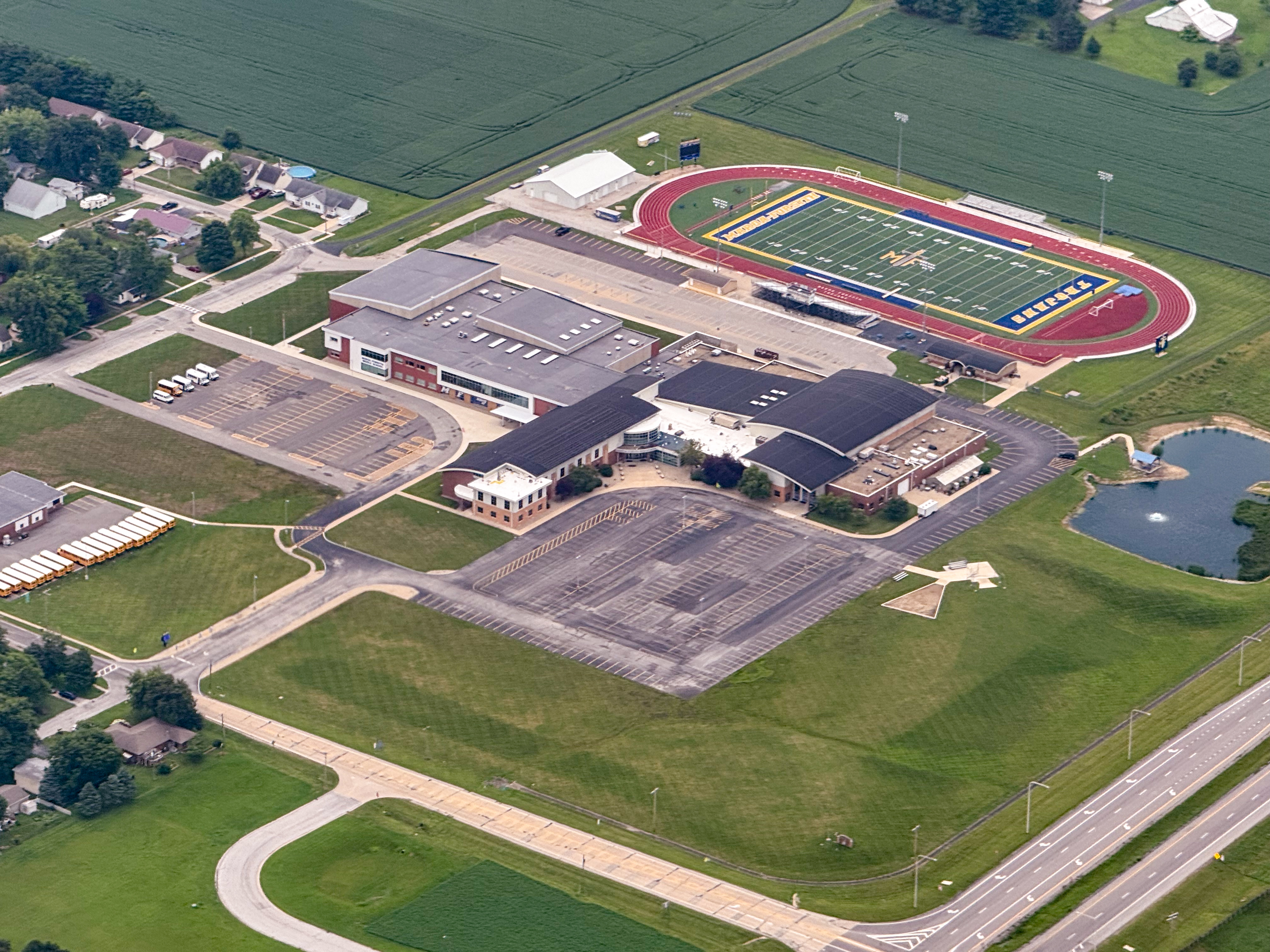
Aerial view of the school

- Kevin Koslofski, class of 1984, played Major League Baseball for the Kansas City Royals and Milwaukee Brewers
- Jeff Query, class of 1985, played for the Green Bay Packers
