= Shelbyville High School (Illinois) =

Location
- 1001 W.N. 6th Street; Shelbyville, Shelby, Illinois 62565; United States
- Coordinates: 39.4138°N 88.8045°W

Information
- Other name: SHS
- Type: Public
- School district: Shelbyville Community Unit School District 4
- Superintendent: Shane Schuricht
- NCES School ID: 173609003740
- Principal: Kyle Ladd
- Teaching staff: 27.01 (FTE)
- Grades: 9–12
- Gender: Co-educational
- Enrollment: 345 (2023–2024)
- Student to teacher ratio: 12.77
- Language: English
- Schedule type: Semester, daily
- Schedule: M–F except holidays
- Campus: Small town, rural
- Colors: Purple; White
- Athletics: IHSA
- Athletics conference: Central Illinois Conference
- Team name: Rams
- Accreditation: North Central Association of Colleges and Schools
- Website: https://www.shelbyville.k12.il.us/

Shelbyville High School is located in Shelbyville, Shelby County, Illinois, United States. It is a part of Community Unit School District 4. The school draws students from the towns of Shelbyville, Lakewood and Westervelt.

== Athletics ==
The schools participate in the Central Illinois Conference and are members of the Illinois High School Association.

=== Boys ===
- Baseball
- Basketball
- Cross country
- American football
- Golf
- Swimming and diving
- Tennis
- Track and field
- Wrestling

=== Girls ===
- Basketball
- Cheerleading
- Cross country
- Golf
- Softball
- Swimming and diving
- Tennis
- Track and field
- Volleyball

=== Notable team state finishes ===
- Boys' basketball: 1995–96 (1st), 1914–15 (3rd), 1917–18 (4th)
- Boys' cross country: 2015–16 (2nd), 2012–13 (3rd)
- Competitive cheering : 2005–06 (1st)
- Softball: 2010–11 (2nd)
- Volleyball: 1991–92 (2nd), 1983–84 and 2015–16 (4th)

== Notable alumni ==
- George A. Bowman, Wisconsin state assemblyman

== See also ==
- List of high schools in Illinois
