= Artis, LLC =

- Company type: Private
- Industry: Defense, Road Traffic Safety
- Founded: 1999; 27 years ago
- Headquarters: Herndon, Virginia, United States
- Key people: Keith Brendley (president); Brian Detter (executive vice president
- Products: Iron Curtain active protection system, R&D products, safety systems
- Website: artisllc.com

Artis, LLC is a research and development company located in Herndon, Virginia. Founded in 1999, the company provides services and creates products for defense and commercial markets using extremely high-speed sensing and parallel processing. The name of the company stems from an acronym, short for "advanced real-time information systems."

== Products ==
One of the company's products is Iron Curtain, an active protection system designed to defeat attacks from rocket-propelled grenades, tandem RPGs and other recoilless rifle systems. In April 2013, it was reported the company achieved a perfect score during U.S. government testing.

The company also features SmartMat, which is designed to monitor pedestrian traffic such as counting humans walking in and out of buildings or to and from events. Funded by the Centers for Disease Control and Prevention, the Smartmat system connects to the Internet for ease of tracking and can run off battery or AC.

== Services ==
Artis provides software design, simulation and modeling, engineering and other high-speed analytical and design services for safety and defense applications. Some of the areas being developed include active protection systems, digital armor, underbelly IED blast mitigation, robotics and motion detection, and highway worker safety systems.
