= Meridian High School (Macon, Illinois) =

Coordinates: 39°42′10.1″N 88°59′48.3″W

Location
- 728 S. Wall Street P.O. Box 380; Macon, Macon County, Illinois 62544; United States

Information
- Type: Public
- Teaching staff: 23.25 (FTE)
- Grades: 9-12
- Enrollment: 307 (2023–2024)
- Student to teacher ratio: 13.20
- Language: English
- Campus: Small town, Rural
- Colors: Green; Silver; Black
- Athletics: IHSA
- Athletics conference: Central Illinois Conference
- Mascot: Hawk
- Team name: Hawks
- Accreditation: North Central Association of Colleges and Schools
- Website: http://www.meridianhawks.net/

Meridian High School is a public four-year high school located in Macon, Illinois. A part of the Meridian Community Unit School District 15, it is located about 9 miles (14 km) south of Decatur, Illinois. Its first year of existence was the fall of 1994, when it was formed by the merger of the Macon School District (1927–1994) and the Blue Mound School District (1917–1994). It is now part of the Meridian Community School District #15, which includes Meridian Middle School (grades 6-8) and Meridian High School (grades 9–12) in Macon, and Meridian Elementary School (grades Pre-K-5) in Blue Mound.

The Meridian school district includes the towns of Macon, Blue Mound, Boody, Elwin, and some areas in the southern tip of Decatur.

In 2011, with the help of a one percent sales tax increase for Macon County and a grant from the state of Illinois, Meridian residents decided to change the Macon and Blue Mound campuses. Meridian High School would become the new Meridian Jr./Sr. High School, housing grades 6–12. A new wing and gym would be added, and a new football and baseball field would be constructed. Meridian Middle School would be torn down (except for the gymnasium) and a new school constructed in its place which would serve as the new elementary school (Pre-K–5).

== Sports ==
On June 4, 1971, the Macon Ironmen baseball team finished in second place at the Illinois High School Association Boys Baseball Championship Tournament. The story of this feat has been retold in a 2012 book titled “One Shot at Forever: A Small Town, an Unlikely Coach, and a Magical Baseball Season” by Sports Illustrated writer Chris Ballard. Brian Snitker, a member of that team, would go on to win the 2021 World Series as manager of the Atlanta Braves.

In November 1986, the Macon Ironmen football team took second place in the IHSA Class 1A State Playoffs.

In November 1999, the Meridian Hawks placed second in the IHSA 2A Football Championship.

On May 27, 2006, Meridian Hawks' Rodney Oyler was the first individual IHSA Boys State Champion in the open 800-meter run.

On March 14, 2009, Meridian Hawks won the IHSA Boys Class 1A Basketball Championship.

On May 20, 2023, Meridian Hawks' Kaylin Moreland was the champion of the 100-meter dash at the IHSA 1A Girls State Track & Field Championships.

== Notable alumni ==
- Dale Connelly, who succeeded Garrison Keillor as co-host of Minnesota Public Radio's Morning Show, is a 1973 graduate of Macon High School
- Lauren Doyle, represented the United States of America for Rugby sevens at the 2016 Summer Olympics
- Brian Snitker, 2021 World Series winning manager of the Atlanta Braves, member of the 1971 Mod Squad, and a 1973 graduate of Macon High School
- Toby Towson, NCAA Gymnastics Champion, coach and dancer, a 1965 graduate of Macon High School.
