= Chris Ballard (journalist) =

Sports journalist

- Born: December 13, 1973 (age 52); United States
- Occupation: Sports journalist

Chris Ballard (born December 13, 1973) is an American sports journalist and a senior writer at Sports Illustrated.

Ballard has written books on a variety of sport subjects, including Hoops Nation, which was named one of Booklist's Top Ten Sports Books of 1998, and The Art of a Beautiful Game: the Thinking Fan's Tour of the NBA.

== Career ==
Ballard joined Sports Illustrated in September 2000 after working as a sports journalist at the Courier-Post in Camden, New Jersey. His 2012 book, One Shot at Forever: A Small Town, an Unlikely Coach, and a Magical Baseball Season chronicles the story of the baseball team, the Macon Ironmen in Macon, Illinois during its improbable run to the 1971 Illinois state baseball championship tournament. In the October 22, 2012 edition of Sports Illustrated, Ballard wrote a feature article that once again focused on a small town high school baseball team and in particular, the coach, David Warrenfeltz. The story described events that affected the Williamsport, Maryland team in early 2012 when the team’s star pitcher and his girlfriend were killed in an automobile accident. Despite the loss, the team rallied around its coach and proceeded to win the Maryland state high school championship. The 25-year-old Warrenfeltz was also a close friend and Williamsport High School teammate of former Los Angeles Angels pitcher Nick Adenhart who was killed in an auto accident in 2009.

Ballard has also written feature articles for USA Today and The New York Times. Ballard graduated from Pomona College and currently resides in Berkeley, California with his wife and children.

== Works ==
- The Plunge, Simon & Schuster, 2026. ISBN 9781668055861
- One Shot at Forever, Grand Central Publishing, 2013. ISBN 9781401312664
- The Art of a Beautiful Game, Simon & Schuster, 2010. ISBN 9781439110225
- Hoops Nation, Holt Paperbacks, 1998. ISBN 978-0805048773
