= Sidell, Illinois =

Sidell
- Village
- Location of Sidell in Vermilion County, Illinois.

- Sidell's location in Vermilion County
- Coordinates: 39°54′35″N 87°49′25″W
- Country: United States
- State: Illinois
- County: Vermilion
- Township: Sidell

Area
  - Total: 0.93 sq mi (2.40 km^{2})
  - Land: 0.93 sq mi (2.40 km^{2})
  - Water: 0 sq mi (0.00 km^{2})
- Elevation: 679 ft (207 m)

Population (2020)
  - Total: 489
  - Density: 527.7/sq mi (203.74/km^{2})
- Time zone: UTC-6 (CST)
  - Summer (DST): UTC-5 (CDT)
- ZIP code: 61876
- Area code: 217
- FIPS code: 17-69836
- GNIS ID: 2399819

Sidell is a village in Sidell Township, Vermilion County, Illinois, United States. It is part of the Danville, Illinois Metropolitan Statistical Area. As of the 2020 census, Sidell had a population of 489.

== History ==
Both the town and the township of Sidell were named after John Sidell, who came to the area from Ohio in 1861 and purchased 3,000 acres (12 km^{2}) on the banks of the Little Vermilion River. In 1888, the town had three main industries aside from farming: tiles, bricks and ice.

== Geography ==
According to the 2010 census, Sidell has a total area of 0.93 square miles (2.41 km^{2}), all land.

== Demographics ==
Historical population
Census	Pop.	Note	%±
1900	776		—
1910	741		−4.5%
1920	800		8.0%
1930	655		−18.1%
1940	653		−0.3%
1950	554		−15.2%
1960	614		10.8%
1970	645		5.0%
1980	625		−3.1%
1990	584		−6.6%
2000	626		7.2%
2010	617		−1.4%
2020	489		−20.7%
U.S. Decennial Census

At the time of the 2000 census, there were 626 people, 237 households and 182 families residing in the village. The population density was 674.7 inhabitants per square mile (260.5/km^{2}). There were 250 housing units at an average density of 269.5 per square mile (104.1/km^{2}). The racial makeup of the village was 99.68% White, 0.16% African American and 0.16% Native American. Hispanic or Latino of any race were 0.64% of the population.

There were 237 households, of which 38.0% had children under the age of 18 living with them, 62.0% were married couples living together, 7.2% had a female householder with no husband present, and 23.2% were non-families. 19.8% of all households were made up of individuals, and 11.0% had someone living alone who was 65 years of age or older. The average household size was 2.64 and the average family size was 3.00.

28.8% of the population were under the age of 18, 6.4% from 18 to 24, 30.4% from 25 to 44, 21.1% from 45 to 64, and 13.4% who were 65 years of age or older. The median age was 36 years. For every 100 females, there were 100.0 males. For every 100 females age 18 and over, there were 100.9 males.

The median household income was $31,923 and the median family income was $39,792. Males had a median income of $30,192 compared $19,792 for females. The per capita income for the village was $15,061. About 7.7% of families and 9.6% of the population were below the poverty line, including 6.7% of those under age 18 and 10.1% of those age 65 or over.

== Education ==
It is in the Salt Fork Community Unit School District 512.
