= St. Teresa High School (Decatur, Illinois) =

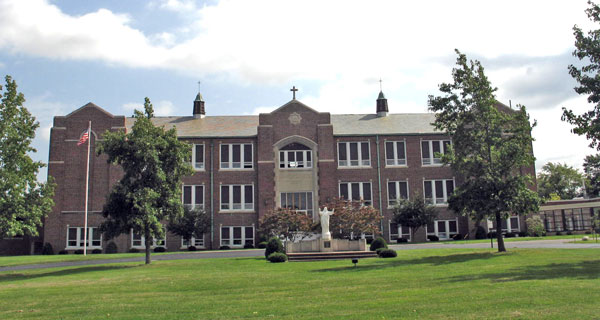
- St. Teresa High School, Decatur, Illinois

Location
- 2710 North Water Street; Decatur, Illinois 62526; United States; 39°52′21″N 88°57′14″W

Information
- Type: Private
- Motto: Serviam (I will serve.)
- Denomination: Roman Catholic
- Patron saint: St. Teresa of Ávila
- Established: 1866
- Founder: Ursuline Sisters
- Oversight: Diocese of Springfield
- CEEB code: 141565
- President: Dr. Kenneth C. Hendriksen
- Principal: Mr. Matt Snyder
- Grades: 9–12
- Gender: Coed
- Enrollment: 245 (2024)
- Average class size: 14
- Campus size: 21 acres (8.5 ha)
- Campus type: Closed
- Colors: Orange; Blue
- Slogan: College Prep. Life Ready.
- Athletics: IHSA
- Athletics conference: Independent
- Mascot: Bulldog
- Team name: Bulldogs
- Accreditation: North Central Association of Colleges and Schools
- Publication: "Bulldog Biz" (newsletter)
- Yearbook: Teresian
- Tuition: $8,000 (2023-2024)
- Website: www.stteresa.org

St. Teresa High School is a private, Roman Catholic high school in Decatur, Illinois. It is located in the Roman Catholic Diocese of Springfield in Illinois.

== History ==
St. Teresa was established in 1866 as Academy of St. Teresa by the Sisters of the Holy Names of Jesus and Mary. In 1868 the Ursuline Sisters took over the responsibility of operating the school. St. Teresa was originally located on the 400 block of East Eldorado Street, until 1913, when it was moved to its current location and designated as an all-girls boarding school.

In 1930, due to increases in student enrollment, the Ursuline Sisters petitioned Bishop Griffin for an expansion of the academy. Bishop Griffin fulfilled their request, and in return the nuns were asked to build a co-ed building. After the transition into a co-educational institution, the school was renamed as St. Teresa High School and Sister Loretto Boland was appointed as the first principal. In 1955, as enrollment further increased, eight classrooms and a gymnasium were built and dedicated to Bishop O'Connor.

In 1996, the Ursuline Sisters withdrew their sponsorship of the school and a not-for-profit corporation was formed to assume ownership and control of St. Teresa High School.

In 2015, a new athletic wing was built, containing new locker rooms and an exercise/weight lifting room. Its construction was possible by donations and had its first use in the 2015-2016 school year.

Starting in 2016, St. Teresa launched its "Sustain the Future" Campaign, which aims to raise $10.5 million, of which over $7 million has been raised.

In 2022, a new football and track complex was constructed, with a new synthetic turf football field, and the addition of a track, which the school did not have before. The project budget was $4.25 million.

== Approach ==
St. Teresa High School requires that each student earn a total of twenty-six credits (defined as one year of coursework) to graduate, including four from theology and English and three from mathematics and science. Other required courses include consumer education, computer concepts, and health. St. Teresa High School also requires ten service hours to the community per school year, and students must pass the Illinois and U.S. Constitution Tests. Many honors courses are available to students in math, chemistry, English, biology, anatomy, and physics. Several AP classes are also available: Calculus AB and BC, Physics 1, Biology, and US History. Seventh and eighth graders from the three Catholic schools in the area (Holy Family, St. Patrick, and Our Lady of Lourdes) can take advanced math and science on campus.

95% of students take part in extracurricular activities or athletics (listed below), including Student Council, Scholastic Bowl, ACES (Academic Challenge for Engineering and Science), FBLA (Future Business Leaders of America), National Honor Society, Drama (with two major productions each school year), and Key Club International. Students also take part in the various clubs formed at the school, such as Art Club and International Club.

== Campus ==
The current campus is one building in three parts. The science wing, which also includes the music room, chapel, and multipurpose room, is on the south side. A glass hallway separates it from the main building, which contains the majority of the classrooms and offices. The athletic wing, including the Joe Venturi gymnasium, locker rooms, weight room, and a few classrooms, is on the north side. To the east of the school are the football field, (doubling as a soccer pitch), track, press box, and baseball diamond. The softball diamond is to the south of the school. Students must remain on campus throughout the school day.

== Athletics ==
Depending upon the sport, St. Teresa competes in IHSA Class 1A or 2A (sometimes styled as A or AA) and always competes in the IHSA Central Illinois Conference. The school offers football and baseball for boys, volleyball, softball, and cheerleading for girls, and cross country, tennis, track and field, basketball, soccer, bass fishing and golf for both.

=== IHSA state finishes ===
| Sport | IHSA state finishes |
|---|---|
| Football | 2A state champions – 1974, 1975, 1979, 2022; 2A state runner-up – 1986; 1A state runner-up – 2016 |
| Volleyball | 2A state champions – 2019; 1A state 3rd place – 2018; 2A 4th place – 2010, 2011 |
| Boys cross country (ind.) | 1A 4th place – 2018 |
| Girls cross country | 1A state champions – 2010, 2011, 2012, 2013; 1A state runner-up – 2009; 1A state 3rd place – 2005 |
| Girls tennis (doubles) | 1A state runners-up – 2010, 2013; 1A state 3rd place – 2011; 1A state 4th place – 2012 |
| Girls track & field | 1A state 3rd place – 2018, 2019 |
| Boys basketball | 2A state runners-up – 2015 |
| Girls basketball | 1A state champions – 2004 |
| Boys soccer | 1A state 3rd place – 2018 |
| Scholastic bowl | 1A state champions – 1997; 1A state runners-up – 1998, 2016; 1A state 3rd place – 2005 |

== Alumni ==
- Jacardia Wright, NFL Running back for the Seattle Seahawks
- Nathan H. Lents, scientist and author
- Noelle Malkamaki, Paralympic athlete
- Del Unser, Former MLB player (Washington Senators, Cleveland Indians, Philadelphia Phillies, New York Mets, Montreal Expos)
- Lorinne Dills Vozoff, actress, director, playwright, and acting teacher
