= Newman Township, Douglas County, Illinois =

Newman Township
- Township
- Location in Douglas County

- Douglas County's location in Illinois
- Coordinates: 39°49′43″N 87°59′19″W
- Country: United States
- State: Illinois
- County: Douglas
- Established: November 5, 1867

Area
  - Total: 40.75 sq mi (105.5 km^{2})
  - Land: 40.71 sq mi (105.4 km^{2})
  - Water: 0.05 sq mi (0.13 km^{2}) 0.12%
- Elevation: 646 ft (197 m)

Population (2020)
  - Total: 1,024
  - Density: 25.15/sq mi (9.712/km^{2})
- Time zone: UTC-6 (CST)
  - Summer (DST): UTC-5 (CDT)
- ZIP codes: 61810, 61852, 61942
- FIPS code: 17-041-52636

Newman Township is one of nine townships in Douglas County, Illinois, USA. As of the 2020 census, its population was 1,024 and it contained 489 housing units.

== Geography ==
According to the 2021 census gazetteer files, Newman Township has a total area of 40.75 square miles (105.54 km^{2}), of which 40.71 square miles (105.44 km^{2}) (or 99.88%) is land and 0.05 square miles (0.13 km^{2}) (or 0.12%) is water.

=== Cities, towns, villages ===
- Newman

=== Cemeteries ===
The township contains Pleasant Ridge Cemetery.

=== Major highways ===
- U.S. Route 36
- Illinois Route 49

== Demographics ==
As of the 2020 census there were 1,024 people, 432 households, and 294 families residing in the township. The population density was 25.13 inhabitants per square mile (9.70/km^{2}). There were 489 housing units at an average density of 12.00 per square mile (4.63/km^{2}). The racial makeup of the township was 92.38% White, 0.88% African American, 0.20% Native American, 0.49% Asian, 0.00% Pacific Islander, 0.98% from other races, and 5.08% from two or more races. Hispanic or Latino of any race were 3.61% of the population.

There were 432 households, out of which 13.20% had children under the age of 18 living with them, 63.89% were married couples living together, 2.55% had a female householder with no spouse present, and 31.94% were non-families. 26.60% of all households were made up of individuals, and 10.00% had someone living alone who was 65 years of age or older. The average household size was 1.98 and the average family size was 2.35.

The township's age distribution consisted of 12.0% under the age of 18, 2.1% from 18 to 24, 15.5% from 25 to 44, 23.3% from 45 to 64, and 47.1% who were 65 years of age or older. The median age was 62.0 years. For every 100 females, there were 88.7 males. For every 100 females age 18 and over, there were 85.5 males.

The median income for a household in the township was $58,077, and the median income for a family was $63,956. Males had a median income of $36,667 versus $26,458 for females. The per capita income for the township was $29,045. About 7.1% of families and 11.8% of the population were below the poverty line, including 21.8% of those under age 18 and 2.5% of those age 65 or over.

Historical population
Census	Pop.	Note	%±
1930	1,728		—
1940	1,650		−4.5%
1950	1,621		−1.8%
1960	1,551		−4.3%
1970	1,353		−12.8%
1980	1,391		2.8%
1990	1,248		−10.3%
2000	1,203		−3.6%
2010	1,080		−10.2%
2020	1,024		−5.2%
U.S. Decennial Census

== School districts ==
- Heritage Community Unit School District 8
- Shiloh Community Unit School District 1

== Political districts ==
- State House District 110
- State Senate District 55
