= Ogden Township, Champaign County, Illinois =

Ogden Township
- Township
- Location in Champaign County

- Champaign County's location in Illinois
- Coordinates: 40°08′49″N 87°58′17″W
- Country: United States
- State: Illinois
- County: Champaign

Area
  - Total: 37.62 sq mi (97.4 km^{2})
  - Land: 37.59 sq mi (97.4 km^{2})
  - Water: 0.03 sq mi (0.078 km^{2}) 0.08%
- Elevation: 673 ft (205 m)

Population (2020)
  - Total: 1,531
  - Density: 40.73/sq mi (15.73/km^{2})
- Time zone: UTC-6 (CST)
  - Summer (DST): UTC-5 (CDT)
- FIPS code: 17-019-55288

Ogden Township is a township in Champaign County, Illinois, United States. As of the 2020 census, its population was 1,531 and it contained 683 housing units.

== History ==
Ogden Township was formed from a portion of South Homer Township on an unknown date.

== Geography ==
Ogden is parts of Townships 19 and 20 North, Range 11 East of the Third Principal Meridian and part of Range 14 West of the Second Principal Meridian. When the federal township land surveys were done in 1821 one group of surveyors went west from the Second Principal Meridian and another went east from the Third Principal Meridian. Both groups used rawhide measuring lines that expanded and contracted with the weather. When the two groups met in eastern Champaign County the surveys didn't agree, resulting in double section numbers in the eastern townships and ongoing property line confusion among landowners.

According to the 2010 census, the township has a total area of 37.62 square miles (97.4 km^{2}), of which 37.59 square miles (97.4 km^{2}) (or 99.92%) is land and 0.03 square miles (0.078 km^{2}) (or 0.08%) is water.

=== Cities and towns ===
- Ogden
- Royal

=== Unincorporated towns ===
(This list is based on USGS data and may include former settlements.)

=== Cemeteries ===
The township contains three cemeteries: Saint John Lutheran, Saint Joseph and Stearns.

=== Major highways ===
- Interstate 74
- U.S. Route 150
- Illinois State Route 49

== Demographics ==
As of the 2020 census there were 1,531 people, 653 households, and 448 families residing in the township. The population density was 40.69 inhabitants per square mile (15.71/km^{2}). There were 683 housing units at an average density of 18.15 per square mile (7.01/km^{2}). The racial makeup of the township was 96.47% White, 0.20% African American, 0.00% Native American, 0.39% Asian, 0.00% Pacific Islander, 0.65% from other races, and 2.29% from two or more races. Hispanic or Latino of any race were 1.05% of the population.

There were 653 households, out of which 32.90% had children under the age of 18 living with them, 57.73% were married couples living together, 6.58% had a female householder with no spouse present, and 31.39% were non-families. 26.20% of all households were made up of individuals, and 15.80% had someone living alone who was 65 years of age or older. The average household size was 2.62 and the average family size was 3.23.

The township's age distribution consisted of 25.8% under the age of 18, 6.1% from 18 to 24, 24.1% from 25 to 44, 23.3% from 45 to 64, and 20.8% who were 65 years of age or older. The median age was 37.8 years. For every 100 females, there were 90.0 males. For every 100 females age 18 and over, there were 92.0 males.

The median income for a household in the township was $74,931, and the median income for a family was $104,500. Males had a median income of $55,875 versus $42,917 for females. The per capita income for the township was $34,593. About 2.9% of families and 4.8% of the population were below the poverty line, including 5.9% of those under age 18 and 7.3% of those age 65 or over.

Historical population
Census	Pop.	Note	%±
2010	1,680		—
2020	1,531		−8.9%
U.S. Decennial Census
