= Tuscola Community High School =

Location
- 500 S Prairie Street; Tuscola, Illinois 61953; United States
- 39.7956°N 88.2741°W

Information
- Other name: TCHS
- Type: Public high school
- Established: 1870s
- School district: Tuscola Community Unit School District 301
- NCES School ID: 173960004001
- Teaching staff: 23.50 (FTE)
- Grades: 9–12
- Enrollment: 299 (2024-2025)
- Student to teacher ratio: 12.60
- Colors: Black and gold
- Athletics: IHSA
- Athletics conference: Central Illinois Conference
- Nickname: Warriors
- Rival: Arcola High School (Cola Wars)
- Accreditation: North Central Association of Colleges and Schools
- Yearbook: Tuscolian
- Website: www.cusd301.org/o/tchs

Tuscola Community High School (TCHS) is a public high school in Tuscola, Illinois, United States. It is part of the Tuscola Community Unit School District 301.

== History ==
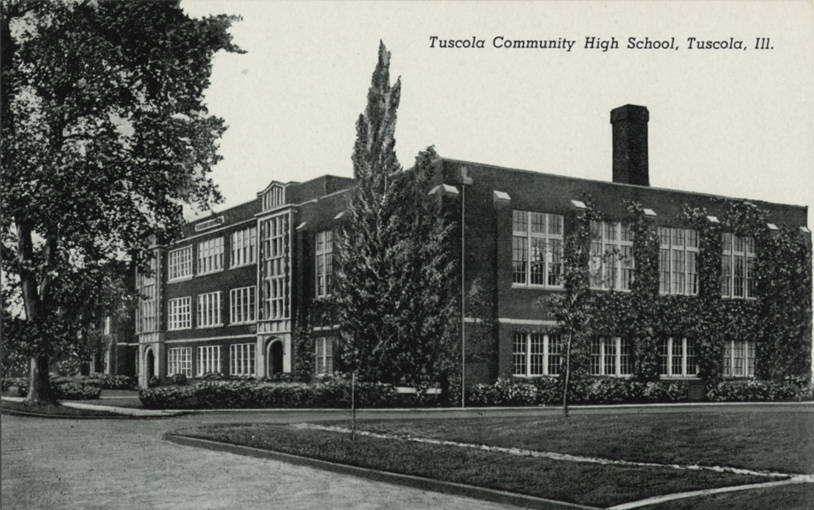
Postcard of the school, 1938.

High school in Tuscola dates back to the early 1870s, when it occupied the third floor of the Tuscola Union School; the first high school graduation was in 1875. After the Union School burned on October 12, 1921, high school was held at the courthouse.

The first building solely for Tuscola High School was opened October 2, 1922, bounded by Sale, Niles, Overton and Indiana Streets. That building was then used from 1957 to January 1969 as a grade school, after the newer high school was opened in November 1957, bounded by Daggy, VanAllen, and Prairie Streets.

The high school became part of Tuscola Community Unit School District 301 in the 1940s when the unit district was approved by public referendum.

== Athletics ==
Tuscola's High School athletes participate in the Central Illinois Conference and are members of the Illinois High School Association. There is a broad range of sporting activities in which the students participate, currently offering six sports for boys: baseball, basketball, cross country, football, golf, track and field as well as seven sports for girls: basketball, cheer, cross country, golf, softball, track and field, and volleyball.

=== Athletic honors ===
- Boys Football: 2006–07 & 2009–10 (1st), 2007–08, 2010–11, 2011–12, 2017–18 (2nd)
- Boys Baseball: 2011–12 (2nd), 2017–18 (3rd), 2007–08 (4th)
- Boys Basketball: 2022-23 (3rd)
- Boys Cross Country: 2023-24 (1st)
- Boys Track: 2023-24 & 2024-25 (2nd), 2007–08 & 2013–14 (3rd)
- Girls Softball: 2011-12 (4th)
- Girls Track: 2021-22 (1st), 1992–93, 2023–24, 2024-25 (2nd), 2022-23 (3rd)

== Extracurricular activities ==
TCHS offers both band and chorus programs, as well as competitive quizzing.

== Notable alumni ==
- Linda Metheny, Olympic gymnast
- Fred Wakefield, NFL player
- Gary Forrester, author.
- Philip Deaver, author.
