= Maroa, Illinois =

- City
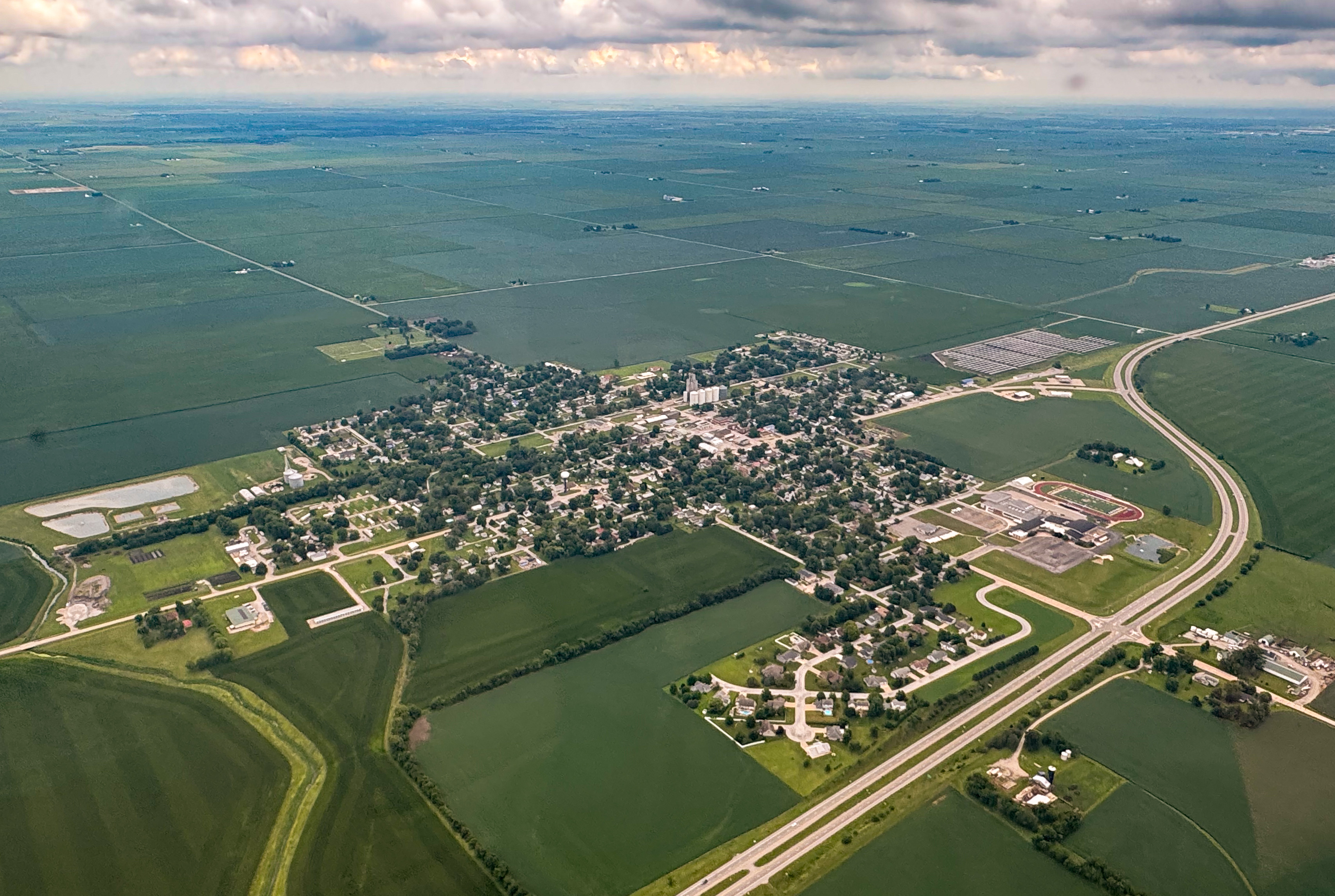
- Aerial view of Maroa
- Motto: A great place to call home
- Location in Macon County, Illinois

- Location in the United States
- Coordinates: 40°02′11″N 88°57′22″W
- Country: United States
- State: Illinois
- County: Macon
- Township: Maroa

Area
  - Total: 1.76 sq mi (4.57 km^{2})
  - Land: 1.76 sq mi (4.57 km^{2})
  - Water: 0 sq mi (0.00 km^{2})
- Elevation: 728 ft (222 m)

Population (2020)
  - Total: 1,577
  - Density: 893.8/sq mi (345.11/km^{2})
- Time zone: UTC-6 (CST)
  - Summer (DST): UTC-5 (CDT)
- ZIP code: 61756
- Area code: 217
- FIPS code: 17-47072
- GNIS feature ID: 2395015
- Website: maroaillinois.gov

Maroa is a city in Macon County, Illinois, United States. Its population was 1,577 at the 2020 census, down from 1,801 in 2010. It is included in the Decatur, Illinois Metropolitan Statistical Area.

== History ==
The city was named after the Maroa people.

The first settler of the township was James Pettyjohn, who came from Kentucky and settled in 1839. The next group of settlers came from Ohio, Indiana, and Tennessee. The first schoolhouse was built in 1852. Maroa at one time was the second largest township, besides county seat Decatur, as it sat at the junction of both the Illinois Central Railroad and the Midland Railroad Company.

Maroa was officially incorporated as a town on March 7, 1867.

== Geography ==
Maroa is located in northern Macon County. Its northern boundary is the DeWitt County line. U.S. Route 51 passes through the west side of the city, leading south 13 miles (21 km) to Decatur and north 8 miles (13 km) to Clinton.

According to the U.S. Census Bureau, Maroa has a total area of 1.76 square miles (4.56 km^{2}), all land. The headwaters of the North Fork, a west-flowing tributary of the Lake Fork and part of the Sangamon River watershed, pass through the northern part of the city.

On January 3, 2023, An EF1 tornado with estimated peak winds of 110 miles per hour hit the northwest outskirts of Maroa. The tornado damaged silos and caused minor shingle damage to 2 homes.

== Demographics ==
Historical population
Census	Pop.	Note	%±
1870	766		—
1880	870		13.6%
1890	1,164		33.8%
1900	1,213		4.2%
1910	1,160		−4.4%
1920	1,193		2.8%
1930	1,154		−3.3%
1940	1,033		−10.5%
1950	1,100		6.5%
1960	1,235		12.3%
1970	1,467		18.8%
1980	1,760		20.0%
1990	1,602		−9.0%
2000	1,654		3.2%
2010	1,801		8.9%
2020	1,577		−12.4%
U.S. Decennial Census

=== 2020 census ===
As of the 2020 census, Maroa had a population of 1,577. The median age was 40.4 years. 25.5% of residents were under the age of 18 and 16.6% of residents were 65 years of age or older. For every 100 females there were 97.9 males, and for every 100 females age 18 and over there were 96.5 males age 18 and over.

0.0% of residents lived in urban areas, while 100.0% lived in rural areas.

There were 634 households in Maroa, of which 35.6% had children under the age of 18 living in them. Of all households, 50.5% were married-couple households, 18.3% were households with a male householder and no spouse or partner present, and 23.5% were households with a female householder and no spouse or partner present. About 24.3% of all households were made up of individuals and 10.6% had someone living alone who was 65 years of age or older.

There were 704 housing units, of which 9.9% were vacant. The homeowner vacancy rate was 2.4% and the rental vacancy rate was 8.6%.

Racial composition as of the 2020 census
Race	Number	Percent
White	1,480	93.8%
Black or African American	12	0.8%
American Indian and Alaska Native	2	0.1%
Asian	11	0.7%
Native Hawaiian and Other Pacific Islander	0	0.0%
Some other race	5	0.3%
Two or more races	67	4.2%
Hispanic or Latino (of any race)	15	1.0%

=== 2000 census ===
As of the census of 2000, there were 1,654 people, 651 households, and 477 families residing in the city. The population density was 2,456.2 inhabitants per square mile (948.3/km^{2}). There were 711 housing units at an average density of 1,055.8 per square mile (407.6/km^{2}). The racial makeup of the city was 99.27% White, 0.18% African American, 0.06% Native American, 0.06% Asian, 0.18% from other races, and 0.24% from two or more races. Hispanic or Latino people of any race were 0.91% of the population.

There were 651 households, out of which 35.0% had children under the age of 18 living with them, 60.5% were married couples living together, 9.7% had a female householder with no husband present, and 26.6% were non-families. 23.7% of all households were made up of individuals, and 11.8% had someone living alone who was 65 years of age or older. The average household size was 2.54 and the average family size was 3.00.

In the city, the population was spread out, with 27.4% under the age of 18, 7.6% from 18 to 24, 30.0% from 25 to 44, 22.1% from 45 to 64, and 12.9% who were 65 years of age or older. The median age was 37 years. For every 100 females, there were 100.5 males. For every 100 females age 18 and over, there were 93.1 males.

The median income for a household in the city was $41,615, and the median income for a family was $46,908. Males had a median income of $38,274 versus $20,809 for females. The per capita income for the city was $18,308. About 3.0% of families and 4.4% of the population were below the poverty line, including 3.9% of those under age 18 and 4.7% of those age 65 or over.

== Education ==
Maroa is the home to Maroa-Forsyth High School.

== Notable people ==
- Kevin Koslofski, Major League Baseball player for the Kansas City Royals
- Dean O'Banion, 1920s Irish-American mobster
- Jeff Query, football wide receiver with Green Bay Packers; played football at Millikin University
