= Macon, Illinois =

- City
- Location in Macon County, Illinois
- Coordinates: 39°42′33″N 89°00′02″W
- Country: United States
- State: Illinois
- County: Macon
- Township: South Macon

Area
  - Total: 1.45 sq mi (3.76 km^{2})
  - Land: 1.45 sq mi (3.76 km^{2})
  - Water: 0 sq mi (0.00 km^{2})
- Elevation: 712 ft (217 m)

Population (2020)
  - Total: 1,177
  - Density: 811.4/sq mi (313.27/km^{2})
- Time zone: UTC-6 (CST)
  - Summer (DST): UTC-5 (CDT)
- ZIP code: 62544
- Area code: 217
- FIPS code: 17-45941
- GNIS feature ID: 2395802
- Website: maconcity.us

Macon is a city in Macon County, Illinois, United States whose population was 1,177 at the 2020 census. It is included in the Decatur, Illinois Metropolitan Statistical Area and lies 9 miles (14 km) south of Decatur.

== History ==
The city was named after Nathaniel Macon (1758–1837), American politician.

It was originally plotted in 1856 on land owned by the Illinois Central Railroad. Macon was officially incorporated as a city on April 19, 1869.

== Geography ==
Macon is located in southern Macon County.

According to the 2021 census gazetteer files, Macon has a total area of 1.45 square miles (3.76 km^{2}), all land.

=== Major highways ===
- U.S. Highway 51 leads north 9 miles (14 km) to Decatur, the Macon county seat, and south 25 miles (40 km) to Pana.

== Demographics ==
Historical population
Census	Pop.	Note	%±
1880	793		—
1890	819		3.3%
1900	705		−13.9%
1910	683		−3.1%
1920	788		15.4%
1930	800		1.5%
1940	875		9.4%
1950	942		7.7%
1960	1,229		30.5%
1970	1,249		1.6%
1980	1,300		4.1%
1990	1,282		−1.4%
2000	1,213		−5.4%
2010	1,138		−6.2%
2020	1,177		3.4%
U.S. Decennial Census

As of the 2020 census there were 1,177 people, 439 households, and 318 families residing in the city. The population density was 811.16 inhabitants per square mile (313.19/km^{2}). There were 529 housing units at an average density of 364.58 per square mile (140.77/km^{2}). Of the 529 housing units, 5.5% were vacant. The homeowner vacancy rate was 1.3% and the rental vacancy rate was 9.2%.The racial makeup of the city was 96.43% White, 0.42% African American, 0.08% Native American, 0.00% Asian, 0.00% Pacific Islander, 0.51% from other races, and 2.55% from two or more races. Hispanic or Latino of any race were 1.44% of the population.

There were 439 households, out of which 31.2% had children under the age of 18 living with them, 60.82% were married couples living together, 8.88% had a female householder with no husband present, and 27.56% were non-families. 23.23% of all households were made up of individuals, and 7.97% had someone living alone who was 65 years of age or older. The average household size was 2.90 and the average family size was 2.49.

The city's age distribution consisted of 22.7% under the age of 18, 7.1% from 18 to 24, 23.4% from 25 to 44, 28.4% from 45 to 64, and 18.3% who were 65 years of age or older. The median age was 42.0 years. For every 100 females, there were 93.4 males. For every 100 females age 18 and over, there were 95.6 males.

The median income for a household in the city was $64,766, and the median income for a family was $78,214. Males had a median income of $50,375 versus $29,185 for females. The per capita income for the city was $30,734. About 2.2% of families and 3.5% of the population were below the poverty line, including 1.6% of those under age 18 and 6.0% of those age 65 or over.

Racial composition as of the 2020 census
Race	Number	Percent
White	1,135	96.4%
Black or African American	5	0.4%
American Indian and Alaska Native	1	0.1%
Asian	0	0.0%
Native Hawaiian and Other Pacific Islander	0	0.0%
Some other race	6	0.5%
Two or more races	30	2.5%
Hispanic or Latino (of any race)	17	1.4%

== Education ==
It is a part of the Meridian Community Unit School District 15.

The district's comprehensive high school is Meridian High School.

== Sports ==
=== High school ===
On June 4, 1971, the Macon High School baseball team finished in second place at the Illinois High School Association championship tournament. Their unlikely run to the state tournament was documented in Chris Ballard's 2012 book, One Shot at Forever: A Small Town, an Unlikely Coach, and a Magical Baseball Season.

Brian Snitker, a member of that team, joined the Atlanta Braves as a player in 1977, was their third base coach, and in 2013 was named the manager of Atlanta's Triple-A Gwinnett Braves. In 2016, the Atlanta Braves named Snitker as their manager.

On May 27, 2006, Meridian High School State Champion Rodney Oyler was the first individual IHSA Illinois Boys State Champion in the open 800 meter run at O'Brien Stadium, Charleston, Illinois.

The Meridian Hawks won the 2009 Boys Class 1A Illinois High School Association State Basketball Championship.

=== Auto racing ===
Macon is the site of Macon Speedway, a 1/5 mile high-banked dirt oval track which has been in operation since 1946.

In 2006, the track saw a major decrease in spectator turnouts and the owner was having trouble keeping the track open. In early 2007, Macon speedway was purchased by NASCAR drivers Tony Stewart, Ken Schrader, and Kenny Wallace. Since their purchase, parts of the track have been remodeled, including new fencing all around and fresh painted grandstands.

== Notable people ==
- Dale Connelly, co-host of Minnesota Public Radio's Morning Show, is a 1973 graduate of Macon High School
- Nelson G. Kraschel, governor of Iowa from 1937 to 1939, was born on a farm near Macon on October 27, 1889
- Brian Snitker, Manager of the Atlanta Braves baseball team, was a 1973 graduate of Macon High School.
- Toby Towson, NCAA Gymnastics Champion, was a 1965 graduate of Macon High School
- Art Wilson, (1885–1960), born in Macon, was a major league baseball catcher
