= Newman, Illinois =

Newman
- City
- Newman Illinois
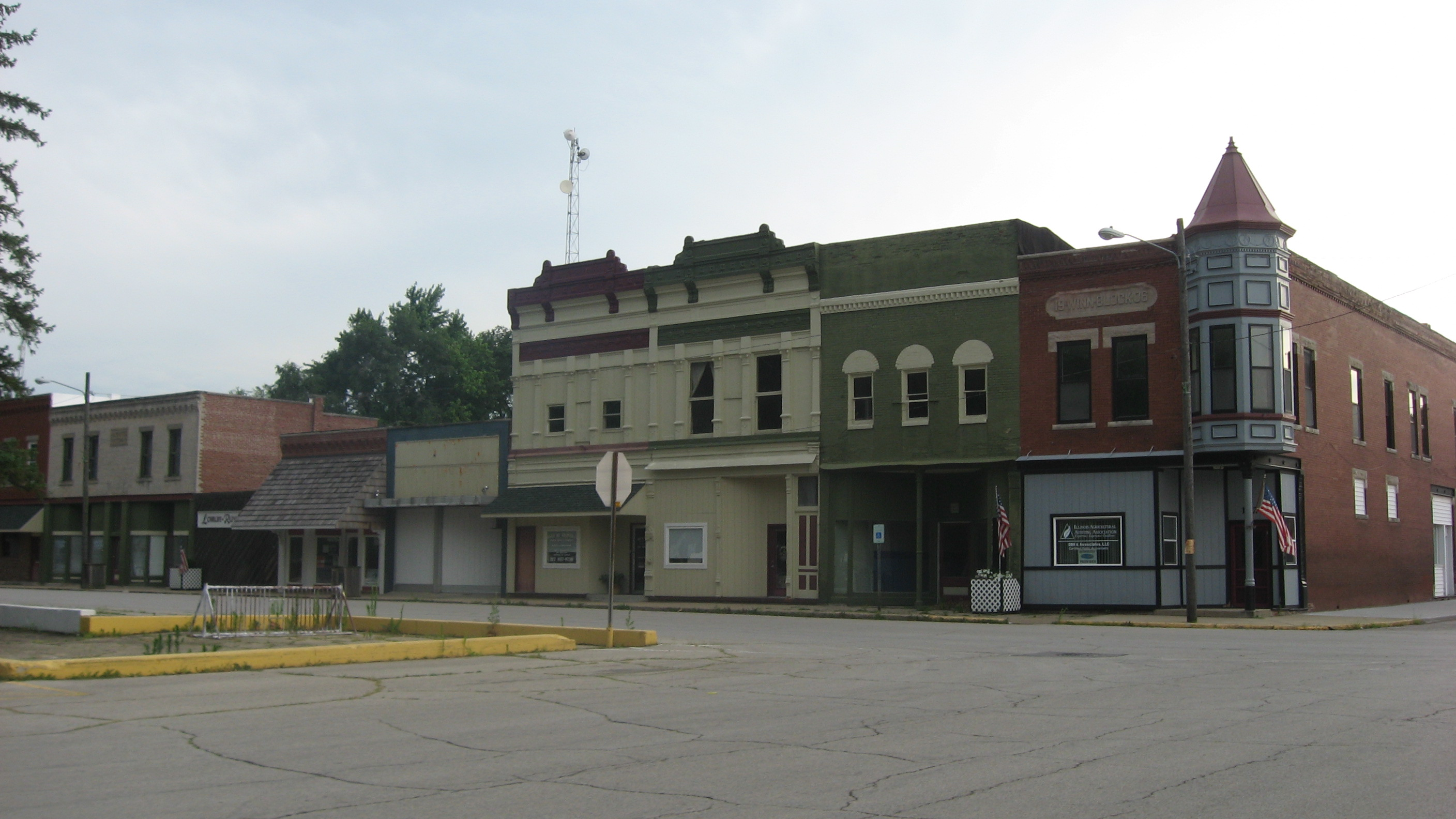
- Buildings on South Broadway, Downtown

- Location of Newman in Douglas County, Illinois.
- Coordinates: 39°47′38″N 87°59′46″W
- Country: United States
- State: Illinois
- County: Douglas
- Township: Newman

Area
  - Total: 0.61 sq mi (1.59 km^{2})
  - Land: 0.61 sq mi (1.59 km^{2})
  - Water: 0 sq mi (0.00 km^{2})
- Elevation: 646 ft (197 m)

Population (2020)
  - Total: 778
  - Density: 1,268.6/sq mi (489.82/km^{2})
- Time zone: UTC-6 (CST)
  - Summer (DST): UTC-5 (CDT)
- ZIP code: 61942
- Area code: 217
- FIPS code: 17-52623
- GNIS ID: 2395226
- Website: cityofnewmanil.com

Newman is a city in Douglas County, Illinois, United States. The population was 778 at the 2020 census.

== Geography ==
According to the 2010 census, Newman has a total area of 0.63 square miles (1.63 km^{2}), all land.

== Demographics ==
Historical population
Census	Pop.	Note	%±
1880	906		—
1890	990		9.3%
1900	1,166		17.8%
1910	1,264		8.4%
1920	1,225		−3.1%
1930	1,054		−14.0%
1940	1,103		4.6%
1950	1,140		3.4%
1960	1,097		−3.8%
1970	1,018		−7.2%
1980	1,079		6.0%
1990	960		−11.0%
2000	956		−0.4%
2010	865		−9.5%
2020	778		−10.1%
U.S. Decennial Census

As of the 2020 census there were 778 people, 364 households, and 240 families residing in the city. The population density was 1,269.17 inhabitants per square mile (490.03/km^{2}). There were 387 housing units at an average density of 631.32 per square mile (243.75/km^{2}). The racial makeup of the city was 93.44% White, 0.77% African American, 0.26% Native American, 0.51% Asian, 0.51% from other races, and 4.50% from two or more races. Hispanic or Latino of any race were 2.57% of the population.

There were 364 households, out of which 15.7% had children under the age of 18 living with them, 60.99% were married couples living together, 3.02% had a female householder with no husband present, and 34.07% were non-families. 27.75% of all households were made up of individuals, and 11.81% had someone living alone who was 65 years of age or older. The average household size was 2.42 and the average family size was 2.01.

The city's age distribution consisted of 13.9% under the age of 18, 2.4% from 18 to 24, 16.3% from 25 to 44, 22.7% from 45 to 64, and 44.8% who were 65 years of age or older. The median age was 61.2 years. For every 100 females, there were 85.4 males. For every 100 females age 18 and over, there were 81.3 males.

The median income for a household in the city was $58,125, and the median income for a family was $63,956. Males had a median income of $36,250 versus $28,393 for females. The per capita income for the city was $27,455. About 5.4% of families and 11.4% of the population were below the poverty line, including 21.8% of those under age 18 and 3.1% of those age 65 or over.

== Transportation ==
Dial-A-Ride Public Transportation provides dial-a-ride bus transit service to the city. The nearest passenger rail service is at either Mattoon station or Champaign station, where Amtrak operates to Chicago, Carbondale, New Orleans, and other destinations.

== Notable residents ==
- James Gammon - movie and television actor
- Ben Roller - physician, professional wrestler and football player
