= Broadlands, Illinois =

Broadlands
- Village
- Location of Broadlands in Champaign County, Illinois.
- Coordinates: 39°54′32″N 87°59′57″W
- Country: United States
- State: Illinois
- County: Champaign
- Township: Ayers

Government
  - Village Mayor: Bruce Block

Area
  - Total: 0.32 sq mi (0.84 km^{2})
  - Land: 0.32 sq mi (0.84 km^{2})
  - Water: 0 sq mi (0.00 km^{2})
- Elevation: 682 ft (208 m)

Population (2020)
  - Total: 316
  - Density: 979.9/sq mi (378.36/km^{2})
- Time zone: UTC-6 (CST)
  - Summer (DST): UTC-5 (CDT)
- Postal code: 61816
- Area code: 217
- FIPS code: 17-08420
- GNIS feature ID: 2397459

Broadlands is a village in Champaign County, Illinois, along the East Branch of the Embarras River. The population was 316 at the 2020 census. Originally owned by the Sullivant family, Broadlands was, at over 70,000 acres (280 km^{2}), one of the world's largest farms in the late 1860s. Broadlands was sold to John T. Alexander in 1866, and it was broken up upon his death in 1876 to pay his creditors.

== Geography ==
According to the 2021 census gazetteer files, Broadlands has a total area of 0.32 square miles (0.83 km^{2}), all land.

== Demographics ==
Historical population
Census	Pop.	Note	%±
1910	480		—
1920	384		−20.0%
1930	377		−1.8%
1940	361		−4.2%
1950	333		−7.8%
1960	344		3.3%
1970	315		−8.4%
1980	346		9.8%
1990	340		−1.7%
2000	312		−8.2%
2010	349		11.9%
2020	316		−9.5%
U.S. Decennial Census

As of the 2020 census there were 316 people, 122 households, and 88 families residing in the village. The population density was 981.37 inhabitants per square mile (378.91/km^{2}). There were 144 housing units at an average density of 447.20 per square mile (172.66/km^{2}). The racial makeup of the village was 93.67% White, 0.95% African American, 0.95% from other races, and 4.43% from two or more races. Hispanic or Latino of any race were 2.53% of the population.

There were 122 households, out of which 28.7% had children under the age of 18 living with them, 67.21% were married couples living together, 3.28% had a female householder with no husband present, and 27.87% were non-families. 19.67% of all households were made up of individuals, and 11.48% had someone living alone who was 65 years of age or older. The average household size was 3.32 and the average family size was 2.79.

The village's age distribution consisted of 22.9% under the age of 18, 9.7% from 18 to 24, 22.3% from 25 to 44, 27.9% from 45 to 64, and 17.1% who were 65 years of age or older. The median age was 40.0 years. For every 100 females, there were 94.3 males. For every 100 females age 18 and over, there were 89.9 males.

The median income for a household in the village was $53,500, and the median income for a family was $76,875. Males had a median income of $45,417 versus $21,500 for females. The per capita income for the village was $22,762. About 20.5% of families and 20.9% of the population were below the poverty line, including 11.5% of those under age 18 and 25.9% of those age 65 or over.

== Community ==
Water is piped from the Mahomet Aquifer, as compared to the treated well water provided by most other nearby villages.

Elementary and junior high students from Broadlands attend school in Homer, while students in all of Heritage Community School District #8 (Homer, Allerton, Broadlands, Longview) attend the expanded high school in Broadlands.

The Broadlands Community Club holds a homecoming festival each year. The Club typically has events throughout the day for children and adults including a parade, afternoon entertainment, a fish fry and homemade pies.

== Education ==
It is in the Heritage Community Unit School District 8.
