= Arcola Community Unit School District 306 =

School district in Douglas County, Illinois, United States

Arcola CUSD #306

Address
- 351 West Washington Street Arcola, Illinois, 61910; United States

District information
- Type: Public School
- Motto: "Riding Innovation Into The Future"
- Grades: PreK-12
- Superintendent: Tom Mulligan

Students and staff
- District mascot: Purple Rider
- Colors: Purple and White

Other information
- Website: Official website

Arcola Community Unit School District 306 is a unified school district based in a southern Douglas County settlement named Arcola, Illinois. The district is composed of an elementary school and a consolidated junior senior high school. The junior senior high school, although consolidated, is still regarded as two different schools. Students enter the district as prekindergarteners or kindergarteners in Arcola Elementary School, which educates the students until sixth grade under the supervision of principal Angie Gentry. Graduates of the elementary school move on to Arcola Junior High School, and will remain there until seventh grade; afterwards, students complete their precollegiate education at Arcola High School. Principal Lisa Sigrist directs both schools; The mascot of both schools, is the Purple Rider. The district superintendent is Tom Mulligan; he broadcasts monthly podcasts to his district.

== 1:1 Digital Learning ==
The initiative of 1:1 digital learning at Arcola Schools, is not on the technology. The goal is to transform the learning in all classrooms in Arcola. Since the implementation the school district has seen many positive outcomes, such as improved student engagement, preparation of students for digital literacy, shift in learning activities to be more relevant to the real world, and many more.

Technology Used

Elementary School

Students in grades K-6 are given an iPad (6th Generation) to be used in the classrooms, and only grades 4 and above are allowed to take them home.

High School

Students in grades 7-12 are given an iPad Pro 10.5, along with an Apple Pencil and a Logitech Slim Combo Keyboard/Case. All students in high school are allowed to take home their iPads.

== Athletics ==
Arcola High School offers the current sports with the IHSA

Boys

- Baseball
- Basketball
- Football
- Golf
- Track & Field

Girls

- Basketball
- Competitive Cheerleading
- Softball
- Track & Field
- Volleyball

== Extracurricular Activities ==
Outside of athletics, Arcola High School offers

- Band
- Pep Band
- Marching Band
- Choir
- Drama Club
- Scholastic Bowl
- National Art Honor Society (NAHS)
- Student Council
- FFA
- AFS
- FCCLA
- Cheerleading
