= South Homer Township, Champaign County, Illinois =

South Homer Township
- Township
- Location in Champaign County

- Champaign County's location in Illinois
- Coordinates: 40°01′24″N 87°58′19″W
- Country: United States
- State: Illinois
- County: Champaign
- Settled: November 8, 1859

Area
  - Total: 28.26 sq mi (73.2 km^{2})
  - Land: 27.96 sq mi (72.4 km^{2})
  - Water: 0.3 sq mi (0.78 km^{2}) 1.06%
- Elevation: 669 ft (204 m)

Population (2020)
  - Total: 1,492
  - Density: 53.36/sq mi (20.60/km^{2})
- Time zone: UTC-6 (CST)
  - Summer (DST): UTC-5 (CDT)
- FIPS code: 17-019-70863

South Homer Township is a township in Champaign County, Illinois, USA. As of the 2020 census, its population was 1,492 and it contained 696 housing units.

== Geography ==
South Homer is composed of parts of Townships 18 and 19 North, Range 11 East of the Third Principal Meridian; and Townships 18 and 19 North, Range 14 West of the Second Principal Meridian. When the federal township land surveys were done in 1821 one group of surveyors went west from the Second Principal Meridian and another went east from the Third Principal Meridian. Both groups used rawhide measuring lines that expanded and contracted with the weather. When the two groups met in eastern Champaign County the surveys didn't agree, resulting in double section numbers in the eastern townships and ongoing property line confusion among landowners.

According to the 2010 census, the township has a total area of 28.26 square miles (73.2 km^{2}), of which 27.96 square miles (72.4 km^{2}) (or 98.94%) is land and 0.3 square miles (0.78 km^{2}) (or 1.06%) is water. The Salt Fork of the Vermilion River winds its way through the north west section of the township. The confluence of 40°N 88°W lies in a farm field, in section 19 of the township.

=== Cities and towns ===
- Homer

=== Unincorporated towns ===
(This list is based on USGS data and may include former settlements.)

=== Cemeteries ===
The township contains three cemeteries: Homer Grand Army of the Republic (Section 9, T18N, R14W, Village of Homer), Lost Grove (Section 30, T18N, R11E) and Old Homer—Dunkard Cemetery (Section 32, T19N, R14W).

=== Grain elevators ===
Homer elevators (Sections 8 and 9, T18N, R14W) were built along the Wabash—Norfolk Southern railroad. J.C. Koehn operated an elevator in 1929.

=== Mills ===
In 1834 Moses Thomas, a native of Pennsylvania, built a water-powered grist and sawmill on the Salt Fork creek about a mile north of the present village of Homer (Section 33, T19N, R14W) and began to mill grain. The millpond and dam formed the central attraction of the Homer Park amusement area 1905–1931. The site is now part of the Homer Lake Forest Preserve.

=== Homer Park ===
Homer Park was a rural amusement area on the Salt Fork river established in 1905 on the Illinois Traction System electric interurban north−south line between Ogden and Homer. Built at the site of the Moses Thomas mill of the 1830s it was intended to provide a recreational destination for riders of the trolley cars. The interurban bridge, a high trestle structure, ran straight across a lake created from the old millpond. A wooden walkway at lake level was located beside the bridge. The rebuilt mill dam was downstream from the trolley bridge. The local road curved around the upstream end of the lake and crossed the river on a covered bridge built in the mid−1800s. Park buildings and rental boats lined the lake shore.

Outdoor activities for visitors included boating, swimming, dancing, roller skating and other amusements. An open−air movie theater showed silent films, and local and touring musical groups such as Bohumir Kryl′s well−known concert band gave performances in the bandstand. There was a zoo for children and refreshments for their parents.

The park gradually declined in the late 1920s until it closed in 1931. On 6 April 1934 the covered bridge collapsed overnight. The interurban line was discontinued, and the trolley bridge was replaced by a highway bridge, now Illinois Route 49. In 1998 Bill and Marion Edwards of Homer donated 28 acres of the old park site to the Homer Lake Forest Preserve. The stone abutments of the covered bridge and a stone fountain remain for visitors to seek out.

=== Major highways ===
- Illinois State Route 49

=== Airports and landing strips ===
- Homer Airport (historical)

== Demographics ==
As of the 2020 census there were 1,492 people, 684 households, and 481 families residing in the township. The population density was 52.78 inhabitants per square mile (20.38/km^{2}). There were 696 housing units at an average density of 24.62 per square mile (9.51/km^{2}). The racial makeup of the township was 93.23% White, 0.27% African American, 0.00% Native American, 0.60% Asian, 0.00% Pacific Islander, 0.47% from other races, and 5.43% from two or more races. Hispanic or Latino of any race were 2.08% of the population.

There were 684 households, out of which 27.50% had children under the age of 18 living with them, 51.32% were married couples living together, 13.89% had a female householder with no spouse present, and 29.68% were non-families. 26.50% of all households were made up of individuals, and 8.80% had someone living alone who was 65 years of age or older. The average household size was 2.38 and the average family size was 2.86.

The township's age distribution consisted of 23.7% under the age of 18, 9.9% from 18 to 24, 25.8% from 25 to 44, 21.6% from 45 to 64, and 19.0% who were 65 years of age or older. The median age was 38.3 years. For every 100 females, there were 106.5 males. For every 100 females age 18 and over, there were 94.7 males.

The median income for a household in the township was $80,929, and the median income for a family was $88,702. Males had a median income of $58,929 versus $28,306 for females. The per capita income for the township was $46,991. About 8.7% of families and 8.6% of the population were below the poverty line, including 15.7% of those under age 18 and 4.5% of those age 65 or over.

Historical population
Census	Pop.	Note	%±
2010	1,601		—
2020	1,492		−6.8%
U.S. Decennial Census
