= Heart of Illinois Conference (1970s) =

The Heart of Illinois Conference was Central Illinois based high school athletic conference in the Illinois High School Association (IHSA) between 1972 and 1978.

Locations of Heart of Illinois Conference (1970's)

== History ==
The conference was formed in 1972 out of members of the Corn Belt Conference along with Canton, Illinois Valley Central, Metamora, Morton, Washington, and (newly established) Stanford Olympia high schools. In the 1972 and 1973 football seasons the conference was divided into east and west divisions. The east division was composed of Bloomington Central Catholic, Clinton, Normal U-High, Pontiac, and Stanford Olympia. The west division included Canton, Chillicothe IVC, Metamora, Morton, and Washington. The divisions were discontinued after IHSA state football playoffs started in 1974.

The conference split apart after the 1977-78 school year, with many members reincorporating the Corn Belt Conference.

== Member schools ==
School	Community	Team name	Colors	IHSA class	School type	Year joined	Joined from	Year departed	Departed for	References
Central Catholic High School	Bloomington	Saints		1A/2A/3A	Private	1972	Corn Belt	1978	Corn Belt	
Clinton High School	Clinton	Maroons			Public	1972	Corn Belt	1978	Corn Belt	
Pontiac Township High School	Pontiac	Indians		4A	Public	1972	Corn Belt	1978	Corn Belt	
University High School	Normal	Pioneers		5A	Public lab school	1972	Corn Belt	1978	Corn Belt	
Washington Community High School	Washington	Panthers			Public	1972	Corn Belt	1978	Mid-State 10	
Canton High School	Canton	Little Giants			Public	1972	Illini	1978	Heartland	
Illinois Valley Central High School	Chillicothe	Grey Ghosts		4A	Public	1972	Illio	1978	Heartland	
Metamora Township High School	Metamora	Cardinals			Public	1972	Illio	1978	Corn Belt	
Morton High School	Morton	Potters			Public	1972	Illini	1978	Heartland	
Olympia High School	Stanford	Spartans		3A	Public	1972	none (new school)	1978	Corn Belt	
Eureka High School	Eureka	Hornets		4A	Public	1972		1978	Corn Belt	
