= Corn Belt Conference =

The Corn Belt Conference was a high school athletic conference in the Illinois High School Association (IHSA), based in Central Illinois. The conference consisted of medium-sized and small high schools.

== History ==
The Corn Belt Conference was originally formed in 1950 by Clinton, Normal Community, Pontiac Township, Trinity (later Central Catholic), and University High Schools. The conference was incorporated into the former Heart of Illinois Conference in 1972 but was reformed in 1978.

Eureka High School left the Corn Belt Conference for the Heart of Illinois Conference after the 2015–2016 school year. U-High and Mahomet-Seymour departed for the Central State Eight Conference and Apollo Conference respectively in the 2017–18 school year. In April 2016, school boards of the remaining five schools and the school boards of the five schools in the Okaw Valley Conference voted unanimously to merge into a new Illini Prairie Conference beginning in the 2017–18 school year.

== Member schools ==
=== 1950–1972 ===
School	Community	Team name	Colors	IHSA class	School type	Year joined	Joined from	Year departed	Departed for	References
Central Catholic (Trinity) High School	Bloomington	Saints		1A/2A/3A	Private	1950		1972	Heart of Illinois (1970s)	
Clinton High School	Clinton	Maroons			Public	1950		1972	Heart of Illinois (1970s)	
Normal Community High School	Normal	Ironmen		AA, 2A, 3A	Public	1950		1971	Capitol	
Pontiac Township High School	Pontiac	Indians		4A	Public	1950		1972	Heart of Illinois (1970s)	
University High School	Normal	Pioneers		5A	Public lab school	1950		1972	Heart of Illinois (1970s)	
Washington Community High School	Washington	Panthers			Public	1957	Illini	1972	Heart of Illinois (1970s)	
St. Teresa High School	Decatur	Bulldogs			Private	1967		1969		

=== 1978–2017 ===
School	Community	Team name	Colors	IHSA class	School type	Year joined	Joined from	Year departed	Departed for	References
Central Catholic High School	Bloomington	Saints		1A/2A/3A	Private	1978	Heart of Illinois (1970s)	2017	Illini Prairie	
Clinton High School	Clinton	Maroons			Public	1978	Heart of Illinois (1970s)	1990	Okaw Valley	
Pontiac Township High School	Pontiac	Indians		4A	Public	1978	Heart of Illinois (1970s)	2017	Illini Prairie	
University High School	Normal	Pioneers		5A	Public lab school	1978	Heart of Illinois (1970s)	2017	Central State Eight	
Metamora Township High School	Metamora	Redbirds			Public	1978	Heart of Illinois (1970s)	1982	Mid-Illini	
Olympia High School	Stanford	Spartans		3A	Public	1978	Heart of Illinois (1970s)	2017	Illini Prairie	
Eureka High School	Eureka	Hornets		4A	Public	1978; 2004	Heart of Illinois (1970s); Tri-County	1982; 2016	Blackhawk; Heart of Illinois	
St. Bede Academy	Peru	Bruins		2A	Private	1982		1996	Private School	
Mahomet-Seymour High School	Mahomet	Bulldogs		4A	Public	1986	Okaw Valley	2017	Apollo	
Prairie Central High School	Fairbury	Hawks		4A	Public	1990	Wauseca	2017	Illini Prairie	
Herscher High School	Herscher	Tigers			Public	2002	Suburban Prairie	2006	Interstate 8	
Rochester High School	Rochester	Rockets		A, AA, 2A, 3A	Public	2002	Sangamo	2010	Central State Eight	
Rantoul Township High School	Rantoul	Eagles		4A	Public	2004	Big Twelve	2015	Okaw Valley	
Illinois Valley Central High School	Chillicothe	Grey Ghosts		4A	Public	2014	Mid-State 6, North Central Illinois	2017	Illini Prairie	
