= Ron Taylor (American football) =

American football player and coach

Biographical details
- Born: c. 1940; Illinois, U.S.
- Died: March 6, 2014 (aged 73–74); Phoenix, Arizona, U.S.

Playing career
- 1959–1961: Missouri
- Position: Quarterback

Coaching career (HC unless noted)
- 1964–1966: Joplin HS (MO)
- 1975–1978: Northeast Missouri State
- 1982: Colorado (RB)
- 1983: Colorado (OC)
- 1988–1990: Scotland County HS (MO)
- 1991–1992: Quincy (OC)
- 1993–1996: Quincy

Head coaching record
- Overall: 48–29–2 (college)

Accomplishments and honors

Championships
- 1 MIAA (1976); 2 IBFC (1993–1994)

Ron Taylor (c. 1940 – March 6, 2014) was an American football coach and player. He served as the head football coach at Northeast Missouri State College—now known as Truman State University—from 1975 to 1978 and Quincy University in Quincy, Illinois from 1993 to 1996. Taylor played college football as a quarterback at the University of Missouri from 1959 to 1961.

== Career ==
As the starting quarterback at the University of Missouri, he led the Tigers to back-to-back Orange Bowl appearances during 1959 and 1960 seasons.

Raised in Chillicothe, Illinois, Taylor played quarterback for the Chillicothe Township Grey Ghosts. His father, George, coached both Ron and his younger brother Tim (better known as actor Josh Taylor of Days of Our Lives and The Hogan Family fame.) in high school. He completed a B.S. degree in education at the University of Missouri in 1962.

Taylor began his coaching career as the head coach of Joplin High School in Joplin, Missouri from 1964 to 1966, where he led the Eagles to a 17–12–2 record.

In 1975, Taylor became the head football coach at Truman State University where he led the Bulldogs to a 26–14–2 record over four seasons. During his time at Truman, he coached future NFL head coach Gregg Williams.

From 1988 to 1990, Taylor served as the head coach at Scotland County R-I High School in Memphis, Missouri.

Taylor served as the head coach at Quincy University in Quincy, Illinois from 1993 to 1996 after serving as the team's offensive coordinator from 1991 to 1992. He compiled a record of 22–15 as the head coach of the Hawks. He led the program to two Illini-Badger Football Conference titles in 1993 and 1994.

== Death ==
Taylor died on March 6, 2014, after suffering from lung cancer.

== Head coaching record ==
Year	Team	Overall	Conference	Standing	Bowl/playoffs
Northeast Missouri State Bulldogs (Missouri Intercollegiate Athletic Association) (1975–1978)
1975	Northeast Missouri State	7–4	4–2	2nd	
1976	Northeast Missouri State	5–3–1	4–1–1	T–1st	
1977	Northeast Missouri State	8–3	4–2	3rd	
1978	Northeast Missouri State	6–4–1	5–1	2nd	
Truman State:		26–14–2	17–6–1		
Quincy Hawks (Illini–Badger Football Conference) (1993–1996)
1993	Quincy	9–0	6–0	1st	
1994	Quincy	8–1	6–0	1st	
1995	Quincy	4–6			
1996	Quincy	1–8			
Quincy:		22–15			
Total:		48–29–2			
