= Massacre Mansion =

Massacre Mansion may refer to:

- Mansion of the Doomed, 1976 horror film directed by Michael Pataki
- The Nesting, 1981 horror film directed by Armand Weston
- The haunted house at the annual Spider Hill Halloween event, Chillicothe, Illinois - see Spider Hill#Massacre Mansion

== See also ==
- Maniac Mansion, 1987 graphic adventure from LucasArts
