= Illini Prairie Conference =

Illinois high school athletic conference

- Conference: IHSA
- No. of teams: 10 (one non-football)
- Region: Central Illinois

The Illini Prairie Conference is a high school athletic conference in the Illinois High School Association (IHSA), based in Central Illinois. The conference comprises ten medium-sized and small high schools resulting from the merging of the Corn Belt Conference and the Okaw Valley Conference. Conference athletics began in the 2017-18 school year.

== History ==
Member schools of the Corn Belt Conference and the Okaw Valley Conference began discussing a merger after the announced departures of Eureka High School and Mahomet-Seymour High School from the Corn Belt Conference in 2014 and 2015. Principals of the ten schools voted unanimously in February 2016 to begin plans to merge the conferences. School boards of the ten schools approved the new conference in March and April 2016. Student bodies of each school submitted favorite names for the conference to the principals. Illini Prairie was selected unanimously by the principals.

Paxton-Buckley-Loda joined the conference at the start of the 2020-21 school year after, making the move after St. Thomas More decided to play an eight-man football schedule. PBL had played in the Sangamon Valley Conference since 1990. St. Thomas More remains a member of the Illini Prairie Conference in all other sports.

Olympia in 2021, left the Illini Prairie Conference to join the Sangamo Conference, Thus leaving the Illini Prairie Conference with ten teams in the Conference and 9 of them that play football, still leaving St. Thomas More an 8-man football team.

== Member schools ==
Illini Prairie Conference Members (clickable map)

School	Location	Mascot	Colors	School type	2021-22 Enrollment	IHSA class	Year joined	Joined from	References
Central Catholic High School	Bloomington, Illinois	Saints		Private	321 / 530.48 (multiplied)	1A/2A/3A	2017	Corn Belt	
Illinois Valley Central High School	Chillicothe, Illinois	Grey Ghosts		Public	610	4A	2017	Corn Belt	
Monticello High School	Monticello, Illinois	Sages		Public	519	3A	2017	Okaw Valley	
Paxton-Buckley-Loda High School	Paxton, Illinois	Panthers		Public	463	3A	2020	Sangamon Valley	
Pontiac Township High School	Pontiac, Illinois	Indians		Public	656	4A	2017	Corn Belt	
Prairie Central High School	Fairbury, Illinois	Hawks		Public	528	3A	2017	Corn Belt	
Rantoul Township High School	Rantoul, Illinois	Eagles		Public	772	4A	2017	Okaw Valley	
St. Joseph-Ogden High School	St. Joseph, Illinois	Spartans		Public	449	3A	2017	Okaw Valley	
St. Thomas More High School	Champaign, Illinois	Sabers		Private	257 / 424.88 (multiplied)	2A	2017	Okaw Valley	
Unity High School	Tolono, Illinois	Rockets		Public	517	3A	2017	Okaw Valley	

=== Previous Members ===
School	Location	Mascot	Colors	School type	Year joined	Year left	Joined from	Current conference
Olympia High School	Stanford, Illinois	Spartans		Public	2017	2021	Corn Belt	Sangamo

== See also ==
- List of Illinois High School Association member conferences
