= St. Thomas More High School (Champaign, Illinois) =

The High School of Saint Thomas More

Location
- 3901 North Mattis Avenue; Champaign, Illinois 61822; United States
- 40°9′43″N 88°16′42″W

Information
- Type: Private
- Motto: "Students Today. Community Leaders Tomorrow. Christ's Disciples Forever."
- Denomination: Roman Catholic
- Patron saint: St. Thomas More
- Established: 2000
- Oversight: Diocese of Peoria
- Principal: Sr. M. Bridget Martin, FSGM
- Chaplain: Fr.Jack Swoik
- Teaching staff: 24
- Grades: 9-12
- Gender: coed
- Enrollment: 213 (2021-22)
- Average class size: 15
- Student to teacher ratio: 11:1
- Campus type: Rural
- Colors: Green and gold
- Slogan: ROLL SABERS
- Athletics conference: Illini Prairie Conference
- Mascot: Sammy the Saber
- Team name: Sabers
- Accreditation: North Central Association of Colleges and Schools
- Tuition: $8,155 for Catholics $12,205 for Non-Catholics $16,405 for International Students
- Website: www.hs-stm.org

The High School of Saint Thomas More (STM) is the only private, Roman Catholic comprehensive, co-educational high school in Champaign, Illinois. It is located in the far northwest part of Champaign. The school has an enrollment of 213 for the 2021–22 academic term. STM reports that 99% of all of their graduates have attended a post-secondary college or university. There are 1243 alumni as of August 2021. The school is headed by Principal Sr. M. Bridget Martin, and Chaplain Fr.Jack Swoik

== History ==
The High School of Saint Thomas More is the seventh and newest high school of the Catholic Diocese of Peoria. It was dedicated in the summer of 2000 by Francis Cardinal George, OMI, Archbishop of Chicago, and Bishop John J. Myers of Peoria. In 2003, the first class graduated from STM.

== Student body ==
STM reports that approximately 38% of their population receives institutional financial assistance to help cover their cost of attendance. Furthermore, despite the school's religious affiliation, STM admits students regardless of their own religion. For the 18–19 school year, 20% of students identified as non-Catholic and 22% identified as an ethnic minority.

== Sports ==
STM's nickname is the Sabers and their school colors are Green and Gold. STM offers the following sports: Baseball, Soccer, Football, Tennis, Softball, Track, Basketball, Swimming, Diving, Wrestling, Volleyball, Golf, Cheerleading, and Cross Country.

Since opening in 2000, STM has won six IHSA state championships and a couple runner ups:

- Girls Basketball, 2014
- Boys Cross Country, 2012
- Girls Golf, 2010
- Boys Golf, 2008
- Girls Volleyball, 2017, 2022
- Boys Wrestling (Brody Cuppernell), 2x IHSA 1A Runner up at 190 LBS, 2022, 2023
