= Central Catholic High School (Bloomington, Illinois) =

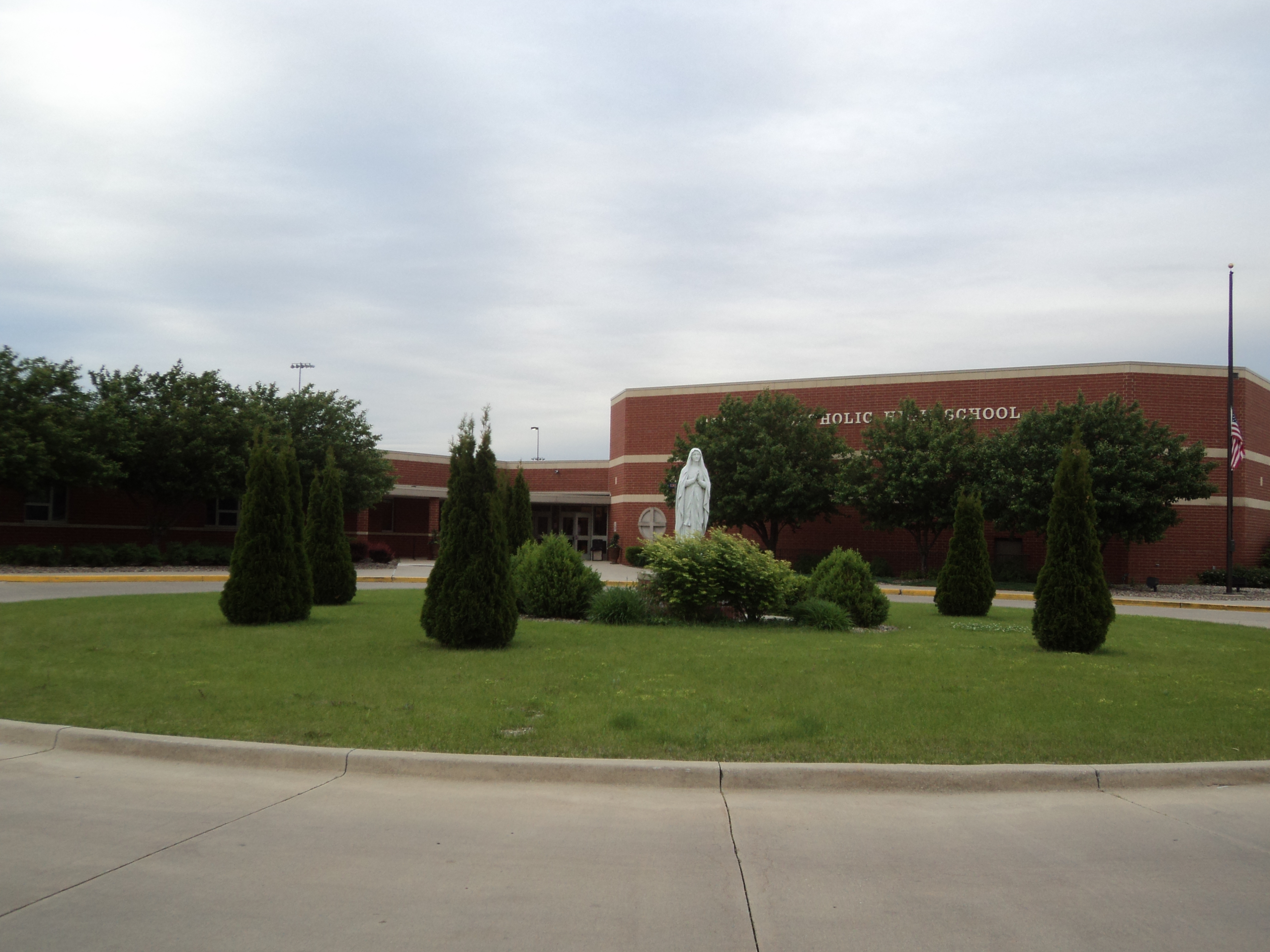
- CCHS roundabout entrance

Location
- 1201 Airport Road; Bloomington, Illinois 61704-2534; United States; 40°29′35″N 88°55′22″W

Information
- Former names: Trinity High School; St. Mary's High School
- School type: Parochial high school
- Motto: Our difference is our strength.
- Religious affiliation: Roman Catholic
- Patron saint: Elizabeth Ann Seton
- Established: 1886; 140 years ago
- Founder: Michael Weldon
- Status: Operational
- Locale: Small city
- School board: Advisory Committee
- Oversight: Pastors' Board
- Authorizer: Diocese of Peoria
- Superintendent: Sharon Weiss
- CEEB code: 140340
- NCES School ID: 00346865
- President: Sean Foster
- Principal: Chris McGraw
- Chaplain: Fr. Geoff Horton
- Staff: 6 (FTE)
- Faculty: 29 (FTE)
- Grades: 9–12
- Gender: coed
- Enrollment: 329 (2017-18)
- Average class size: 19
- Student to teacher ratio: 12:1
- Schedule type: Semester, daily
- Schedule: M–F except holidays
- Hours in school day: 6.7
- Campus size: 15 acres
- Area: 100,000 square feet
- Campus type: Micro-urban
- Colors: Navy blue White; Vegas gold
- Fight song: Victory March variant
- Athletics: IHSA 1A/2A/3A
- Athletics conference: Illini Prairie
- Sports: 9 boys', 8 girls' (Note: Does not include cheerleading)
- Team name: Saints
- Rival: U-High (Note: The schools are currently in different conferences and do not play each other.)
- Accreditation: AdvancED
- National ranking: WP: 1,339 (2017)
- Newspaper: Herald of the Saints
- Yearbook: Centrix
- Endowment: $3,842,936 (2014)
- Budget: $3,603,811.23 (2013–14)
- School fees: Varies
- Tuition: $7,445 parish affiliated $9,300 nonaffiliated
- Revenue: $3,474,273 (2015–16)
- Communities served: McLean County
- Feeder schools: CCCS, ECS, SMS
- Graduates (2017): 78
- Affiliation: NCEA, NASSP, IHSA
- Website: blmcchs.org
- Last updated: 28 September 2017

Central Catholic High School (CCHS or Central Catholic) is a private co-educational Catholic high school in Bloomington, Illinois, United States. It serves approximately 320 students in the Bloomington-Normal area. CCHS is one of seven Catholic high schools in the Roman Catholic Diocese of Peoria and the only Catholic high school in McLean County.

Begun in 1886 as St. Mary's High School by Holy Trinity Parish as an extension of the parish grade school, it was renamed Trinity High School in 1928 after construction of a separate high school building. In 1967, the school was renamed again to Central Catholic High School to reflect new roles of other regional parishes in oversight of the school. In 2003 CCHS moved from its location near downtown Bloomington to its current east side location on Airport Road. The school building is more than 100,000 square feet on a fifteen-acre property and has capacity for 500 students.

CCHS offers Advanced Placement and dual credit courses. Vocational education is available through a partnership with the Bloomington Area Career Center. A large majority of Central Catholic graduates pursue further education. In addition to coursework, Central Catholic requires community service as part of its graduation requirements.

Extracurricular activities at the school include sports teams, student clubs and organizations. CCHS participates in Illinois High School Association athletics and is a member of Illini Prairie Conference. Teams at CCHS have won state championships in boys' and girls' basketball, football, girls' track and field, and volleyball.

== History ==
=== St. Mary's High School ===
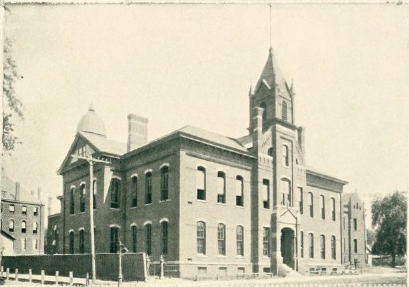
Circa 1896 photograph of the St. Mary's School building

CCHS has roots in St. Mary's School, built at a cost of $26,000 (Note: equivalent to $932,000 in 2025) by Holy Trinity Parish in 1884 during the pastorate of Michael Weldon. The building was located at the northeast corner of the intersection of Locust and Center Streets in Bloomington, Illinois. Initially only a grade school, the building was altered in 1886 to add high school classes. Two graduates in 1898 composed the high school's first graduating class. The parish paid off the debt for the school building in 1909. In 1912 Illinois State University and the University of Illinois recognized St. Mary's high school curriculum. The graduating class that spring had twenty students.

Sinsinawa Dominican sisters served as faculty at St. Mary's and subsequently at Trinity High School, teaching nearly all classes until the 1950s. Catholic priests, however, taught boys' religious educations for three years of high school.

=== Trinity High School ===
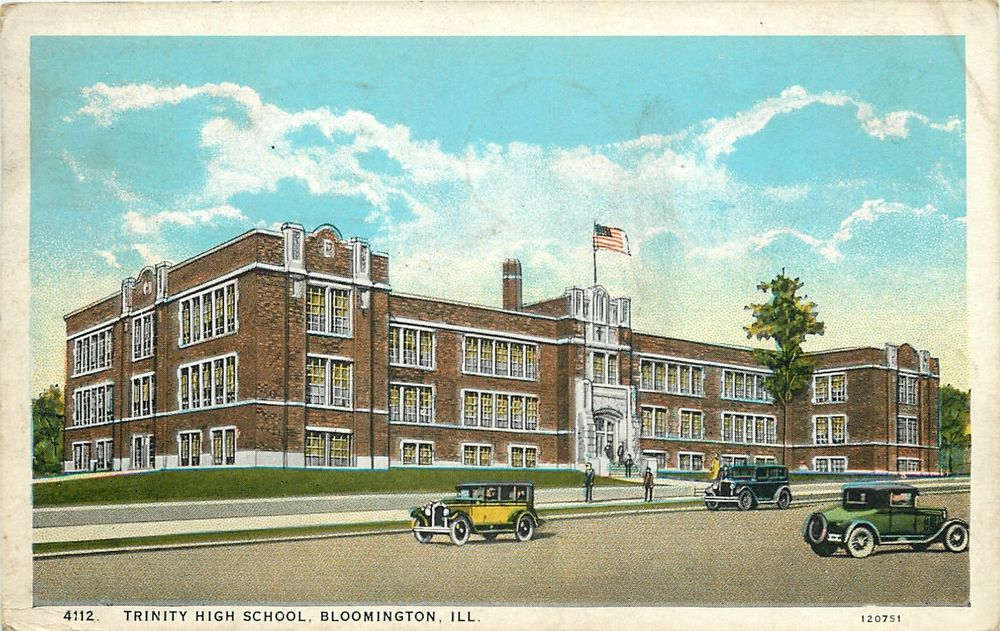
Circa 1933 postcard illustrating Trinity High School

By 1920, inspectors from the University of Illinois and the Illinois Department of Education were dissatisfied with the high school facilities at St. Mary's School. With the student body growing, land for a separate high school building next to Holy Trinity Church at 712 North Center Street was purchased from the Dominican sisters in summer 1922 for $25,000. (Note: equivalent to $481,000 in 2025) However, due to the poor health of pastor Michael Weldon, construction was postponed until after his death The cornerstone of the school building was laid on 25 September 1927. Costing $285,000, (Note: equivalent to $5,282,000 in 2025) the building was completed on 3 September 1928 and opened one week later as Trinity High School. Fifty-nine seniors graduated the following June. The St. Mary's School building was renovated in summer 1928 and continued to serve as Holy Trinity Grade School before demolition in 1969.

In 1929, Trinity High School gained accreditation from the North Central Association. The school joined the IHSA in 1941 when private schools were first allowed to participate. A $300,000 (Note: equivalent to $3,600,000 in 2025) funding drive in 1954 financed the additions of a cafeteria and south annex to the school. The annex initially housed 7th and 8th grade classrooms to alleviate overcrowding at Holy Trinity Grade School. After construction of new grade schools in 1963, annex classrooms were used for math and physical education classes.

=== Central Catholic High School ===
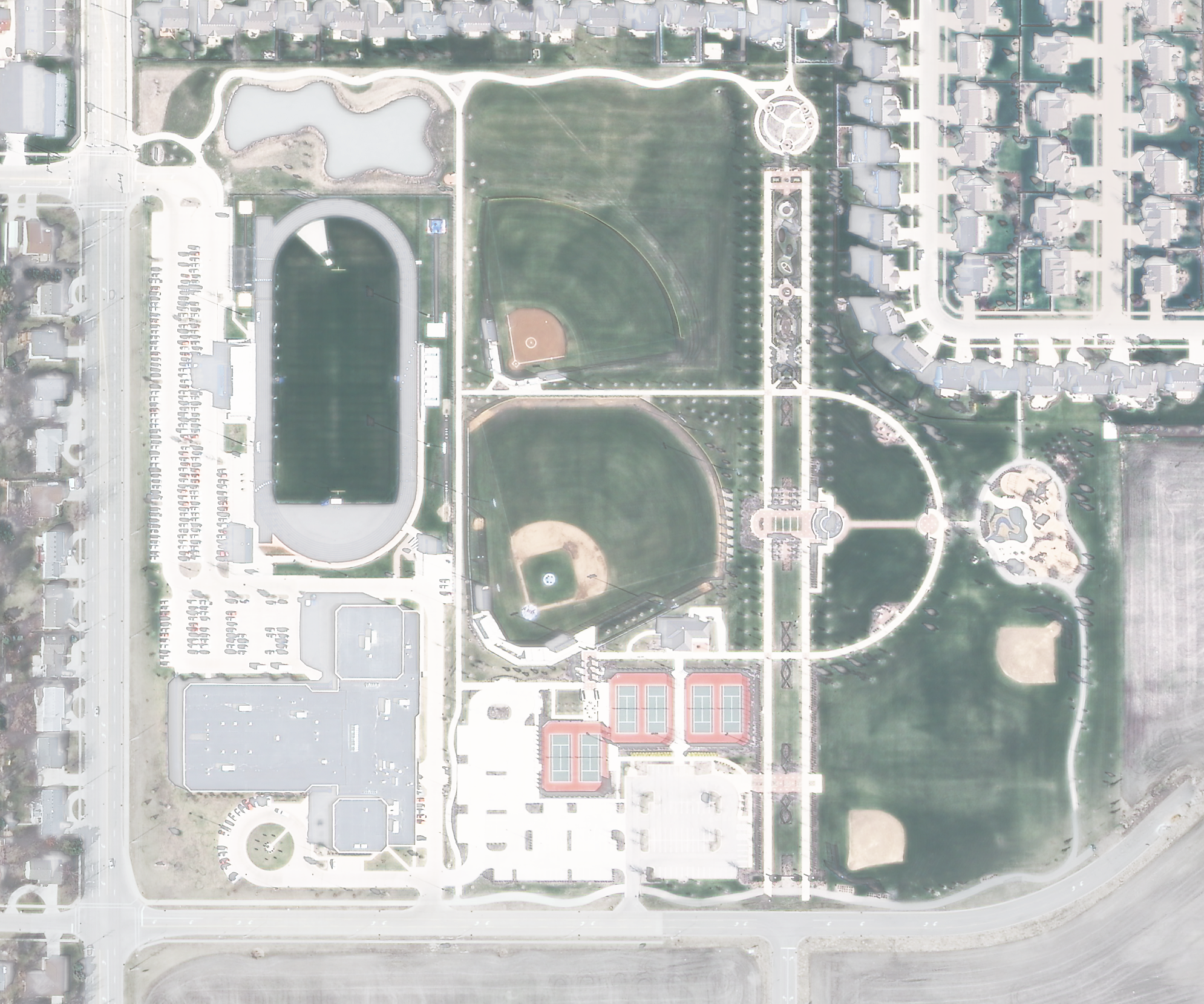
March 2011 USGS near-infrared aerial orthoimage of Central Catholic High School and McGraw Park

==== Center Street ====
In the fall of 1967, Trinity High School became a diocesan school and was renamed Central Catholic High School after the diocese requested other regional parishes join in governing and subsidizing the school. Private donations in 1991 and 1992 funded renovations to the chemistry lab, the creation of computer lab, and updates to the biology lab. In compliance with a diocesan directive, Central Catholic implemented mandatory hair sample drug testing of students beginning in 2000.

Central Catholic High School's Center Street gymnasium, nicknamed "The Pit" in the 1970s, was known for its high temperatures, loud water hammers, and for intimidating visiting teams due to the close proximity of the stands to the gym floor.

==== Airport Road ====
Church officials began discussing sites for a new school building in 1996, initially considering a west side location in the former Chicago & Alton railroad yards. This site was later rejected due to the large amount of environmental cleanup needed. In February 1998, school officials announced plans to construct a new school building in east or southeast Bloomington after renovation of the existing building was deemed too expensive. That July, the pastors' board announced fifteen acres of Deneen family farmland in east Bloomington were reserved for a new school building. An $11 million fundraising effort to build a new school on the land gifted to the diocese began in 2001.

Construction started on 12 August 2002 with an estimated cost of $11.4 million. (Note: equivalent to $20,400,000 in 2025) In June 2003, Mark Williams - pastor of Holy Trinity Parish - announced the decision to demolish the old school building as renovation and repurposing at an estimated cost of $4 million (Note: equivalent to $7,000,000 in 2025) was considered too expensive. The new building at 1201 Airport Road opened on 25 August 2003 with 323 students enrolled that fall. In June and July 2004, the Center Street school building was razed and in the following year Bill Hundman Memorial Field was completed.

In 2005, the CCHS accountant was charged with embezzling money from the school. CCHS enrollment peaked in 2009 with 423 students. As $2,000,000 (Note: equivalent to $2,900,000 in 2025) in financial pledges for construction of the new school building were left unfulfilled, capital campaigns at the four regional Catholic parishes were started in 2011 to pay off the remaining debt. A 2013 upgrade installed school-wide wireless internet access in conjunction with a new bring your own device program. A student center and welcome center were added in summer 2015 renovations. By 2016, enrollment at the school had dropped, attributed in part to the diminished presence of State Farm Insurance in the area.

In March 2022, it was announced that the school would shift to a President-Principal model, with principal Sean Foster named as the first president of the school effective in July 2022. The next month, Chris McGraw was named the next principal with Sean Foster moving to a superintendent role.

Between 1898 and 2014, 6,556 students graduated from the school. This includes 406 students from St. Mary's High School between 1898 and 1928 as well as 2,482 students from Trinity High School between 1929 and 1967.

== Campus ==
Central Catholic High School is located on a 15-acre site at 1201 Airport Road in Bloomington, Illinois. The school property is bordered to the west by Airport Road and to the south by Cornelius Drive. McGraw Park borders the school property to the north and east.

Enclosing more than 100,000 square feet with a capacity for 500 students, the school building is divided into two wings. The academic wing contains sixteen classrooms, four science labs, two art labs, computer lab, and the student center. The social wing is bounded on one end by the 1400-seat Cvengros Gymnasium and on the other by the performing arts center - a 560-seat auditorium, audio lab, band room, and chorus room. Between are a 100-seat chapel, cafeteria, commons area, faculty dining area, welcome center, main office, weight room and four locker rooms.

A roundabout lies on the south side of the school building. On the north side is the school parking lot and Bill Hundman Memorial Field, which contains the school football field and track. CCHS uses McGraw Park facilities for baseball, softball, and tennis.

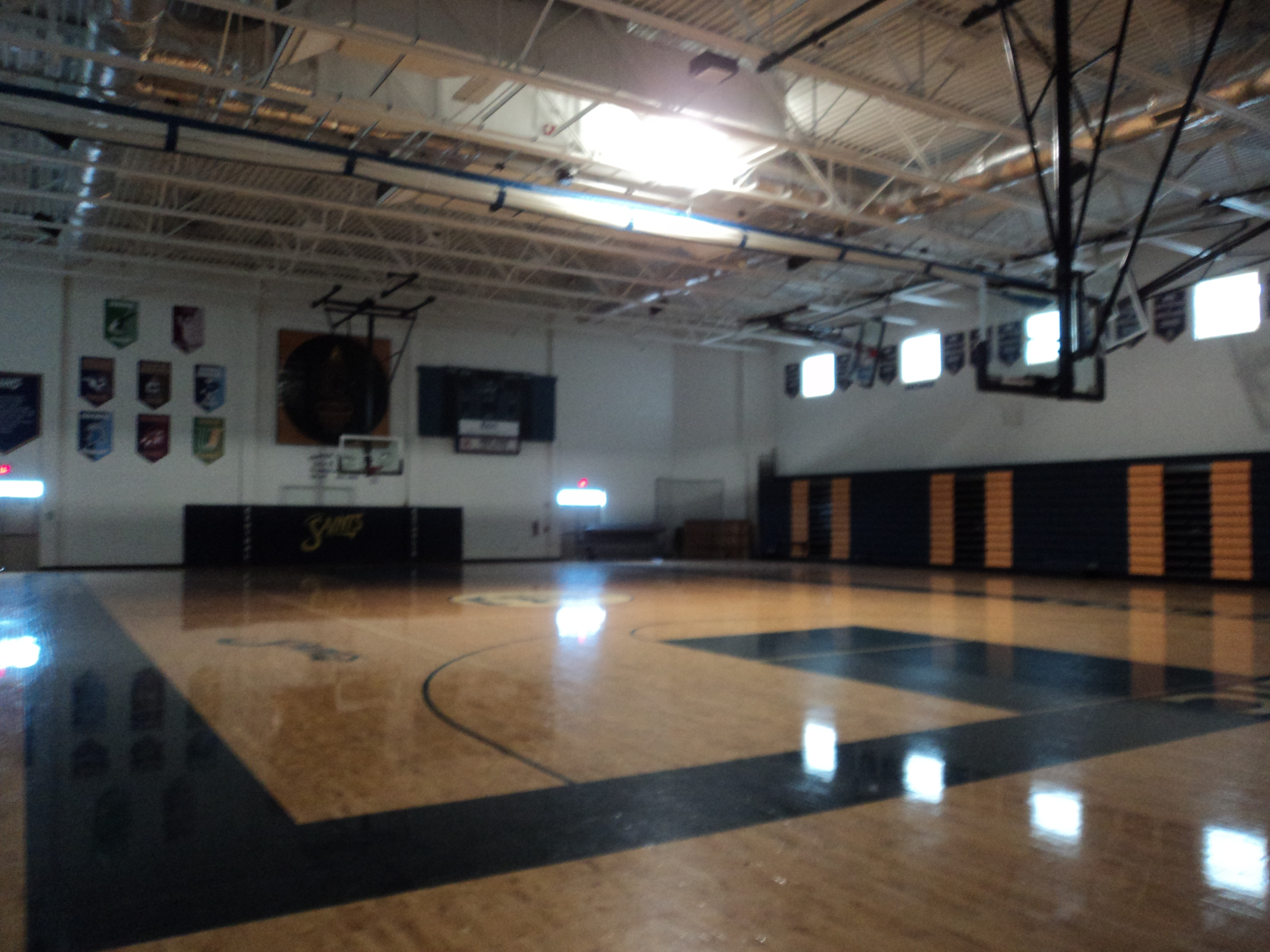
Cvengros Gymnasium

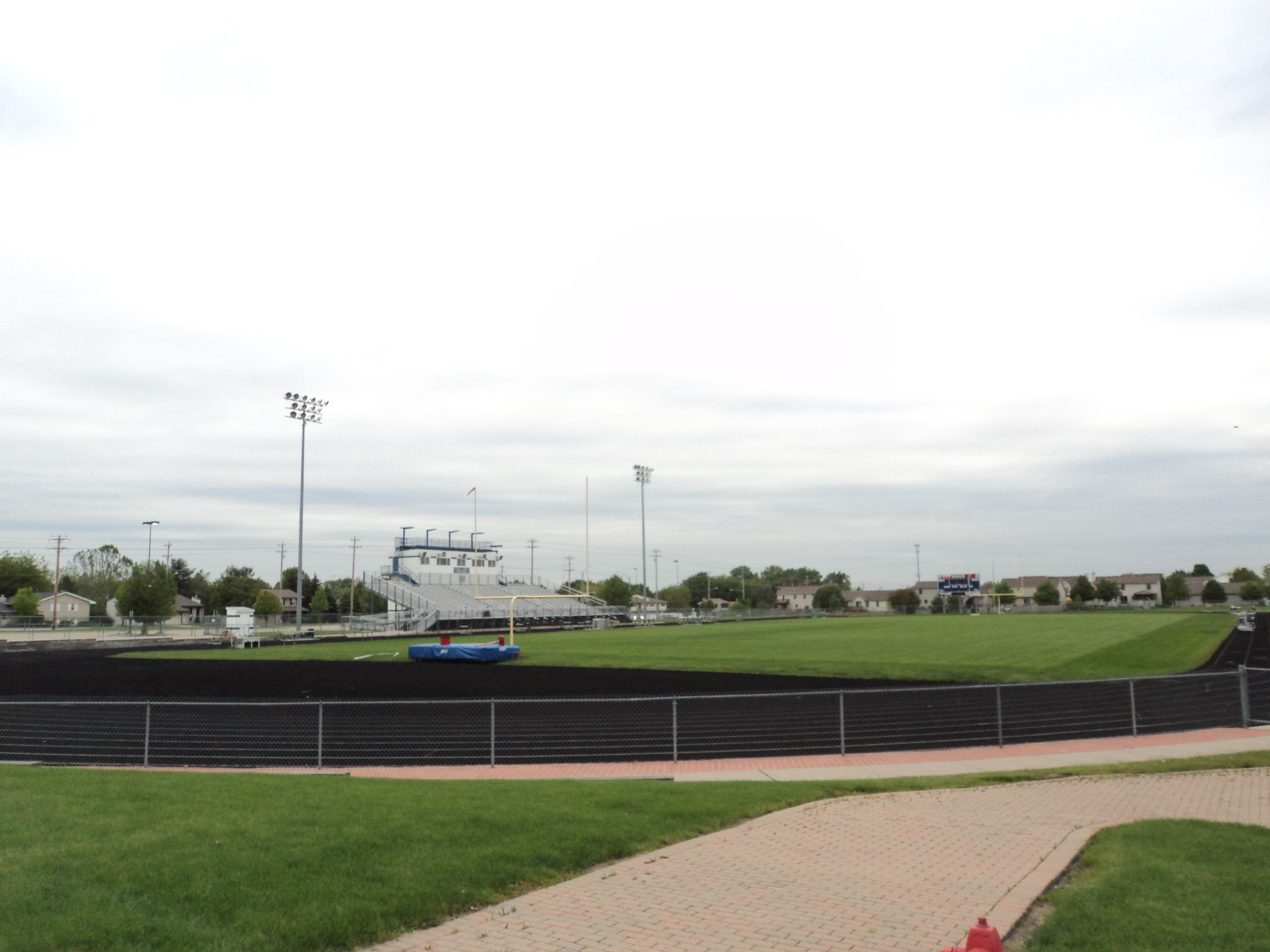
Bill Hundman Memorial Field

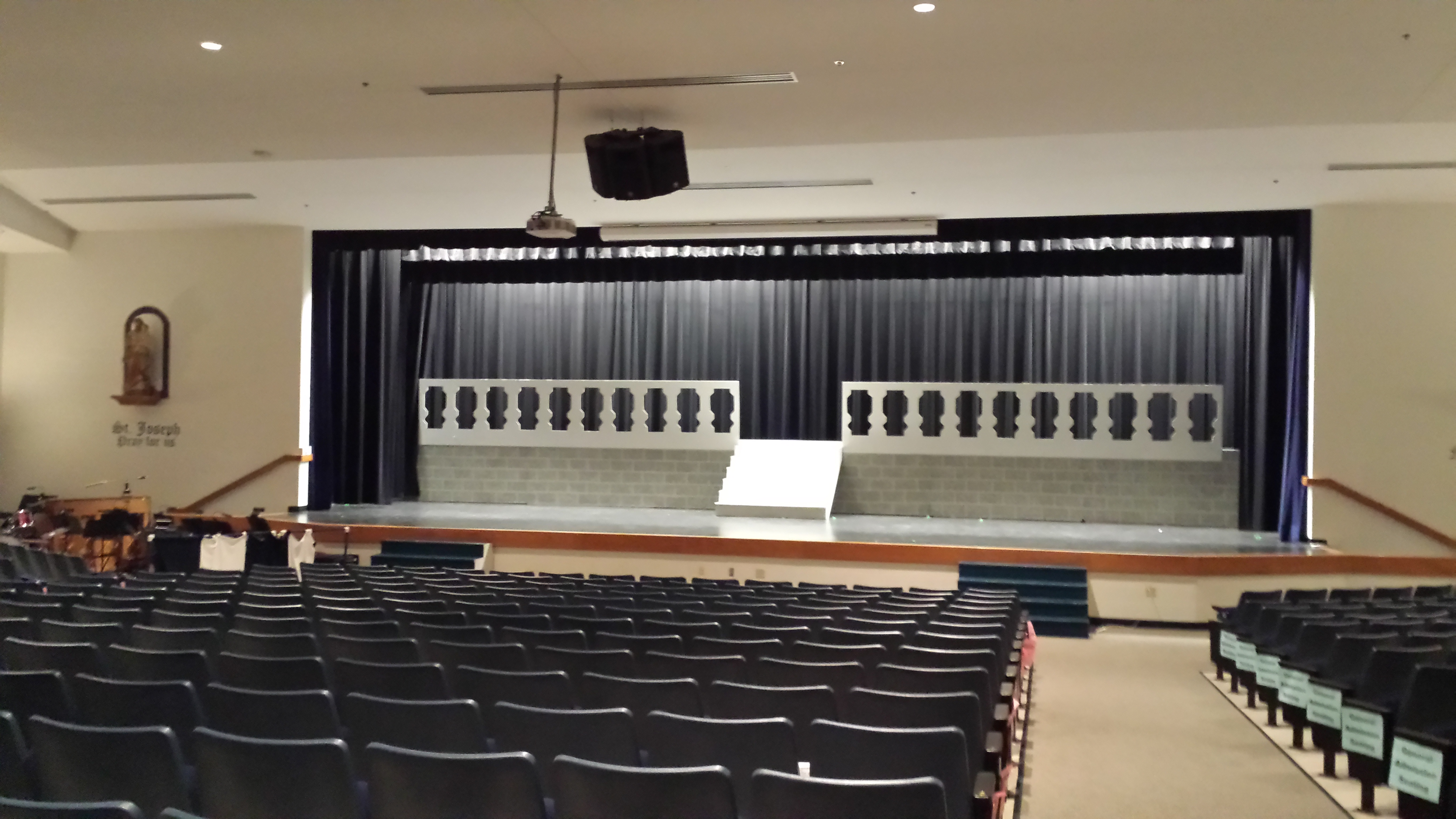
Auditorium set up for a production of the musical Cinderella

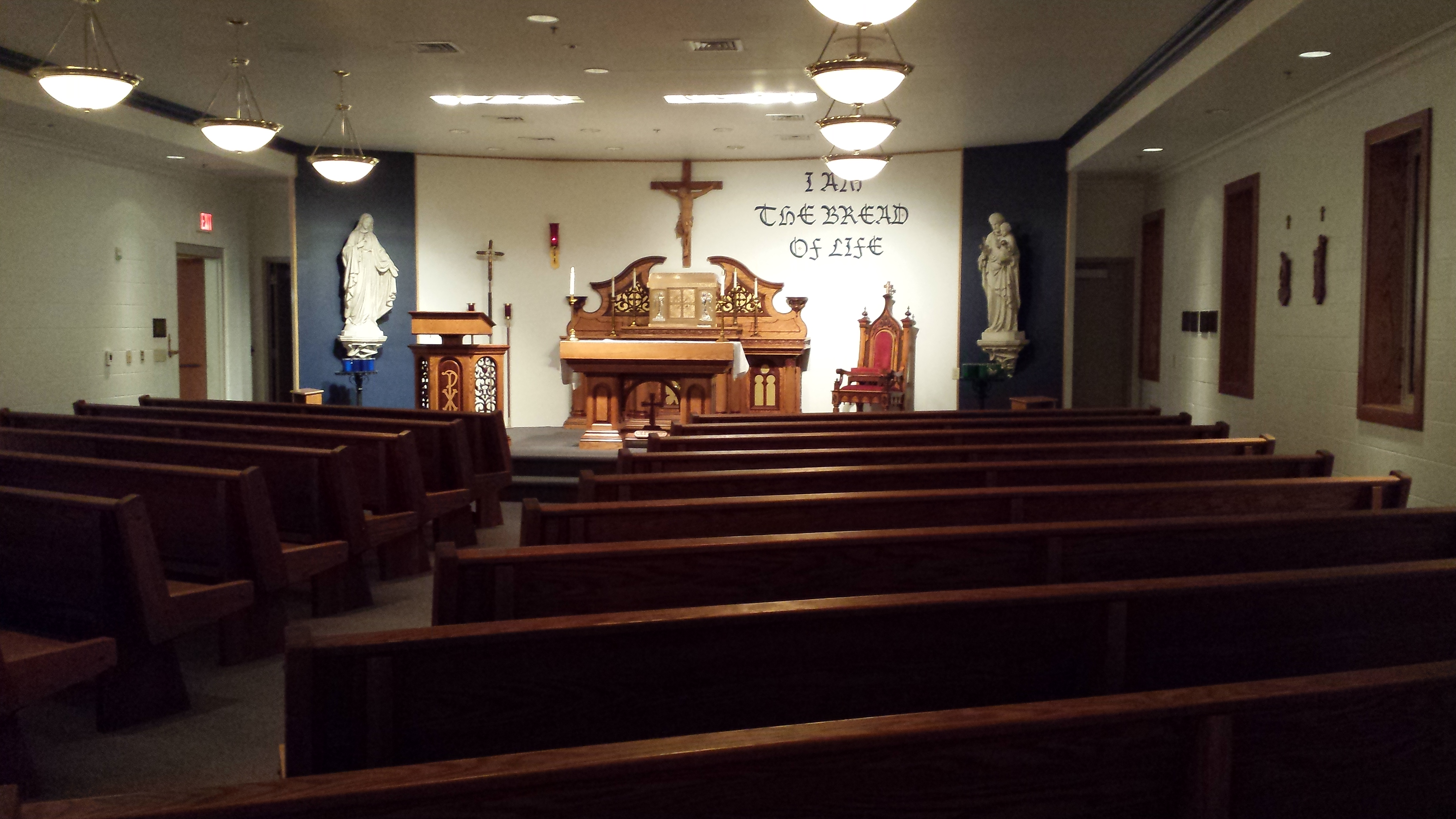
Chapel

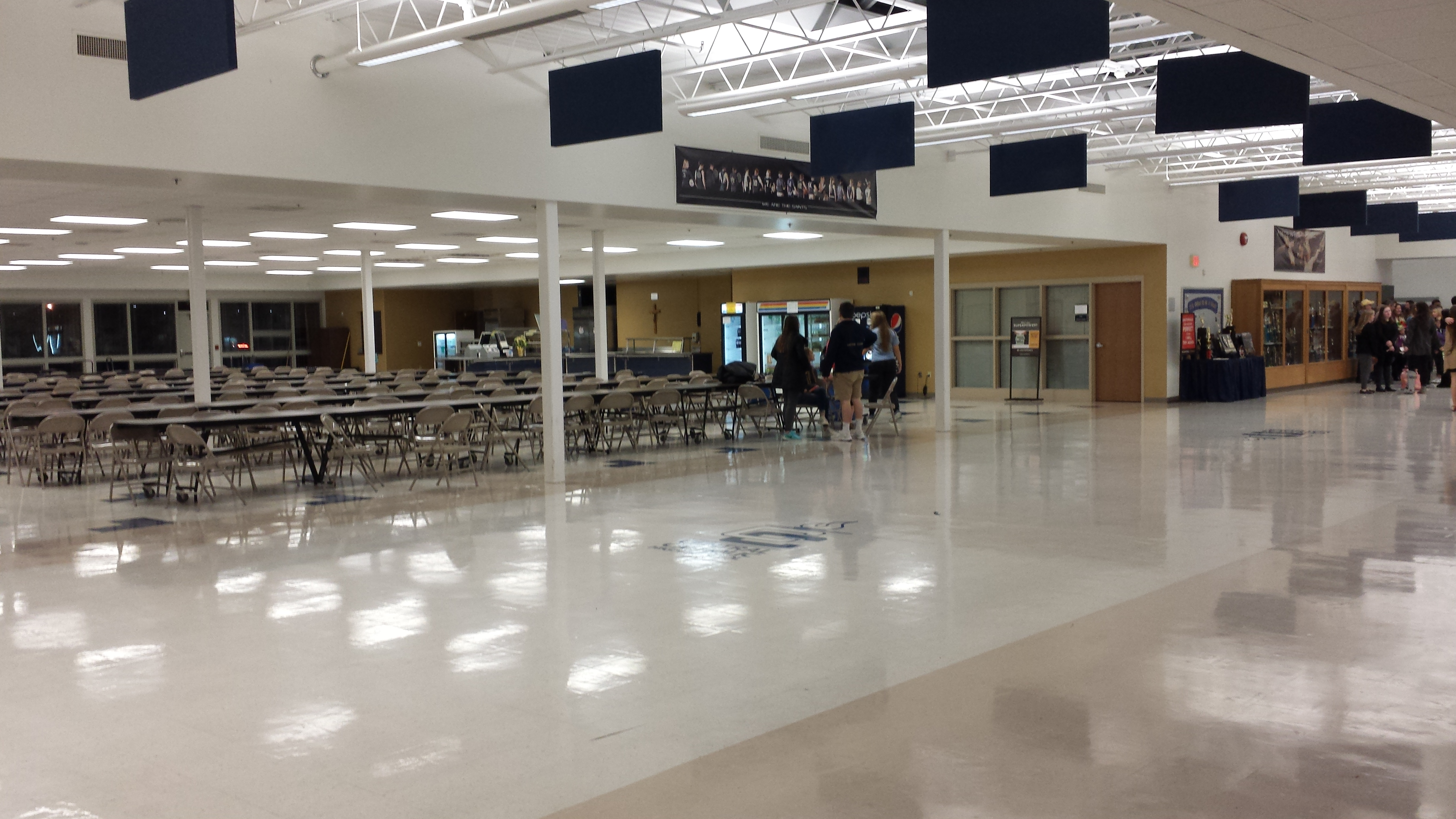
Commons area and cafeteria

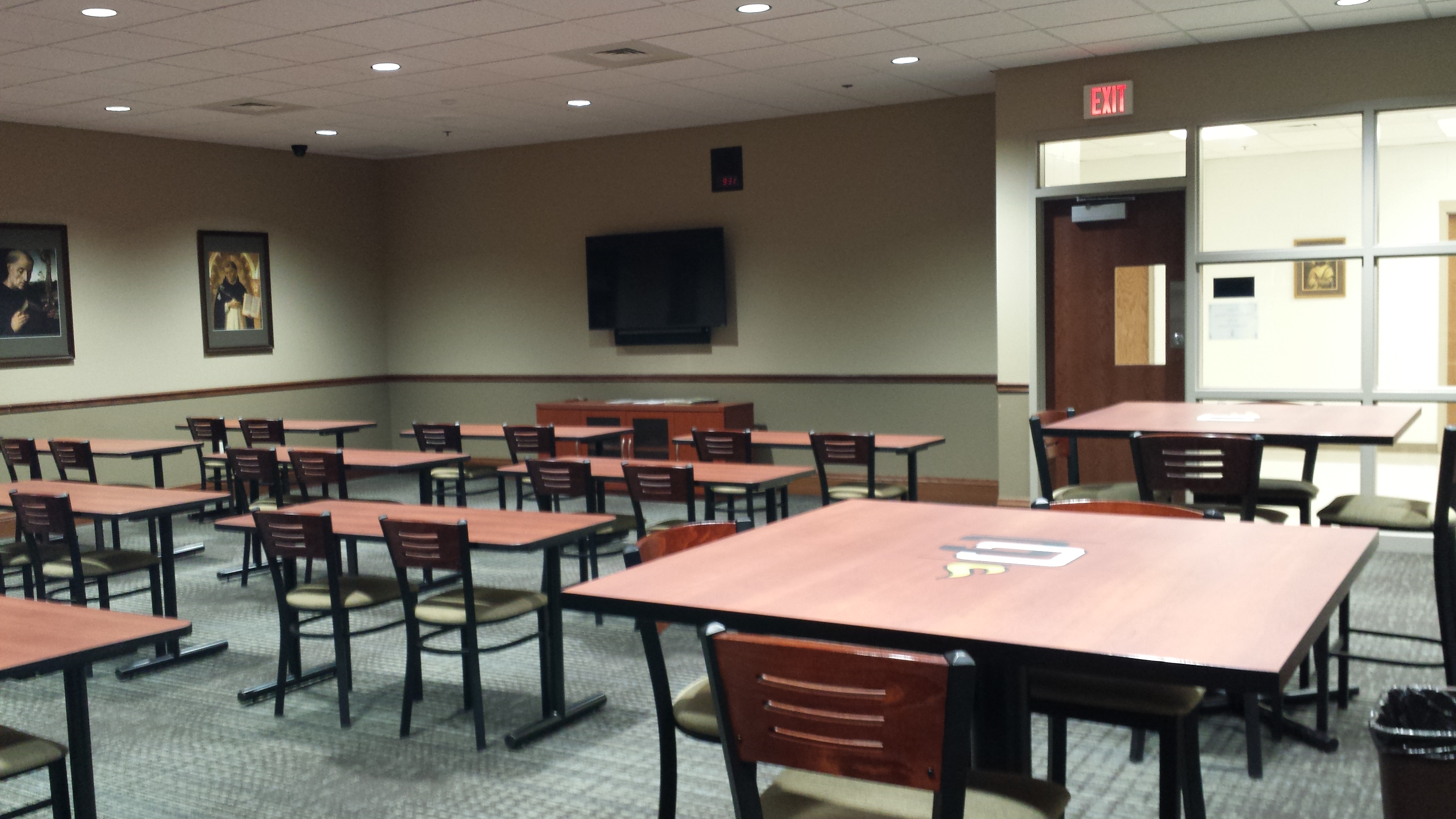
Student center

== Demographics ==
Enrollment for the 2016-2017 school year was 317. The student body in the 2016-2017 school year was 87% white, 6% Hispanic and 7% other. Also in that year, 50% of the student body was female and 50% was male. 6% of students were from families that qualify for lunch subsidies and 4% of students received special education services. 41% of students received tuition assistance in 2015 with an average of $1094 received per student.

In the 2012-2013 school year, 56% percent of teachers were female and 44% were male. More than half of the faculty has a graduate degree.

== Academics ==
=== Curriculum ===
Course requirements for graduation
Course	Credits
Theology	4
English	4
Mathematics	3
Science	3
Social Studies	2.5
Foreign Language/Fine Arts/BACC	2
Wellness (PE and Health) (Note: Taken freshman and sophomore years)	2
Consumer education	0.5
Write, cite, and communicate (Note: Taken freshman year)	0.5
Comprehensive Fine Arts (Note: Taken freshman year)	0.5
Electives	3
Minimum total credits	25

The Central Catholic High School curriculum emphasizes college preparation. The school requires a total of twenty-five credits of coursework to graduate. Each semester-long course is worth 0.5 credits. Students must also complete a diocesan religion exam, pass the state constitution exam, and perform 5 hours of community service per quarter. At least four of these quarterly hours must be connected to the Catholic Works of Mercy or assist the local parishes. More than 11,000 service hours are performed by students annually.

Students generally take electives in their junior and senior years. Central Catholic offers Advanced Placement courses in English Language and Composition, English Literature and Composition, Calculus, Chemistry, Physics, and U.S. History. On-campus dual credit introductory courses in psychology and sociology are available to juniors and seniors in partnership with Heartland Community College. Upperclassmen may also take vocational education courses through the Bloomington Area Career Center at Bloomington High School. Driver education classes are provided by Normal Community High School.

About forty-six percent of CCHS students take an art class and thirty-one percent take a music class. Approximately half of students take at least one AP course before graduating.

=== Schedule ===
The CCHS school year generally runs from late-August to late-May and is divided into two eighteen-week semesters and four nine-week quarters. Students typically take eight classes per semester. Classes are held on a block schedule with navy and gold days. There are 4 blocks per day, switching every other day with 4 other blocks. Each block is generally eighty minutes long. The CCHS school day runs from 8:20 AM to 3:10 PM.

=== Tests, rankings, and statistics ===
CCHS has a 100% four-year graduation rate. Nearly 99% of graduates between 2012 and 2016 sought a college degree or joined the military. In 2016, 84% of graduates planned to attend a four-year college or university, 14% planned to attend a two-year college, and 1% joined the workforce.

The average ACT test score for the class of 2016 was 24.5 compared to a state and national average of 20.8. This score was in the top 15% of scores nationally that year. In the 2015-2016 school year, seventy-five students taking a total of 146 AP exams produced twenty-four scores of 5 and seventy-seven scores of 3 or 4. 37% of 2017 graduates passed at least one AP test. Between 2009 and 2016 the school had seven national merit finalists, four national merit semi-finalists, and twenty-three national merit commended scholars among juniors who took the PSAT/NMSQT.

In its 2017 ranking of the most challenging high schools nationally, The Washington Post ranked Central Catholic High School 1,339th based on its Challenge Index, placing it in the top 6% of US high schools. CCHS was also ranked 54th among Illinois high schools, the most highly ranked school south of the Chicago area.

The daily student attendance rate was 96% in the 2015-2016 school year.

== Traditions and extracurriculars ==
=== Traditions ===
CCHS students raise funds for a charity selected by the senior class throughout the school year, typically donating more than $10,000 each year. Annual homecoming traditions at the school include a can sculpture competition, car caravan, and crowning of a homecoming king and queen. Each January, Central Catholic students participate in March for Life Chicago and upperclassmen travel to Washington D.C. to participate in the main March for Life. During National Catholic Schools Week, teams of CCHS students compete against each other in a school-wide Olympic-style tournament. The school ends the week with a Catholic Mass alongside students of the area Catholic elementary schools. An annual spring prom occurs in early April at Miller Park pavilion.

=== Extracurriculars ===
Central Catholic has around thirty student activities, clubs, and organizations in addition to sports teams. A school play and musical are performed each fall and spring respectively. Approximately 90% of students are involved in an extracurricular activity.

==== Athletics ====
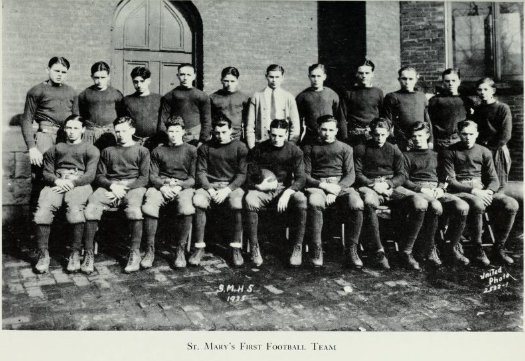
The first football team at St. Mary's High School in 1924

Central Catholic High School participates in Illinois High School Association athletics and competes in classes 1A, 2A, or 3A for different sports. It is a member of the Illini Prairie Conference. Baseball, basketball, cross country, football, golf, soccer, swimming and diving, tennis and track and field are currently offered boys' sports. Basketball, cross country, golf, soccer, softball, tennis, track and field, and volleyball are the currently offered girls' sports. More than eighty-percent of students participate in a school sport. In 2014, fourteen out of ninety graduates signed for collegiate sports.

Competitive sports at the high school date to the 1920s. Football started in 1924 at St. Mary's High School under coach Earl Peirce followed by a boys' basketball team in 1926 under coach Charley Bennett and a baseball team in 1928 under coach Bill Connors. The baseball team was undefeated in 1929 and 1930. Before the IHSA allowed private schools to participate in 1941, the boys' basketball team won State Catholic Tournament championships under Bennett in 1927 and 1928 and placed second in the three years following. It was also the State Catholic Tournament champion in 1933 under coach John Callans and in 1940 and 1941 under coach Essau Dotlich.

CCHS joined the Corn Belt Conference as a founding member in 1950. The conference merged with the former Heart of Illinois Conference in 1972, but CCHS later rejoined the Corn Belt Conference when it re-formed in 1978. After the merging of the Corn Belt and the Okaw Valley conferences beginning in the 2017-18 school year, CCHS became a member of the resulting Illini Prairie Conference.

Central Catholic High School is the first school in the state of Illinois to win state football titles in four different classes.

Notable IHSA state appearances
School year	Sport	Place	Class
1975 – 1976	Boys' golf	3rd	A
1982 – 1983	Football	1st	2A
1982 – 1983	Girls' basketball	4th	A
1983 – 1984	Football	2nd	2A
1982 – 1983	Boys' golf	3rd	A
1983 – 1984	Boys' golf	3rd	A
1987 – 1988	Football	1st	1A
1990 – 1991	Football	2nd	1A
1994 – 1995	Football	1st	3A
2003 – 2004	Volleyball	3rd	A
2007 – 2008	Football	2nd	4A
2007 – 2008	Girls' track and field	3rd	A
2008 – 2009	Football	1st	4A
2008 – 2009	Girls' golf	3rd	A
2008 – 2009	Girls' track and field	1st	1A
2009 – 2010	Girls' basketball	1st	2A
2009 – 2010	Girls' golf	2nd	A
2009 – 2010	Girls' track and field	2nd	1A
2010 – 2011	Girls' basketball	2nd	2A
2010 – 2011	Volleyball	2nd	2A
2013 – 2014	Boys' basketball	1st	2A
2014 – 2015	Girls' basketball	3rd	2A
2015 – 2016	Volleyball	1st	2A
2016 – 2017	Girls' tennis	3rd	1A
2016 – 2017	Volleyball	4th	2A
2016 – 2017	Girls' basketball	2nd	2A

== Football practice field ==
On 10 November 2014, the Bloomington city council voted 5-4 to purchase four acres of land near McGraw Park in Empire Business Park using state funds and to rent the land to CCHS for use as a football practice field. The council voted with the understanding the current football practice field on land owned by the Central Illinois Regional Airport was in a Federal Aviation Agency restricted flight path zone and the school would have to move to another location in 2015. In 2009, state senator and CCHS alum Bill Brady had arranged a $750,000 state legislative grant for the purchase as part of a General Assembly capital bill. Alderman Jim Fruin, another CCHS alum, voted in favor. CCHS agreed to spend at least $20,000 to improve the land, pay an annual rent of $1,700, and to maintain, mow, and clean the field. The annual cost to the city was estimated to be $2,500 and the land was to be used as a park when not in use by the school.

After the vote, alderman Joni Painter discovered from the school website that Fruin was a member of the CCHS Board of Trustees, an interest not previously disclosed. Council members also learned CCHS could renew the lease for its current practice field for up to another fifteen years. Fruin and CCHS principal Sean Foster stated they had believed the contract could not be renewed past 2015. Mayor Tari Renner refused to sign-off on the approval pending an attorney general opinion on whether any conflict of interest law or ordinance was violated. Fruin stated he would defer to the attorney general and that he did not believe there was a conflict of interest because trustees serve only an advisory role. A Pantagraph editorial later suggested several other potential conflicts of interest: the Deneen family - who donated land for the new school building - were stakeholders in the development firm from which the land would be purchased, Fruin's real estate agency - Coldwell Banker - was to oversee the transaction though he would have no role, and CCHS football coach Mike Moews is the brother of city parks superintendent Bobby Moews.

At the 24 November 2014 council meeting, Painter moved to reconsider the agreement. The council unanimously rejected the land deal after Fruin recused himself from the vote. The council then discussed other potential uses for the money despite prior statements by senator Bill Brady that the money could be reallocated to other communities in his district if it was not used to expand McGraw Park. Renner stated the grant could be used for any Bloomington parks or trails. According to Brady, the money was directed solely toward McGraw Park at the direction of former Bloomington mayor Steve Stockton. Stockton disputed this characterization, stating he had discussed alternative uses for the money.

On 21 November 2014 the Illinois Senate Republican Caucus asked the Illinois Department of Commerce and Economic Opportunity to halt the grant. Learning of this two weeks later, Renner disagreed the caucus had authority to prevent use of the money. The city council continued discussions of how to allocate the money while Brady formed a committee headed by former Bloomington mayor Jesse Smart to determine how the grant should be used. On 7 December 2014 the Bloomington City Council approved use of the grant money for improvements to the Constitution Trail, Miller Park pavilion, and Sunnyside Park.

CCHS renewed its lease for the airport practice field in mid-December 2014. On 14 January 2015, Brady's grant committee completed its review and recommended allocating money for the Sunnyside Park and Miller Park pavilion projects in Bloomington as well as three other projects in Lake Bloomington, Delavan, Illinois, and McLean, Illinois. The conflict of interest review was called off after the 21 November vote, though the city legal department clarified conflicts of interest in the city code. As of December 2015 none of the communities have received any money from the grant pending passage of a state budget.

== Awards and recognition ==
CCHS was named a 2017 National Blue Ribbon School, one of 342 in the nation and one of 17 in Illinois.

== Notable alumni ==
- Bill Brady (Illinois politician) is a former Republican member of the Illinois Senate and senate minority leader representing the 44th Legislative District.
- Dan Brady (Illinois politician) is a former Republican member of the Illinois House of Representatives, representing the 105th district and current mayor of Bloomington.
- Josh Brent is a former nose tackle for the Dallas Cowboys.
- Michael Hoomanawanui is a former tight end for the New Orleans Saints and a champion of Super Bowl XLIX.
- John Rave is a professional baseball outfielder for the Kansas City Royals of Major League Baseball.

== Former principals ==
- Mary Kremer (19??–1984)
- Richard Morehouse (1984–1991): CCHS enrollment briefly fell below 200 students in 1989 before increasing by 25% near the end of Morehouse's tenure.
- Joy Allen (1991–2014): Under Joy Allen, CCHS increased enrollment from 213 students in 1991 to 346 students in 2014. Allen oversaw the planning, design, and capital campaigns for the Airport Road school building and Bill Hundman Memorial Field. During her tenure, Central Catholic increased ACT test scores, added additional Advanced Placement courses, and broadened its curriculum.
