= Paxton-Buckley-Loda High School =

Location
- 700 West Orleans Street; Paxton, Illinois 60957; United States; 40.4612°N 88.1086°W

Information
- Type: Public secondary
- School district: Paxton-Buckley-Loda Community Unit School District 10
- Principal: Travis Duley
- Teaching staff: 34.50 (on an FTE basis)
- Grades: 9–12
- Enrollment: 374 (2023-2024)
- Student to teacher ratio: 10.84
- Color
- Athletics conference: Illini Prairie Conference
- Nickname: Panthers
- Yearbook: Visions
- Website: www.pblunit10.com/o/senior-high

Paxton-Buckley-Loda High School is a public high school located in Paxton, Illinois. Founded in 1990, it serves the communities of Paxton, Buckley and Loda. PBL had an enrollment of 472 students for the 2016–17 school year.

== History ==
In 1990, declining enrollment at Buckley-Loda High School led to a consolidation with Paxton High School. A new school building was constructed to field all of the students, and the histories of the individual schools were left behind as the new PBL collaboration took effect. The current high school draws students from five Illinois counties, but the bulk of the student body hails from Ford and Iroquois counties.

== Demographics ==
PBL is 93 percent white, six percent Hispanic, and one percent black.

== Academics ==
Paxton-Buckley-Loda offers Advanced Placement classes. About a third of PBL students take an AP class. The PBL High School Math Team placed sixth overall at the state competition in 2026, while its oral team won the state championship and seven other PBL teams placed in the top ten.

== Performing arts ==
PBL has a competitive show choir, nicknamed "Unlimited".
