= Josh Brent =

American football player (born 1988)

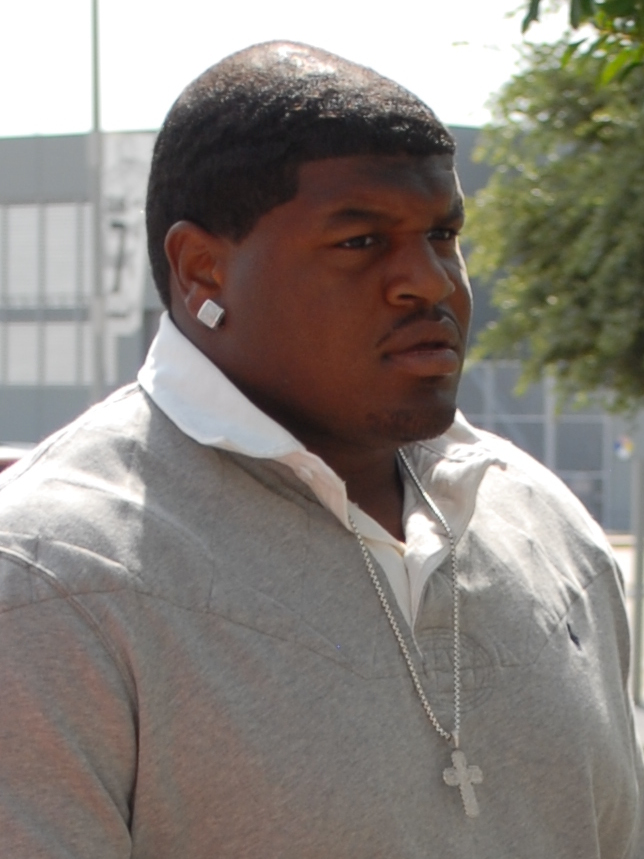
- Brent in 2012

No. 92, 95
- Position: Defensive tackle

Personal information
- Born: January 30, 1988 (age 38); Tulare, California, U.S.
- Listed height: 6 ft 2 in (1.88 m)
- Listed weight: 320 lb (145 kg)

Career information
- High school: Central Catholic (Bloomington, Illinois)
- College: Illinois
- Supplemental draft: 2010: 7th round

Career history
- Dallas Cowboys (2010–2012, 2014)

Career NFL statistics
- Total tackles: 46
- Sacks: 1.5
- Forced fumbles: 1
- Stats at Pro Football Reference

Joshua Aaron Price-Brent (born January 30, 1988) is an American former professional football player who was a defensive tackle for the Dallas Cowboys of National Football League (NFL). He played college football for the Illinois Fighting Illini and was selected by the Cowboys in the seventh round of the 2010 NFL supplemental draft. Brent's career was cut short by a DUI car crash in 2012 that killed his teammate Jerry Brown, leading to his retirement two years later.

== Early life ==
Brent was born in Tulare, California on January 30, 1988, the son of LaTasha Brent, and grew up in Bloomington, Illinois, where he attended Central Catholic High School. As a junior, he recorded 109 tackles, 31 for losses and 6 sacks, he also earned All-Area, All-Region and All-State honors. As a senior, he recorded 90 tackles, 19 for losses and 8 sacks, he was also named a PrepStar All-American, Chicago Tribune first-team All-State, SuperPrep All-American and Champaign News-Gazette first-team All-State.

Coming out of high school, Brent was ranked the no. 3 in the "Best of the Midwest" by the Detroit Free Press, rated among the Top-100 recruits nationally at 80th and a four-star recruit by Rivals.com and by Scout.com. He also ranked the 11th-best player in the Midwest by SuperPrep, as well as the ninth-best defensive tackle and fifth ranked player in the state of Illinois by Rivals.com. He was also ranked 13th at defensive tackle in the nation by Scout.com.

While at Central Catholic, Brent was a four-year letterman in basketball and track. As a freshman he made the state finals in the shot put, as a sophomore and junior, he was a state runner-up. He was also a three-time all-state selection in track. He was also teammates with tight end Michael Hoomanawanui.

== College career ==
Brent attended the University of Illinois Urbana–Champaign, where he played football for the Fighting Illini. In 2007, as a true freshman, Brent played in 10 games, posting 8 tackles (2 for loss), 0.5 sacks and a quarterback pressure. In 2008 as a sophomore, he appeared in 10 games (8 starts), registering 34 tackles, 1.5 sacks, 4 quarterback pressures and one fumble recovery.

In 2009 as a junior, he started all 12 games, recording 29 tackles (7 for loss), 3 sacks, 3 forced fumbles and one fumble recovery. He finished his college career with 71 tackles (17.5 for loss), 5 sacks, 3 forced fumbles and 3 fumble recoveries, while playing in 33 games (20 starts).

== Professional career ==
Pre-draft measurables
Height	Weight	40-yard dash	10-yard split	20-yard split	20-yard shuttle	Three-cone drill	Vertical jump	Broad jump	Bench press
6 ft 1 3/8 in (1.86 m)	320 lb (145 kg)	5.38 s	1.81 s	3.07 s	4.74 s	7.71 s	29.0 in (0.74 m)	8 ft 10 in (2.69 m)	22 reps
All values from Pro Day

Brent decided to enter the NFL after he was ruled academically ineligible to play his senior season. Because he missed the filing deadline for the regular draft, he was eligible to apply for the 2010 supplemental draft and was taken in the seventh round by the Dallas Cowboys, who had not drafted any players this way since 1995. As a rookie, he surprised observers by making the team, even though he was limited in the early part of training camp with a broken left hand. During the season, he was given around 15 plays per game and posted 17 tackles.

He received his first career starts in 2012 and was coming on strong as a key player on the defensive line, while replacing an injured Jay Ratliff. On December 8, 2012, he clipped a curb and flipped his car on the eastbound access road of Texas State Highway 114 (John W. Carpenter Freeway) at 2:21 a.m. while speeding and driving under the influence, killing his passenger, college and Cowboys teammate Jerry Brown. This accident occurred one day before playing against the Cincinnati Bengals, a game with playoff implications for both sides in which the Bengals were already heavily favored. Head coach Jason Garrett told the team of the incident while they were on the plane about to fly to Cincinnati.

That Saturday, the players held emotional meetings and hung the jerseys of Brent and Brown in their locker room. The Cowboys won that game 20–19. Brent was later placed on the reserve/non-football illness list after being charged for the death of Jerry Brown.

For Brown's memorial service, Stacey Jackson (Brown's mother) in a support gesture, requested Brent to meet with the family at the airport and sit with them at the event. The next game against the Pittsburgh Steelers, he was invited by teammates to sit on the Cowboys sideline. Upon hearing how his presence was being perceived by the CBS Sports commentators during the game and the social network sites, he approached the Cowboys staff and excused himself for the second half. After the incident, the NFL and the team would not allow him to be on the sidelines for the rest of the season.

Brent announced his retirement on July 18, 2013, to focus on his off-the-field issues pertaining to the charges of intoxicated manslaughter. After serving his punishment in prison and going through a rehabilitation process, he was reinstated by the NFL following a 10-game suspension. On November 11, 2014, he was activated from the team's reserve/suspended list. Because of the time he missed away from the game, he wasn't in playing shape and needed until week 12 to return to game action. After being active in three games as a reserve player, he would miss the last four with a calf strain. He registered two tackles and played an average of 20 snaps in each of the Cowboys' playoff contests.

Brent was placed on the reserve/retired list on May 8, 2015. Per head coach Jason Garrett, "Brent is focused more on his life away from football. We are impressed at how he's recovered, and wish him well going forward". On September 25, 2015, the Cowboys announced that Brent had accepted a position in their scouting department.

== Legal troubles ==
Brent pleaded guilty to a charge of driving under the influence on June 2, 2009, as a result of an incident from the previous February. He was sentenced to two years' probation and 60 days in jail. He was also fined an undisclosed amount and ordered to undergo 200 hours of community service.

On December 8, 2012, Brent was charged with intoxication manslaughter in Irving, Texas, after a motor vehicle accident, in which he was the driver, killed his teammate, Jerry Brown. Police documents showed that Brent was driving at least 110 miles per hour (180 km/h) and may have been driving as fast as 134 mph (216 km/h) right before the crash, on a road where the posted speed limit was 45 mph (72 km/h). Brent later failed a sobriety test and would face two to 20 years in prison if convicted. Brent was found by the police pulling out his friend and teammate. Jerry Brown's mother forgave Brent and stated she hoped Brent would not be prosecuted.

On December 26, 2012, a grand jury indicted Brent on one count of intoxication manslaughter. Brent was represented by attorneys Deandra Grant and George Milner. On May 24, 2013, the Dallas district attorney requested to revoke Brent's bail for not adhering to the monitoring conditions and send him to jail to await trial. The judge denied the request and ordered additional forms of monitoring.

He was sent back to jail on June 27, 2013, after it was revealed that he had failed a drug test on June 19. Before this, he had also failed another drug test in late May, testing positive for marijuana both times. He was released from jail due to a court order on July 7, 2013. On January 24, 2014, Brent was found guilty of intoxication manslaughter in the death of Jerry Brown and sentenced to 180 days in jail and 10 years' probation.

On June 30, 2019, Josh Brent was arrested for public intoxication in a Wendy's restaurant parking lot in Coppell, Texas. Brent resisted arrest, and was ultimately tased by local police. The incident was captured on a spectators cell phone and circulated on social media platforms. A caller reported a man sitting in the grass and was believed to be talking to himself. Police arrived to perform a welfare check and determined him to be intoxicated. During the arrest efforts, witnesses indicate Brent was said to be declaring, "I'm a Cowboy; you can Google me. I'm Josh Brent."

== See also ==
=== Other NFL players involved in DUI manslaughter incidents ===
- Jeff Alm
- Donté Stallworth
- Henry Ruggs
