= 1993 Quincy Hawks football team =

American college football season

1993 Quincy Hawks football

IBFC champion
- Conference: Illini–Badger Football Conference
- Record: 9–0 (6–0 IBFC)
- Head coach: Ron Taylor (1st season)
- Defensive coordinator: John Morris (1st season)
- Captains: Allan George; Chris Koerner; Mike Mahn
- Home stadium: QU Stadium

1993 Illini–Badger Football Conference standings
	Conf.					Overall
Team	W		L		T	W		L		T
Quincy $	6	–	0	–	0	9	–	0	–	0
Greenville	5	–	1	–	0	8	–	2	–	0
MacMurray	3	–	3	–	0	6	–	4	–	0
Concordia (WI)	3	–	3	–	0	5	–	4	–	0
Eureka	3	–	3	–	0	3	–	7	–	0
Lakeland	1	–	5	–	0	1	–	9	–	0
Concordia (IL)	0	–	6	–	0	0	–	10	–	0
$ – Conference champion

The 1993 Quincy Hawks football team was an American football team that represented Quincy University in the Illini–Badger Football Conference (IBFC) during the 1993 NCAA Division III football season. In their first year under head coach Ron Taylor, the Hawks compiled a perfect 9–0 record (6–0 in conference games), won the IBFC championship, and outscored opponents by a total of 326 to 144. The team was inducted into the Quincy University Hall of Fame in 2017.

The team ran a balanced offense with 1,736 rushing yards and 1,649 passing yards. On defense, the team gave up 851 rushing yards and 1,413 passing yards. The team's individual statistical leaders included quarterback Jake Ryan with 1,411 passing yards and 13 passing touchdowns; fullback Rob Munson with 1,085 rushing yards and 15 touchdowns on 193 carries; and wide receiver Nobie Gooden with 59 catches for 840 yards and 11 touchdowns.

Gooden was selected as the Illini-Badger Conference Co-Player of the Year. Ten Quincy players were also selected as first-team honorees on the Illini-Badger all-star team: Gooden at wide receiver; Ryan at quarterback; Munson at running back; Chris Koeaner at tight end; Allen George on offensive line; William Wims and Tony Amato on defensive line; Ray Lock at linebacker; back Carlos Wiley at defensive back; and Dock Harris at kicker.

The team played its home games at QU Stadium in Quincy, Illinois.

== Schedule ==
Date	Opponent	Site	Result	Attendance	Source
September 4	at Kentucky Wesleyan*	Rash Stadium; Owensboro, KY	W 36–25	850–1,000	
September 18	Central Methodist*	QU Stadium; Quincy, IL	W 35–21	875	
September 25	MacMurray	QU Stadium; Quincy, IL	W 37–0	615	
October 2	at Eureka	Eureka, IL	W 24–23	800	
October 9	at Illinois Benedictine	Lisle, IL	W 17–14	850	
October 16	Greenville	QU Stadium; Quincy, IL	W 49–14	828	
October 23	at Lakeland	Sheboygan, Wi	W 65–6	650	
November 6	Concordia (WI)	QU Stadium; Quincy, IL	W 42–21	575	
November 13	at Culver–Stockton*	Canton, MO	W 21–20	950	
*Non-conference game
