= Arthur Lidov =

American artist

Arthur Herschel Lidov
- Born: June 14, 1917; Chicago, Illinois
- Died: December 29, 1990 (aged 73); Poughquag, New York
- Education: University of Chicago, Sociology, Graduate Fellow in Art History
- Occupations: Artist, muralist, inventor and medical illustrator.
- Organization: University of Chicago
- Notable work: Cover art, First edition of Ray Bradbury's Martian Chronicles, asst. murals, inventor of Insertable Spokeless Wheel.
- Style: Social Realism
- Partner: Alexandra Wool
- Children: Mika Lidov (daughter), Hart Lidov (son)

Arthur Hershel Lidov (June 14, 1917 – December 29, 1990) was an artist, illustrator, muralist, sculptor and inventor. Besides serving many national advertisers, he contributed his artistic expression to Life, Time, Fortune, The Saturday Evening Post and other general and special-interest magazines.

== Education ==
Lidov, who was born in Chicago earned a degree in sociology from the University of Chicago in 1936 and was a Graduate Fellow in Art History in 1938 and 1939. As an artist, Lidov was largely self-taught, specializing in scientific and technical graphics.

== Career ==
Arthur Lidov created the cover art for the 1950 first edition copy of The Martian Chronicle by Ray Bradbury. He contributed artistic backgrounds to many of the major magazines of his time such as Time, Fortune, The Saturday Evening Post and other special-interest magazines. Lidov invented the Insertable Spokeless Wheel.

=== Murals ===
Murals were produced from 1934 to 1943 in the United States through the Section of Painting and Sculpture, later called the Section of Fine Arts, of the Treasury Department.

- The Walter S. Christopher School, 5042 South Artesian Ave in the Gage Park neighborhood of Chicago contains three WPA tempera-on-plaster-on-presswood murals depicting Characters from Children’s Literature. The mural was restored in 1999.
- The Chillicothe, Illinois Post office contains a Section of Fine Arts mural entitled Rail Roading painted using egg tempera on gesso in 1942.

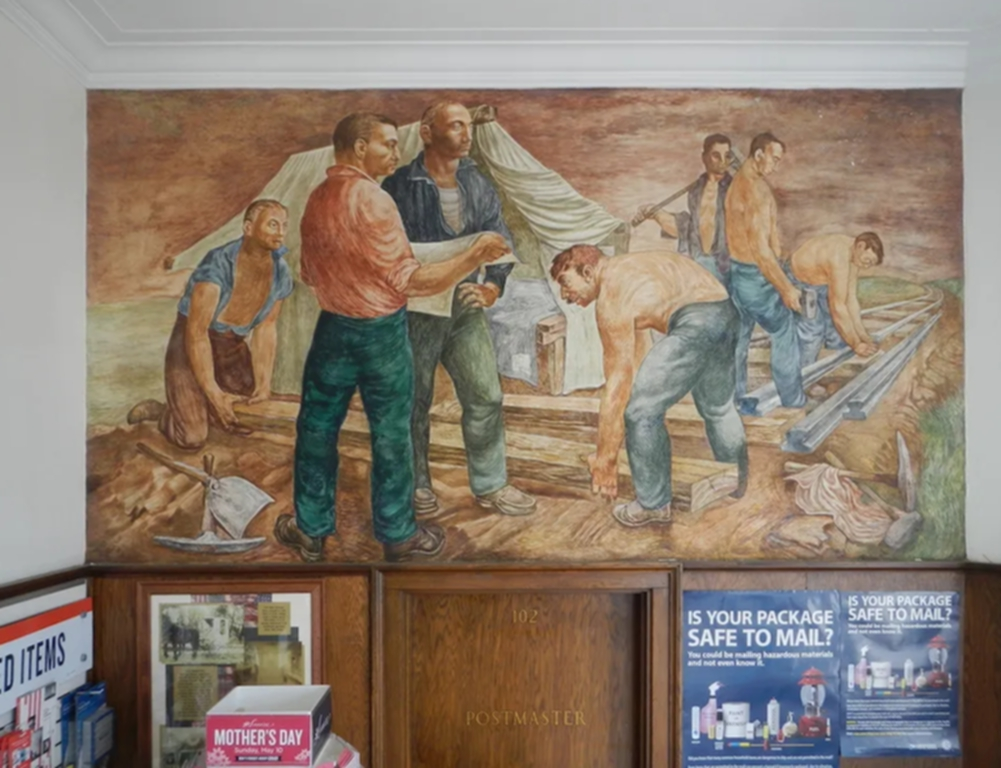
Rail Roading by Arthur Herschel Lidov

== Honors ==
- Works Progress Administration: Murals and Sculptures Commissions 1939–1943
- Select Exhibitions: Art Institute of Chicago, 1933, 1934, 1941.
- Pineapple Gallery, 1943
- National Academy of Art, 1958.
- Museum of Modern Art, 1962.
- J. Walter Thompson Gallery, 1964.

== Awards ==
- Art Director's Club Award, 1952, 1953, and 1959.
- Illustrator's Club, NY, 1963, 1973, and 1974.
- American Institute of Graphic Arts Award, 1963

== Personal life ==
Lidov was born on June 14, 1917, in Chicago, Illinois and died in his sleep on December 29, 1990, at his home in Poughquag, New York. Besides his wife, Alexandra Wool, also a painter, he was survived by his daughter, Mika and son, Hart.
