= Jerry Brown (gridiron football) =

American gridiron football player (1987–2012)

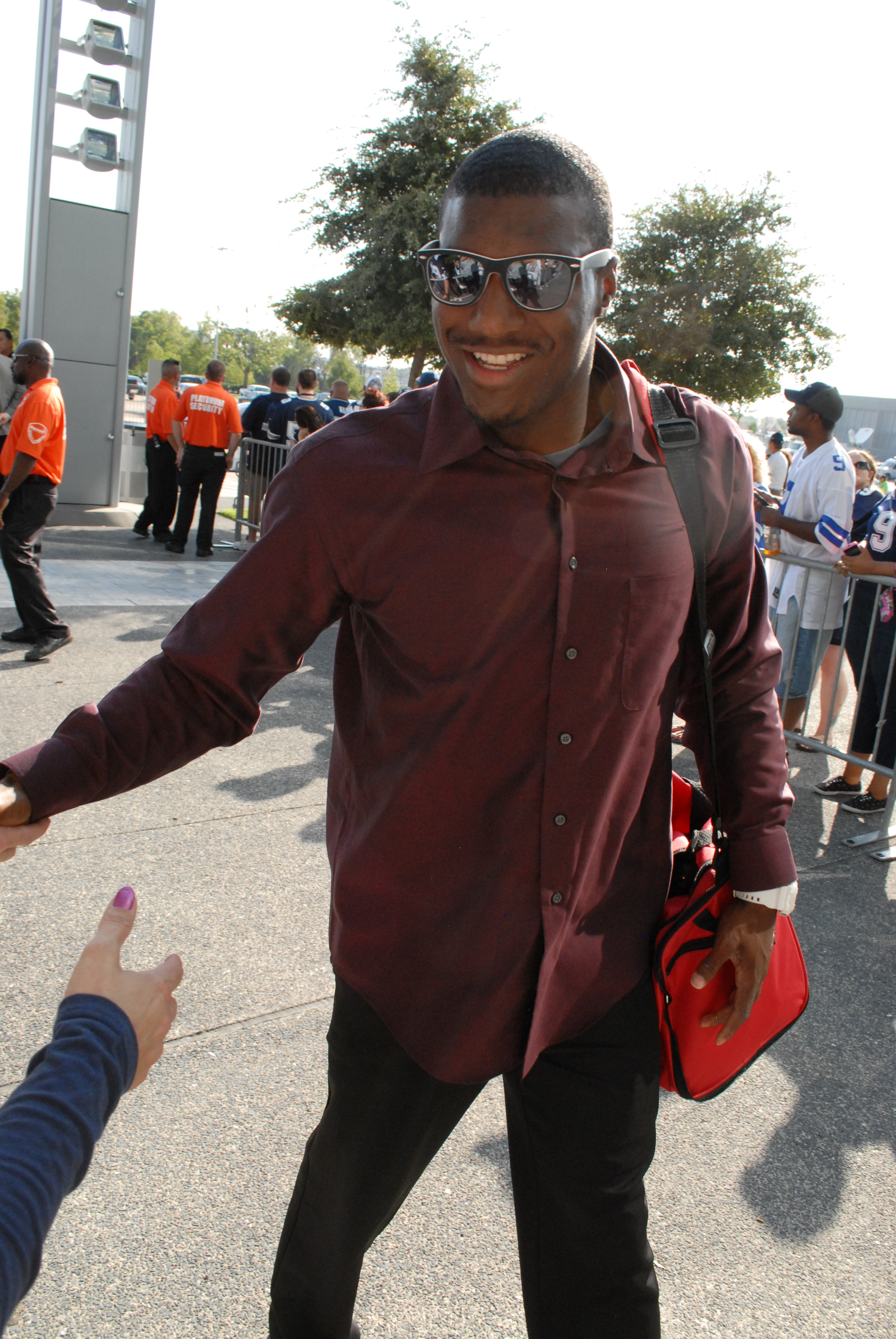
- Brown in August 2012, four months before his death.

No. 20, 53, 57
- Position: Linebacker

Personal information
- Born: October 20, 1987; St. Louis, Missouri, U.S.
- Died: December 8, 2012 (aged 25); Dallas, Texas, U.S.
- Listed height: 6 ft 4 in (1.93 m)
- Listed weight: 265 lb (120 kg)

Career information
- High school: Vashon (St. Louis)
- College: Illinois
- NFL draft: 2010: undrafted

Career history
- Jacksonville Sharks (2011); Hamilton Tiger-Cats (2011)*; San Antonio Talons (2012); Indianapolis Colts (2012); Dallas Cowboys (2012)*
- * Offseason or practice squad member only

Awards and highlights
- ArenaBowl champion (2011)

Career AFL statistics
- Total tackles: 34
- Sacks: 10
- Forced fumbles: 1
- Stats at ArenaFan.com
- Stats at Pro Football Reference

Jerry Jerome Brown Jr. (October 20, 1987 – December 8, 2012) was an American professional football linebacker who played in the National Football League (NFL). In college, he played on the defensive line for the University of Illinois. In his professional career, he was a member of the Indianapolis Colts and Dallas Cowboys of the NFL, the Hamilton Tiger-Cats of the Canadian Football League, and the Jacksonville Sharks and San Antonio Talons of the Arena Football League (AFL). He was signed as a free agent by the Sharks in 2011; in the team's ArenaBowl XXIV victory, he had one tackle assist, a forced fumble and a fumble recovery.

== Early life ==
Brown played football at Vashon High School, helping his team win three St. Louis Public High League titles and three Missouri district championships. His best year came as a senior in 2005, recording 97 tackles, 13 sacks and one interception.

During his high school career, he was a two-time Public High League Defensive MVP and a first-team All-Public High League Conference selection. As a senior, he received PrepStar All-America honors, was named to the St. Louis Post-Dispatch first-team All-Metro squad and was a Missouri Sportswriters and Sportscasters Association Class 5 first-team all-state choice. He was the 11th-ranked high school recruit in Missouri and 53rd-ranked defensive end in the nation according to Rivals.com.

== College career ==
In 2006, Brown accepted a football scholarship to University of Illinois Urbana-Champaign. He was redshirted as a freshman and by the end of the season he would go on to be named the team's defensive scout player of the year. As a sophomore, he played in 13 games and had 2.5 sacks during Illinois' run to the 2008 Rose Bowl.

As a junior in 2008, he saw action in 11 games, recording 3 tackles (1 for loss) against the University of Missouri. As a senior in 2009, he had an outstanding spring game making a game-high seven tackles and two sacks, but academic problems eventually forced him to leave school.

During his college career, he played mostly as backup defensive end, recording a total of 13 tackles (4 for loss), 2.5 sacks and two passes defensed.

== Professional career ==
=== Jacksonville Sharks ===
Brown signed with the Jacksonville Sharks of the Arena Football League (AFL) on March 3, 2011, helping the team win ArenaBowl XXIV. In the final, he posted one tackle, a forced fumble and a fumble recovery. In 13 regular season games he recorded 19.5 tackles, six sacks and three fumble recoveries.

=== Hamilton Tiger-Cats ===
At the end of the AFL season, he was signed to the practice roster of the Hamilton Tiger-Cats of the Canadian Football League on September 27, 2011.

=== San Antonio Talons ===
Brown signed with the San Antonio Talons of the AFL on November 11, 2011. He played in 11 games recording 34 tackles (5 for loss), two fumble recoveries and one blocked kick.

=== Indianapolis Colts ===
He worked out for the Houston Texans, New York Jets and the Philadelphia Eagles, before being signed as a free agent by the Indianapolis Colts on May 23, 2012 to play linebacker. He was one of the last cuts in preseason before making the team's practice squad. He appeared in one regular season game against the New York Jets, before being waived and signed once again to the practice squad. He was cut from the team on October 20, 2012.

=== Dallas Cowboys ===
On October 24, 2012, the Dallas Cowboys signed him to their practice squad, where he was making progress by being named scout team player of the week and was receiving consideration for a move to the active roster at the time of his death.

== Death ==
In the early morning of December 8, 2012, Brown was a passenger in a car driven by his Cowboys and Illinois teammate Josh Brent. About 2:21 am, Brent drove the car at high speed into an outside curb on Texas State Highway 114 outside Dallas, causing the vehicle to flip at least once and then come to rest in the middle of a service road. The car caught fire, which was extinguished. Brown was unresponsive at the scene and later pronounced dead. Brent was charged with driving under the influence and intoxication manslaughter. Police said that Brent attempted to pull Brown out of the car.

The crash occurred one day before playing against the Cincinnati Bengals, which was a game with playoff implications for both sides and that the Bengals were heavily favored to win. Head coach Jason Garrett told the team of the incident before flying to Cincinnati. That Saturday, the players held emotional meetings and hung the jerseys of Brent and Brown in their locker room.

The game would become one of the most emotional in franchise history. The defense was already going to play without five starters (Bruce Carter, Sean Lee, Barry Church, Kenyon Coleman and Jay Ratliff) and they would also end up losing Brent, who was going to start in place of Ratliff. The Cowboys stunned the Bengals with an improbable 20–19 come-from-behind victory that was decided in the closing seconds with a Dan Bailey 40-yard field goal. After the final play, Garrett embraced Jason Hatcher, who held Brown's jersey, which was originally placed on the bench during the game. In Brown's honor, the Cowboys wore a 53 decal on their uniforms, and kept his locker intact.

For the memorial service, Stacey Jackson (Brown's mother) requested Brent to meet with the family at the airport, to also ride and sit with them while at the event. The team presented Jackson with the game ball of the 20–19 win over the Cincinnati Bengals, along with a hard-hat award, which was given to players who did their job regardless of circumstance.

== See also ==
- List of gridiron football players who died during their careers
