= Josh Taylor (actor) =

American actor (born 1943)

- Born: Tommy Tim Taylor; September 25, 1943 (age 83); Princeton, Illinois, U.S.
- Occupation: Actor
- Years active: 1973–present
- Spouse(s): Sandahl Bergman (divorced); Lisa Tremblay (1999–present)
- Relatives: Ron Taylor (brother)

Josh Taylor (born September 25, 1943) is an American television actor. He is known for playing Chris Kositchek and Roman Brady on the American dramatic serial Days of Our Lives, Jack McKay on the teen drama Beverly Hills, 90210 and as Michael Hogan, the father on the situation comedy The Hogan Family.

== Early life and education ==
Born in Princeton, Illinois, as Tommy Tim Taylor and known as "Timmy", Taylor moved with his family to Chillicothe, Illinois when he was two years old. They lived in Shore acres with a swimming pool. His dad became athletic director of Chillicothe Township High School (now Illinois Valley Central High School) as well as a respected football coach, and both Josh and older brother Ron played quarterback under him. He was tutored in algebra in high school by Elizabeth Marie Starr (she a freshman, he a sophomore). Heavily recruited for his football skills, Josh chose Dartmouth College, where he was a member of two Ivy Championship teams and the Phi Delta Alpha fraternity, graduating with an A.B. degree in sociology in 1965. He then received a full scholarship to the University of Denver law school, where he earned his Juris Doctor degree in 1969. After law school, he moved to the West Coast.

== Career ==
After earning his Juris Doctor, he decided to take a year off and work on the Alaska Pipeline. On the way to Alaska he stopped in Los Angeles to visit friends and was offered a job as manager of the Westwood Village Bratskeller. He spent a year and a half at the restaurant which catered to celebrities and, surrounded by actors and producers, decided to give up a future in law to pursue acting. After the Bratskeller closed, he worked as a bartender at the Riverside Lounge in Santa Monica until he snagged his first acting role playing a contemporary cowboy on an episode of Barnaby Jones in 1976. This was quickly followed with roles on The Six Million Dollar Man and The Hardy Boys.

In 1977, he took the role of bartender Chris Kositchek on the soap opera Days of Our Lives. His notoriety heightened as he became an integral part of the fictional landscape of Salem, the setting of the soap, and this eventually led to primetime starring tryouts. In 1981, Taylor went to CBS and had his own short-lived detective series, Riker. His role on Days continued uninterrupted.

In 1985, producers Tom Miller and Bob Boyett were casting the husband role for Valerie Harper on her new NBC series Close to Home, which was retitled Valerie before its premiere. Harper's on-screen husband, Michael Hogan, was an airline pilot who was seldom around. Taylor was called in for the part, among many other actors who were willing to settle for part-time status on the show, and earned the role. Valerie premiered in March 1986 to moderate ratings but critical success and, as the series was picked up for a second season, Taylor successfully balanced his work on the sitcom with his long-running role on Days.

In 1987, behind-the-scenes events on Valerie would cause Taylor to leave Days of our Lives. Valerie Harper was fired by Lorimar-Telepictures, the series' parent studio, during that year's filming hiatus (between seasons two and three) following a contract dispute. Both her dismissal and her character's being written off as having died were controversial at the time, since the show was named after its star and lead character. Sandy Duncan was named as Harper's replacement, and Taylor felt that, to ensure the continued success of the show, he would leave Days in order expand his sitcom role. Seeing this as a foothold to a lasting role in primetime, Taylor only thought it appropriate that the Michael Hogan character would be home more often for his family, both in the wake of his wife's death and in order to help his sister (Duncan) settle into the household. The series was retitled Valerie's Family: The Hogans in September 1987, later becoming The Hogan Family (the title by which all seasons of the show became known in syndication) in June 1988.

Meanwhile, Taylor was preparing to make his last appearance as Chris Kositchek on Days. In the fall of 1987, after a ten-year run, the character had passed the bar exam and become a lawyer, serving the residents of Salem, if only for a brief period.

In 1988, Taylor starred opposite Barbara Eden in the made-for-television movie The Secret Life of Kathy McCormick, and guest-starred on series including Diagnosis: Murder, Walker: Texas Ranger, Murder, She Wrote, Matlock, and L.A. Law. The Hogan Family moved to CBS for its sixth season in 1990, but was canceled by the end of 1990–91 season. Taylor followed this with the pilot of the television version of North Dallas Forty. He played Jack McKay, Dylan's father, on Beverly Hills, 90210 on and off between 1991 and 1993, with occasional appearances in later seasons.

In 1997, he returned to Days, this time playing the character of Roman Brady. In 2004, Roman was murdered by the Salem Stalker (who turned out to be his ex-wife, Marlena) during his and Kate's wedding reception. A few months later, it was revealed that Roman didn't die but was alive on a tropical island called Melaswen (New Salem backwards). He is still appearing on the show.

== Personal life ==
Taylor is a son of George Gail Taylor and Ragnhild "Rena" (Christensen) Taylor.
