= Spider Hill =

Annual haunted event in Chillicothe, Illinois

- Spider Hill logo

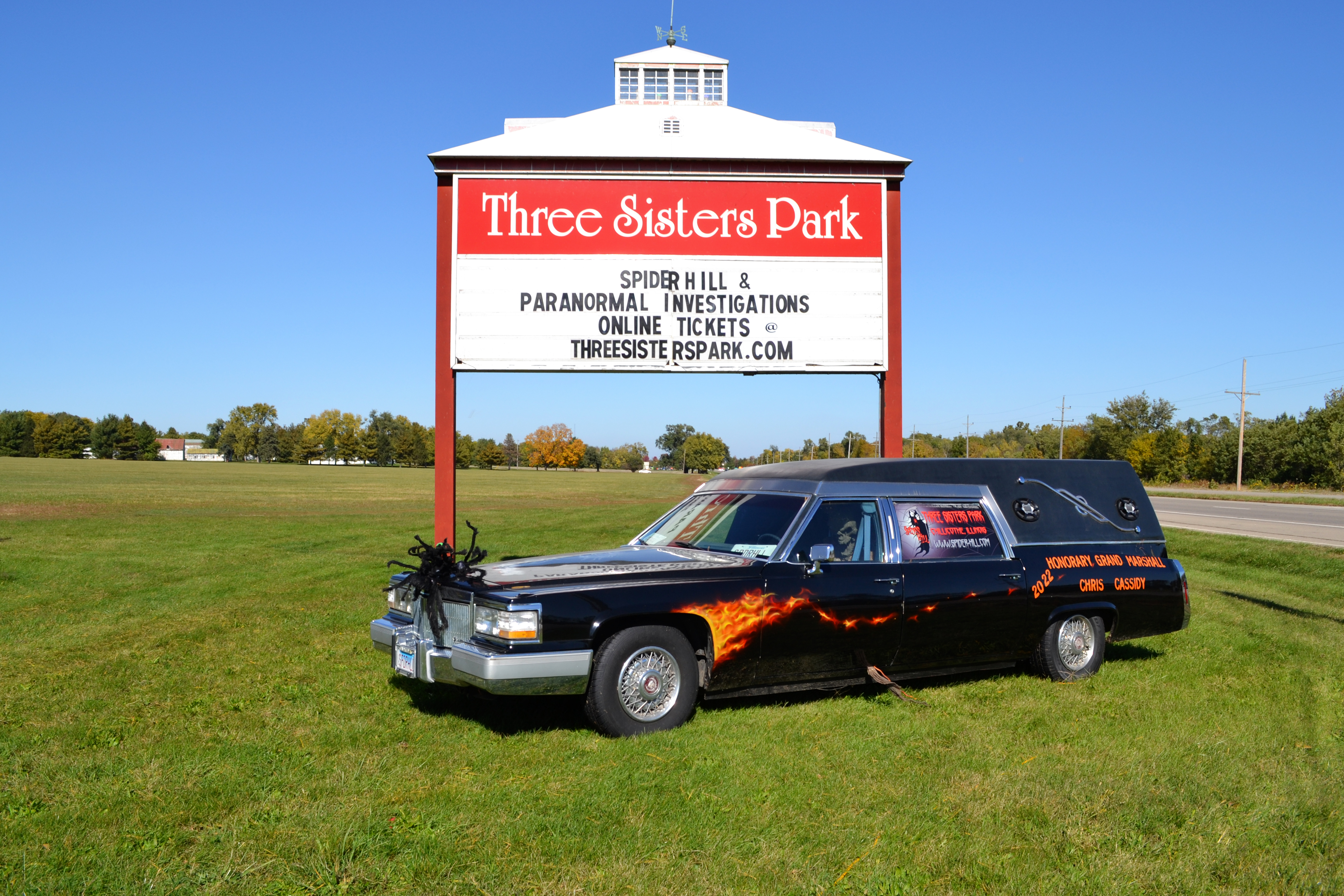
- Sign for Spider Hill at Three Sisters Park, October 2023
- Status: Active
- Frequency: Annually in October
- Venue: Three Sisters Park
- Location: 17189 State Route 29, Chillicothe, Illinois
- Coordinates: 40.533633°N 89.301313°W
- Country: USA
- Inaugurated: 1999
- Website: Official website

Spider Hill is an annual haunted event held at Three Sisters Park in Chillicothe, Illinois to celebrate Halloween. The attractions include a trail, haunted house, and a paranormal tour. It is touted by the organizers as the number one haunted attraction in Central Illinois.

== History ==
Spider Hill was launched in 1999 by the local Optimist Club and Three Sisters Park and featured three main attractions: The Massacre Mansion, The Haunted Express haunted hayride, and The Trail of Terror, which walks visitors through the forest. Attendance in the first event was 8,000. Sponsors of the event remind visitors of the legend of Spider Hill and the event's namesake where 23 individuals died at the site during World War I from venomous spider bites.

The event is run entirely by volunteers, starting with 60 in 2000, increasing to 165 in 2007, and about 100 in 2022. Volunteers participate in organized workshops to share scaring techniques. The last attendance figures released were in 2004, when 20,000 visitors went through the various attractions during the October weekends and Halloween night. Event volunteers or actors reveal the biggest screams result from encounters with terrifying clowns, causing a grown man to faint twice in 2003 and another to spit at the circus specter for scaring his girlfriend.

Spider Hill went on hiatus in 2020 due to the COVID-19 pandemic.

== Attractions ==
=== Massacre Mansion ===
Massacre Mansion is the haunted house, which encompasses about 8,000 sq ft (740 m^{2}). In 2012, the operators of Spider Hill bought a haunted house from Cedar Rapids called Nightmare Manor. Its props and scenery were used to double the size of Massacre Mansion.

=== Haunted Trail ===
The Trail of Terror is a winding path through the forest featuring scares along the way.

=== Hayride and Zombie Invasion ===
The original haunted hayride was replaced with Zombie Invasion, which is a paintball shooting experience from aboard a "war wagon". In 2022, the Zombie Invasion was put on hiatus due to costs and returned to a family-family scenic ride.

=== Paranormal investigation ===
In 2023, Spider Hill partnered with Enlightened Souls Paranormal investigation group to offer paranormal investigation of a historical building at the park. Tickets in 2023 were $45 for the paranormal investigation experience.

== Other bibliography ==
- An, Susie (26 September 2005). "Spider Hill will hold Chillicothe blood drive – Haunted attraction, Red Cross join forces". City. Peoria Journal Star. Peoria, Illinois. p. B6. Access World News. Newsbank. Accessed via Illinois Community College Library system, Illinois Central College: http://infoweb.newsbank.com.library.icc.edu/
- Burke, Brad (5 October 2001). "Haunted Parks Planners Expect Some 'Wet Pants' – Spider Hill Opens Tonight With Some New Frights". City. Peoria Journal Star. Peoria, Illinois. p. B6. Access World News. Newsbank. Accessed via Illinois Community College Library system, Illinois Central College: http://infoweb.newsbank.com.library.icc.edu/
- Burke, Brad (5 October 2006). "SCARE OR BE SCARED – Ready for a few tricks and treats? Get a Jump on Halloween With some of the area's best haunts". Cue. Peoria Journal Star. Peoria, Illinois. p. C1. Access World News. Newsbank. Accessed via Illinois Community College Library system, Illinois Central College: http://infoweb.newsbank.com.library.icc.edu/
- Green, Angela (1 October 2004). "Spooktacular Spider Hill Opens Tonight". City. Peoria Journal Star. Peoria, Illinois. p. B6. Access World News. Newsbank. Accessed via Illinois Community College Library system, Illinois Central College: http://infoweb.newsbank.com.library.icc.edu/
- Hilyard, Scott (31 October 2000). "Terrifying Secrets – Special Effects Make Spider Hill Events Truly Spooktacular". Feature. Peoria Journal Star. Peoria, Illinois. p. C10. Access World News. Newsbank. Accessed via Illinois Community College Library system, Illinois Central College: http://infoweb.newsbank.com.library.icc.edu/
