= Illinois Valley Central High School =

High school in Chillicothe, United States

Location
- 1300 West Sycamore Street; Chillicothe, Peoria County, Illinois 61523; United States; 40°54′46″N 89°30′11″W

Information
- Type: Comprehensive Public High School
- School district: Illinois Valley Central Community Unit School District 321
- Principal: Kenton Bergman
- Faculty: 47.51 (FTE)
- Grades: 9–12
- Enrollment: 647 (2022-23)
- Student to teacher ratio: 13.62
- Campus type: City
- Colors: Maroon, grey
- Athletics: IHSA
- Athletics conference: Illini Prairie Conference
- Nickname: Grey Ghosts
- Website: Illinois Valley Central High School

Illinois Valley Central High School (also known as Chillicothe IVC, IVCHS, or simply IVC) is a public four-year high school located at 1300 West Sycamore Street in Chillicothe, Illinois, a city in Peoria County, Illinois, in the Midwestern United States. IVCHS serves the communities of Chillicothe, Dunlap (small portion), Edelstein, Mossville, Peoria (small portion), and Rome. The campus is located 15 miles northeast of Peoria, Illinois, and serves a mixed city, village, and rural residential community.

== Athletics ==
Illinois Valley Central High School competes in the Illini Prairie Conference and is a member school in the Illinois High School Association. In the 2017–2018 school year, IVCHS joined the new Illini Prairie Conference following the merger of the Corn Belt Conference and Okaw Valley Conference.

In the IHSA, IVC has appeared in the IHSA Final Four on five occasions, most recently in 2022. IVC's first appearance in the IHSA Final Four was in the 2006 Class A Boys Basketball State Championship where the Ghosts fell to Seneca HS 44–47. Later that year in May, IVC arrived back at the state finals this time playing for the Class A state title in boys baseball. This time IVC top Trenton (Wesclin) 8–3 for IVC's first and only state title to date. IVC returned to the Final Four in 2008 for the Class 2A Boys Baseball state championship where IVC fell to Olympia finishing 2nd. IVC's next appearance in the IHSA Final Four was in Boys Baseball; however, IVC fell to Harrisburg 7–1 in the semifinal before finishing third against Elmhurst (IC Catholic) 6–4. In November 2022, IVC made the Class 2A girls volleyball state finals for the first time in program history. The Ghosts took third place, beating Freeburg, 25–16, 25–15, finishing 36–4.

IVCHS co-ops with nearby Dunlap High School for some athletics (boys' and girls' swimming and diving).

== Mascot ==
Their mascot is the Grey Ghosts, with school colors of maroon and grey. Different theories exist regarding the origin of the mascot name, which up until 1940 was the Maroons. The Grey Ghost was inducted into the ESPN nickname hall of fame in 1987.

== Activities ==
IVC has a wide range of activities to offer including a large fine arts department. IVC's music department offers marching band, a concert band, a wind ensemble, and two jazz bands. The music department also offers different levels of choral music including Chorale and various ensembles.

The IVC Marching Grey Ghosts have accumulated 15 state titles since 1990, most recently in 2019 at the State of Illinois Marching Invitational. The Marching Grey Ghosts have participated in numerous national performances including the Fiesta Bowl Parade, the Citrus Bowl Parade, and the 2007 National Memorial Day Parade.

Over the years IVC has offered foreign language courses in Spanish, French, & German. Most notably, IVC has hosted a biannual GAPP exchange program with Max von Laue Gymnasium in Koblenz, Germany since 1980.

== History ==
Illinois Valley Central High School was formed out of the consolidation of Chillicothe High School in 1969. The name Illinois Valley Central was chosen after a naming contest was held shortly after the consolidation. The winning entry was submitted by Marianne Schaffner, a former resident of Chillicothe. Chillicothe High School was housed in what is now the elementary and junior high school on Truitt Ave. The renamed Illinois Valley Central was at this location from Fall Semester 1969 until Spring Semester 1976. The students moved to the current location in Fall 1976, when a new school building was constructed at the corner of Bradley Ave. and Sycamore St. in Chillicothe.

== Notable alumni ==
- Brian Garrison, Partner at Faegre Drinker a full-service international law firm and one of the 100 largest law firms in the United States.
- David Batstone, theologian, writer and ethics professor
- David Julazadeh, U.S. Air Force general
- Lance LeGault, film and television actor
- Zach McAllister, Major League Baseball player
- Johnston McCulley, writer and creator of the character Zorro
- William Owens, U.S. Navy SEAL
- Josh Taylor, television actor
- Ron Taylor, football player and coach
