= University High School (Normal, Illinois) =

Coordinates: 40°30′55.8″N 88°59′46.2″W

- 601 West Gregory Street; Normal, Illinois 61790; United States

Information
- Type: Laboratory school
- Motto: An exemplary high school... A model teacher education center.
- Established: 1857
- Principal: Andrea Markert
- Faculty: 92
- Grades: 9–12
- Enrollment: 611 (2016-2017)
- Colors: Kelly green Gold
- Athletics conference: Central State Eight
- Team name: Pioneers
- Rival: CCHS (Note: The schools are currently in different conferences and do not play each other.)
- Publication: Brome and Beyond
- Newspaper: Clarionette
- Yearbook: Clarion
- Website: uhigh.ilstu.edu

University High School (U-High), located in Normal, Illinois, United States, is one of two laboratory schools of the College of Education at Illinois State University designed for research and teacher-training; the other is Thomas Metcalf School, an elementary school. Founded in 1857, it is the oldest laboratory school and among the oldest high schools in the United States. The principal is Andrea Markert, who was hired in April 2013 after having served as interim principal for the 2012–2013 school year and as assistant principal from 2010 to 2012. Athletic teams are known as the Pioneers and the school colors are kelly green and gold.

== Student enrollment ==
The state of Illinois caps the Illinois State University laboratory school enrollment at 1,000. U-High enrolls approximately 600 students (excluding hearing and visually impaired students) while Metcalf enrolls about 400. Neither school accepts students with learning disabilities that have IEP minutes. The IHSA institutes an enrollment multiplier for schools such as U-High that are unboundaried, thus classifying it as a larger school in athletic competitions in certain sports such as football.

== Demographics ==
According to the Illinois State Board of Education's Illinois Report Card, in 2021 74.4% of the student body was Caucasian, 4.9% was Black, 6.9% was Hispanic, 7.9% was Asian, 0.2% was Indigenous, 0.2% was Pacific Islander, and 5.6% was two or more races. 46.6% was male and 53.4% was female. 2.1% are low-income, and 0.5% were disabled.

== Athletics and extracurriculars ==
The boys' golf team won the IHSA state championship 7 years in a row, ending in 2019 when they fell to the Irish of Peoria Notre Dame; the girls' golf team has won it 4 years in a row. U-High is also known for its basketball program which was home to coach Cal Hubbard. The swimming, boys' tennis, cross country, cheerleading, wrestling, football, and soccer teams along with many others are also highly competitive in the IHSA. The U-High girls' basketball team has had at least 20 wins in the past 4 seasons and since 1992 have 13 Regional Titles, 7 Sectional Titles with a 3rd and a 4th-place finish. The U-High girls' soccer team won 5 straight Regional Titles from 2007- 2011 and in 2010 won their first Sectional Championship in the past 7 years. In the 2010 season, the men's swim team took third place. In 2014 the men's swim won the IHSA state title. The men's cross country team has brought home trophies for three consecutive years (2009-2011) placing 2nd, 3rd, and 3rd respectively at the IHSA State Meet. Also in 2012 the woman's cross country team took 2nd at the IHSA state meet. The men's and women's cross country teams have both been Cornbelt Conference Champions from (2009- 2016). In 2012, the men's basketball team went to state and placed second, the boys' baseball team earned a class 2A state championship, and the girls' soccer team earned a 4th-place finish at state. In addition, in 2016, both boys soccer and golf teams won state championships. In 2017, the boys track team won the 2A state championship.

The Speech Team from 2009 to 2012 has captured both the Regional and Sectional Championships and had 3rd and 4th-place finishers at Nationals in 2008 and 2011 respectively. Additionally, the Speech Team won the IHSA State Finals Championship in 2013. The math team received 7th place in 2007 and 9th place in 2008 for class 2A. In 2008 Chess scored 5–2 to win first in their class with a fourth round win against number 1 seed Niles North. In 2009 the chess team went 6–1 to earn 6th place in the Illinois High School Association chess tournament. U-High's WYSE team has qualified for the state competition for 20+ years in a row. The WYSE team has won 4 state titles (1998, 2013, 2014, 2016).

== Notable alumni ==
- Keita Bates-Diop, NBA Player
- Arnold Orville Beckman, inventor of the pH meter
- Ellen Crawford, actress most commonly known for her part on the TV series ER
- Jim Crews, college basketball coach
- Chase Hilgenbrinck, retired professional soccer player in the Chilean Primera División and Major League Soccer, Catholic priest in the Roman Catholic Diocese of Peoria
- Derek Johnson (baseball), pitching coach Milwaukee Brewers
- Pokey LaFarge, musician and songwriter
- Ogonna Nnamani, two-time US indoor volleyball Olympian and winner of the Silver Medal
- Emily Riehl, mathematician
- Steve Sample, Sr., jazz educator and composer
- Adlai Stevenson II, Democratic Party presidential candidate in 1952 and 1956, Governor of Illinois (1949-1953)
