= Chillicothe, Illinois =

Chillicothe
- City
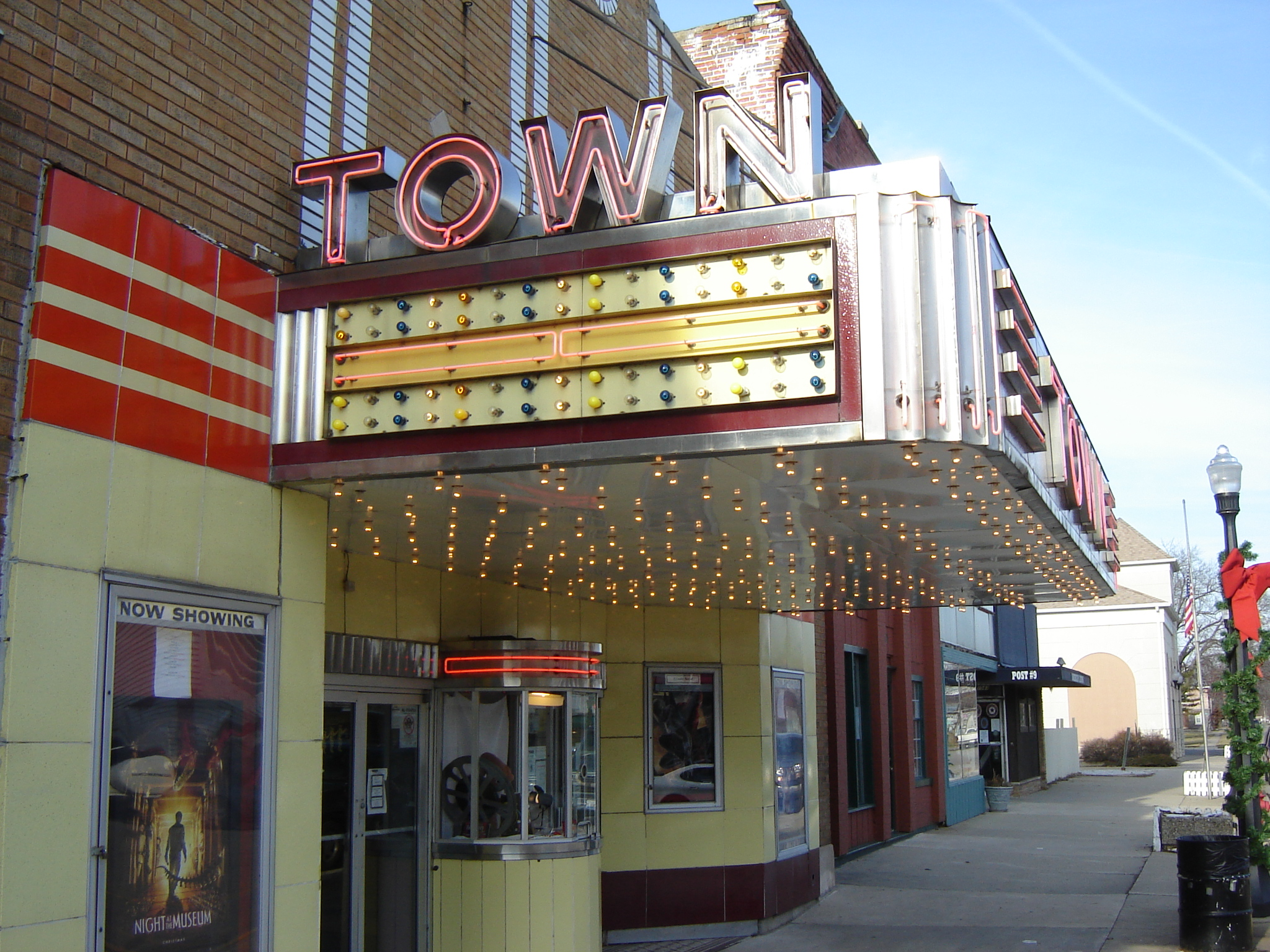
- Art deco movie theater on North 2nd Street

- Location of Chillicothe in Peoria County, Illinois.
- Coordinates: 40°55′05″N 89°29′44″W
- Country: United States
- State: Illinois
- County: Peoria
- Platted: 1834
- Founder: Erastus C. Root and Samuel T. McKean

Government
  - Mayor: Michael Hughes

Area
  - Total: 5.54 sq mi (14.34 km^{2})
  - Land: 5.27 sq mi (13.66 km^{2})
  - Water: 0.26 sq mi (0.68 km^{2})
- Elevation: 528 ft (161 m)

Population (2020)
  - Total: 6,128
  - Estimate (2024): 6,052
  - Density: 1,161.9/sq mi (448.62/km^{2})
- Time zone: UTC-6 (CST)
  - Summer (DST): UTC-5 (CDT)
- ZIP code: 61523
- Area code: 309
- FIPS code: 17-14117
- GNIS feature ID: 2393515
- Website: www.cityofchillicotheil.org

Chillicothe (/ˌtʃɪlɪˈkɔːθi/) is a town on the Illinois River in Peoria County, Illinois, United States. As of the 2020 census, Chillicothe had a population of 6,128. Chillicothe is just north of the city of Peoria and is part of the Peoria Metropolitan Statistical Area.

== History ==
The name Chillicothe comes from the name of the Chalahgawtha sect of the Shawnee nation.

Along with Peoria, Chillicothe grew due to river traffic and quickly became a stop for barge and railroad traffic traveling to and from Chicago and St. Louis.

In the late 1800s, the Atchison, Topeka and Santa Fe Railway was building its mainline from Chicago to Kansas City and selected Chillicothe as its crossing point of the Illinois River. The railroad quickly became an establishment in Chillicothe as a crew change point and a notable stop in Central Illinois. Chillicothe today still remains a key point on the Southern Transcon route between Chicago and Los Angeles with high frequency intermodal freight trains moving through daily.

On November 5, 1988, Vice President George H.W. Bush, Representative Robert H. Michel, & Governor James Thompson stopped in Chillicothe to close out Election '88 in Illinois. Governor Thompson declared the day "Ilion Crabel Day" in honor of the city's record breaking city clerk. Crabel, elected in 1923, served as city clerk for 66 years until 1989.

Chillicothe is the host to The Summer Camp Music Festival, a multi-day music festival created by Jay Goldberg Events & Entertainment that is held annually at Three Sisters Park.

== Geography ==
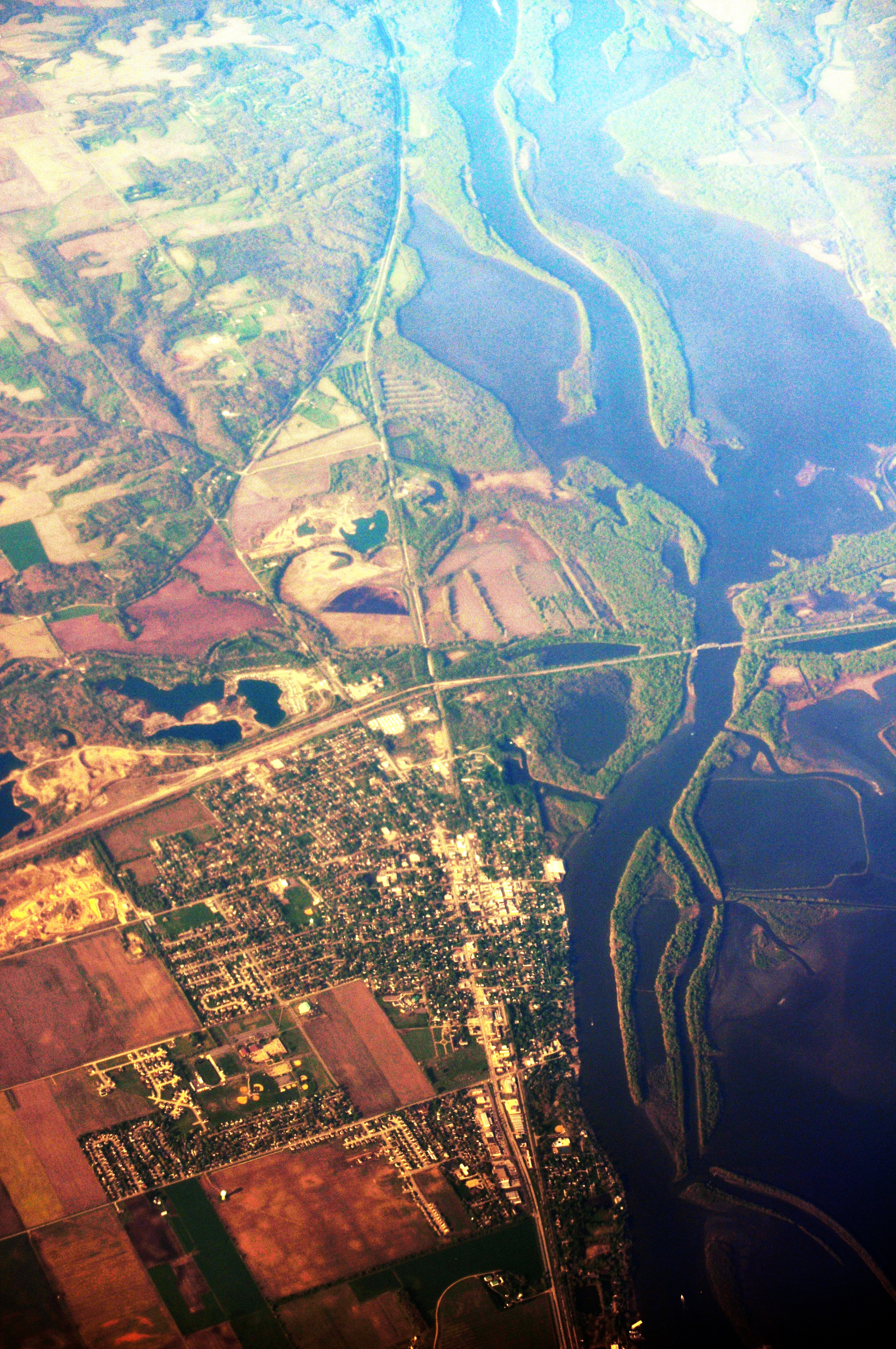
Aerial view of Chillicothe, 2012

According to the 2010 census, Chillicothe has a total area of 5.415 square miles (14.02 km^{2}), of which 5.13 square miles (13.29 km^{2}) (or 94.74%) is land and 0.285 square miles (0.74 km^{2}) (or 5.26%) is water.

Chillicothe is located on the Illinois River and on the parallel Iowa Interstate Railroad (IAIS) branch, from Bureau to Peoria, which was formerly the Rock Island Railroad. Crossing the IAIS and the Illinois River at Chillicothe is the former Santa Fe Railroad, now owned by BNSF Railway. Almost 4 miles outside of town the BNSF Railway operates one of the most notable civil engineering points on the Chillicothe Subdivision. Edelstein Hill is one of the steepest climbs on the railway system and attracts many railfans to see locomotives pulling intermodal trains up the hill.

The Illinois River runs both north and south connecting Chicago with St. Louis. Barge traffic is occasional as it is an efficient means of transportation for some bulk products. Eight miles to the north is Sparland and three miles to the south is Rome. Peoria is 20 miles to the south.

== Demographics ==
Historical population
Census	Pop.	Note	%±
1860	663		—
1880	936		—
1890	1,632		74.4%
1900	1,699		4.1%
1910	1,851		8.9%
1920	1,986		7.3%
1930	1,978		−0.4%
1940	2,303		16.4%
1950	2,767		20.1%
1960	3,054		10.4%
1970	6,052		98.2%
1980	6,176		2.0%
1990	5,959		−3.5%
2000	5,996		0.6%
2010	6,097		1.7%
2020	6,128		0.5%
U.S. Decennial Census

=== Racial and ethnic composition ===
Chillicothe city, Illinois – Racial and ethnic composition Note: the US Census treats Hispanic/Latino as an ethnic category. This table excludes Latinos from the racial categories and assigns them to a separate category. Hispanics/Latinos may be of any race.
Race / Ethnicity (NH = Non-Hispanic)	Pop 2000	Pop 2010	Pop 2020	% 2000	% 2010	% 2020
White alone (NH)	5,706	5,755	5,489	95.16%	94.39%	89.57%
Black or African American alone (NH)	13	15	31	0.22%	0.25%	0.51%
Native American or Alaska Native alone (NH)	10	10	5	0.17%	0.16%	0.08%
Asian alone (NH)	9	17	12	0.15%	0.28%	0.20%
Native Hawaiian or Pacific Islander alone (NH)	1	5	2	0.02%	0.08%	0.03%
Other race alone (NH)	3	2	23	0.05%	0.03%	0.38%
Mixed race or Multiracial (NH)	44	42	276	0.73%	0.69%	4.50%
Hispanic or Latino (any race)	210	251	290	3.50%	4.12%	4.73%
Total	5,996	6,097	6,128	100.00%	100.00%	100.00%

=== 2020 census ===
As of the 2020 census, Chillicothe had a population of 6,128. The median age was 41.6 years. 22.9% of residents were under the age of 18 and 21.4% of residents were 65 years of age or older. For every 100 females there were 94.0 males, and for every 100 females age 18 and over there were 88.8 males age 18 and over.

93.5% of residents lived in urban areas, while 6.5% lived in rural areas.

There were 2,589 households in Chillicothe, of which 28.1% had children under the age of 18 living in them. Of all households, 45.5% were married-couple households, 18.1% were households with a male householder and no spouse or partner present, and 28.5% were households with a female householder and no spouse or partner present. About 32.7% of all households were made up of individuals and 15.5% had someone living alone who was 65 years of age or older.

There were 2,827 housing units, of which 8.4% were vacant. The homeowner vacancy rate was 2.5% and the rental vacancy rate was 11.8%.

Racial composition as of the 2020 census
Race	Number	Percent
White	5,591	91.2%
Black or African American	31	0.5%
American Indian and Alaska Native	9	0.1%
Asian	12	0.2%
Native Hawaiian and Other Pacific Islander	2	0.0%
Some other race	85	1.4%
Two or more races	398	6.5%
Hispanic or Latino (of any race)	290	4.7%

=== 2000 census ===
As of the 2000 census, there were 5,996 people, 2,429 households, and 1,649 families residing in the city. The population density was 1,213.8 inhabitants per square mile (468.7/km^{2}). There were 2,544 housing units at an average density of 515.0 per square mile (198.8/km^{2}). The racial makeup of the town was 97.4% White, 0.2% African American, 0.2% Native American, 0.2% Asian, <0.1% Pacific Islander, 1.1% from other races, and 0.9% from two or more races. Hispanic or Latino of any race were 3.5% of the population.

There were 2,429 households, out of which 31.0% had children under the age of 18 living with them, 54.5% were married couples living together, 10.1% had a female householder with no husband present, and 32.1% were non-families. 28.0% of all households were made up of individuals, and 13.0% had someone living alone who was 65 years of age or older. The average household size was 2.42 and the average family size was 2.96.

In the town, the population was spread out, with 24.7% under the age of 18, 8.1% from 18 to 24, 27.2% from 25 to 44, 22.6% from 45 to 64, and 17.4% who were 65 years of age or older. The median age was 38 years. For every 100 females, there were 89.6 males. For every 100 females age 18 and over, there were 85.9 males.

The median income for a household in the town was $40,697, and the median income for a family was $50,981. Males had a median income of $42,430 versus $23,295 for females. The per capita income for the city was $22,118. About 5.1% of families and 6.2% of the population were below the poverty line, including 5.5% of those under age 18 and 4.0% of those age 65 or over.

== Education ==
Chillicothe is served by the Illinois Valley Central Unit School District 321.

Chillicothe is the primary area served by the school district along with the neighboring towns of Rome, Mossville, Edelstein, and a part of the area near Dunlap.

Within the school district, there are three primary schools and two junior highs. South School serves the northern half of the school district (Grades PK-3). Chillicothe Junior High (CJH) serves the northern half of the school district (Grades 4–8) in Chillicothe proper while Mossville Junior High (Grades K-8) serves the southern part of the school district. In the Illinois Elementary School Association (IESA) both schools have made themselves known in multiple sports.

Illinois Valley Central High School (IVC) serves Chillicothe and is the home to the Grey Ghosts. IVCHS like its junior highs has made themselves known in the state in various activities. Most notably, the IVC Marching Grey Ghosts have accumulated 15 state titles since 1990, most recently in 2019. In the IHSA, IVC were 2006 Class A Baseball State Champions, 2006 Boys' Basketball Class A State Runners-up, 2006 Class A Scholastic Bowl State Runner-ups, 2008 Class AA Baseball State Runners-up, and most recently placed Third for Class AA Baseball in 2010.

Two private schools serve the Chillicothe area. Calvary Baptist Academy is a small, PK-12 school sponsored by Calvary Baptist Church. St. Edward's is a PK-8 Catholic School sponsored by St. Edward Parish. In 2016, St. Edward was featured in regional news outlets for the "Miracle in Chillicothe" fundraising campaign that collected over $500,000 in one week to complete emergency repairs to the building roof.

== Transportation ==
Illinois Route 29 runs through Chillicothe north to south and is a strong artery running between I-180 in the north and Peoria to the south.

Since its creation the railroad has connected Chillicothe to the outside world. The Rock Island Railroad (now Iowa Interstate Railroad) serves Chillicothe paralleling the Illinois River. The Rock Island Rockets used to serve Chillicothe connecting Peoria & Chicago. As automobiles became more popular, the service was infrequently used. The last revenue service by the Peoria Rocket was on December 31, 1978.

Chillicothe was once a stop on the Santa Fe's Super Chief (Chicago to Los Angeles) & Texas Chief (Lone Star) (Chicago to Houston) on the section of the run between Chicago and Galesburg. It was also a stop on the Super Chief's successor, the Southwest Limited/Southwest Chief. In 1996, however, following the merger of the Burlington Northern and the Santa Fe railroads to form the BNSF, and a connection put in between the Burlington Northern line from Chicago and the Santa Fe's Chillicothe Subdivision at Cameron, Illinois, the Chief was rerouted to Galesburg over the BNSF's Mendota Subdivision (also used by the California Zephyr) through Naperville, Princeton, and Mendota. The last revenue passenger service was on July 31, 1996.

Unlike its neighbors, Chillicothe's crossing of the Illinois River throughout its history has primarily been via the railroad. At one time there was briefly a ferry service connecting residents of rural Woodford County during the 1920s. However, any serious proposal to build a road crossing has never gained traction.

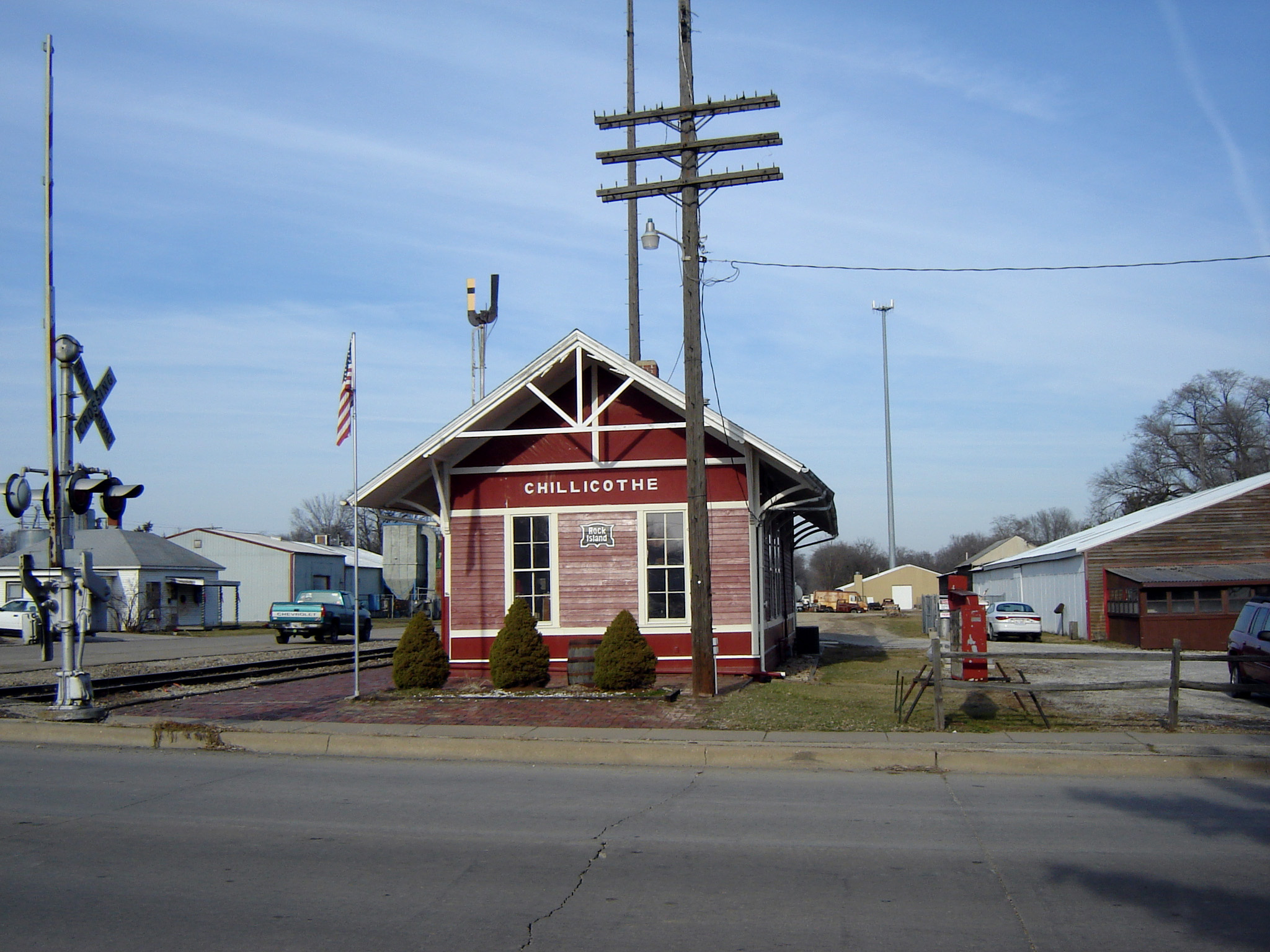
Rock Island Line Railroad Museum

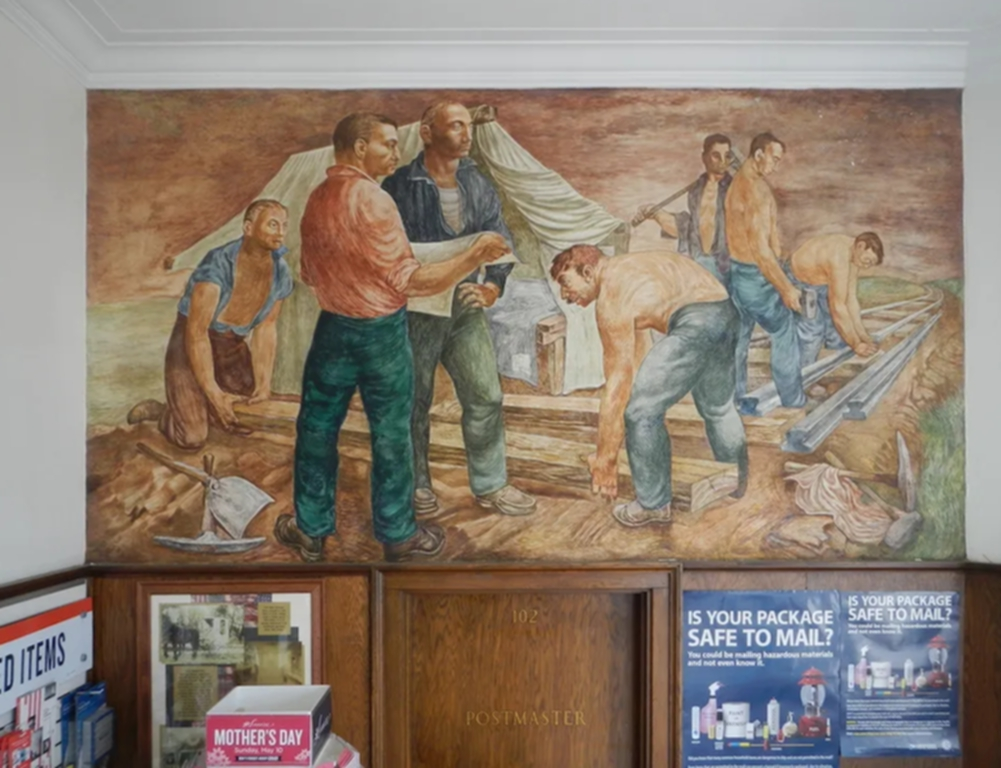
"Rail Roading" by Arthur Herschel Lidov

== Places of interest ==
- Chillicothe Post Office, WPA mural "Rail Roading" by Arthur Herschel Lidov is on display.
- The former Santa Fe Railroad station in the city, and Edelstein Hill near the city, are popular train watching locations.
- The Chillicothe Historical Society Railroad Museum is located at Cedar and 3rd Streets in the old Rock Island depot.
- Chillicothe Historical Society Fourth St. Museum, 723 N. 4th St., features eight rooms of historic artifacts.
- Shore Acres Park, riverside park with 19th-century clubhouse formerly known as the Peoria Automobile Club.
- Three Sisters Park is an agricultural park that hosts Spider Hill and Summer Camp Music Festival.
- Town Theater, an art deco movie theater on N. 2nd St., is still in business showing films.

== Notable people ==
- Bill Krieg, Major League Baseball player
- Lance (Henry) LeGault, TV and movie actor: Colonel Roderick Decker on The A-Team
- Gene Maddox, Iowa state legislator and lawyer, was born in Chillicothe.
- Zach McAllister, Major League Baseball player, currently a pitcher in the New York Yankees organization
- Johnston McCulley, pulp author: created the Zorro stories upon which all later Zorro movies and books were based
- William Owens, decorated Navy SEAL
- Josh Taylor, TV actor: Roman Brady on the soap opera Days of Our Lives and Michael Hogan on The Hogan Family.
