= Metters =

Metters is a surname. Notable people with the surname include:

- Alfred Metters (c. 1863–1918), Australian Baptist minister and chaplain during WWI
- Chris Metters (born 1990), English professional cricketer
- Colin Metters, English conductor, orchestral trainer and conducting pedagogue
- Frederick Metters (1858–1937), Australian ironworker and businessman

== See also ==
- Metters Building, building in Sydney
- Metters Limited, Australian manufacturing business founded by Frederick Metters
