= Craig and Seeley =

Australian home appliance company

Craig and Seeley Limited
- Type: Public company
- Industry: Household appliance manufacturing
- Founded: 1952 in Adelaide
- Founder: Howard Seeley AM
- Defunct: November 2001
- Fate: Subsidiary
- Successors: Vulcan; Email Limited; Electrolux
- Headquarters: Melbourne, Victoria, Australia
- Area served: Australia
- Key people: Howard Seeley
- Products: Gas and electric cooktops
- Brands: Chef

Craig and Seeley Limited is a former Australian home appliance manufacturer, that was based in Melbourne, in Victoria, Australia. Established in the 1950s, the company flourished during the post-war years when the popular Chef brand appliances became a household name. The company operated as a subsidiary of Vulcan Industries in the early 1970s, and then Email Limited, before it collapsed in November 2001. The appliance brands of Email were acquired by the Swedish-multinational Electrolux group, including the Chef brand.

The Craig and Seeley offices and showroom were located at 35 Hope Street, Brunswick, an inner northern suburb of Melbourne. Completed in 1962, the building was added to the Victorian Heritage Register on 17 April 2003 in recognition of its architectural, aesthetic and historical significance.

== Company history ==
In 1952, Howard Seeley AM (1930–2017) formed Craig and Seeley as a partnership in Adelaide, and the business was incorporated as a public company the following year. The main business was the manufacture of pre-cast fire-place surrounds and the installation of heating appliances. From 1956 the company represented E.S. & F. Ferrier in South Australia which manufactured Chef cookers at its Lux Foundry in Hope Street, Brunswick. Craig and Seeley expanded its operations and became the South Australian distributors for other appliance manufacturers including Chrysler Airtemp air conditioning units and Pyrox Limited.

Since 1958, the company’s policy had been to design appliances (mostly evaporative coolers and slow combustion heaters) and have them made by outside manufacturers under contract. In May 1962, the Lux Foundry, which had been making cookers for E.S. & F. Ferrier became available and Craig and Seeley acquired its assets, trademarks and goodwill, and started manufacturing and marketing Chef gas cookers, Lux slow combustion cookers, and its own Crestair slow combustion space heater.

Chef cooker sales increased swiftly and the Craig and Seeley company expanded rapidly. The Chef brand became a household name and the company manufactured a range of other products including Gasglo space heaters and central heaters, laundry driers, gas lamps and, at one point, the company was the largest barbecue manufacturer in Australia. At its peak, the Brunswick factory was producing approximately 2,000 Chef cookers per day.

Taken over by Vulcan Industries in 1972, then Email, its appliance brands were acquired by Electrolux. Liquidators voluntarily wound-up various corporate entities in 1985, and the holding company, no longer trading, was deregistered by the Australian Securities and Investments Commission in 2018.

== Heritage-listed building ==
Craig and Seeley Offices and Showroom
- Location within Melbourne

General information
- Status: Completed
- Type: Administration office; Retail showroom
- Architectural style: Modernist
- Location: 35 Hope Street, Brunswick, Melbourne, Victoria, Australia
- Coordinates: 37°45′50″S 144°57′33″E
- Completed: 1962; 64 years ago
- Inaugurated: 4 July 1963
- Cost: A£80,000

Technical details
- Material: Steel; enamelled metal tiles; glass
- Floor area: 1,041 m^{2} (11,200 sq ft)

Design and construction
- Architect: Theodore Berman

Victorian Heritage Register
- Official name: Craig & Seeley Offices and Showroom
- Type: Registered place
- Designated: 17 April 2003
- Reference no.: H2026
- Heritage overlay no.: HO244
- Category: Manufacturing and Processing

=== History ===
The gas industry first occupied the site in Hope Street, Brunswick, from 1891 when the Brunswick Gas and Coke Company established a gasworks. From 1906 to the late 1950s it was occupied by the Lux Foundry, operated by Sir Robert Gibson, located at 21 Hope Street, which used the surviving gas retort house as its principal building for the manufacture of cast iron stoves. Craig and Seeley began manufacturing their Chef brand cookers on the 21 Hope Street site in the early 1960s.

On an adjacent site, at 35 Hope Street, Craig and Seeley built their new headquarters and showroom. Designed in 1962 by Melbourne architect Theodore Berman, the building projected a Modernist image for a newly-established company on a site long associated with the gas industry and stove manufacturing. On 4 July 1963, Henry Bolte, the Premier of Victoria, officially opened the company's A£80,000 administrative headquarters which covered 1,041 square metres (11,200 sq ft) adjoining the foundry and factory.

=== Description ===
The offices feature the company's own factory-made porcelain enamel panels on the Hope and Percy Street facades in a striking display of diamond-pointed rustication. Green panels resembling shallow pyramidal forms stud the wall surface in a pattern that wraps around the corner of the building. A large signboard of red enamel panels is incorporated into the architecture replicating the company's logo, a white Chef running with a steaming dish. The volumetric background of green, the complementary colour of red, highlights the sign to eye-catching advantage, projecting the brand image towards the spectator.

As the former headquarters of Australia's largest cooking appliance manufacturer, the building is associated with the great surge of manufacturing in the post war years and the redevelopment and immigration programmes that sustained this activity. The offices are of historical interest for their association with the gas industry. The site has a long history of association with the industry, first as a gasworks where gas was manufactured, then as a foundry where cast iron stoves were made and more recently as a modern plant for manufacturing gas appliances. The modern offices stand in juxtaposition with the surviving nineteenth century retort house, the two buildings providing a narrative of our changing use of gas and its associated technologies.

The site was subsequently leased as commercial office space.

== See also ==
- Architecture of Melbourne
- List of places on the Victorian Heritage Register in the City of Merri-bek
- Seeley International — manufacturer of air-conditioners and gas heaters, founded by other Seeley brothers
