= List of South Australian manufacturing businesses =

A list of manufacturing companies founded in South Australia, many now forgotten but "household names" in their day. It does not include local affiliates of multinational companies, such as General Motors Holden, Kelvinator and Philips Electrical Industries. Nor does it (yet) include food and beverage companies such as AMSCOL, Chapmans, Coopers, Glen Ewin and Haighs or pharmaceuticals and toiletries such as Bickfords, Cromptons and Fauldings.

Business Name	Founded	Ceased	Founder/s	Factory address	SA-manufactured products	Notes
Actil	1941			Actil Ave., Woodville	cotton fabric bed sheets	for Australian Cotton Textile Industries Ltd.
Bagshaw Ltd.			John Stokes Bagshaw		farm machinery, inc. Ridley's "stripper"	
Castalloy	1948			76 Mooringe Ave., North Plympton	aluminium alloy castings pressure cookers alloy wheels	
Clipsal	1920		Alfred Gerard		electrical conduit fittings mains plugs and sockets switchgear	
Coldstream	1926		David Garvie	82–86 Mary St., Unley	refrigerators	
Dobbie Dico	1862		A. W. Dobbie	Sultram Place, Adelaide	brass castings water meters	
Entech Group	1986			7 Marlow Road, Keswick	PCB's, membrane keypads, electronic products	
Griffin Press	1858				contract printers	subsidiary of Advertiser Ltd.
Hills Industries	1948		Lance Hill	South Rd., Edwardstown	Hills hoists TV antennae	
Horwood Bagshaw			Joel Horwood		farm machinery	
Humes			Walter Hume		concrete pipes	
James Martin & Co			James Martin		farm machinery railway engines	
K.B.C.	c. 1947?		Kenneth Bowes	17 Woodlands Tce., Edwardstown	die-cast parts for auto makers hand-operated clothes wringer pistol drills (240VAC and 32VDC models) domestic food mixers	for Kenneth Bowes Co.
Lightburn & Co			Albert Henry Lightburn		washing machines hydraulic jacks concrete mixers Zeta cars	
May Brothers and Company			Alfred May (John) Frederick May		mining machinery farm machinery	
Metters	1895?		Frederick Metters	7–25 Manchester St., Mile End South	windpumps wood stoves gas stoves bakers' ovens	
Minelab					metal detectors	
Perry Engineering	1899	1969	Samuel Perry		railway engines	
Pope Products	1935		Barton Pope	13–23 Pope St., Beverley	garden sprinklers washing machines electric motors	
Rossi Boots	1910		Arthur Edward Rossiter	Dunn's Lane, Unley now Churchill Road, Kilburn	boots and shoes	for Rossiters Ltd.
Sabco	1892			Betting St., Albert Park	brooms and brushes	for South Australian Brush Co.
Scott Bonnar & Co	1920		Scott Bonnar; Malcolm Cornelius Bonnar	Holland Street, Thebarton	brass castings electric lawnmowers hand mowers	
Simpson	1853		Alfred Simpson	41–49 Pirie St., Adelaide (later) Simpson Ave., Dudley Park	tinware wood stoves gas stoves fireproof safes washing machines	
Sola Optical					spectacle lenses	
Solver Paints	1931		W. P. Crowhurst	95–97 Gouger St., Adelaide	house paints	
Sportco				837 South Road, St. Marys	.22 rifles	for Sporting Arms Ltd.
Wakefield Press	1942				books, esp. academic and SA history	
Wallis Refrigeration	1935		Hughie McKenzie Wallis	136 South Rd., Richmond	kerosine refrigerators electric refrigerators	
Mistral Appliances	1968				airfryers kitchen appliances cooling systems	
Gerard Lighting			Simon Gerard		lighting appliances	
