= Streibich Blacksmith Shop =

- U.S. National Register of Historic Places
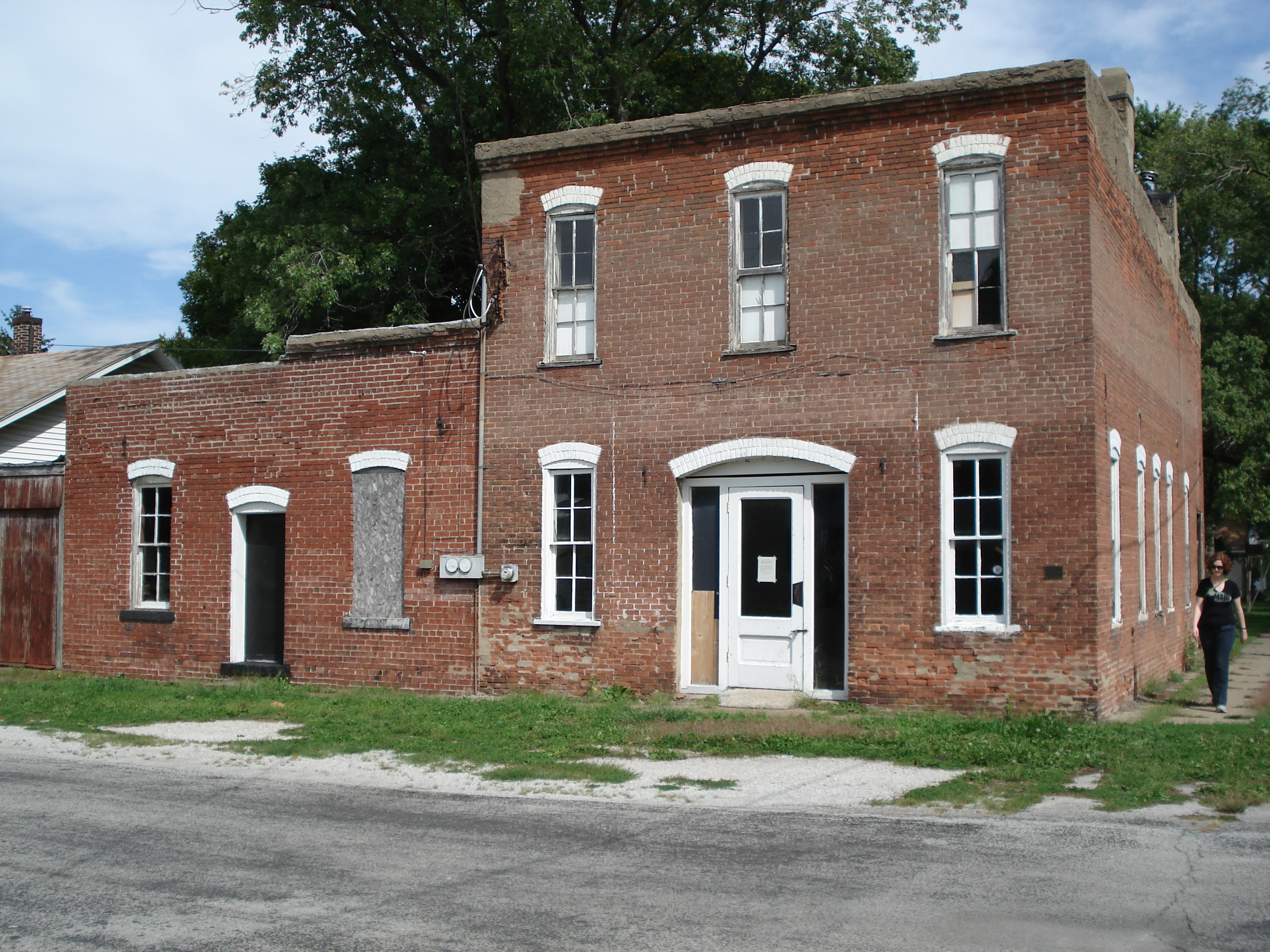

- Location within Illinois Location within the United States
- Location: Newman, Illinois
- Coordinates: 39°47′53″N 87°58′16″W
- Built: 1891
- NRHP reference No.: 91000086
- Added to NRHP: February 21, 1991

The Streibich Blacksmith Shop is a historic blacksmith shop at 1 North Howard Street in Newman, Illinois. The shop was built in 1870 for local blacksmith Ignatius Streibich. Streibich's shop produced farming equipment and domestic items for residents of the area. In addition, Streibich started the first electric power plant in Douglas County in the shop in 1891. While the power plant only lasted a year, it provided a model for future electification efforts in Newman. Streibich retired in 1912, and his son Fred purchased the shop in 1916. Fred Streibich operated the blacksmith shop until his death in 1932. Machinist Kermit O. Tucker operated a shop in the building from 1938 to 1969.

The building was listed on the National Register of Historic Places in 1991. It is one of two sites on the National Register in Douglas County, along with the Arcola Carnegie Public Library in Arcola.
