= Sabco =

Australian cleaning product company

South Australian Brush Company
- Industry: Brushware
- Founded: 1892; 134 years ago in Adelaide, South Australia, Australia
- Founder: W. E. Hay
- Defunct: 2003
- Fate: Subsidiary of Libman USA
- Headquarters: Melbourne, Victoria, Australia

Sabco is an Australian company specialising in cleaning and garden products. It was established in South Australia in 1892 as the South Australian Brush Company by William Ellis Hay. It has been wholly owned by the United States-based Libman Company since 2009. Sabco has been a household name for brooms and brushes in South Australia for over a century.

Initially, the South Australian Brush Company was quite small, and its products were hand crafted. Over time, the company grew, and adopted more automated production processes. In 1930, the factory was in Flinders Street, Adelaide. It established a new factory after World War II in what had been a munitions factory at Hendon.

In 1970, Sabco took over the century-old Melbourne broom and brush company, Zevenboom. In 1979, Sabco acquired the Melbourne-based Dawn Plastics and established a garden products division. In 1981, it acquired a competitor, the Lincoln Brush Company, that had manufactured paint brushes in South Australia for over thirty years.

In 1993, Sabco was acquired out of receivership by the US firm Tomlin Industries. At that time, the factory was in Albert Park, a north-western suburb of Adelaide. In 2003, Sabco was acquired by the US firm Hardware Wholesalers Inc. In May 2007, the Libman Company of the USA took up 50% ownership, increased to 100% in 2009.

== See also ==
- List of oldest companies in Australia
- List of South Australian manufacturing businesses
