= Seeley International =

Australian air conditioning manufacturer

- Type: Private family-owned
- Industry: Manufacturing
- Founded: 1972; 54 years ago
- Founder: Frank Seeley AM
- Headquarters: Lonsdale, Adelaide, South Australia, Australia
- Area served: Oceania, North America, Europe, Africa
- Products: Air-conditioners; Gas heaters
- Brands: Aira; Braemar; Breezair; Cimate Wizard; Convair; Coolair
- Revenue: c.A$1 billion
- Owner: Seeley family
- Number of employees: 460 (2024)
- Website: seeleyinternational.com

Seeley International is an Australian private company that manufactures residential and commercial evaporative air-conditioning and ducted gas heating units, with its headquarters located in Adelaide, South Australia.

== Overview ==
Founded as Seeley Brothers in 1972 by Frank Seeley AM and his brother, the family-owned company is the reportedly the largest manufacturer of heating and cooling systems in Australia; and operates globally, with approximately 460 employees, as of 2024. The company's manufacturing plant is located in the Adelaide suburb of Lonsdale.

In June 2015, the company acquired Coolerado, a Denver–based manufacturer of evaporative air conditioning systems, in the United States; and in 2017, acquired Integrated Comfort Inc., a Californian manufacturer of evaporative air-cooling products.

More than 23,000 of the company's ducted gas heaters malfunctioned between 2015 and 2017. Seeley rectified the fault, successfully sued a negligent component supplier, and, in 2021, was awarded more than A$13 million in damages.

Operating in the New South Wales border city of Albury, in 2017 the company announced plans for a proposed A$20 million plant for the manufacture of gas heaters, located across the border in the Victorian city of Wodonga, in part funded by a grant from the Victorian government's Investment Attraction and Assistance Program. However, after a decline in sales of gas heaters, the plant did not proceed. In March 2024 the company announced plans to close the Albury site in December 2025, blaming the Victorian government's Climate Change Strategy that encouraged consumers to reduce reliance on gas as a heating source.

== See also ==
- List of South Australian manufacturing businesses
- Craig and Seeley, business co-founded by another Seeley brother
