= 2022 Goodyear 400 =

NASCAR Cup Series race

Race details
- Race 12 of 36 in the 2022 NASCAR Cup Series
- The 2022 Goodyear 400 program cover, featuring Dale Earnhardt, Kevin Harvick, and David Pearson.
- Date: May 8, 2022
- Location: Darlington Raceway in Darlington, South Carolina
- Course: Permanent racing facility
- Course length: 1.366 miles (2.198 km)
- Distance: 293 laps, 400.238 mi (644.121 km)
- Average speed: 119.158 miles per hour (191.766 km/h)

Pole position
Driver	Joey Logano	Team Penske
- Time: 28.805

Most laps led
Driver	Joey Logano	Team Penske
- Laps: 108

Winner
No. 22	Joey Logano	Team Penske

Television in the United States
- Network: FS1
- Announcers: Mike Joy, Clint Bowyer, Richard Petty (Stage 1), Bobby Labonte (Stage 2), and Bill Elliott (Stage 3)

Radio in the United States
- Radio: MRN
- Booth announcers: Alex Hayden and Jeff Striegle
- Turn announcers: Dave Moody (1 & 2) and Tim Catafalmo (3 & 4)

The 2022 Goodyear 400 was a NASCAR Cup Series race held on May 8, 2022, at Darlington Raceway in Darlington, South Carolina. Contested over 293 laps on the 1.366-mile (2.198 km) egg-shaped oval, it was the 12th race of the 2022 NASCAR Cup Series season. It was the 66th running of the event.

== Report ==
The layout of Darlington Raceway, the venue where the race was held.

=== Background ===
Darlington Raceway is a race track built for NASCAR racing located near Darlington, South Carolina. It is nicknamed "The Lady in Black" and "The Track Too Tough to Tame" by many NASCAR fans and drivers and advertised as "A NASCAR Tradition." It is of a unique, somewhat egg-shaped design, an oval with the ends of very different configurations, a condition which supposedly arose from the proximity of one end of the track to a minnow pond the owner refused to relocate. This situation makes it very challenging for the crews to set up their cars' handling in a way that is effective at both ends.

On December 11, 2020, Darlington Raceway announced its highly popular NASCAR Throwback weekend would move to the new May 7–9 weekend, effectively making a lineal swap of the two race meetings at the track.

==== Entry list ====
- (R) denotes rookie driver.
- (i) denotes driver who are ineligible for series driver points.

No.	Driver	Team	Manufacturer	Sponsor or Throwback
1	Ross Chastain	Trackhouse Racing Team	Chevrolet	Coca-Cola – Dale Earnhardt Jr.'s 1998 Japan tour paint scheme.
2	Austin Cindric (R)	Team Penske	Ford	Libman/Menards – Rusty Wallace's 2005 No. 2 Kodak paint scheme.
3	Austin Dillon	Richard Childress Racing	Chevrolet	Huk Performance Fishing
4	Kevin Harvick	Stewart-Haas Racing	Ford	Rheem – Harvick's 2011-12 No. 29 Rheem "Chasing a Cure" paint scheme
5	Kyle Larson	Hendrick Motorsports	Chevrolet	Hendrick Chevrolet – Tim Richmond's 1984 Miller Time 300 No. 0 Hendrick Honda Busch Grand National paint scheme.
6	Brad Keselowski	RFK Racing	Ford	Socios.com – Mark Martin's 2004 Pfizer paint scheme.
7	Corey LaJoie	Spire Motorsports	Chevrolet	Stacking Pennies with Corey LaJoie – Marty Robbins' No. 777 paint scheme.
8	Tyler Reddick	Richard Childress Racing	Chevrolet	3Chi
9	Chase Elliott	Hendrick Motorsports	Chevrolet	NAPA Auto Parts – Jimmy Means' 1993 No. 52 paint scheme
10	Aric Almirola	Stewart-Haas Racing	Ford	Haas Automation Smithfield – Tribute to Almirola's grandfather Sam Rodriguez; a three-time Tampa Bay Dirt Sprint Car Champion.
11	Denny Hamlin	Joe Gibbs Racing	Toyota	FedEx Express – Hamlin's 2015–2016 paint scheme.
12	Ryan Blaney	Team Penske	Ford	Advance Auto Parts – Rusty Wallace's 1991 No. 2 Miller Genuine Draft paint scheme.
14	Chase Briscoe	Stewart-Haas Racing	Ford	Mahindra Group – Themed on Tony Stewart's 2001 Indianapolis 500 car, as it was the second time Stewart did double-duty at Indy and Charlotte.
15	J. J. Yeley (i)	Rick Ware Racing	Ford	Ollie's Bargain Outlet – Clint Bowyer’s 2012 5-hour Energy paint scheme.
16	Daniel Hemric (i)	Kaulig Racing	Chevrolet	AG1 by Athletic Greens
17	Chris Buescher	RFK Racing	Ford	Socios.com – Matt Kenseth's 2004 DeWalt paint scheme.
18	Kyle Busch (Note: Trevor Bayne was on standby for Busch this week in case the surrogate carrying his and wife Samantha's child goes into labor.)	Joe Gibbs Racing	Toyota	M&M's – Ernie Irvan's 1998 No. 36 paint scheme. Won a fan vote, as this is slated to be the final year of Mars, Incorporated's NASCAR sponsorship.
19	Martin Truex Jr.	Joe Gibbs Racing	Toyota	Auto-Owners Insurance
20	Christopher Bell	Joe Gibbs Racing	Toyota	SiriusXM – Bell's No. 4 Truck championship paint scheme.
21	Harrison Burton (R)	Wood Brothers Racing	Ford	DEX Imaging – Jeff Burton's 2000 No. 99 Exide paint scheme.
22	Joey Logano	Team Penske	Ford	Shell Pennzoil – Tribute to Logano's quarter midget racing career.
23	Bubba Wallace	23XI Racing	Toyota	MoneyLion – Tribute to Wallace's late model career.
24	William Byron	Hendrick Motorsports	Chevrolet	Axalta – Jeff Gordon's 2007 paint scheme from the company.
31	Justin Haley	Kaulig Racing	Chevrolet	LeafFilter Gutter & Protection
34	Michael McDowell	Front Row Motorsports	Ford	Navage Nasal Care
38	Todd Gilliland (R)	Front Row Motorsports	Ford	Black's Tire
41	Cole Custer	Stewart-Haas Racing	Ford	Haas Tooling – Jason Leffler's 2004 No. 0 NetZero paint scheme from Xfinity.
42	Ty Dillon	Petty GMS Motorsports	Chevrolet	Petty GMS – Lee Petty's 1959 Daytona 500 winning car.
43	Erik Jones	Petty GMS Motorsports	Chevrolet	FOCUSfactor – Richard Petty’s 1959 Daytona 500 debut car.
45	Kurt Busch	23XI Racing	Toyota	McDonald's – Bill Elliott's 1996 No. 94 paint scheme.
47	Ricky Stenhouse Jr.	JTG Daugherty Racing	Chevrolet	Kroger/Nature's Valley
48	Alex Bowman	Hendrick Motorsports	Chevrolet	Ally – Mark Martin's 1993 No. 6 Valvoline paint scheme.
51	Cody Ware	Rick Ware Racing	Ford	Nurtec ODT – Mike Stefanik's 1998 Burnham Boilers Busch Grand National paint scheme.
77	Landon Cassill (i)	Spire Motorsports	Chevrolet	Voyager Crypto
78	B. J. McLeod	Live Fast Motorsports	Ford	None – Tribute to McLeod's 2004 Orlando Speed World Super Late Model car.
99	Daniel Suárez	Trackhouse Racing Team	Chevrolet	Coca-Cola – Dale Earnhardt's 1998 No. 3 Japan tour paint scheme.
Official entry list

== Practice ==
Austin Cindric was the fastest in the practice session with a time of 29.399 seconds and a speed of 167.271 mph (269.197 km/h).

=== Practice results ===
Pos	No.	Driver	Team	Manufacturer	Time	Speed
1	2	Austin Cindric (R)	Team Penske	Ford	29.399	167.271
2	22	Joey Logano	Team Penske	Ford	29.532	166.518
3	11	Denny Hamlin	Joe Gibbs Racing	Toyota	29.544	166.450
Official practice results

== Qualifying ==
Joey Logano scored the pole for the race with a time of 28.805 and a speed of 170.720 mph (274.747 km/h).

=== Qualifying results ===
Pos	No.	Driver	Team	Manufacturer	R1	R2
1	22	Joey Logano	Team Penske	Ford	28.991	28.805
2	5	Kyle Larson	Hendrick Motorsports	Chevrolet	28.736	28.887
3	20	Christopher Bell	Joe Gibbs Racing	Toyota	29.089	28.958
4	19	Martin Truex Jr.	Joe Gibbs Racing	Toyota	28.838	29.048
5	18	Kyle Busch	Joe Gibbs Racing	Toyota	28.994	29.061
6	45	Kurt Busch	23XI Racing	Toyota	29.108	29.077
7	12	Ryan Blaney	Team Penske	Ford	29.057	29.106
8	1	Ross Chastain	Trackhouse Racing Team	Chevrolet	29.209	29.126
9	24	William Byron	Hendrick Motorsports	Chevrolet	29.121	29.161
10	8	Tyler Reddick	Richard Childress Racing	Chevrolet	29.218	29.193
11	43	Erik Jones	Petty GMS Motorsports	Chevrolet	29.125	—
12	10	Aric Almirola	Stewart-Haas Racing	Ford	29.146	—
13	14	Chase Briscoe	Stewart-Haas Racing	Ford	29.153	—
14	3	Austin Dillon	Richard Childress Racing	Chevrolet	29.198	—
15	48	Alex Bowman	Hendrick Motorsports	Chevrolet	29.221	—
16	34	Michael McDowell	Front Row Motorsports	Ford	29.343	—
17	23	Bubba Wallace	23XI Racing	Toyota	29.349	—
18	17	Chris Buescher	RFK Racing	Ford	29.359	—
19	2	Austin Cindric (R)	Team Penske	Ford	29.381	—
20	99	Daniel Suárez	Trackhouse Racing Team	Chevrolet	29.384	—
21	42	Ty Dillon	Petty GMS Motorsports	Chevrolet	29.411	—
22	11	Denny Hamlin	Joe Gibbs Racing	Toyota	29.431	—
23	6	Brad Keselowski	RFK Racing	Ford	29.437	—
24	16	Daniel Hemric (i)	Kaulig Racing	Chevrolet	29.475	—
25	21	Harrison Burton (R)	Wood Brothers Racing	Ford	29.481	—
26	47	Ricky Stenhouse Jr.	JTG Daugherty Racing	Chevrolet	29.555	—
27	38	Todd Gilliland (R)	Front Row Motorsports	Ford	29.599	—
28	41	Cole Custer	Stewart-Haas Racing	Ford	29.661	—
29	31	Justin Haley	Kaulig Racing	Chevrolet	29.662	—
30	7	Corey LaJoie	Spire Motorsports	Chevrolet	29.838	—
31	51	Cody Ware	Rick Ware Racing	Ford	30.054	—
32	15	J. J. Yeley (i)	Rick Ware Racing	Ford	30.191	—
33	77	Landon Cassill (i)	Spire Motorsports	Chevrolet	30.367	—
34	9	Chase Elliott	Hendrick Motorsports	Chevrolet	0.000	—
35	4	Kevin Harvick	Stewart-Haas Racing	Ford	0.000	—
36	78	B. J. McLeod	Live Fast Motorsports	Ford	0.000	—
Official qualifying results

== Race ==
=== Stage Results ===
Stage One Laps: 90

Pos	No	Driver	Team	Manufacturer	Points
1	22	Joey Logano	Team Penske	Ford	10
2	1	Ross Chastain	Trackhouse Racing Team	Chevrolet	9
3	20	Christopher Bell	Joe Gibbs Racing	Toyota	8
4	18	Kyle Busch	Joe Gibbs Racing	Toyota	7
5	19	Martin Truex Jr.	Joe Gibbs Racing	Toyota	6
6	24	William Byron	Hendrick Motorsports	Chevrolet	5
7	11	Denny Hamlin	Joe Gibbs Racing	Toyota	4
8	43	Erik Jones	Petty GMS Motorsports	Chevrolet	3
9	8	Tyler Reddick	Richard Childress Racing	Chevrolet	2
10	23	Bubba Wallace	23XI Racing	Toyota	1
Official stage one results

Stage Two Laps: 95

Pos	No	Driver	Team	Manufacturer	Points
1	1	Ross Chastain	Trackhouse Racing Team	Chevrolet	10
2	19	Martin Truex Jr.	Joe Gibbs Racing	Toyota	9
3	22	Joey Logano	Team Penske	Ford	8
4	11	Denny Hamlin	Joe Gibbs Racing	Toyota	7
5	24	William Byron	Hendrick Motorsports	Chevrolet	6
6	43	Erik Jones	Petty GMS Motorsports	Chevrolet	5
7	20	Christopher Bell	Joe Gibbs Racing	Toyota	4
8	9	Chase Elliott	Hendrick Motorsports	Chevrolet	3
9	10	Aric Almirola	Stewart-Haas Racing	Ford	2
10	99	Daniel Suárez	Trackhouse Racing Team	Chevrolet	1
Official stage two results

=== Final Stage Results ===
Stage Three Laps: 108

Pos	Grid	No	Driver	Team	Manufacturer	Laps	Points
1	1	22	Joey Logano	Team Penske	Ford	293	58
2	10	8	Tyler Reddick	Richard Childress Racing	Chevrolet	293	37
3	29	31	Justin Haley	Kaulig Racing	Chevrolet	293	34
4	35	4	Kevin Harvick	Stewart-Haas Racing	Ford	293	33
5	34	9	Chase Elliott	Hendrick Motorsports	Chevrolet	293	35
6	3	20	Christopher Bell	Joe Gibbs Racing	Toyota	293	43
7	16	34	Michael McDowell	Front Row Motorsports	Ford	293	30
8	26	47	Ricky Stenhouse Jr.	JTG Daugherty Racing	Chevrolet	293	29
9	14	3	Austin Dillon	Richard Childress Racing	Chevrolet	293	28
10	20	99	Daniel Suárez	Trackhouse Racing Team	Chevrolet	293	28
11	12	10	Aric Almirola	Stewart-Haas Racing	Ford	293	28
12	21	42	Ty Dillon	Petty GMS Motorsports	Chevrolet	293	25
13	9	24	William Byron	Hendrick Motorsports	Chevrolet	293	35
14	25	21	Harrison Burton (R)	Wood Brothers Racing	Ford	293	23
15	27	38	Todd Gilliland (R)	Front Row Motorsports	Ford	293	22
16	18	17	Chris Buescher	RFK Racing	Ford	293	21
17	7	12	Ryan Blaney	Team Penske	Ford	293	20
18	19	2	Austin Cindric (R)	Team Penske	Ford	293	19
19	31	51	Cody Ware	Rick Ware Racing	Ford	293	18
20	13	14	Chase Briscoe	Stewart-Haas Racing	Ford	293	17
21	22	11	Denny Hamlin	Joe Gibbs Racing	Toyota	292	27
22	33	77	Landon Cassill (i)	Spire Motorsports	Chevrolet	292	0
23	32	15	J. J. Yeley (i)	Rick Ware Racing	Ford	288	0
24	4	19	Martin Truex Jr.	Joe Gibbs Racing	Toyota	263	28
25	11	43	Erik Jones	Petty GMS Motorsports	Chevrolet	262	20
26	28	41	Cole Custer	Stewart-Haas Racing	Ford	260	11
27	17	23	Bubba Wallace	23XI Racing	Toyota	260	11
28	6	45	Kurt Busch	23XI Racing	Toyota	260	9
29	15	48	Alex Bowman	Hendrick Motorsports	Chevrolet	255	8
30	8	1	Ross Chastain	Trackhouse Racing Team	Chevrolet	194	26
31	24	16	Daniel Hemric (i)	Kaulig Racing	Chevrolet	188	0
32	36	78	B. J. McLeod	Live Fast Motorsports	Ford	184	5
33	5	18	Kyle Busch	Joe Gibbs Racing	Toyota	167	11
34	23	6	Brad Keselowski	RFK Racing	Ford	166	3
35	30	7	Corey LaJoie	Spire Motorsports	Chevrolet	152	2
36	2	5	Kyle Larson	Hendrick Motorsports	Chevrolet	111	1
Official race results

=== Race statistics ===
- Lead changes: 24 among 13 different drivers
- Cautions/Laps: 9 for 47
- Red flags: 0
- Time of race: 3 hours, 21 minutes and 32 seconds
- Average speed: 119.158 miles per hour (191.766 km/h)

== Media ==
=== Television ===
The race was carried by FS1 in the United States. Mike Joy and Clint Bowyer called the race from the broadcast booth. Richard Petty, Bobby Labonte, and Bill Elliott swapped through the booth in stage 1, 2, and 3. Jamie Little and Regan Smith handled pit road for the television side. Larry McReynolds provided insight from the Fox Sports studio in Charlotte.

FS1
Booth announcers	Pit reporters	In-race analyst
Lap-by-lap: Mike Joy; Color-commentator: Clint Bowyer; Color-commentator: Richard Petty (stage 1); Color-commentator: Bobby Labonte (stage 2); Color-commentator: Bill Elliott (stage 3)	Jamie Little; Regan Smith	Larry McReynolds

=== Radio ===
MRN had the radio call for the race, which was also simulcast on Sirius XM NASCAR Radio.

MRN Radio
Booth announcers	Turn announcers	Pit reporters
Lead announcer: Alex Hayden; Announcer: Jeff Striegle	Turns 1 & 2: Dave Moody; Turns 3 & 4: Tim Catafalmo	Steve Post; Dillon Welch

== Standings after the race ==
Drivers' Championship standings

	Pos	Driver	Points
	1	Chase Elliott	453
1	2	William Byron	388 (–65)
1	3	Ryan Blaney	388 (–65)
5	4	Joey Logano	374 (–79)
1	5	Ross Chastain	364 (–89)
2	6	Kyle Busch	364 (–89)
	7	Martin Truex Jr.	364 (–89)
3	8	Alex Bowman	357 (–96)
1	9	Kyle Larson	336 (–117)
	10	Christopher Bell	327 (–126)
1	11	Kevin Harvick	313 (–140)
1	12	Aric Almirola	311 (–142)
	13	Chase Briscoe	287 (–166)
1	14	Austin Dillon	287 (–166)
1	15	Tyler Reddick	286 (–167)
2	16	Erik Jones	282 (–171)
Official driver's standings

Manufacturers' Championship standings

	Pos	Manufacturer	Points
	1	Chevrolet	446
1	2	Ford	406 (–40)
1	3	Toyota	405 (–41)

- Note: Only the first 16 positions are included for the driver standings.
- . – Driver has clinched a position in the NASCAR Cup Series playoffs.

== Notes ==
Previous race: 2022 DuraMAX Drydene 400	NASCAR Cup Series; 2022 season	Next race: 2022 AdventHealth 400
