= Brunswick Gas Works =

Heritage-listed former gasworks in Melbourne, Victoria, Australia

- Location within Melbourne
- Former names: Lux Foundry; Ferrier Company plant; Craig and Seeley plant; Chef cookers plant
- Alternative names: Lux Foundry cafe

General information
- Status: Completed
- Type: Gasworks retort house (1891–1904); Manufacturing plant (1906–2001); Cafe (since 2010)
- Location: 21 Hope Street, Brunswick, Melbourne, Victoria, Australia
- Coordinates: 37°45′51″S 144°57′36″E
- Year built: 1889–1891
- Completed: April 1891; 135 years ago

Height
- Height: 9.1 m (30 ft)

Technical details
- Material: Polychrome bricks; iron
- Size: 40 by 21 m (130 by 70 ft)

Design and construction
- Engineer: Stephen Hutchison

Victorian Heritage Register
- Official name: Brunswick Gas & Coke Company Retort House (former)
- Type: Registered place
- Designated: 17 April 2003
- Reference no.: H2027
- Heritage overlay no.: HO94
- Categories: Manufacturing and Processing; Utilities - Gas

The Brunswick Gas Works was a former gasworks located at 21 Hope Street, Brunswick, an inner northern suburb of Melbourne, in Victoria, Australia. Built between 1889 and 1891, the only extant structure is the gasworks' former retort house. Repurposed several times since its construction, the building has been used as a cafe since 2010.

The former retort house was added to the Victorian Heritage Register on 17 April 2003 in recognition of its architectural and historical significance.

== History ==
=== Gasworks ===
Incorporated on 12 February 1890, the Brunswick Gas and Coke Company commenced building a full complement of gaswork structures from c. 1889 on one hectare (three acres), adjacent to the Upfield railway line in Brunswick. Designed by Stephen Hutchison, a civil engineer, the buildings were completed in April 1891. (Note: Although, it was reported that the Chairman of the Brunswick Gas & Coke Company, at an ordinary general meeting of the company's shareholders, held in May 1892, stated that: "It was a matter of regret that the works were still incomplete… "; referring to the incomplete gas holder.)

The Brunswick Gas and Coke Company made and distributed gas to the Brunswick Council for street lighting and to the local community for domestic consumption. At the time several gasworks operated competitively around Melbourne and plants also existed in some country towns, all with retort houses. These large buildings were central to the gas making process, containing the retorts in which coal was stoked by hand and burned to give off gas which was then purified and stored in a nearby gas holder. Little changed in their technology during the nineteenth century, and Brunswick's huge arch roofed, polychrome brick building was the last built in Melbourne before the era of gas expansion came to an end. The company closed in 1904, and was subsequently purchased by the Metropolitan Gas Company between 1904 and 1906.

=== Appliance manufacture ===
The Lux Foundry, operated by Sir Robert Gibson, purchased the site in 1906 and the retort house served as the company's workshop for the manufacture of cast iron stoves and ranges until the late 1950s when the firm was taken over by the Ferrier Company. In c. 1862, Craig and Seeley took over the Ferrier Company for the manufacture of the company's Chef brand stoves and, in 1963, built modern offices on an adjacent site to the former gasworks/foundry. The retort house was retained in the manufacturing complex as Craig and Seeley achieve rapid growth in sales of their Chef brand stoves that became an enduring household name. The firm was employing more than 500 workers when it closed in 2001; and was producing 2,000 units per day, at its peak.

== Description ==
The former retort house is architecturally important as a rare building type. It is the last retort house to remain from several gas-making works built in the nineteenth century around Melbourne. While some remnant buildings survive from Melbourne's once large gas infrastructure, this is the sole retort house known to remain standing. A twentieth century example stands in Bendigo.

The former retort house is historically important for its association with the gas industry. The site has a long history of association with the industry, first as a gasworks where gas was manufactured, then as a foundry where cast iron stoves were made and more recently as a modern plant for manufacturing gas appliances. The building is representative of the boom period of Melbourne's once expansive gas industry and the competition that developed between the Metropolitan Gas Company and several suburban companies.

The former retort house stands in juxtaposition with the modernist Craig and Seeley offices of 1963, also listed on the Victorian Heritage Register, the two buildings providing a narrative of our changing use of gas and its associated technologies.

== See also ==
- Architecture of Melbourne
- List of places on the Victorian Heritage Register in the City of Merri-bek
