= Alfred Metters =

Australian Baptist minister

Alfred Metters (c. 1863 – 1 March 1918) was an Australian Baptist minister, remembered for his chaplaincy in South Australia during World War I.

== History ==
Alfred Metters was born in Melbourne, the youngest child of James Metters (c. 1821 – 2 October 1881), a bricklayer from Cornwall and his wife Susan Metters, née Flux (c. 1824 – 4 July 1875), from the Isle of Wight, who arrived in Victoria some time before December 1854. His brothers Charles Henry Metters (c. 1853–1929), John Thomas Metters (c. 1853–1924) and Frederick Metters (1858–1937) were ironworkers, founders of the Victorian firm of Metters Bros., oven and stove manufacturers. Sometime before 1880, Frederick left for South Australia, where he was associated with the Norwood Baptist Church and there patented his "top fire" stove design in 1891 and founded his own business which eventually became Metters Limited.

Metters followed brother Fred to Adelaide on the SS Victorian in February 1883, and is reported as being engaged in commercial affairs of an unidentified nature, but quite likely with his brother. His heart was however in matters religious, as he was soon involved in various Baptist causes. He became Secretary to the Gospel Temperance Mission, and preached the Temperance cause for the Blue Ribbon Army, of which he became president in 1884. He was also closely involved with the YMCA and Band of Hope. In 1885 he began studying for the ministry at Union College, and in 1888 he began his ministry as pastor at Goodwood Baptist Church. In 1889 he became manager of Truth and Progress, the Baptist newsletter. In 1890 he and Rev. E. J. Henderson, pastor of the Baptist church at Laura, South Australia exchanged pulpits. In February 1892 he relinquished the pastorate of Laura and Appila for Jamestown, Georgetown and Cloverhill, which he resigned in November that year, and took over the Hill Street Baptist Church at Kapunda. He resigned that post and returned to Goodwood early in 1886. His next posting was in late 1898 to Mount Barker, but was suffering ill health, and resigned in May 1900 rather than face another cold winter in the hills, and was given a short-term posting at Magill. While in Mount Barker, he founded a Berean association.

In May 1901, he accepted a call to Katanning, Western Australia, and in 1902 was appointed Superintendent of Baptist Home Missions and Vice-president of the Baptist Union of WA. He transferred to Fremantle in December 1902, being succeeded by Rev. A. A. Medley, and shortly after was elected Secretary of the Baptist Union of Western Australia, while retaining the vice-presidency, followed by the presidency in November. His health suffered however, and in March 1904, he returned to South Australia.

Back in Adelaide, Metters represented the British and Foreign Bible Society and undertook various preaching roles for the Baptist Church. Around November, he returned to Perth, where in April 1905, he was appointed editor of the Day Dawn and Baptist Church Messenger, but spent much of that year in Tasmania, and was appointed minister of the Devonport Baptist Church early in 1906.

He left for Sydney in March 1907, where he had been appointed to the Granville and Liverpool churches, experimentally made into one circuit, but relinquished the pastorate a year later. He was recognised as being the instigator in 1906 of Federal Congresses of the Baptist Church in Australia, first held in September 1908.

He received a call by the Hindmarsh Baptist Church, which he took up in June 1909. He added the Prospect church to his responsibilities in 1911. While pastor at Hindmarsh its finances improved sufficiently for considerable expansion to be undertaken. In 1912 he relinquished pastorate of Hindmarsh, but continued his association with Prospect. He was a proponent of a referendum for compulsory Bible instruction in State schools, and organizing secretary of the Scriptural Instruction in State Schools League.

=== Writing ===
For many years he conducted (as "Cousin Felix") the children's page in The Southern Baptist (later renamed The Australian Baptist)

=== Chaplaincy ===
In 1906 while in Tasmania he was appointed Chaplain (4th Class) with the Chaplains' Department of the Australian Military Forces, an appointment that followed him in his subsequent moves. By 1913 he had been elevated to the military rank of captain, and in 1915 re-graded from Chaplain 4th class to Senior Chaplain, 1st Class (Other Protestant denominations), and promoted to Chaplain-Colonel in 1915. In February 1918 he was admitted to the No. 15 Australian General Hospital, North Adelaide, following a nervous breakdown, and died there a few weeks later.

== Family ==
Alfred Metters (c. 1863 – 1 March 1918) married Ottilie Caroline Strempel at Mannum, South Australia on 29 August 1888. They had two sons and two daughters.
