= Pope Products =

Australian manufacturing company (1935–1963)

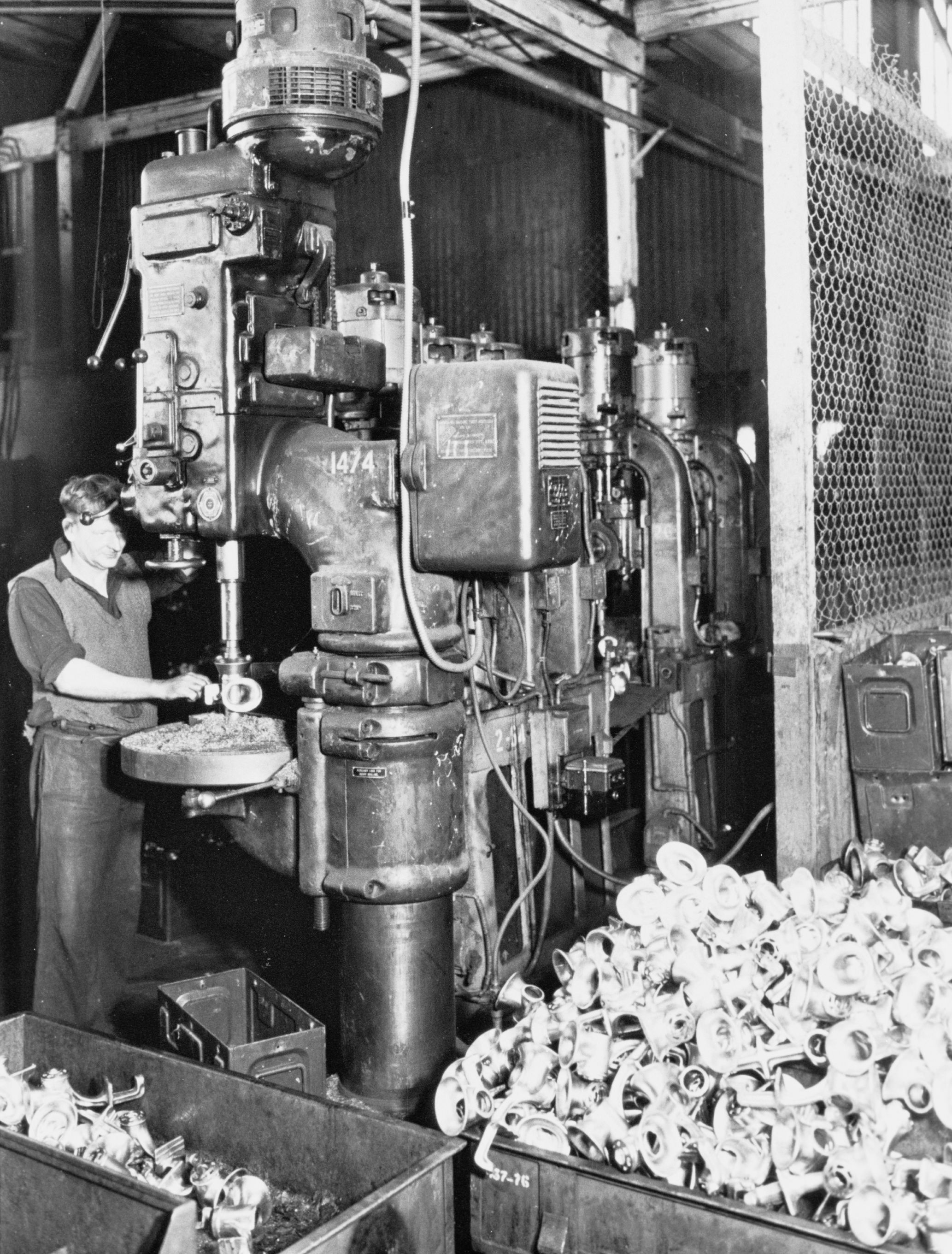
- Pope Products factory
- Founded: 1935
- Founders: Sidney Barton Pope; Harley Clifford Pope
- Defunct: 1963
- Fate: Amalgamated with A. M. Simpson and Sons
- Successor: Simpson-Pope Holdings Ltd
- Headquarters: Beverley, South Australia
- Services: Manufacture of domestic goods

Pope Products Ltd was an Australian manufacturer, based in Beverley, South Australia, best remembered for washing machines and refrigerators.

The company was founded in 1935 by Sidney Barton Pope (18 February 1905 – 2 September 1983) (generally referred to as "Barton" or "S. Barton Pope" and from 1959 "Sir Barton") and his brother Harley Clifford Pope (6 April 1908 – ) to manufacture irrigation equipment with an initial capitalisation of £15,000 in £1 shares.

== History ==
Barton Pope and his brothers Raymond and Harley were born in Northam, Western Australia and moved to South Australia with their parents in 1913. Their father, previously a storekeeper, began manufacturing irrigation components at their 56? 66? Robert Street, West Croydon home. The boys were educated at Pulteney College (later Pulteney Grammar School) and at age 14 Barton began working for his father. What started as a father and son operation grew into a small business registered in 1928 as "Pope Sprinklers Ltd" with shareholders Henry, Barton and Harley Pope, Lily Maria Pope and J. H. Richards. A new company, "Pope Products Ltd" was floated in 1934 to take over the assets of the old company, which went into voluntary liquidation. Shareholders were the two Pope brothers, R. F. Smith, S. H. Carman and Winifred Laura Browne.

Around 1935 the company moved its operations to Charles Road, Beverley. From 1939 an increasing output from the factory was directed towards the war effort; chiefly stamped and cast parts for munitions destined for the Commonwealth munitions factory at Maribyrnong, Victoria and for aircraft production at the Commonwealth Aircraft Corporation at Fishermans Bend. The factory underwent significant expansion in the immediate post-war period.

The company acquired premises in Finsbury

The company was not noted for employee relations: in the early days they made extensive use of juniors 14–16 years of age as machine operators and menial labour to avoid paying award wages (hence its local nickname "The Boy Farm"). Accidents were not uncommon. With growing union militancy and the Communist threat in the late 1940s, Pope Products became a model employer. It introduced a generous incentive scheme; in 1953 bonuses to its workers exceeded dividends paid to shareholders; the same year it instituted an employees' recreation hall and sponsored sporting activities for its workers and staff.

The company entered the Australian vernacular. "Is the Pope a washing machine" was a popular play on the rhetorical question "Is the Pope Catholic?"

== Products ==
The output of the various Pope Products factories included:

- Lawn and garden sprinklers
- Agricultural Sprinklers: Typhoon, Monsoon, Premier and Butterfly. With the Butterfly sprinkler also being extensively used in domestic applications.
- "Ned Kelly" repeating cap gun, "Aussie" single-shot cap gun
- Woodworking tools: planes, chisels
- Rotary lawn mowers, endorsed by Lew Hoad
- Hand and powered "tumbler" mowers
- Wringer washing machines
- Refrigerators
- PopeAire air conditioners
- Pope-Motorola television sets and Hi-Fi Stereo Cabinets, endorsed by Jack Davey
- Electric motors

== Amalgamation ==
In 1963 Pope Products and A. Simpson and Son amalgamated as Simpson-Pope Holdings Ltd to manufacture washing machines and refrigerators. The company became Simpson Holdings in 1979, and in 1986 was absorbed by Email Limited, which in turn became part of the Electrolux manufacturing group in 2000.

Toro Australia took over Pope Products, South Australian manufacturers of residential garden watering and irrigation equipment, which business they sold in 2024 to the AMES Company, Inc., a subsidiary of Griffon Corporation. Brands owned by the Ames Company's Australian subsidiary around that time include

- Cyclone Tools
- Gardenmaster
- La Hacienda
- Hills
- Kelso
- Nylex
- Northcote Pottery
- Supercraft
- Trojan Tools
- Tuscan Path
- Westmix

and hence also Pope Products. In 2026 Ames True Temper became a wholly North American company and the majority of these brands were acquired by Griffon ANZ.

== Family ==
Raymond, Barton and Harley Pope were sons of Henry Pope and his wife Sarah Anne, née Nunn (ca.1868 – 7 March 1947). The two younger sons were talented violinists; Harley in particular was described as "brilliant".

=== Barton Pope ===
Sidney Barton Pope married Lily Maria Howard on 19 March 1927; they divorced in 1942. He married again, to Ada Lillian McCarthy née Hawkins on 15 June 1944 shortly after her divorce. Barton's children included:

- Barbara Barton Pope (9 September 1928 – )
- John Brenton Pope (20 February 1933 – )
- Ian Murray Pope (13 June 1938 – )
- adopted daughter Susan Pope

Barton Pope was admitted to the SA Chamber of Manufactures in 1929 and was its president in 1949. He was knighted in 1959 "for services to commerce and industry". Their home for many years was Martin Ave, Fitzroy, South Australia. He owned a number of country properties: Yarindale station, 17 miles (30 km) from Meningie and citrus orchards at Swanbury and Allawah, near Swan Reach He was a pioneer of the use of trace elements to restore fertility to ancient soils.

=== Harley Pope ===
Harley Clifford Pope (6 April 1908 – 14 July 1985) married Alison Victoria Sterling (24 May 1910 – 21 October 2009) on 23 April 1935. Their children were:

- David Pope ( – )
- Elizabeth Pope (4 April 1943 – 2 July 2025 )
