= Metters Building =

Heritage-listed building in Sydney, Australia

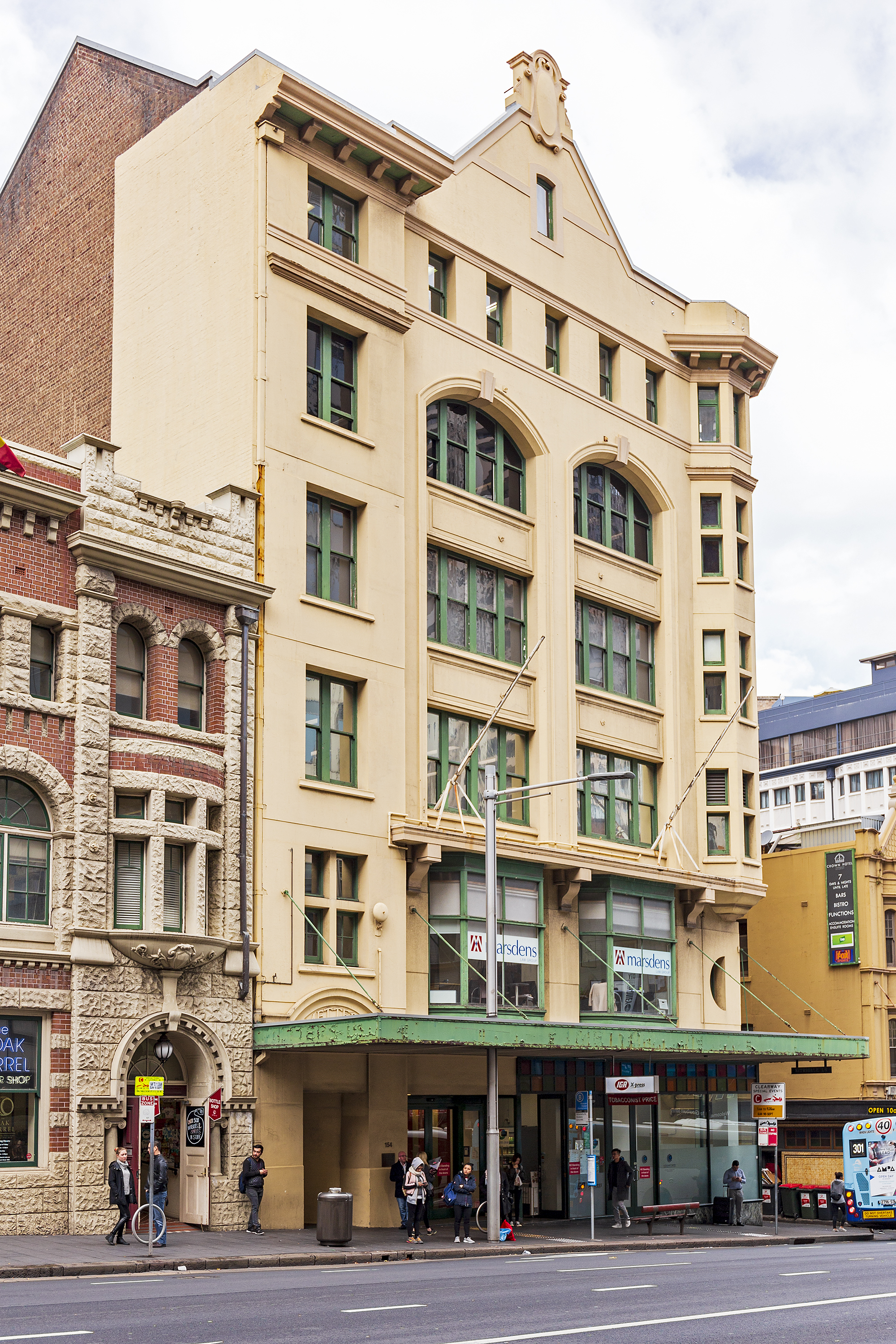
- Metters Building, 154-158 Elizabeth Street, Sydney, NSW

- Location within Sydney Location within Australia
- 33.8780°S 151.2098°E
- Location: 154-158 Elizabeth Street, Sydney central business district, City of Sydney, New South Wales, Australia

History
- Built: 1914

Site notes
- Architect(s): Robertson and Marks
- Architectural styles: Federation Anglo Dutch; Federation Free Style

New South Wales Heritage Register
- Official name: Metters Building
- Type: State heritage (built)
- Designated: 2 April 1999
- Reference no.: 732
- Type: Commercial Office/Building
- Category: Commercial
- Builders: W. Gawne & Sons

The Metters Building is a heritage-listed office building at 154-158 Elizabeth Street, in the Sydney central business district, in the City of Sydney local government area of New South Wales, Australia. It was designed by Robertson and Marks and built by W. Gawne & Sons in 1914. It was added to the New South Wales State Heritage Register on 2 April 1999.

== History ==
The stove manufacturer Metters Limited bought this site, next to the building that was then called the Concordia Hall, from the City of Sydney early in April 1913 for £10,000. Later that month The Sydney Morning Herald announced that architects Robertson & Marks were drawing up plans for "a large four-storey building for showrooms and offices." These plans for a 4-storeyed building were approved in June 1913, but by July the plans had been changed to six storeys. The Sydney Morning Herald reported that Messrs Robertson & Marks were about to sign a contract to erect "a very fine building of six storeys for Metters Ltd". The Herald went on to write that "the elevation to Elizabeth Street will be of an attractive design, mostly in the Old English style of architecture" and that on the corner of Nithsdale Lane there would be "a large oriel window from the first floor to the sixth storey, surmounted by a tower." There were to be "many large windows" along the frontage to the lane, contributing, wrote The Herald, to make the building "one of the best lighted in the city."

It underwent alterations to the shopfront c. 1980.

== Description ==
Metters Building is located in a mixed streetscape along Elizabeth Street. It is a six-storey building of Federation Anglo Dutch style with a corner oriel window and a central two bay facade surmounted by a high triangular pediment.

The tower to the oriel window is missing. An unusual use of a projecting cornice occurs to the oriel window and the end bay which balances it in an asymmetrically manner. The central bays are distinguished by arched windows divided by solid spandrels. At the sixth floor smaller flat arched windows form part of an entablature frieze. At the first floor an entablature is supported by projecting brackets. The facade below the awning has been significantly modified. Internally the plan is rectangular with a rear lightwell.

The interior is lacking in quality detailing but is quite intact with original metal ceilings and glass to the toilet area. The building is unusual for its original timber fire stair. It is significantly intact above the ground floor level.

Domenico Chisari is the longest maintenance personnel to be employed at the site from 1974 to present and has a vast knowledge of residence of the building since that time.

== Heritage listing ==
The Metters' Building is part of a group of early twentieth-century commercial buildings that have retained a high degree of architectural integrity, sufficient to form a distinctive aesthetic precinct representing the period 1910-1914. The retention of Federation Free Style detailing above the ground floor is significant.

The Metters Building was listed on the New South Wales State Heritage Register on 2 April 1999.

== See also ==
- Australian non-residential architectural styles
- Media related to Metters Building at Wikimedia Commons
