= Lawn Rangers =

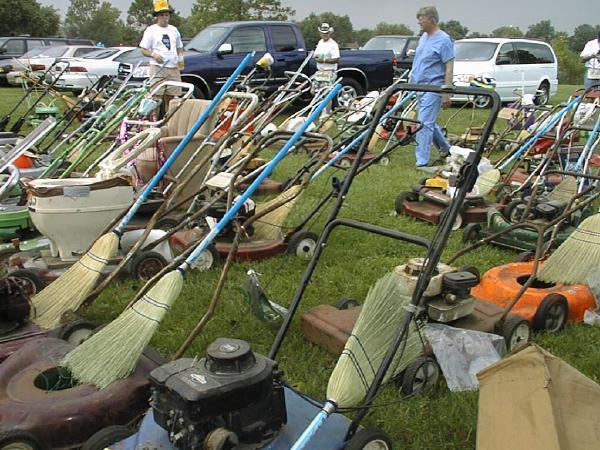
The "World Famous" Lawn Rangers

The Lawn Rangers are a "precision lawn mower drill team" from Arcola, Illinois.

Founded in 1980 by two men from Arcola, Illinois and LaGrange, Illinois, the Lawn Rangers are not the first of their kind. The men, Pat Monahan and John O'Halloran, decided that they wanted to be in their hometown parades, the annual Broom Corn Festival parade and the LaGrange Pet Parade, so they started to think about what skills they possessed. After deciding that they didn't have any, their wives told them that the only common skill they had was for mowing the lawn. Since Pat Monahan was part owner of the Thomas Monahan Broom Company, they decided to push lawn mowers and toss brooms in the parade. They still needed a name for what they were doing. Clayton Moore, the original Lone Ranger, was the grand marshal of that year's Broom Corn Parade, so they became the World Famous "Lawn Rangers." Over the years the Lawn Rangers have lived life by their motto: You're only young once, but you can always be immature.

The group has participated in a number of parades including the Holiday Bowl parade in San Diego, California, the Fiesta Bowl parade in Tempe, Arizona, the Indianapolis 500 parade, and the Pro Football Hall of Fame Game parade in Canton, Ohio. The group considers the Broomcorn Festival parade in Arcola to be their flagship parade, with a group of lawn mower pushers in t-shirts at the La Grange Pet Parade La Grange, Illinois serving as their initial inspiration.

Of the participants, perhaps the most famous is humorist Dave Barry, who has marched with the parade on a number of occasions and written about them in his column.

The Illinois General Assembly honored the Lawn Rangers with a resolution commemorating their achievements in 2005.

On November 12, 2008, the nationally syndicated television show Inside Edition did a feature story on the Lawn Rangers and the fact that Barack Obama was pictured with them holding a green toilet plunger in 2003, and that the Lawn Rangers were under consideration for participation in the January 20, 2009, United States Presidential Inaugural Parade. This story on Inside Edition has been featured as one of many Lawn Rangers related entries on YouTube.

Banner

On December 5, 2008, The Lawn Rangers were officially invited to march in the January 20, 2009, United States Presidential Inaugural Parade. On the day of the parade, lawn mowers were decorated for the occasion, with one mower sporting a large blow-up photo of Obama waving the plunger. The president pointed to the picture when he spotted it in the parade, and he and Mrs. Obama laughed.
