= Arcola Carnegie Public Library =

Carnegie library in Arcola, Illinois, US

- U.S. National Register of Historic Places
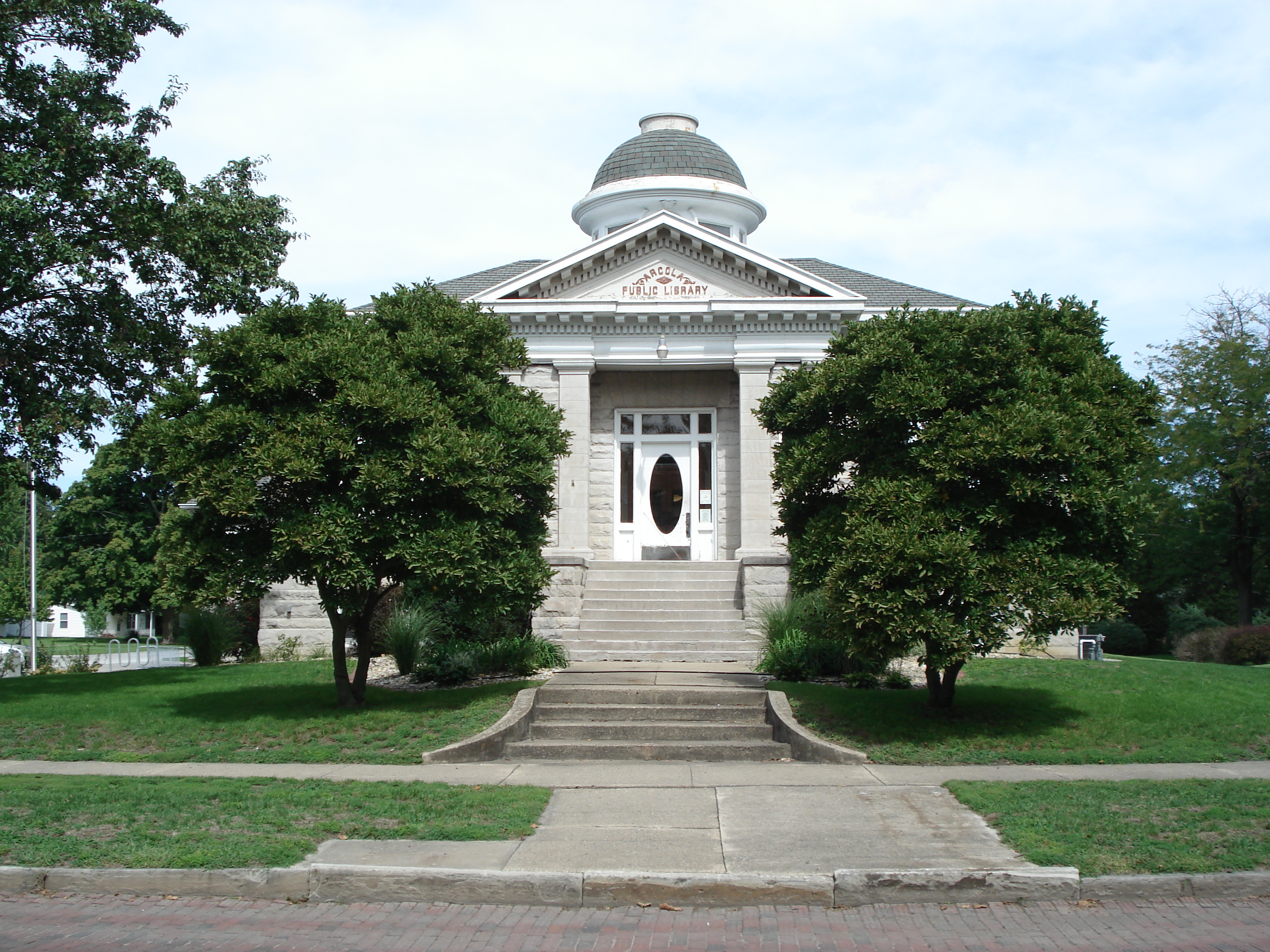

- Location within Illinois Location within the United States
- Location: 407 E. Main St., Arcola, Illinois
- Coordinates: 39°41′10″N 88°18′11″W
- Built: 1905
- Built by: Morehead, J.P.
- Architect: Moratz, Paul A.
- Architectural style: Classical Revival
- MPS: Illinois Carnegie Libraries MPS
- NRHP reference No.: 02000459
- Added to NRHP: May 9, 2002

The Arcola Carnegie Public Library is a Carnegie library located at 407 E. Main St. in Arcola, Illinois. The library was built in 1905 through a $10,000 grant from the Carnegie Foundation. Architect Paul O. Moratz designed the library in the Classical Revival style. The building's front entrance is situated within a Classical gabled portico supported by stone pilasters. The hipped roof of the building features an ornamental cornice along its edge and a cupola at its peak. The building still serves as Arcola's public library and houses a collection of over 18,000 books.

The library was listed on the National Register of Historic Places in 2002. It is one of two sites on the National Register in Douglas County, along with the Streibich Blacksmith Shop in Newman.
