= A. W. Dobbie =

Australian inventor and businessman

Alexander Williamson Dobbie
- Born: 12 November 1843; Glasgow, Scotland
- Died: 18 July 1912 (aged 68); College Park, South Australia
- Occupations: brassfounder, engineer, inventor, lecturer, mesmerist, businessman and travel writer
- Spouse: Esther Catherine Elizabeth nee Wallis (1843–1925)
- Children: 11
- Parent(s): William Dobbie (1813–1879), and Sophia Dobbie née Monteith (c. 1817–1884)

Alexander Williamson Dobbie (12 November 1843 – 18 July 1912) was a Scots-born Australian brassfounder, engineer, inventor, lecturer, mesmerist, businessman and travel writer. He founded A. W. Dobbie & Co. manufacturing company, and the hardware and homewares store Dobbie's, which continued into the 1960s in Adelaide and the 1930s in Perth, Western Australia.

== Family and early life ==
=== Early life ===
Alexander Williamson Dobbie was born in Glasgow, Scotland, on 12 November 1843, to son of William Dobbie (1813 – 12 January 1879), jeweller and engraver, and his wife Sophia Monteith Dobbie (c. 1817 – 9 September 1884).

Thomas Dobbie and William Dobbie and their families arrived on 5 March 1851 at Port Adelaide on the Three Bells, an iron ship of 640 tons from Glasgow.

Alexander was schooled at James Bath's school in North Adelaide, then at age 14 in 1858, after a few months as a draper's assistant, was apprenticed to machinist and brassfounder G. Schwan, formerly of Berends & Schwan, of Gawler Place, three doors from Rundle Street, who went out of business in 1860. It is likely that he completed his apprenticeship with, and worked for, another brassfounder, perhaps Richard Hutchinson. At age 19, Dobbie began working on his own account, in premises on Gawler Place.

=== Family ===
The Scots-born children of William Dobbie and his wife Sophia Monteith Dobbie née Minto were:

- Thomas Dobbie (9 June 1836 – 19 December 1886) married Matilda Louisa Barns née Ladd (1859 – 1938), daughter of J. O. Ladd, on 31 May 1884
- John Forgie Dobbie (c. 1837 – 13 November 1870 in New Zealand)
- William Dobbie, jr., (c. 1835 – 28 April 1908) married Janet James (c. 1843–1932) in Melbourne on 19 January 1866
- Alexander Williamson Dobbie (1843–1912)
- James Dobbie (1846–1879)

Five more children were born in South Australia:

- Grace Gardner Dobbie (born 1851), who married Henry John Thompson on 10 April 1873 (Note: Cited as eldest daughter of William Dobbie.)
- Robert Tulloch Dobbie (1853 – c. 21 August 1919), who married Anne Frood Cornish "Annie" Champion (died 1909) on 22 November 1877
- Francis Dobbie (born 1857)
- Henry (8 January 1862 – 1867), who married Louisa Emma Strother in 1895
- Alice Maud Dobbie (born 26 November 1867) (Note: There was a Thomas Dobbie, in partnership with Charles Pearce as butchers of Gawler Feb. 1856 – May 1857, insolvent September 1857. Also a Thomas Dobbie of Aldgate (c. 1845–1914) married Emma Mundy (died 1926) in 1891.)

William Dobbie Sr. was a partner with John Wald in Wald & Dobbie, watchmakers & jewellers of 83 Rundle Street from 1865 to 1866, then became the sole trading jeweller of Gawler Place. He died at his home in Charles Street, Norwood, South Australia, on 12 January 1879 and James died at his home in West Street, Unley, South Australia, on 10 December 1879. Advertisements in the name of A. & J. Dobbie continued to appear well into the next decade.

James Williamson Dobbie (12 January 1846 – 10 December 1879) married Sarah Elizabeth Revell (died 1933) on 26 December 1867. They had five children: Alfred Simpson Dobbie (born 11 June 1870), Edgar Allan Dobbie (15 July 1871 – 1934), Florence Edith Dobbie (born 1873) married Robert William Tayler in 1896, Horace Leeson Dobbie (born 3 July 1874), Walter Campbell Dobbie (18 July 1876 – 1947) married Edith Rosalie Wright in 1903, and Elsie Revell Dobbie (5 February 1878 – 26 June 1942) married Charles Basil Sheidow on 1 March 1913. She was a teacher.

== Career and interests ==
=== Manufacturing ===
In July 1864, he moved to premises "adjacent to Padman & Co.", Gawler Place, Adelaide, South Australia.

His company won a silver medal at the Exhibition held in conjunction with Prince Alfred's visit in 1867. The articles exhibited included the brass level used by the Prince in laying the foundation stone for the Victoria Tower, and a pair of "transit Y"s used by Charles Todd in his role as Government Astronomer. The company began electro-plating in around 1870.

The business suffered two serious incidents that could have had tragic consequences. Their apparatus used for generating the oxygen needed for high-temperature welding was a retort charged with potassium chlorate and manganese dioxide as a catalyst. This is a time-honored and inexpensive way of producing oxygen but critically relies on purity of the reagents concerned. One day in July 1866, the catalyst must have been contaminated, perhaps with graphite or antimony, as the apparatus exploded, blowing out part of a wall, the ceiling, doors and a window. Fortunately no-one was in the workshop at the time, as serious injury or death would have been almost certain. In January 1874, a fire broke out in the foundry, and all the irreplaceable patterns were destroyed, but by prompt action by the fire department, the fire did not spread to the rest of the building or those adjacent.

Among the articles cast by Dobbie was a set of handbells, to patterns made by George Marshall of Waymouth Street. Also produced in the factory were highly-finished brass "church furniture": crosses, candlesticks, vases, alms dishes and lecterns.

During a visit to the United States at the time of the 1876 Philadelphia Exposition, Alex Dobbie became an enthusiast for their technology, with the result that the Gawler Place shop began advertising a diverse range of American "tools, novelties and general machinery".

They began developing and manufacturing farm machinery with a patented broadcast seed-sower, and took out patents for improvements to pumps and chaffcutters in 1877. Having absorbed the principles behind the invention of the telephone, he developed similar instruments which he and Charles Todd demonstrated at an Adelaide Philosophical Society exhibition at the Adelaide Town Hall in 1878.

In 1876, he was involved in the process of standardizing hose couplings used by fire brigades throughout South Australia.

In 1885, he erected a new two-storey building behind the showroom in Gawler Place, and a new foundry building on the Pirie Street corner, just in time to satisfy a major Government contract in connection with an expansion of Adelaide's water reticulation system.

Dobbie & Co. began manufacturing their own "Standard" brand of bicycle in around 1895, and carried several other brands of US and UK manufacture.

=== Business and retail ===
His manufacturing business was profitable, but it was the sale of goods imported from Britain and, especially, America that made him wealthy.

In 1868, he began advertising sewing machine repairs along with brassfounding and electroplating, and later became an sales outlet for several manufacturers. In 1871, he founded the "Adelaide Sewing Machine Depot", and, in July 1872, erected new showrooms and a workshop, with 25 different makers' machines on display.

Alex's younger brother, James, who had training as a machinist (perhaps with A. Simpson & Son), joined the firm some time before August 1873.

As A. & J. Dobbie, at "Adelaide Sewing Machine Depot" they sold and repaired various makes of sewing machine, also advertising revolvers and guns "for the Northern Territory", and "brassfounding carried on as usual".

The shop in Gawler Place diversified even further, selling products such as Swedish "Domo" cream separators, Zonophone gramophone records, American Mason & Hamlin organs and Chickering, and the cheaper German Fritz Kuhla (Note: Made by Euterpe Pianos est. 1875 in Berlin.) pianos. American Waterbury watches, English Brinsmead and German Neumeyer pianos, and Wertheim sewing machines were popular and profitable products.

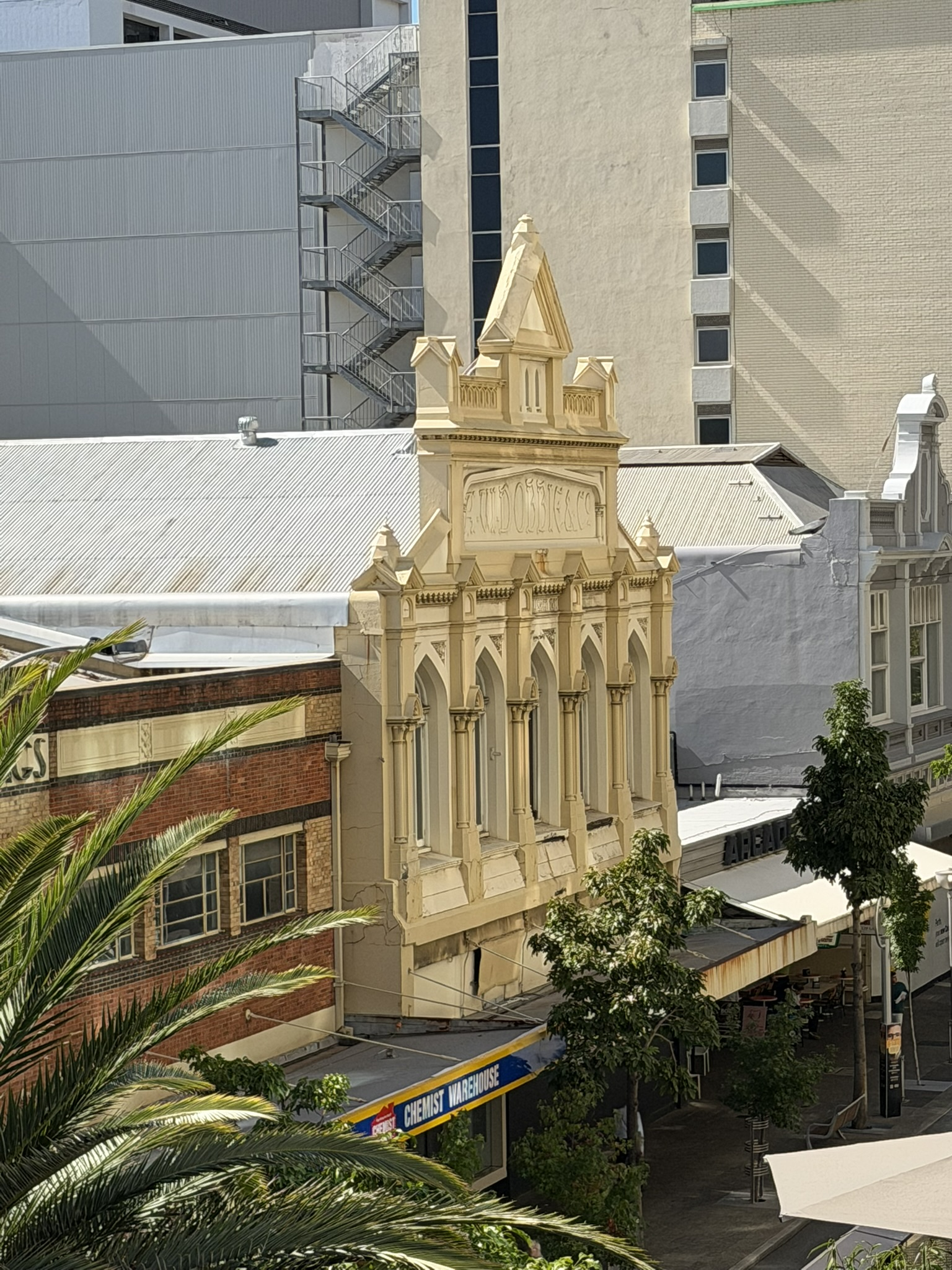
The side of an A. W. Dobbie & Co. façade at 804-808 Hay Street, Perth, Western Australia in 2026

In 1895, a branch of the company was established at 307–309 Hay Street east, Perth, Western Australia, and in 1898, opened showrooms closer to the centre of town at 459 Hay Street, with agencies in Kalgoorlie, Fremantle and Bunbury. A grandiose new showroom at 580–582 Hay Street was opened in 1906. The Western Australian factory closed in the 1920s after adverse rulings on tradesmen's and apprentices' pay, and retail operations were taken over by Arthur W. Lushey in 1932.

In about 1903, the firm was restructured as a private company jointly owned by Alexander Williamson Dobbie, James Edward Molloy Morley, Alexander Herbert Dobbie and Hector John Dobbie. Hector died in 1906 and the partnership was dissolved in December 1910.

=== Other interests ===
His home in College Park was well known for its profusion of mechanical and scientific gadgets and curiosities, and his garden, where he grew an abundance of prize-winning flowers.

He was a prominent member of the Royal Agricultural Society, Photographic Society (vice president in 1895 and president in 1896 and 1897), League of the Empire, Adelaide Philosophical Society, Adelaide Benevolent and Strangers' Friend Society, Royal Geographical Society, Chamber of Manufactures, director of Broken Hill Proprietary, and from age 18 an adherent of the Wesleyan Methodist church and a Sunday School superintendent for 10 years, latterly at the Kent Town church. A proud Scotsman, he was a founding member of the Royal Caledonian Society of South Australia.

He was member of the General Committee and the Executive of both Prince Alfred College and the Methodist Ladies' College.

Largely self-educated, he was by some dubbed "Adelaide's Edison" for his inventiveness, absorption in his work, and his absent-mindedness. Influenced by his friend and kindred spirit D. B. Adamson, he took a great interest in astronomy. He built several telescopes from instructions found in English Mechanic magazine. His first telescope, completed in 1874, had a 6.5-centimetre (2.6 in) (glass, not speculum metal) reflector, and his second, which took 11 years to complete, had a 12.5-centimetre-diameter (4.9 in) reflector, the largest privately owned telescope in Australia. He ground and silvered (to a method expounded by John Browning) the mirror himself, and cast and turned the mount and all the mechanism, all in brass of course. In 1895 he demonstrated projection of stereoscopic images using red and green filters on the two oxyhydrogen projectors. The following year he demonstrated X-ray photography in conjunction with Professor W. H. Bragg. He experimented with the "audiphone", by which some deaf persons were able to hear by amplified sound being transmitted through the teeth.

He gave many lectures on scientific and occult subjects and gave demonstrations on hypnosis, or mesmerism, which he treated seriously rather than as a stage act. He was an expert hypnotist, and on several occasions demonstrated its use in dentistry. He was particularly interested in the phenomenon of clairvoyance apparently exhibited by hypnotised subjects.

He undertook at least two world tours, in 1876 and 1888 or 1889, the subjects of two books, each titled Rough Notes of a Traveller ... He also toured India from 1893 to 1894, and New Guinea and South Pacific islands in 1899. During this latter trip he contracted malaria, from which he never fully recovered.

He was one of a party sent by the Royal Astronomical Society under G. F. Dodwell to Bruni Island, off Tasmania, to document the total solar eclipse of 9 May 1910, when the period of totality was over 3 minutes. Dobbie used his 12-inch and 6-inch reflectors with special long focal-length cameras to record the sun's coronas, a subject of intense interest.

== Later firm history ==
Alexander Herbert Dobbie (25 July 1875 – 1965) took over the firm as managing director. He was a member of Chamber of Manufactures (vice-president in 1925), on the board of the Advisory Council of Education 1920, the State Advisory Council of Science and Industry, and a prominent member of the East Adelaide Lawn Tennis Club. He retired as chairman of directors in 1951.

Later manufactures include a range of spraying equipment and irrigation fittings. "Dobbie Dico Meter Co. Ltd" was founded in 1935 or earlier, with premises in Sultram Place, off Sturt Street, Adelaide, making water meters, many of which may still be seen on South Australian properties.

The retail store in Gawler Place was incorporated into the Savery group of companies but continued to trade independently into the 1960s.

In 1940, A. H. Dobbie and William "Bill" Bardon (died October 1972) established "Dobbie Dico Meter Co.", a brass foundry in Wittenoom Street, East Perth, to manufacture water meters for the Western Australian market, and also had useful contracts with the US Navy dockyards in WA during World War II and later. In 1952, the company acquired the nearby company of Kay & Heron, an iron and steel foundry. By this time, the company was "Dobbie" in name only. In 1961, Dobbie Dico began manufacture of "Eclipse" brand fire extinguishers and other fire protection products. With his death, Bill's son Stan Bardon (died 2004) took over the company and in March 1998, with the expansion of suburban Perth, they moved to new larger premises at 430 Victoria Road, Málaga, some 10 kilometres (6.2 mi) north of Perth's CBD, where they continue to this day under Stan Bardon's son Phil Bardon, manufacturing civil water engineering products.

== Personal life and death ==
Alexander Dobbie married Esther Catherine Elizabeth Wallis (c. 1845 – 10 October 1925) on 6 June 1865. They had 11 children.

Alexander Williamson Dobbie died at his residence, "Rothesay Villa", Baliol Street, College Park.

== Bibliography ==
- A. W. Dobbie Rough notes of a traveller : being an account of a trip round the world, via Ceylon, Arabia, Egypt, Italy, France, England, America, Sandwich Islands, Fiji, & c. Adelaide : William Kyffin Thomas, 1877.
- A. W. Dobbie Rough notes of a traveller : taken in England, Scotland, France, Holland, Belgium, Switzerland, Italy, Germany, Austria, Greece, Egypt, Ceylon and elsewhere London : Simpkin Marshall, Hamilton, Kent, 1890.
