= Goodwill =

Goodwill or good will may refer to:

- Goodwill (accounting), the value of a business entity not directly attributable to its assets and liabilities
- Goodwill ambassador, occupation or title of a person that advocates a cause
- Goodwill Games, a former international sports competition (1986–2000)
- Goodwill Industries, a non-profit organization
- Goodwill tour, a tour by someone or something famous to a series of places
- The Goodwill, a post-hardcore band from Long Island, New York formed in 2001
- USS Goodwill (1917), a United States Navy patrol boat in commission from 1917 or 1918 until the end of 1918

== People with the name ==
- Goodwill Zwelithini kaBhekuzulu, the former king of the Zulu nation
- Tommy Goodwill (1894–1916), English footballer

== Places ==
- Goodwill, a Free Village in Saint James Parish, Jamaica
- Goodwill, a suburb of Roseau, Dominica
- Goodwill, Maryland, United States
- Goodwill, West Virginia, United States

== See also ==
- Good Will Hunting, a 1997 film directed by Gus Van Sant
- People of good will, a phrase used to refer to the good, in theology and in the vernacular
- Social capital, the goodwill of social groups, in sociology and public health
- Good faith, the mental and moral state of honesty
