= Tommy Goodwill =

English footballer (1894–1916)

Personal information
- Full name: Thomas Goodwill
- Date of birth: 7 September 1894
- Place of birth: Earsdon, England
- Date of death: 1 July 1916 (aged 21)
- Place of death: south of Thiepval, France
- Height: 5 ft 7 in (1.70 m)
- Position: Outside left

Senior career*
Years	Team	Apps	(Gls)
- Bates Cottages
–1913	Seaton Delaval		
1913–1916	Newcastle United	52	(4)
- * Club domestic league appearances and goals

Thomas Goodwill (7 September 1894 – 1 July 1916) was an English professional footballer who played as an outside left in the Football League for Newcastle United. He was described as "a quick mover, he possessed a good cross and shot and delighted the crowd on many an appearance".

== Personal life ==
Prior to becoming a professional footballer, Goodwill worked as a sheave lad at Earsdon Colliery. He served as a private in the Northumberland Fusiliers during the First World War. Goodwill was killed on the first day of the Battle of the Somme, during the third wave of his battalion's attack south of Thiepval. He is commemorated on the Thiepval Memorial.

== Career statistics ==
Appearances and goals by club, season and competition
Club	Season	League			FA Cup		Total	
Club	Season	Division	Apps	Goals	Apps	Goals	Apps	Goals
Newcastle United	1913–14	First Division	18	2	1	0	19	2
Newcastle United	1914–15	First Division	34	2	7	3	41	5
Career total			52	4	8	3	60	7
