= Arcola, Illinois =

Arcola Okaw
- City
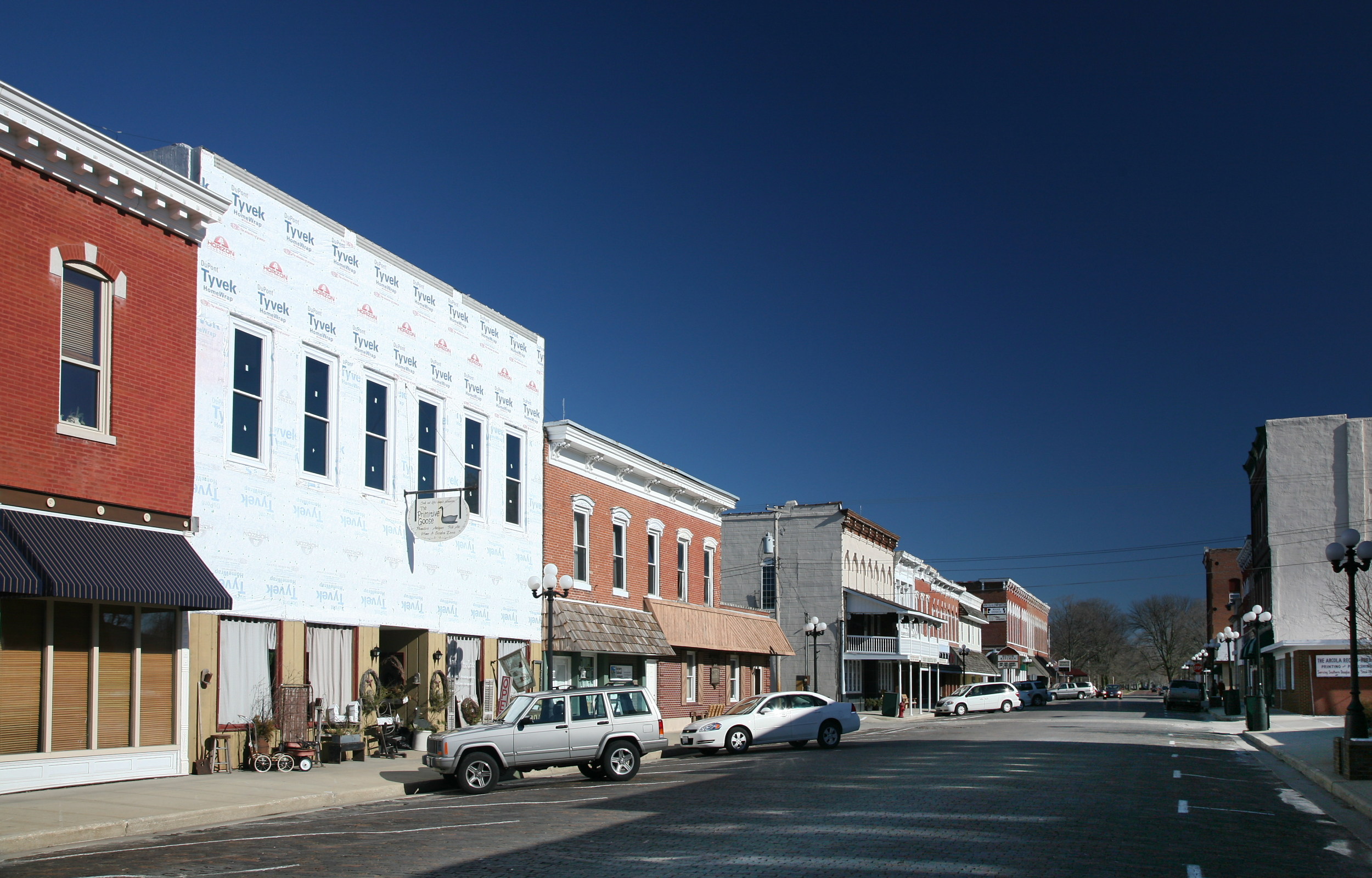
- Main St, Arcola

- Location of Arcola in Douglas County, Illinois
- Coordinates: 39°41′00″N 88°18′05″W
- Country: United States
- State: Illinois
- County: Douglas
- Township: Arcola

Area
  - Total: 2.04 sq mi (5.29 km^{2})
  - Land: 2.02 sq mi (5.24 km^{2})
  - Water: 0.023 sq mi (0.06 km^{2})
- Elevation: 676 ft (206 m)

Population (2020)
  - Total: 2,927
  - Density: 1,446.9/sq mi (558.67/km^{2})
- Time zone: UTC-6 (CST)
  - Summer (DST): UTC-5 (CDT)
- ZIP Code(s): 61910
- Area code(s): 217, 447
- FIPS code: 17-01881
- GNIS ID: 2393978
- Website: http://www.arcolaillinois.org/

Arcola is a city in Douglas County, Illinois, United States. The population was 2,915 at the 2024 census. The city was founded in 1855, when the Illinois Central Railroad was built through the county. The railroad itself was responsible for surveying, platting and founding the town.

== History ==
The city was named Arcola after the town of Arcole, Italy, where the Battle of Arcole took place.

Arcola was the birthplace in 1880 of John Barton Gruelle, or "Johnny" Gruelle, who created Raggedy Ann and Raggedy Andy, the loveable American dolls and storybook characters. He used artistic skills learned from his painter father, Richard Buckner Gruelle, combined with his self-taught writing skills to create stories expressing regional values and aesthetic images. His artistic granddaughter, Joni Gruelle Wannamaker, manages the Raggedy Ann Museum in Arcola.

In 1904 Arcola was one of the towns selected to have a Carnegie Public Library built. The Arcola Carnegie Public Library was finished in 1905 and eventually was listed on the National Register of Historic Places in 2002.

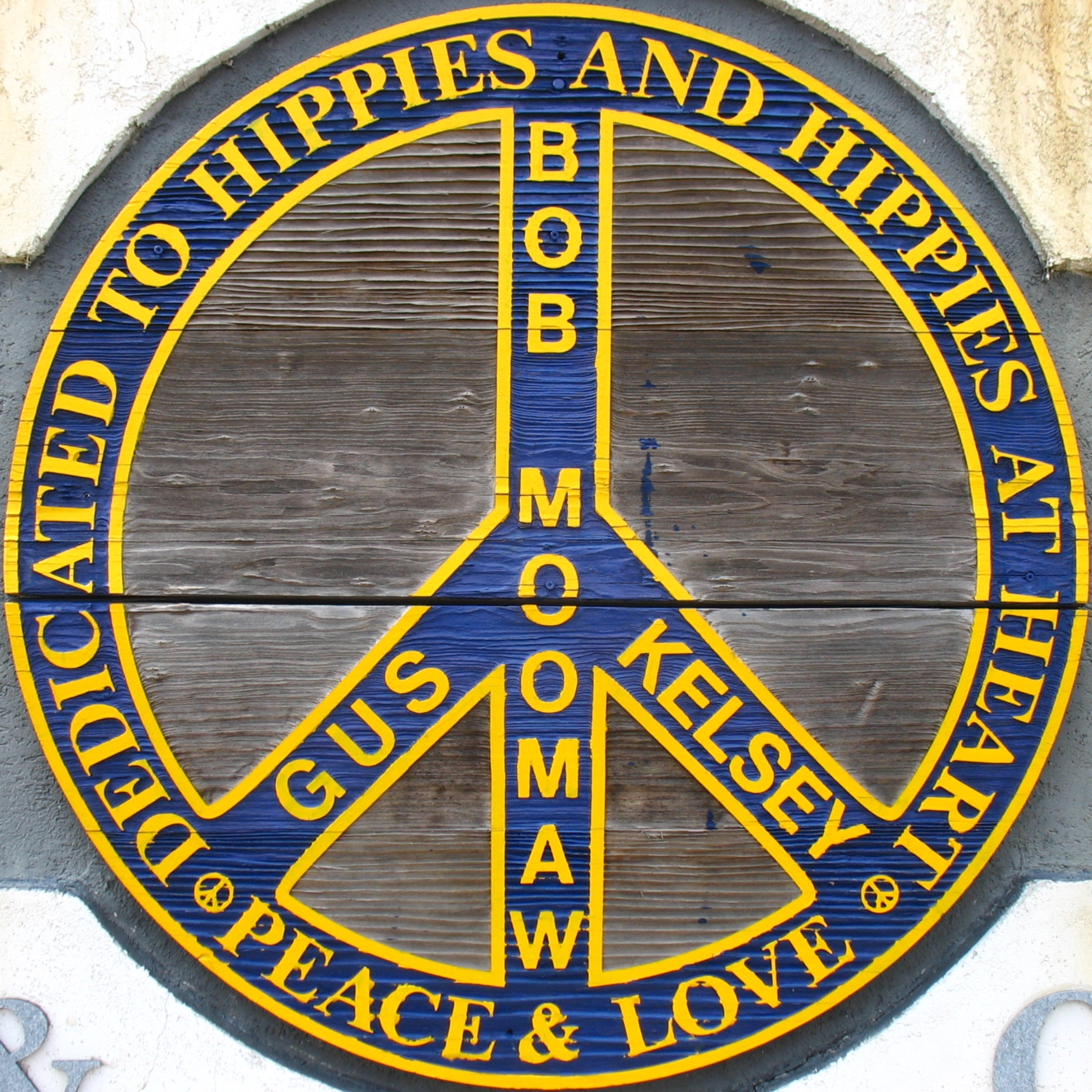
Detail from Bob Moomaw's Hippie Memorial

A nationally known tourist attraction, Rockome Gardens, which featured large formal gardens, concrete fencing and architecture, and many Amish-influenced attractions was located just outside of Arcola. Rockome Gardens was built in 1937 and was operated for nearly 80 years by members of the local Old Order Amish community. In 2015, the Rockome Gardens property was sold to a local developer and has since been converted into Aikman Wildlife Adventure, a drive-through wildlife park which officially launched in 2016.

Arcola is also known for housing the world's only Hippie Memorial, created by Bob Moomaw, who died in 1998. He worked as a railroad clerk and tax assessor, but did not like either job. As an eccentric, independent artist with strong beliefs, he was able to give voice to his feelings, passions and opinions through his art and the writing on the sides of his buildings. He created the 62-foot-long artwork starting in 1992 to say something about his life and the era during which he lived. A nearby marker gives an interpretation of his work.

In the countryside surrounding nearby Arthur, Illinois, is a prominent community of Old Order Amish, the largest in Illinois. Amish farms occupy much of the farmland west of Arcola, with the highest concentration of Amish businesses around Arthur and the unincorporated communities of Chesterville, Bourbon, and Cadwell. Arcola is home to the Illinois Amish Interpretive Center. The Old Order Amish Museum opened in 1996 and features exhibits on most aspects of Amish life, as well as an introductory video about the Central Illinois Amish. Through the museum, tours can be scheduled of the Amish countryside, Amish homes, farms, and businesses; meals in Amish homes can be scheduled as well.

Arcola is somewhat known for the Lawn Rangers, a "precision lawn mower drill team" that marches in formation with brooms and lawn mowers while wearing cowboy hats. Every year since 1980, the Lawn Rangers have marched in the Arcola Broom Corn Festival Parade. The event, held the weekend after Labor Day, honors Arcola's position in the late 19th century as a center of broom corn production. The Grand Marshal of the Parade in 1980 was Clayton Moore, famous as the Lone Ranger, and the team was named in his honor. This unique custom was publicized by humor columnist Dave Barry, who marched with the Lawn Rangers in 1995.

In addition, Arcola was also known for Arrol's drug store, which had the names of all of its customers painted on mugs. The store was filmed on CBS's evening news in 1977. In 1984, after Bob Arrol's death, it was purchased and ran for 14 years, before closing down in 1998. The mugs are now stored in the Arcolan chamber of commerce.

Arcola is also home to Libman Company. This mop and broom making company can boast to be the only major cleaning product company that manufactures their mops and brooms in America. The nickname "broomtown" was given to Arcola because William Libman is a major employer of the city employing 600 people.

== Geography ==
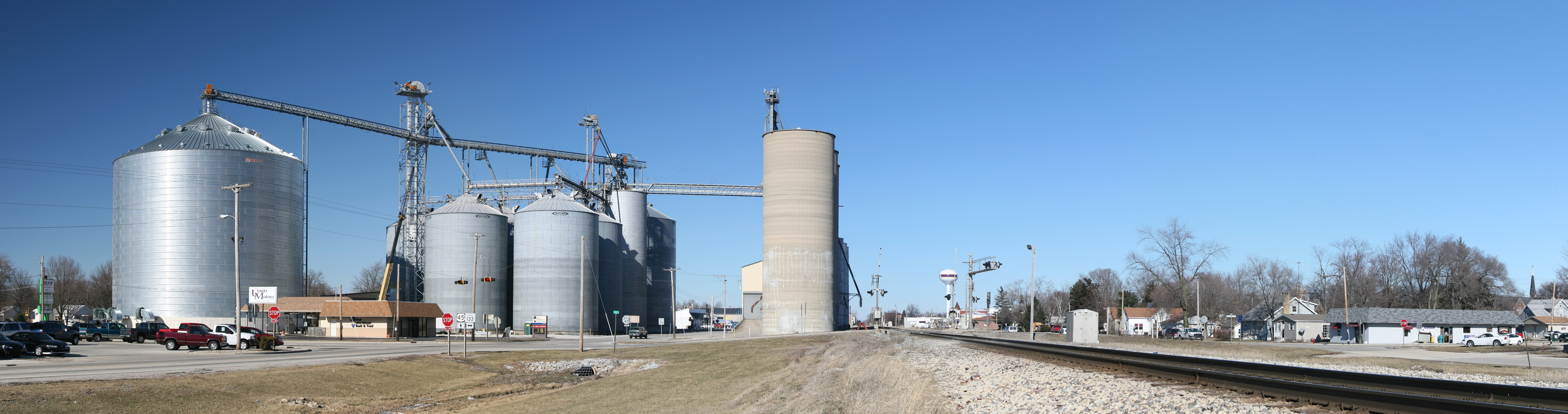
Grain elevators at the intersection of Route 133 and US Route 45

US Route 45 and Illinois Route 133 run through the town.

According to the 2021 census gazetteer files, Arcola has a total area of 2.04 square miles (5.28 km^{2}), of which 2.02 square miles (5.23 km^{2}) (or 98.97%) is land and 0.02 square miles (0.05 km^{2}) (or 1.03%) is water.

== Demographics ==
Historical population
Census	Pop.	Note	%±
1880	1,515		—
1890	1,733		14.4%
1900	1,995		15.1%
1910	2,100		5.3%
1920	1,831		−12.8%
1930	1,686		−7.9%
1940	1,837		9.0%
1950	1,700		−7.5%
1960	2,273		33.7%
1970	2,276		0.1%
1980	2,714		19.2%
1990	2,678		−1.3%
2000	2,652		−1.0%
2010	2,916		10.0%
2020	2,927		0.4%
U.S. Decennial Census

=== 2020 census ===
As of the 2020 census, Arcola had a population of 2,927. The median age was 40.9 years. 24.1% of residents were under the age of 18 and 18.4% were 65 years of age or older. For every 100 females there were 94.2 males, and for every 100 females age 18 and over there were 91.1 males.

0.0% of residents lived in urban areas, while 100.0% lived in rural areas.

There were 1,064 households in Arcola, and 699 families resided in the city. Of all households, 34.0% had children under the age of 18 living in them, 50.8% were married-couple households, 18.4% were households with a male householder and no spouse or partner present, and 25.8% were households with a female householder and no spouse or partner present. About 27.5% of all households were made up of individuals and 11.9% had someone living alone who was 65 years of age or older.

There were 1,168 housing units, of which 8.9% were vacant. The homeowner vacancy rate was 2.1% and the rental vacancy rate was 12.0%. The population density was 1,432.00 inhabitants per square mile (552.90/km^{2}), and there were 1,168 housing units at an average density of 571.43 per square mile (220.63/km^{2}).

Racial composition as of the 2020 census
Race	Number	Percent
White	2,043	69.8%
Black or African American	9	0.3%
American Indian and Alaska Native	18	0.6%
Asian	28	1.0%
Native Hawaiian and Other Pacific Islander	1	0.0%
Some other race	581	19.8%
Two or more races	247	8.4%
Hispanic or Latino (of any race)	1,055	36.0%

=== Income and poverty ===
The median income for a household in the city was $60,720, and the median income for a family was $58,036. Males had a median income of $41,313 versus $27,574 for females. The per capita income for the city was $25,602. About 10.3% of families and 11.0% of the population were below the poverty line, including 15.1% of those under age 18 and 13.8% of those age 65 or over.

== Transportation ==
Dial-A-Ride Public Transportation provides dial-a-ride bus transit service to the city. The nearest passenger rail service is at Mattoon station, where Amtrak operates to Chicago, Carbondale, New Orleans, and other destinations.

=== Highways ===
- Interstate 57
- U.S. Route 45
- Illinois Route 133

== Media ==
=== Radio ===
- 107.9 WDWS-FM (The Rooster), New Country

=== Newspapers ===
- The County Chronicle, weekly newspaper

== Education ==
Arcola is home to Arcola Community Unit School District 306 and Arcola High School.

== Notable people ==
- Joseph Barricklow (1867–1924), Illinois lawyer and state legislator
- Charles L. Craig (1872–1935), New York City Comptroller
- Fred Ewing, American football coach and physician
- Henry Ellsworth Ewing, arachnologists
- Jennie Garth (born 1972), best known for her role as Kelly Taylor in Beverly Hills, 90210
- Johnny Gruelle, (1880–1938) creator of the Raggedy Ann doll
- Ayelish McGarvey, journalist
- Terry Miller, former NFL player
- The Lawn Rangers, a "precision lawn mower drill team" that has participated in parades across the US
- H. M. Wicks, Herbert Moore "Harry" Wicks, founding member of the Communist Party of America

== See also ==
- Arcola Carnegie Public Library
- Libman Company
