= Libman Company =

American cleaning supply manufacturer

The Libman Company
- Company type: Private
- Industry: Manufacturing, Housewares, Consumer Goods
- Founded: 1896; 130 years ago Chicago, Illinois, U.S.
- Founders: William Libman
- Headquarters: Arcola, Illinois, U.S.
- Products: Brooms, Mops, Cleaning Supplies
- Website: The Libman Company

The Libman Company is an American privately held company that manufactures cleaning supplies, such as brooms, mops, toilet brushes, sponges, and various other household cleaning equipment. Libman is a market leader in the traditional cleaning tools segment. The company was established in 1896 in Chicago, Illinois by William Libman and has remained family-owned and operated. Its headquarters is currently located in Arcola, Illinois, where it employs 700 people at its facility. The company is notable for being one of the last-remaining manufacturers of corn brooms, as well as for internally manufacturing their own product components.
