= Simpson (appliance manufacturer) =

Appliance manufacturer

- Founded: 1852; 174 years ago
- Founder: Alfred M. Simpson
- Headquarters: Adelaide, South Australia, Australia
- Area served: Australia and New Zealand
- Products: Washing machines, dryers, dishwashers, ovens, cooktops
- Parent: Electrolux
- Website: www.simpson.com.au

Simpson was a manufacturer of household appliances based in Adelaide, Australia. It later existed as a brand within the Electrolux Australia group.

== History ==
Simpson was founded in 1853 by Alfred M. Simpson (1805–1891) who had migrated from London to South Australia in 1849. Simpson was an innovator and introduced labour-saving machinery and new products such as fire-proof safes, bedsteads, japanned ware, colonial ovens and gas stoves.

In 1963, it merged with Pope Industries Ltd to form Simpson Pope Holdings Limited. Pope was established in Adelaide as Popes Sprinkler and Irrigation Company in 1925. After World War II, it was also a manufacturer of washing machines and hand tools.

Pope later manufactured air-conditioning systems. Simpson was an innovative company which pioneered the “fluid drive” system, which borrowed much of its mechanical design influence from automotive technology. In 1979, the company changed its name to Simpson Holdings Limited—a listed public company.

In 1986, Simpson merged with Email Limited, an industrial conglomerate specialising in refrigeration, electric meters and metals distribution. In 1999, the Email conglomerate was taken over and broken up. The appliance business was acquired by Electrolux in 2000. At this stage, Simpson essentially was outshopped to overseas manufacturing with the famous name “Simpson” applied to its washing machines.

As of 2016, Electrolux was still using the Simpson brand name in Australia and New Zealand for a range of washing machines and dryers. The Pope brand, now owned by Toro Australia, continues to be used for lines of garden watering and sprinkler products. Although Pope was initially known for its washing machines, the brand has now been rationalised to small garden products.

In 2022, Electrolux entirely stopped selling products under the Simpson brand name.

== See also ==
- List of South Australian manufacturing businesses
