= Robert Gibson (businessman) =

Australian businessman

Sir Robert Gibson GBE
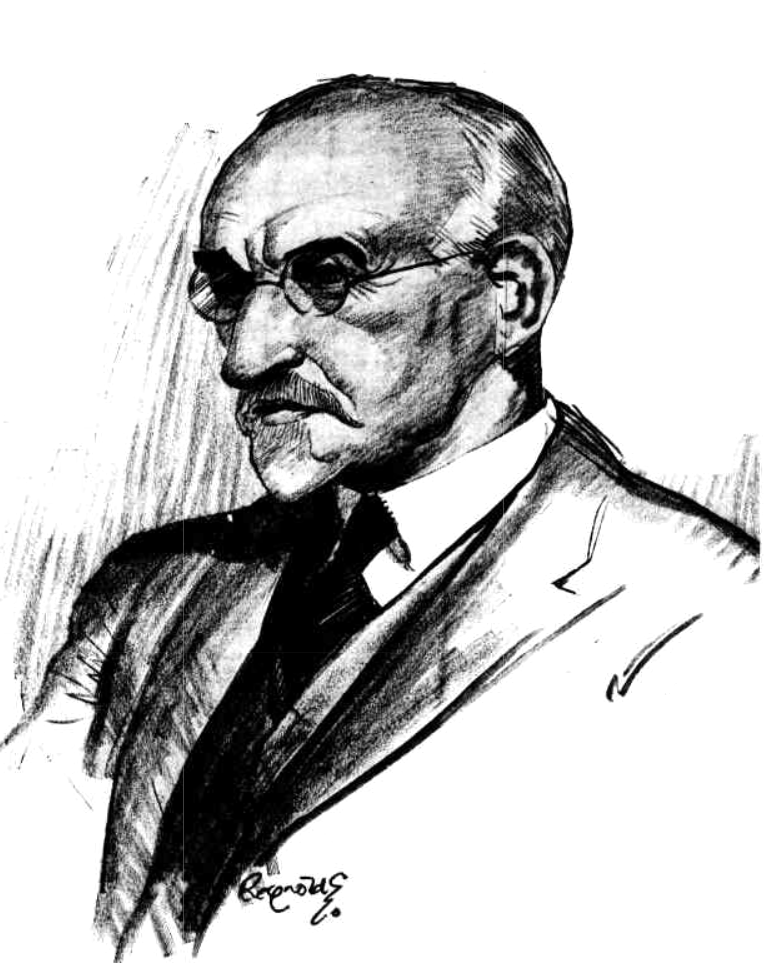
- 1930 portrait by Reynolds
- Born: 4 November 1863; Falkirk, Stirlingshire, Scotland
- Died: 1 January 1934 (aged 70); South Yarra, Victoria, Australia
- Occupation: Businessman

Sir Robert Gibson (4 November 1863 – 1 January 1934) was a Scottish-born Australian businessman who served as president of the Associated Chambers of Manufactures of Australia.

== Early life ==
Gibson was born at Falkirk, Scotland, the third son of John Edward Gibson, metal manufacturer, and his wife Harriette, née Hicks. Gibson was educated at Falkirk High School and joined the Camelon Iron Company.

== Career ==
In 1887 Gibson rejoined the Camelon Iron Company as a designer, and was soon appointed manager of its London office. Gibson married Winifred Moore of Glasgow on 22 March 1890, and sailed to Australia the same day, following two brothers. In 1897, he established the Austral Manufacturing Company.

He was a director of the Union Trustee Company, the National Mutual Life Association, the Chamber of Manufactures Insurance Company, and Robert Harper & Co., and served as a representative of the Commonwealth government regarding Commonwealth Oil Refineries.

Business positions
Preceded by Sir John Garvan	Chairman of the Commonwealth Bank of Australia; 1926 – 1934	Succeeded by Sir Claude Reading
