= Frederick Metters =

Frederick Metters (14 May 1858 – 25 September 1937) was an ironworker, founder of the South Australian company which became Metters Limited, of South Australia, Western Australia and New South Wales, known for domestic and industrial cooking ovens and other cooking equipment, and for windpumps. Two of his brothers earlier founded a similarly named company in Victoria known for domestic and industrial cooking ovens.

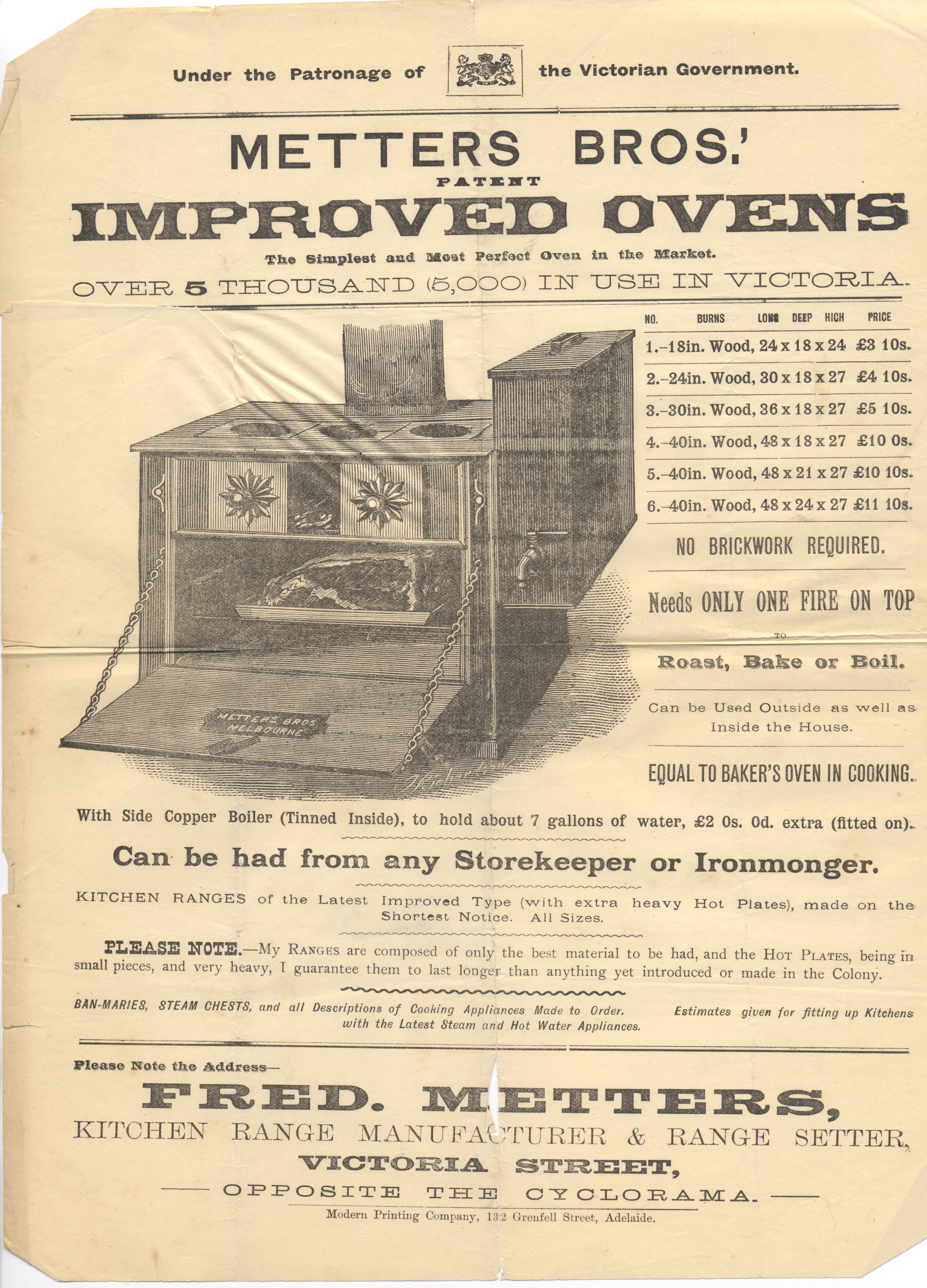
Metters Bros. Ephemera Circa 1890

== History ==
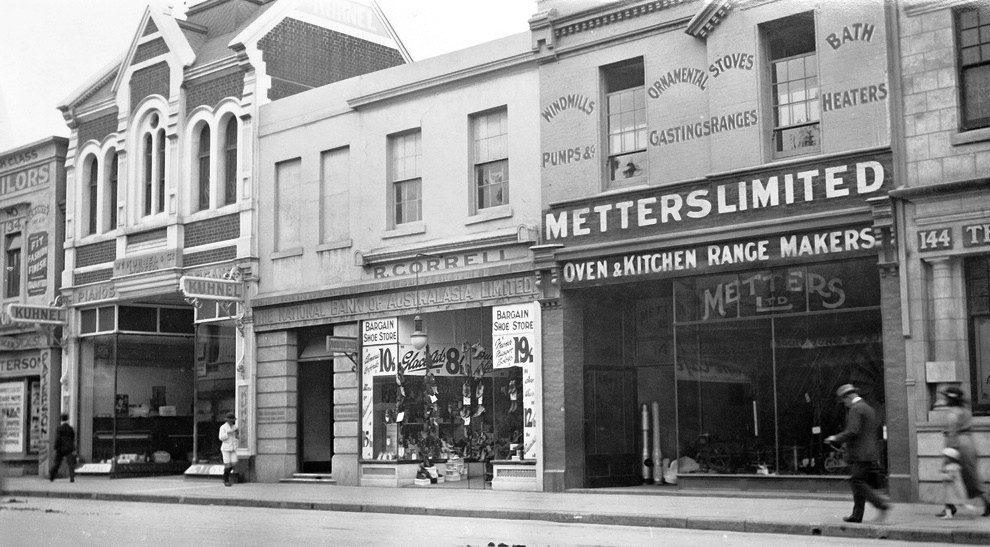
Metters office and showroom Rundle Street, Adelaide

Fred Metters was born in Melbourne the eighth son of James Metters (c. 1821 – 2 October 1881), a bricklayer from Cornwall who specialized in setting ovens and cooking ranges, and his wife Susan Metters, née Flux (c. 1824 – 4 July 1875), from the Isle of Wight, who arrived in Victoria some time before December 1854.

He was associated with his brothers Charles Henry Metters (c. 1853–1929) and John Thomas Metters (c. 1853–1924) who traded as "Metters Bros." of Melbourne. They had business premises at Lonsdale Street east before 1884, at 269 Post Office Place near Swanston Street in 1890, then Elizabeth Street selling stoves and ovens to the Victorian market. By 1890 they were also manufacturing to their own designs on the "Leamington" pattern with their foundry and factory at 83 Buncle Street, North Melbourne. The two brothers dissolved their partnership on 6 October 1910, leaving J. T. Metters as sole proprietor. The company was still manufacturing and trading as "Metters Bros." in 1935.

Fred Metters patented an improved design for wood stoves in South Australia in 1891. He established a factory on Victoria Square around that time, and a factory between Norman Street and Henley Beach Road, West Adelaide before 1894. The "top fire" design had a full-width cast-iron hob directly over the fire, with recessed circular inserts which could be removed when the cook wanted the flames directly onto the base of the pan. Once the fire was properly alight, the upper flue would be closed, so the heat of the flames would be drawn down past the oven and hot-water tank before escaping up the chimney. About 15,000 ovens were sold in South Australia alone. Models included the popular "Metters Improved No. 2", as well as the "Barossa", "Beacon Light", "Bega", "Dover", "New Improved", "Royal" and "Wilga". All patternmaking, casting, finishing, machining, enamelling (only the second factory in the colony after A. Simpson & Son to succeed in this demanding art), sheet metal work and assembly was done "in house". By 1902 some 200 employees in Adelaide and Perth were producing 600 ovens per month.

Western Australia

Metters established a factory in Essex Street, Fremantle, around 1891, and in 1894 took premises in Wellington Street, opposite the Western Australian Government Railways goods shed. Around this time began his association with Henry Langdon Spring (c. 1863 – 21 April 1937), newly arrived from London, whom he later took on as a partner. He established a foundry in Perth before 1907.

New South Wales

In 1902 Metters opened a showroom at 90 Bathurst Street and a factory in Alice Street, Newtown, where stoves were assembled from parts made in Adelaide, but that proved impractical and a foundry was established at Alexandria so their stoves could be manufactured locally. By 1907 Metters had a showroom on George Street, opposite St Andrew's Cathedral, advertising stoves made from locally produced iron. Models manufactured here were "Beacon Light", "Bega", "Canberra", "Capitol", "Crawford", "Dover", "Early Kooka", "Edford", "Empress", "Herald", "Improved", "New Royal", "Newcastle", "Regina", "Royal", "Samson" and "Shearer" wood stoves.

In 1907 a company Metters Limited was founded to take over the assets of the business from Frederick Metters and embarked on an expansion and modernization program.

== Other activities ==
He was one of those who represented Western Australia at the Interstate Tariff Conference in 1900.

In 1908 Metters and his son Frederick Hubert Metters purchased from Burton and J. Snodgrass ( –1913) a sizeable property 30 miles (48 km) above Morgan, South Australia which they named "Murray View", and there built a house and established a substantial grove of oranges, as well as other fruits, Doradillo grapes, peanuts and lucerne. Sometime before 1920 the property was put in the hands of a company, in which F. H. Metters had a substantial interest.
