= Email Limited =

Australian manufacturing company

- Formerly: Electricity Meter & Allied Industries Ltd (1934–1951)
- Industry: Manufacturing
- Predecessors: Electricity Meter Manufacturing Co Pty Ltd; New System Pty Ltd
- Founded: November 30, 1934; 91 years ago in New South Wales

Email Limited was a manufacturing conglomerate operating mainly in Australia, best known for domestic electricity meters and major appliances.

== History ==
The company was formed from the merger of Electricity Meter Manufacturing Co Pty Ltd, established in 1912, and New System Telephones Pty Ltd, established in 1920. The company was incorporated in New South Wales on 30 November 1934 as Electricity Meter & Allied Industries Ltd; it adopted the Email name (an acronym) on 20 October 1951. Email's original and longest running business is the manufacturing of electric, gas and water meters. At one time there would have been few houses in Australia which did not have an Email meter.

In 1946 after World War II, Email obtained the former Orange Small Arms Factory at Orange, New South Wales, which was refitted to manufacture electricity meters, pumps, radio parts and refrigerators, using state of the art technologies and manufacturing concepts. This factory is no longer in operation.

Operations were expanded to include US, New Zealand and Malaysian manufacturing facilities. In the 1980s the company acquired control of several large Australian manufacturing companies including Kelvinator Ltd (1980) (which was a branch of the US-based Kelvinator business), McIlwraith-Davey Industries Ltd (1984), Simpson Holdings Limited (1986), Brownbuilt Ltd (1988) and the steel process and distribution business of Bunge International (1989).

In April 1993 the company announced it would cease manufacturing industrial racking products and commercial/industrial stainless steel products. This led to the closure of the Caringbah plant in NSW and the Coburg plant in Victoria. Appliance production was located at Orange and Adelaide.

In 1994, their petrol bowser, bay loading controller (BLC) and bulk fuel loading rack manufacturing business, Email Electronics (by then known as Email Petroleum Systems), closed its manufacturing factory in Bayswater, Victoria, sold off its circuit board department to former staff, then sold off much of its remaining manufacturing and stock assets before moving to a portable building at the affiliated NVE site in Hallam, Victoria in 1996 where it continued to be asset-stripped and the remaining staff laid off. Their Omega 3000 software product, which controlled the BLC hardware and bulk fuel-loading site access, was sold to Diamond Key International (DKI) which was set up by former Email senior staff around that time. DKI has operated from Rowville, Victoria since then.

== Brands ==
Consumer brands manufactured and sold by Email included:

- Westinghouse
- Dishlex
- Simpson
- Chef
- Metters
- Kelvinator

Some of these brand names were produced under licence from overseas companies.

== Operations ==
The group operated through five distinct groups comprising:

- the major appliances group (now owned by Electrolux)
- the metals distribution group (acquired by Smorgon Steel)
- the building products group (broken up and sold to private equity)
- the industrial products group (broken up and sold to private equity)
- the measurement and control group (now Ampy Email)

== Takeover ==
In 2001 the company was the subject of a complex takeover which resulted in the various components of the business being taken over by different companies. The appliances business was taken over by Electrolux, and some of the former Simpson manufacturing plants in Adelaide and Orange were closed. Only one plant in Adelaide remains in business.

The takeover of Email Limited was unusual in a number of respects. It took almost a year to finalise, and attracted the attention of the Australian Competition & Consumer Commission (ACCC).

At the time, Smorgon Steel was keen to expand its wholesale steel distribution network and wished to acquire that business from Email. However, the dominant steel business in Australia at that time was BHP Steel. (Note: At the time of the takeover, BHP Steel was the Australian steel-making division of BHP. The BHP Steel businesses were subsequently divested as OneSteel and BlueScope.) Email Limited was a major customer of BHP Steel for its appliance manufacturing business, and also a major wholesale distribution channel for BHP Steel. BHP was not happy about losing Email as a customer, and as a distributor to its smaller rival, Smorgon. BHP bought a 14% stake in Email Limited on the stockmarket to attempt to block the deal. This then caused a fight among the society.

Smorgon was really only interested in acquiring the steel wholesale and distribution business of Email Limited, and planned to on-sell the other businesses. As consideration for the takeover offer to Email Limited shareholders, Smorgon offered an unconventional combination of cash and a security whose eventual value depended on the (unknown) future resale price of the Email businesses that Smorgon did not want to keep. This indeterminate offer did not receive an enthusiastic reaction from stockmarket participants and investors. The Australian Competition and Consumer Commission investigated the deal because of concerns that the removal of the Email steel distribution business would significantly lessen competition in the wholesale steel distribution sector.

Eventually a deal was struck between the ACCC, BHP Steel and Smorgon to alleviate competition concerns, and the takeover went ahead.

The steel distribution business was acquired by Smorgon Steel (itself later merged in 2007 with OneSteel). The electricity and gas metering business was sold to private equity in 2003, and continues to manufacture electricity meters, under the 'Email' brand name, thence 'Ampy Email' (named after their UK metering subsidiary) and finally under the 'Landis+Gyr' name (following the acquisition of the Landis & Gyr metering company). The lock manufacturing business was sold to Assa Abloy of Sweden.

The competition concerns about the limited number of participants in the steel distribution business in Australia were revisited in 2006 and 2007, with the proposed merger of OneSteel and Smorgon Steel. This took more than a year to be completed due to protracted ACCC review.
