= Metters Limited =

Australian manufacturer of wood stoves

Logo from 1937

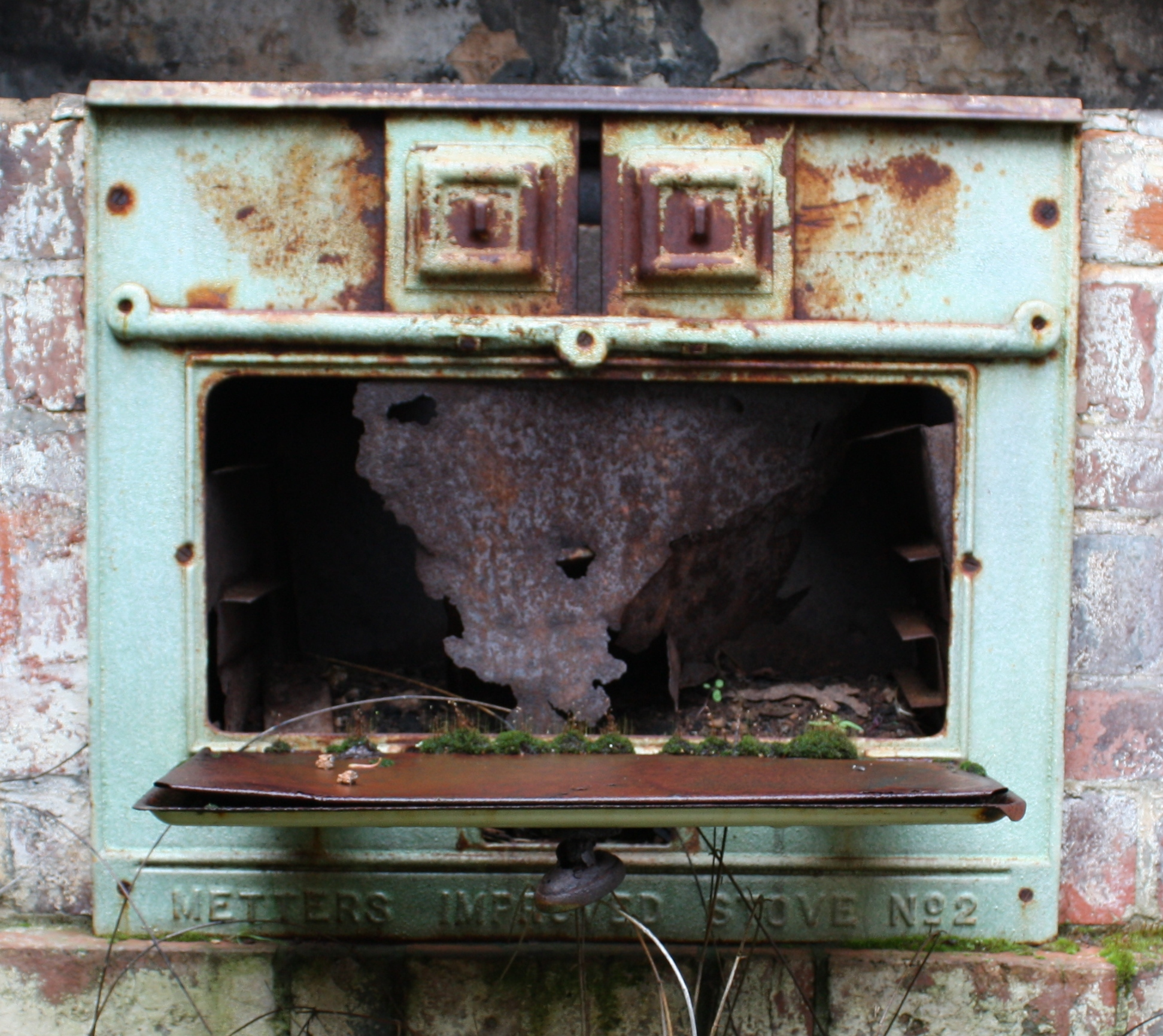
An abandoned Metters Improved Stove No 2. A small fire was built behind the sliding doors at top centre.

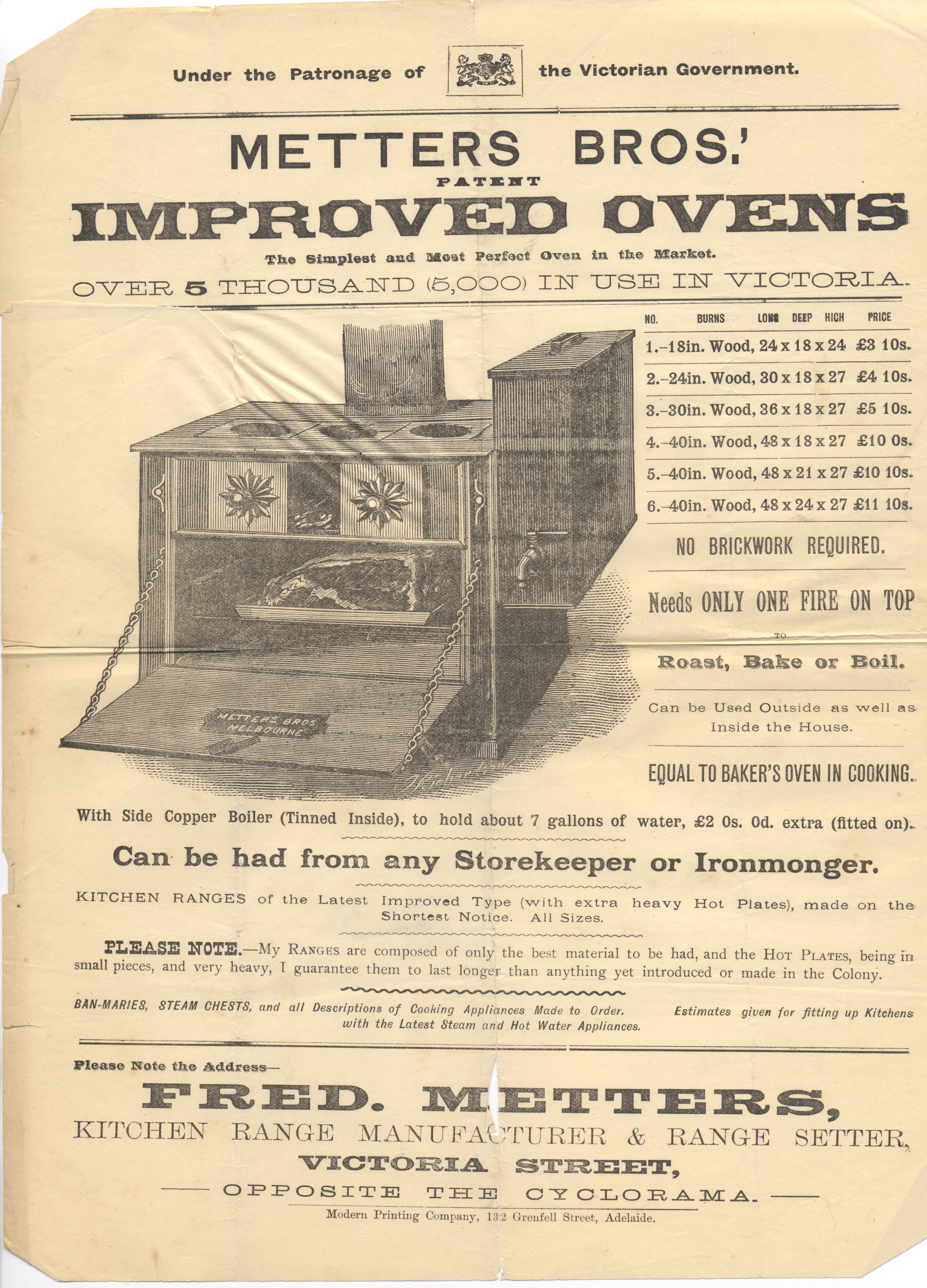
Metters Bros. Ephemera Circa 1890

Metters was a brand of stoves and ovens made by Metters & Company, an Australian company established in Adelaide in 1891 by Frederick Metters (1858–1937), who patented and manufactured a number of kitchen appliances notably the 'top-fire' wood stoves. His brothers Charles Henry Metters (c. 1853–1929) and John Thomas Metters (c. 1853–1924) had earlier founded Metters Bros., making stoves and ovens in Melbourne. Production and distribution of Metters equipment was expanded from Adelaide to Perth, Western Australia, in 1894 where Fred Metters formed a partnership with Henry Spring (1864–1937), and then to Sydney, New South Wales in 1902. Spring bought out his partner in 1907 and founded Metters Limited in 1908 with himself as managing director, and greatly expanded the product range and volume of manufacture in Perth, Adelaide and Sydney.

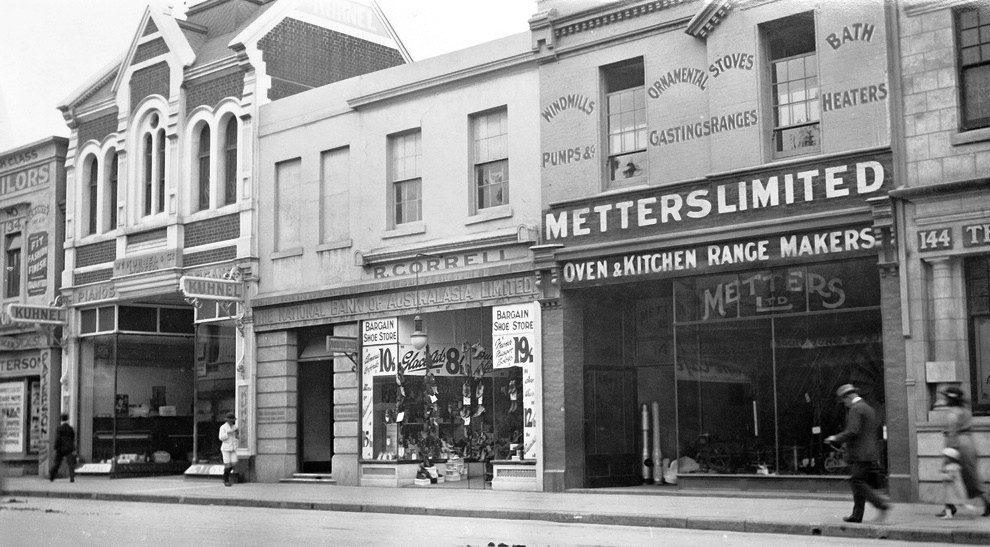
Metters office and showroom Rundle Street, Adelaide, c. 1923

== The Spring years ==
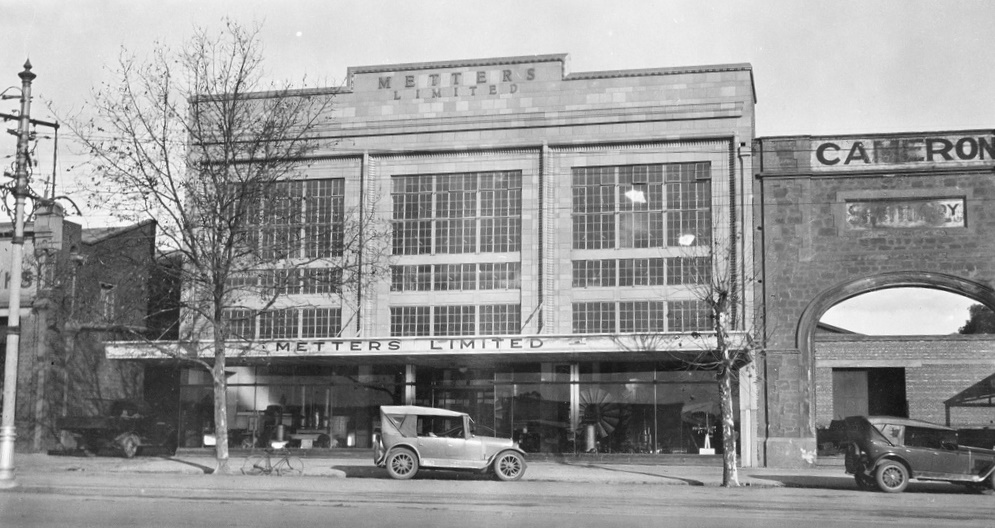
Metters headquarters and showroom, North Terrace, Adelaide, erected 1927

Henry Langdon Spring (c. 1863 – 21 April 1937) was born in London and emigrated to Perth, Western Australia around 1890. In 1894 Fred Metters began his expansion into Western Australia from premises leased by Spring. Metters admitted Spring as a junior partner in what became Metters & Co.

In 1908 Spring founded Metters Ltd. with himself as managing director and a capital of £100,000, to purchase Fred's interest in the company and greatly expanded the business. A factory was purchased in Tasmania, while a branch was established in New Zealand, and another in Brisbane. Headquarters was transferred to Sydney.

In 1911, three employees of Metters Limited, Norman Keysor, Edward Forrest, and Henry Barnett, left to found K.F.B. Foundry, which in 1918 became K.F.B. Ltd., in direct competition to Metters Ltd., and a price war ensued, to the benefit of neither party. In 1927 the two companies merged under a holding company, General Industries, Ltd., with Spring as managing director and chairman of directors and a paid-up capital of £1,077,405. Spring retained control of Metters, Ltd. until his death. Spring's brother Robert, who had been manager of the Sydney branch, then took over as general manager. In 1974 the whole concern was taken over by Email Limited.

== Products ==
The popular 'Metters Improved Stove No 2.' used an enclosed wood fire to heat a hob above and an oven below. Pots and pans could be exposed to direct heat by removing small plates recessed in the cooking surface. Metters also produced a large variety of other wood stoves. The Metters Adelaide foundry manufactured the: 'Beacon Light'; 'New Improved'; 'Barossa'; 'Royal'; 'Dover'; 'Bega'; and 'Wilga' wood stoves. The Metters Sydney foundry manufactured the: 'Beacon Light'; 'Dover; 'Bega'; 'Canberra'; 'Empress'; 'Regina'; 'Herald'; 'Newcastle'; 'Samson'; 'Edford'; 'Capitol'; 'Shearer'; 'Royal'; 'New Royal'; 'Improved'; 'Crawford'; and 'Early Kooka' wood stoves.

Metters Limited introduced the 'Early Kooka' range of gas cooking appliances in 1937. The name of this oven, punning on 'cooker', was emblazoned over the enamelled image of a kookaburra gobbling a worm. Metters Limited was acquired by Email Limited in 1974, which continued to market electric and gas kitchen cookers under the Metters brand name, but was eventually phased-out in the mid-1980s. They also manufactured a range of "Metters" windmills, or more precisely, windpumps.

== Metters Soccer Football Club ==
As part of the local industrial and community-based sports culture, Metters fielded an association football team in Sydney, established in 1923 as the Metters Soccer Football Club. In 1951 it was renamed Canterbury. After winning the prestigious Gardiner Challenge Cup three times between 1935 and 1940, the side claimed three Sydney Metropolitan Championships during the 1940s.

Austrian international Willibald Stejskal played for the side in 1928. Five years later, Metters player Roy Crowhurst became one of Australia’s earliest Socceroos when he toured New Caledonia with the national team.

=== Honours ===
- Sydney Metropolitan Championship: 1940, 1941, 1944
- Gardiner Challenge Cup: 1935, 1938, 1940
  - Runners-up:1936, 1945
