= Dover, Kansas =

Unincorporated community in Shawnee County, Kansas

- Unincorporated community
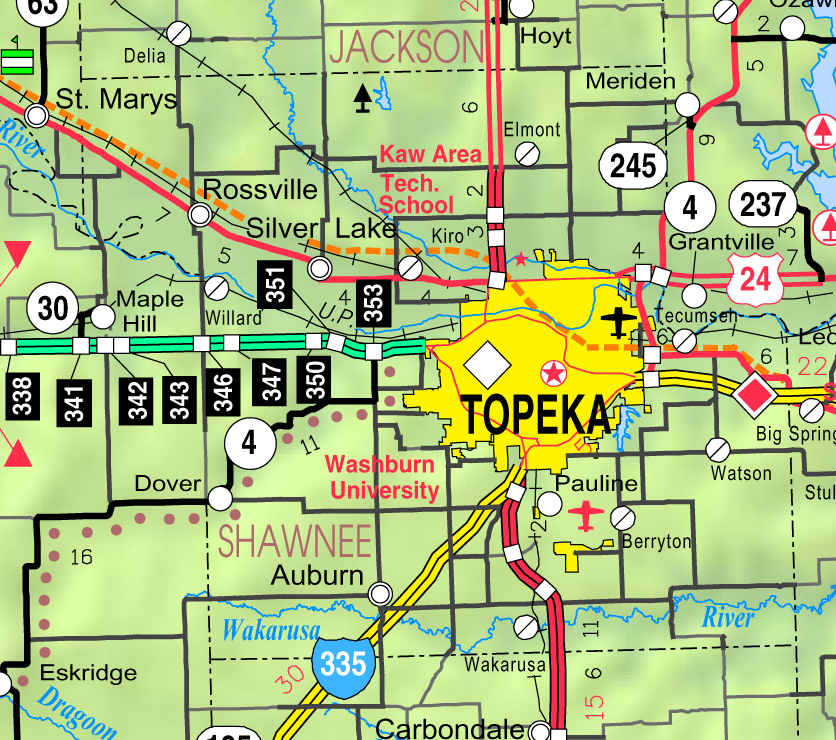
- KDOT map of Shawnee County (legend)

- Location within Kansas Location within the United States
- Coordinates: 38°57′53″N 95°56′15″W
- Country: United States
- State: Kansas
- County: Shawnee
- Founded: 1856
- Named for: Dover, New Hampshire
- Elevation: 1,014 ft (309 m)
- Time zone: UTC-6 (CST)
  - Summer (DST): UTC-5 (CDT)
- ZIP Code: 66420
- Area code: 785
- FIPS code: 20-18450
- GNIS ID: 479043

Dover is an unincorporated community in Shawnee County, Kansas, United States. It is located southwest of Topeka.

== History ==
Settlers came in the year 1856. The Sage and Bassett families in Dover came from Somersetshire, Bristol.

Dover was made a voting precinct of Auburn Township, October 1, 1860, and in the fall of 1867, was erected into a township. E.M. Hewins was the first trustee; Jacob Haskell and George Harden, justices. The first postmaster was Alfred Sage, appointed in 1862, and the family name, Sage, is still widespread in the area today.

The town of Dover was named after Dover, New Hampshire.

During its peak years, Dover had a match factory, a wagon making business, two grist mills, two blacksmiths, an inn and stage coach station, livery stable, general store, three cheese factories. When looking at output figures, two of the largest cheese factories in the U.S. were in Dover. The stone house cheese factory, built between 1856 and 1865 still stands today. The stone 1878 Sage Inn & Stage Coach Station, and the general store built in 1900 also survive.

=== Southwest Trail and the Sage Inn ===
The Southwest Trail was used as a connection from the Oregon Trail on its route through Topeka to the Santa Fe Trail in Council Grove. Today K-4, Kansas' first paved highway, roughly follows the path of the trail. Along Mission Creek there were only two places where a wagon could ford the creek, one of which was at Dover. An inn was built at this location, which conveniently was also the natural half-way point of the trails two-day journey by horseback. The inn was an ideal stopping point to rest or trade out horses, get a bite to eat, and spend the night. Mark and John Sage, are believed to have crafted a stone building for their brother Alfred. Mark, especially, became a well-known stonemason in the area and built many of the stone farm houses, barns and bridges in Shawnee and Wabaunsee Counties in Kansas. The two brothers are also credited for their masonry work on the original Kansas Capitol (east wing) in Topeka from 1866 to 1869. The Sage Inn was built in two stages: The northern half of the current structure dates from 1865 and the southern half was built in 1878, after the Southwestern Stage Company was purchased by Root Brothers of Wichita Transfer Company. Around 1900, the railroad was built to Harveyville instead Dover. This was the clear end of the stagecoach era and the inn and station declined rapidly.

=== Filling station ===
A small Phillips 66 station was built In the late 1920s on the northwestern corner of the K-4 intersection. It later became a Sinclair station. It is now no longer in operation as a filling station, but was once used as the base of the local volunteer fire department. The building was refurbished in the 1990s and today is used as an antiques and gift shop.

=== General store ===
Downtown Dover looking west down modern day 57th Street. Year unknown.

This building was also built by Alfred Sage, and was christened Somerset Hall after his native home, Somersetshire, England. Most usually referred to it as Sage Hall though. The main floor was a general store and the second floor functioned as a community meeting hall.

In 1902, the I.O.O.F. (Oddfellows Lodge) began using the upstairs hall for their meetings, and three years later in 1905, the Oddfellows purchased the building from the Sage family upon Alfred's death. Members have met there monthly for one hundred years.

The first floor has in recent times doubled as a café, and has been operated by a series of owners who do not want to lose the heart of their Dover community.

In the Fall of 2008, Good Morning America ran a competition to determine the "Country's Best Pie." On November 16 it was announced one of the four finalist was Norma Grubb's "Coconut Cream Pie" from the Sommerset Hall Café. On Sunday, November 23 Norma's pie was declared the winner of the competition, determined by a national online vote.

=== Historic people of Dover ===
James Bassett arrived in the area in 1857 from Onondaga County, New York. A native of England, he was born in Glastonbury, January 25, 1836. He was one of the organizers of the Dover State Bank, and was also among those who established the Dover Cemetery. Around the community he was lovingly referred to as "Uncle Jim."

Harvey J. Loomis was born in Wadsworth, Ohio and came to Kansas in 1857. After the civil war he was made postmaster and established his office in the basement of his home. Later he was elected the first county assessor of Wabaunsee County. After serving for many years as township trustee, member of the school board and justice of the peace, was finally sent as representative of Wabaunsee County to the Kansas Legislature. He was a charter member of the Congregational Church at Dover. In 1872 he became a partner of George W. Daily, in a general store business.

Norma Grubb, age 88, was crowned "Pie Queen" by ABC's "Good Morning America" for her Coconut Cream Pie on November 23, 2008. At the time, she claimed to have baked 8,963 pies.

=== Dover Federated Church ===
The Methodist, Baptist, and Congregational churches combined in 1921 to form the Federated Church of Dover, Kansas. The Church was called "federated" after the act of uniting on common agreement. The churches came together on a covenant of eight doctrines of basic, essential Christian faith. A quote in the Topeka Daily Capital attributed to Mr. Tabor described the union in this way, "In essentials, unity; in opinions, liberty; in all things, love."

== Education ==
The community is served by Mission Valley USD 330 public school district. Mission Valley High School was built approximately nine miles southwest of Dover on the geographic center of the three communities. Mission Valley East Grade School (Grades K-8) were also consolidated in 2003 when a new K-8 school was built onto Mission Valley High School.

Dover High School closed in 1970 when the school district consolidated with the towns of Harveyville and Eskridge in nearby Wabaunsee County. The Dover High School mascot was Tigers.
