= Plumb Township, Kansas =

Township in Wabaunsee County, Kansas, U.S.

Plumb Township
- Township
- Location within Wabaunsee County
- Coordinates: 38.800491°N 95.994868°W
- Country: United States
- State: Kansas
- County: Wabaunsee
- Established: 1887

Government
  - Trustee: Mark Potter

Area
  - Total: 49.993 sq mi (129.48 km^{2})
  - Land: 49.743 sq mi (128.83 km^{2})
  - Water: 0.25 sq mi (0.65 km^{2}) 0.50%

Population (2020)
  - Total: 600
  - Density: 12/sq mi (4.7/km^{2})
- Time zone: UTC-6 (CST)
  - Summer (DST): UTC-5 (CDT)
- Area code: 785
- GNIS feature ID: 479426

Plumb Township is a township in Wabaunsee County, Kansas, United States. As of the 2020 census, its population was 600.

== History ==
Plumb Township was established in June 1887 from the eastern part of Wilmington Township. It was the most recent township to be created in Wabaunsee County. Part of the ghost town of Bradford lies within the township.

== Geography ==
Plumb Township covers an area of 49.993 square miles (129.48 km^{2}), 0.5% of it water. The south branch of the Wakarusa River flows through it, as well as Soldier Creek, Coon Creek, Dragoon Creek and Batch Creek.

=== Communities ===
- Harveyville
- Wilmington

=== Adjacent townships ===
Mission Creek Township, Wabaunsee County
| | | north | northeast | Auburn Township, Shawnee County |
| Wilmington Township, Wabaunsee County | west | self | east | Burlingame Township, Osage County |
| | | south | southeast | Dragoon Township, Osage County |
Waterloo Township, Lyon County

== Transportation ==
=== Major highways ===
- I-335 / Kansas Turnpike
- K-31
- K-195

== Demographics ==
As of the 2020 census, the township had a population of 600, giving a population density of 12 people per square mile (4.6 people/km^{2}). The racial makeup of the township was 89.8% White, 1.3% Black of African American, 0.8% Asian, 0.3% Native American, 2.7% from some other race, and 5.0% from two or more races. Hispanics or Latinos of any race were 4.0% of the population.

The 2020–2024 American Community Survey estimated that the township contained 180 households and 223 housing units.
