= Tornado outbreak of May 9–11, 1953 =

United States meteorological event

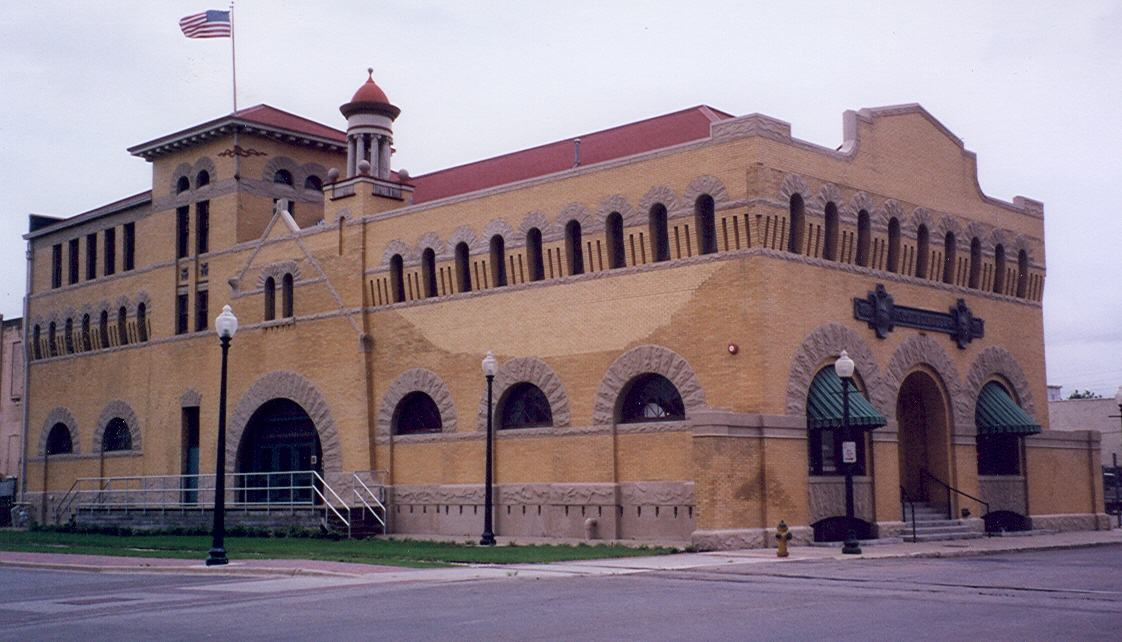
- The Dr Pepper Museum in 1999 with lighter-colored bricks showing damage, since repaired, from the F5 tornado on May 11, 1953

Meteorological history
- Duration: May 9–11, 1953

Tornado outbreak
- Tornadoes: 33
- Max. rating: F5 tornado

Overall effects
- Fatalities: 144 fatalities 895 injuries
- Damage: $63.8 million ($768 million in 2025)
- Areas affected: Great Plains, West North Central and East North Central States
- Part of the tornado outbreaks of 1953

A deadly series of at least 33 tornadoes hit at least 10 different U.S. states on May 9–11, 1953. Tornadoes appeared daily from Minnesota in the north to Texas in the south. The strongest and deadliest tornado was a powerful F5 tornado (Note: The Fujita scale was devised under the aegis of scientist T. Theodore Fujita in the early 1970s. Prior to the advent of the scale in 1971, tornadoes in the United States were officially unrated. While the Fujita scale has been superseded by the Enhanced Fujita scale in the U.S. since February 1, 2007, Canada utilized the old scale until April 1, 2013; nations elsewhere, like the United Kingdom, apply other classifications such as the TORRO scale.) that struck Waco, Texas on May 11, causing 114 of the 144 deaths in the outbreak. Alongside the 1902 Goliad tornado, it was the deadliest tornado in Texas history and is the 11th deadliest tornado in U.S. history. The tornado's winds demolished more than 600 houses, 1,000 other structures, and over 2,000 vehicles. 597 injuries occurred, and many survivors had to wait more than 14 hours for rescue. The destruction dispelled a myth that the geography of the region spared Waco from tornadoes, and along with other deadly tornadoes in 1953, the Waco disaster was a catalyst for advances in understanding the link between tornadoes and radar-detected hook echoes. It also generated support for improved civil defense systems, the formation of weather radar networks, and improved communications between stakeholders such as meteorologists, local officials, and the public.

The Waco tornado was not the only deadly and damaging tornado in the outbreak sequence. On the same day as the Waco disaster, a high-end F4 tornado struck the Texas city of San Angelo, causing catastrophic damage, killing 13 people, and injuring more than 150. The tornado swept away numerous homes and damaged a school, but students inside escaped without serious injuries. On May 9, a long-tracked F3 tornado destroyed a large swath of Hebron, Nebraska and killed five people in the area. The following day, May 10, featured numerous, often long-tracked and intense tornado families across the states of Iowa, Minnesota, and Wisconsin. Two families on nearly parallel paths traveled more than 100 miles (160 km) each and killed a combined total of six people, mostly in Wisconsin. At least one of the tornado families reached F4 intensity in Wisconsin. Two other F4 tornadoes also struck Iowa. Additionally, a relatively moderate tornado of F2 intensity caused significant loss of life in a shack in Minnesota, killing six people. Although 33 tornadoes were officially registered from May 9–11, others likely occurred but either went undetected or were not officially documented.

== Background ==
After two days of intense tornado activity, May 11, 1953, produced a rich, unstable air mass that moved northward over Texas from the Gulf of Mexico. As of 9:30 a.m. CST (15:30 UTC), thunderstorm activity from the overnight hours persisted, generating residual outflow boundaries. Already, anomalously warm surface temperatures reached the mid-70s °F (mid-20s °C) as far north as a line stretching from Dallas to Austin. Dew points were correspondingly high as well, climbing into the lower 70s °F. (lower 20s °C) As a dry line crossed the warm sector in the afternoon, a layer of cool surface temperatures left by the outflow boundaries locally enhanced low-level wind shear, acting as a mechanism to enable supercell and tornado formation. Winds backed along the outflow boundaries, perhaps aiding the formation of large and violent tornadoes. Due to conducive conditions for severe weather, the U.S. Weather Bureau (later the National Weather Service) Weather Forecast Office in New Orleans issued a tornado alert covering sections of Central and West Texas.

== Confirmed tornadoes ==
Daily statistics
Date	Total	Fujita scale rating						Deaths	Injuries
Date	Total	F0	F1	F2	F3	F4	F5	Deaths	Injuries
May 9	6	0	3	1	2	0	0	5	82
May 10	22	1	10	6	2	3	0	12	57
May 11	5	0	2	1	0	1	1	127	756
Total	33	1	15	8	4	4	1	144	895

=== May 9 event ===
List of confirmed tornadoes – Saturday, May 9, 1953 (Note: All dates are based on the local time zone where the tornado touched down; however, all times are in Coordinated Universal Time for consistency.)
F#	Location	County / Parish	State	Start Coord.	Time (UTC)	Path length	Max. width	Summary
F1	N of Huron	Beadle	SD	44.38°N 98.23°W	0005	1.9 miles (3.1 km)	440 yards (400 m)	A short-lived, weak, but large tornado caused minor damage to several structures, including a hangar at the Huron Regional Airport, a barn, and outbuildings on a farmstead.
F1	WSW of Bryant to SE of Vienna	Clark, Hamlin	SD	44.57°N 97.52°W	0100	6.8 miles (10.9 km)	97 yards (89 m)	A tornado developed near Cherry Lake and headed north-northeastward, producing minimal damage to structures on several farms.
F1	S of McLean	Wayne	NE	42.3°N 97.47°W	0300	1.5 miles (2.4 km)	10 yards (9.1 m)	Only negligible damage occurred as a tornado briefly touched down.
F3	N of Courtland to Western Republic SW of Byron, NE	Republic	KS	39.8°N 97.9°W	0310	13.5 miles (21.7 km)	10 yards (9.1 m)	This tornado may have first developed south of Courtland, causing minor damage to a farm, before redeveloping, possibly as a separate tornado, beyond town. From that point on, it badly damaged 10 farms in Kansas, with lesser damage to others in its path. One of the farmhouses was called "destroyed," along with many sheds and barns. According to Thomas P. Grazulis, the tornado may have entered Nebraska, ending just north of the Kansas–Nebraska border, but its path in Nebraska was overlooked as media mostly covered the Belvidere event. Total losses reached $45,000. One injury may have occurred but was officially unconfirmed.
F3	Belvidere to Milford	Thayer, Fillmore, Saline, Seward	NE	40.25°N 97.57°W	0345	46.9 miles (75.5 km)	880 yards (800 m)	5 deaths – This large, intense, long-tracked, and very damaging tornado struck Belvidere, leveling a significant part of the town. In town, almost 100 structures were beyond repair, including 50 residences and 40 businesses. A church lost its walls and roof, with only its arch left standing, and winds removed the uppermost wing of a school. Two farmhouses outside Belvidere sustained possible F4 damage. Additionally, aircraft and hangars were wrecked. Total losses reached $2.5 million (1953 USD), and 82 injuries were officially reported, though the actual total may have been 80.
F2	NE of Sumner	Dawson	NE	40.97°N 99.47°W	0500	1.5 miles (2.4 km)	10 yards (9.1 m)	A short-lived, but strong tornado wrecked several structures, including a sizeable barn. The tornado was not rated as significant (F2+) by tornado researcher Thomas P. Grazulis.

=== May 10 event ===
List of confirmed tornadoes – Sunday, May 10, 1953
F#	Location	County / Parish	State	Start Coord.	Time (UTC)	Path length	Max. width	Summary
F1	SE of Vinson	Harmon	OK	34.88°N 99.85°W	0700	3.6 miles (5.8 km)	440 yards (400 m)	A weak tornado tracked through areas east of Vinson, damaging small structures, including barns, sheds, and some garages.
F1	NW of Tamora	Seward	NE	40.93°N 97.28°W	0710	0.1 miles (160 m)	10 yards (9.1 m)	
F1	NNE of McQueen	Greer	OK	34.75°N 99.65°W	0715	0.1 miles (160 m)	17 yards (16 m)	A tornado briefly touched down, leveling a chicken coop and a nearby barn.
F1	SW of Mangum	Greer	OK	34.85°N 99.53°W	0715	0.1 miles (0.16 km)	17 yards (16 m)	Brief tornado with the appearance of a dust devil caused a frail shed to collapse and caused minor structural damage nearby.
F1	N of Thomas	Custer	OK	35.78°N 98.75°W	0720	0.1 miles (160 m)	10 yards (9.1 m)	One barn was blown down.
F1	E of Mt. Hope to Southwestern Wichita to Udall	Sumner, Ness	KS	37.87°N 97.6°W	0800	42.5 miles (68.4 km)	10 yards (9.1 m)	Long-tracked tornado hit Southwestern Wichita with no casualties reported.
F2	NNE of Renfrow, OK to Udall, KS	Grant (OK), Sumner (KS), Ness (KS)	OK, KS	36.98°N 97.62°W	0900	38.8 miles (62.4 km)	10 yards (9.1 m)	An intermittent tornado produced a skipping swath of damage from south of Caldwell, Kansas to Udall. It struck 13 farmsteads, but produced only low-end F2 damage to some of them. The event may have been a family of two or more tornadoes, as eyewitnesses reported multiple funnels on the ground. Additionally, a related but unconfirmed tornado may have caused damage to a farm in Butler County, Kansas. Total losses reached $30,000 (1953 USD), and one person may have been injured, but was not officially counted.
F3	Elmdale to Northwestern Eskridge S of Keene	Chase, Morris, Lyon, Wabaunsee	KS	38.35°N 96.67°W	1000	52.2 miles (84.0 km)	10 yards (9.1 m)	This intense tornado first caused minor damage to roofing material near Cottonwood Falls. Later, the tornado further damaged farm equipment, trees, and numerous structures. After briefly lifting or dissipating, the tornado or tornado family damaged or destroyed 14 cabins near Lake Kahola. In the Bushong area, the tornado affected three farms before weakening again. The last damage, apparently minimal, occurred near Harveyville. The tornado was not rated as significant (F2+) by Grazulis.
F1	N of Cambridge	Cowley, Elk	KS	37.33°N 96.67°W	1030	6.9 miles (11.1 km)	440 yards (400 m)	A weak, but large tornado downed fences and caused minimal damage to a few farms in its path. A rural barn was among damaged structures.
F1	Eastern Bassett	Allen	KS	37.9°N 95.4°W	1130	0.5 miles (0.80 km)	200 yards (180 m)	A brief tornado struck the eastern side of Bassett, damaging power lines, trees, and roofs in town. Winds downed a couple of sheds and a garage as well.
F1	NE of Humboldt	Richardson	NE	40.18°N 95.93°W	1200	9.7 miles (15.6 km)	10 yards (9.1 m)	Many structures lost their roofs.
F2	Russellville	Pope	AR	35.27°N 93.17°W	1810	2.3 miles (3.7 km)	200 yards (180 m)	Eyewitnesses observed twin tornadoes, moving parallel to each other, that combined into one narrow funnel and struck Russellville. Several structures sustained modest damage, and a movable roller rink was wrecked. The tornado was not rated as significant (F2+) by Grazulis.
F0	S of Nebraska City	Otoe	NE	40.63°N 95.87°W	1930	0.1 miles (160 m)	33 yards (30 m)	Brief tornado touched down north-northeast of Paul.
F1	E of Dent	Texas	MO	37.55°N 91.92°W	2000	0.2 miles (320 m)	10 yards (9.1 m)	A brief tornado struck just southeast of Kinderpost, near Licking, leveling a very large barn. While officially rated F1, the tornado was assigned an F2 rating by Grazulis.
F4	NW of Millerton to SSW of Russell	Wayne, Lucas	IA	40.87°N 93.33°W	2115	6.4 miles (10.3 km)	10 yards (9.1 m)	A large and violent tornado, the first of the outbreak sequence, produced low-end F4 damage to a farmhouse, dispersing the debris a short distance from the foundation.
F2	NW of Clontarf to Cyrus	Pope	MN	45.42°N 95.75°W	2155	17 miles (27 km)	440 yards (400 m)	A strong tornado, producing sporadic damage, struck 35 farms in its path, completely destroying a couple of them. Barns and outbuildings were leveled, and trees, power lines, and utility poles were downed.
F4	ESE of Garner to SSW of Silver Lake	Hancock, Cerro Gordo, Worth	IA	43.07°N 93.52°W	2210	26.6 miles (42.8 km)	10 yards (9.1 m)	A long-lived, large and violent tornado tracked through several farms, damaging or destroying about 30 homes. Roughly 200 other structures on farms were likewise impacted. One farm lost all its buildings, with only the main house left standing. Of the three injuries, two were critical, both to a couple near Ventura.
F2	ESE of Haven	Tama	IA	41.88°N 92.45°W	2230	0.1 miles (0.16 km)	33 yards (30 m)	This brief but strong tornado leveled an entire farm, including outbuildings and barns on the property. The tornado or a related but separate event may have caused additional damage near Independence, leading to a total path length of 10 miles (16 km) or even longer.
F2	Hollandale to SW of Blooming Prairie	Freeborn	MN	43.75°N 93.2°W	2300	6.9 miles (11.1 km)	67 yards (61 m)	6 deaths – This tornado was of moderate intensity, narrow, and relatively short-tracked, yet was one of the most devastating of the tornado outbreak sequence. Shortly after formation, it struck a big shack, which was hurled from its foundation. Six occupants—two parents, their four children, and two relatives—died in the destruction of the shack, which housed migrant workers. Afterward, the tornado leveled another small residence and mildly damaged 10 nearby structures. In all, the tornado leveled three homes, four barns, and numerous outbuildings on six farms, mainly near Hollandale and Maple Island. Total losses reached $35,000 (1953 USD), and three people were injured.
F4	SW of Chester, IA, to St. Charles, MN ESE of Catawba, WI	Howard (IA), Fillmore (MN), Olmsted (MN), Winona (MN), Buffalo (WI), Trempealeau (WI), Eau Claire (WI), Chippewa (WI), Taylor (WI), Price (WI)	IA, MN, WI	43.45°N 92.4°W	2330	162 miles (261 km)	100 yards (91 m)	2 deaths – See section on this tornado – 24 people were injured, though Grazulis listed an unofficial total of 17.
F3	ESE of Farmersburg to NE of Beulah	Clayton	IA	42.95°N 91.33°W	0000	6.6 miles (10.6 km)	400 yards (370 m)	An intense tornado severely affected eight farms in its path, demolishing barns and silos. Livestock suffered significant losses, with 60 or more head of cattle dead. A farmer reportedly sustained non-critical injuries after being tossed for 700 feet (213 m), but was not documented in the official injury total. While officially rated F3, the tornado was assigned an F2 rating by Grazulis.
F2	River Falls to Amery E of Gordon	Pierce, St. Croix, Polk, Burnett, Washburn, Douglas	WI	44.83°N 92.67°W	0030	105.7 miles (170.1 km)	100 yards (91 m)	4 deaths – See section on this tornado – 27 people were injured.

=== May 11 event ===
List of confirmed tornadoes – Monday, May 11, 1953
F#	Location	County / Parish	State	Start Coord.	Time (UTC)	Path length	Max. width	Summary
F4	SW of Grape Creek to NNE San Angelo	Tom Green	TX	31.53°N 100.58°W	2015	9.9 miles (15.9 km)	880 yards (800 m)	13 deaths – This was the first of two extremely intense tornadoes to strike Texas on May 11 and was likely spawned by an outflow boundary. After forming west-northwest of San Angelo, the tornado headed east-southeast and struck the north side of the city. There, the tornado caused catastrophic damage to a third of the city. In all, 288 homes were destroyed and about 200 sustained at least some damage. Many of the homes were swept away in a 15-square-block section of the city, and peak damage approached F5 intensity. Additionally, 19 businesses were hit, including the Rocket Drive-In theater, and 172 vehicles were wrecked. The storm struck a school about 15 minutes before students were scheduled for dismissal. The building, which had two stories, lost its roof and many walls, but students sheltered safely in interior hallways, and only 12 were injured, none critically, though the school sustained $100,000 losses (1953 USD). Total contemporary damages reached $3.4 million, and 159 injuries occurred.
F1	W of McAlester	Pittsburg	OK	34.93°N 95.8°W	2100	0.1 miles (160 m)	10 yards (9.1 m)	A brief tornado passed near Lake Talawanda, downing trees but causing no structural damage.
F5	NNW of Lorena to Waco to W of Axtell	McLennan	TX	31.55°N 97.15°W	2210	20.9 miles (33.6 km)	583 yards (533 m)	114 deaths – See section on this tornado – Tied with the 1902 Goliad tornado as the deadliest on record in Texas. 597 injuries were reported.
F1	NE of Wynnewood	Garvin	OK	34.67°N 97.15°W	2230	2 miles (3.2 km)	33 yards (30 m)	Very little damage occurred as a tornado mostly affected uninhabited areas.
F2	Jewett to W of Corinth	Leon	TX	31.32°N 96.22°W	0030	9.5 miles (15.3 km)	267 yards (244 m)	A possible tornado family produced spotty damage as it tracked to the northeast. Near Jewett, a brief touchdown resulted in damage to 19 structures, including 12 homes, one of which was beyond repair. Other possible touchdowns, though officially unconfirmed, occurred near Oakwood, Tucker, and Palestine. Yet another possible tornado struck Neches, tearing the roof from a home. Three injuries may have occurred along the path. Total damage, including agricultural, in 1953 dollars was $48,000, but may have reached $100,000.

=== Chester, Iowa/Wykoff–St. Charles, Minnesota/Cochrane–Catawba, Wisconsin ===
Chester, Iowa/Wykoff-St. Charles/River Falls–Amery–Minong, Wisconsin
F4 tornado
- on the Fujita scale

Overall effects
- Casualties: 2 fatalities, 24 injuries

This destructive, large and violent, and extremely long-tracked tornado family likely contained at least five distinct tornadoes, spawned by one supercell. The first tornado in the series, though officially unconfirmed, may have formed near Greene in Butler County, Iowa, causing significant destruction on a farmstead. Continuous damage resumed near Chester, severely affecting 11 farms south of the Minnesota–Iowa border, with two injuries in Iowa. The storm then crossed into southern Minnesota, killing one person in a destroyed barn near Wykoff. Near Chatfield, the tornado carried a schoolhouse from its foundation, causing its disintegration. The tornado then hit a few cars halfway between Dover and St. Charles, one of which was carried 100 feet (30 m), injuring four occupants and killing the fifth, a child.

In Minnesota, four other people sustained injuries while inside a barn, and three more injuries were in another automobile; in all, 17 injuries were confirmed in the state. Across Fillmore, Olmsted, and Winona counties in Minnesota, over 24 farms received widespread, often severe damage, including the destruction of most buildings in some cases. The tornado downed many power lines and utility poles as well, and there was widespread loss of livestock. Entering Whitewater State Park, the tornado splintered "hundreds" of trees, and buildings in the park were badly damaged. After destroying a steel bridge near Crystal Spring, the tornado apparently dissipated into straight-line winds, though Grazulis suggested that tornado damage may have continued to Cochrane, Wisconsin.

Reports indicated that the storm crossed the Mississippi River into Wisconsin, where tornado activity definitely resumed northeast of Cochrane and ended near Brownville. As in Minnesota, damage was discontinuous, implying that two or more tornadoes were involved. Between Cochrane and Brownsvulle, the tornado hit roughly 100 farms, at least 20 of which lost buildings, and produced high-end F3 damage to some homes. "Hundreds" of dead livestock littered the landscape. Beyond Brownsville, the tornado(es) likely weakened and reformed into two, perhaps three, others, starting with spotty damage near Gilman. A farmhouse was swept from its foundation, and fragments of the home were lofted for seven miles (11 km). The tornado was reportedly exceptionally large and violent while southeast of Catawba, shortly before dissipation. Five injuries occurred in Wisconsin, though the actual total may have been 12.

Maximum damage intensity was F3 in Iowa and Minnesota and F4 in Wisconsin. The swath of damage between St. Charles and Whitewater State Park, Minnesota, across Olmsted and Winona counties, may have been from a separate thunderstorm, as Grazulis does not count it as part of the same tornado family.

=== River Falls–Amery–Minong, Wisconsin ===
River Falls–Avery–Minong, Wisconsin
F2 tornado
- on the Fujita scale

Overall effects
- Casualties: 4 fatalities, 27 injuries

This was the second of two long-tracked tornado families in Wisconsin on May 10. It first formed on the outskirts of River Falls and tracked to the north-northeast. Here, the tornado demolished a summer house, which collapsed onto occupants, injuring four who had been picnicking but had sought safety during the storm. Initially, multiple tornadoes were likely present, as damage was discontinuous until the tornado(es) passed east of New Richmond. At that point, a continuous swath of significant damage began and continued to near Amery. The first fatality, an elderly female, occurred in St. Croix County when her home was leveled, injuring three other people inside. Farther on, in Polk County, two additional deaths took place: one from flying debris, another in a destroyed barn. In Burnett County, the tornado felled a tree, which hit a dairy building, causing a final death. Beyond Amery, scattered, poorly documented destruction occurred for the remainder of the path. A separate tornado likely formed near Minong and dissipated near Gordon, destroying cabins and other small residences. Six injuries occurred across Washburn and Douglas counties, one of which was severe. There were 11 injuries near Amery and 27 along the entire path. Reports from local staff of the American Red Cross indicated that the tornado family destroyed or damaged 113 homes and affected 215 other structures. Collapsing barns killed livestock inside, though the precise number was undetermined. Numerous trees were downed along the path, and utilities were disrupted. The tornado(es) mostly impacted sparsely populated areas. While officially rated F2, the tornado was assigned an F4 rating by Grazulis, based on damage to homes near Amery.

=== Waco, Texas ===
Waco, Texas
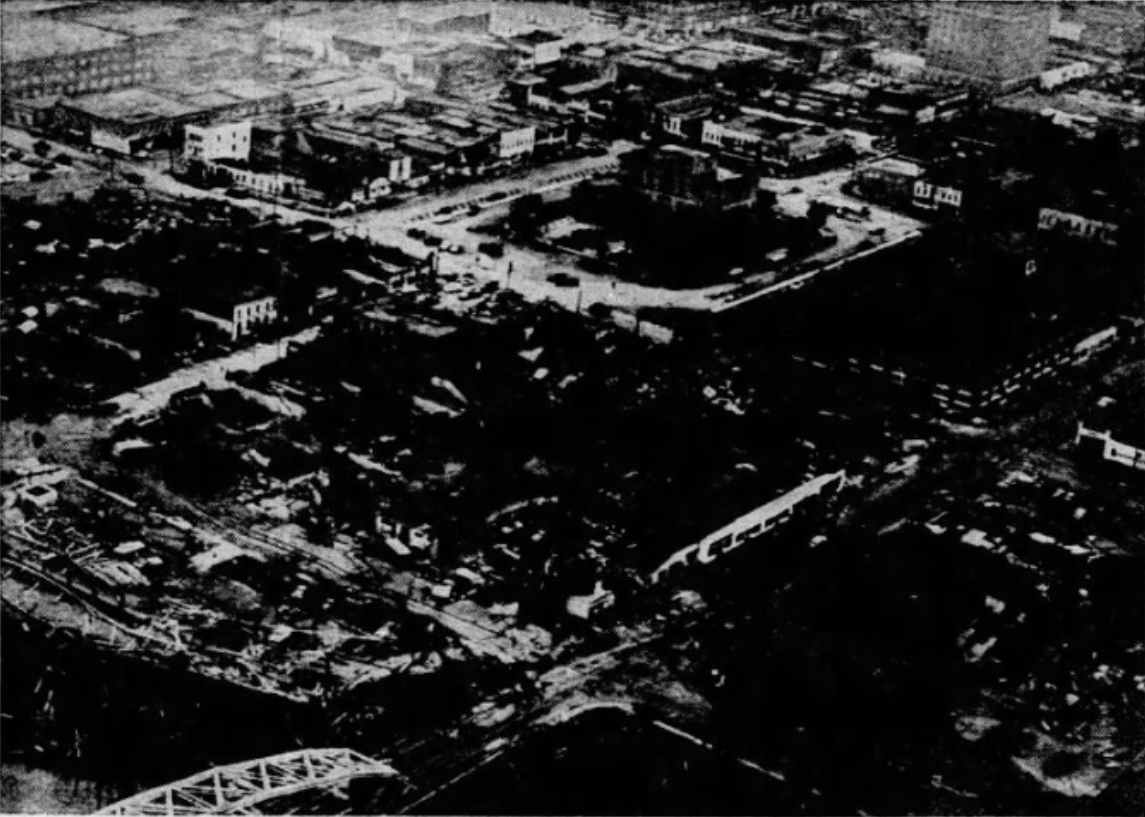
- Damage in Downtown Waco after the tornado

Meteorological history
- Formed: May 11, 1953, 4:10 p.m. CST (22:10 UTC)

F5 tornado
- on the Fujita scale
- Highest winds: >261 mph (420 km/h)

Overall effects
- Fatalities: 114
- Injuries: 597
- Damage: $41 million (1953 USD) (Note: All losses are in 1953 USD unless otherwise noted.) $626 million (2025 USD)
- Areas affected: Lorena, Waco, Bellmead and Axtell, Texas

According to an old legend—attributed without corroboration to the Huaco, a local Native American tribe—tornadoes, or at least severe ones, could not touch down in Waco, a city located in a geological depression. Supposedly due to the bluffs around the Brazos River, tornadoes and other severe weather were relatively rare and mild in the city. This deadly and devastating tornado however, disproved the myth when it tracked directly through downtown Waco at F5 intensity.

The tornado first formed around 4:10 p.m. CST (22:10 UTC) about three miles (5 km) north-northwest of the Lorena community. It quickly began damaging structures, destroying a home near Lorena as it tracked north-northeastward. The tornado produced F5 damage outside of the city of Waco.

As it neared Waco, operators of weather radar at Texas A&M University detected a hook echo in association with the parent supercell. This was one of the first times that radar linked tornadogenesis with hook-echo signatures. However, because heavy rain obscured the tornado, it was largely invisible to people in its path. The high-precipitation nature of the parent storm may have heightened the death toll in Waco by delaying appropriate action. The storm also generated baseball-sized hail in its path. The tornado passed close to Hewitt before entering downtown Waco.

As the thunderstorm began pounding the city with rain, many people on the streets crowded into local buildings for shelter, yet few of the buildings in downtown Waco were constructed sturdily enough to withstand the winds, so they collapsed almost immediately. Thirty people died in the R. T. Dennis building alone. Newer buildings with steel reinforcement, including the 22-story Amicable office building (now called the ALICO Building), weathered the storm. The Dr Pepper bottling plant, today the Dr Pepper Museum, also remained standing but sustained damage. Bricks from the collapsed structures piled up in the street to a depth of five feet (1.5 m). Some survivors were trapped under rubble for 14 or more hours; numerous bodies remained buried beneath piles of rubble and for many days were unaccounted for. After devastating downtown Waco, the tornado continued to the north-northeast and dissipated about five miles (8 km) west of Axtell. While the tornado destroyed homes outside the city, media largely focused on destruction in downtown Waco.

In all, 114 deaths occurred in the Waco area, with 597 injured and over $41 million (1953 USD) in property damage. The tornado destroyed 196 businesses and factories. 150 homes were wrecked. Over 2,000 cars sustained at least some damage.

== Aftermath and records ==
Outbreak death toll (Note: Data derived from the NCEI Storm Events Database.)
State	Total	County	County total
Minnesota	8	Fillmore	1
Minnesota	8	Freeborn	6
Minnesota	8	Olmsted	1
Nebraska	5	Thayer	5
Texas	127	McLennan	114
Texas	127	Tom Green	13
Wisconsin	4	Burnett	1
Wisconsin	4	Polk	2
Wisconsin	4	St. Croix	1
Totals	144		
All deaths were tornado-related

Following the tornado in Waco, attempts to organize disaster relief were stymied by poor organization. Local residents had not expected the tornado and had assumed that the area's geography safeguarded Waco from tornadoes. Initially, the tornado also severed communications between downtown Waco and outlying areas, so assistance was slow to arrive. The chaotic relief efforts eventually spurred greater coordination between civilians and local governments, leading to the development of civil defense. Notably, the Waco event was one of the first instances that proved the effectiveness of radar in tracking tornadogenesis; coincidentally, another such case occurred later in the same year. A retrospective study of the tornado that struck Worcester, Massachusetts, on June 9 revealed that, as at Waco, local radar detected the hook echo that signified the tornado. Researchers concluded that improved communications, coupled with the formation of radar coverage, could lead to accurate tornado warnings, thereby reducing loss of life in future storms. This task proved especially important following the devastating loss of life at Waco and Worcester, along with the June 8 catastrophe at Flint, Michigan, in the same year. The state of Texas supported the implementation of 20 radar facilities, each with a 200-mile-wide (320 km) radius, that proved successful in reducing death tolls in later tornadoes. The system was known as the Texas Radar Tornado Warning Network and also included communications between weather officials, storm spotters, and local officials. Thus the Waco tornado helped catalyze development of a nationwide severe weather warning system.

The Waco tornado remains the eleventh deadliest tornado on record in the United States and is tied with the 1902 Goliad tornado as the deadliest in Texas history.

The storm also intersected with the long legacy of racism against black residents of Waco. After the disaster, some people in the local African-American community saw the tornado as divine retribution for the lynching of Jesse Washington over thirty years prior.

== See also ==
- List of F5 and EF5 tornadoes
- List of North American tornadoes and tornado outbreaks
- List of tornadoes striking downtown areas
- 1922 Austin twin tornadoes
- 1970 Lubbock tornado

== Notes ==
Preceded by St. Louis, MO–East St. Louis, IL (1927)	Costliest U.S. tornadoes on Record; May 11, 1953	Succeeded by Worcester, MA (1953)
