= 1922 Austin twin tornadoes =

Extreme weather event in Austin, Texas, US

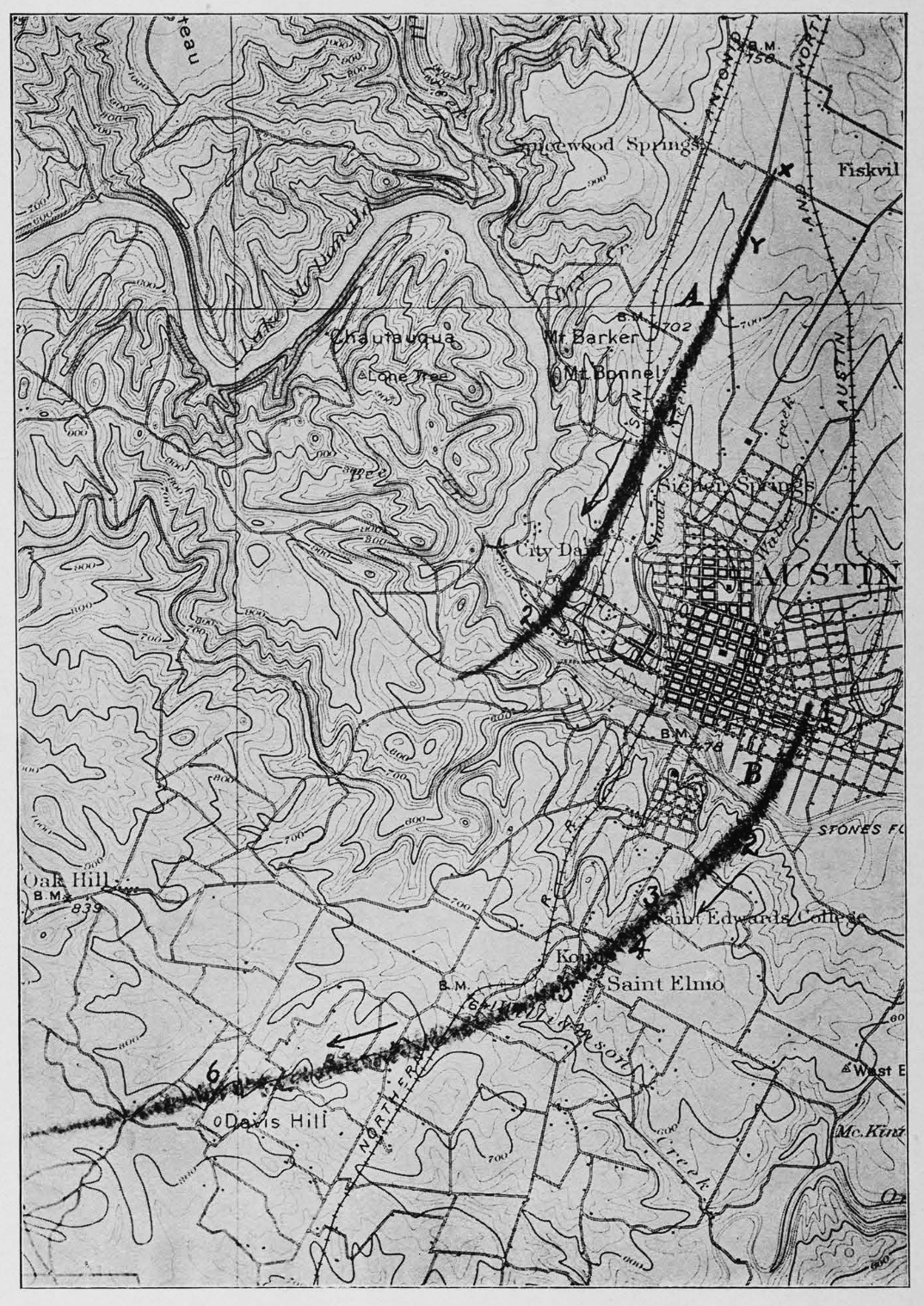
- The paths of the two tornadoes across Austin

Meteorological history
- Duration: May 4, 1922

Tornado outbreak
- Tornadoes: 2
- Max. rating: F4 tornado

Overall effects
- Casualties: 12 fatalities; ≥50 injuries
- Damage: ≥$300,000 (1922 USD) (Note: All monetary values in 1922 United States dollar unless otherwise noted.)
- Areas affected: Austin, Texas, and surrounding communities

On the afternoon of May 4, 1922, two simultaneous tornadoes struck Austin, Texas, taking unusual southwesterly paths through the city and surrounding areas on both sides of the Colorado River. Meteorological details concerning the conditions that led to the event are sparse, though historical accounts described the morning and afternoon as sweltering; clouds began aggregating northeast of Austin by noon and had developed into thunderstorms over the city by around 4:00 p.m. (Note: All times in Central Standard Time unless otherwise noted.) The first tornado began in a rural area 6 mi (9.7 km) northwest of the Texas State Capitol and tracked across the Texas Deaf, Dumb, and Blind Institute for Colored Youth and Deep Eddy, injuring at least five people and causing around $25,000 in damage (equivalent to $481,000 in 2025). The tornado was widely photographed and was estimated to have been an F2 tornado on the Fujita scale.

While the first tornado was inflicting damage, a second tornado touched down near the Texas State Cemetery and moved across the Travis Heights community and St. Edward's University. Its most destructive impacts occurred at the Woodward Manufacturing Company's automobile plant at Penn Field. It then curved west towards Manchaca and Oak Hill, leveling homes and uprooting numerous trees before dissipating. The second tornado was the more destructive of the two and killed at least 12 people, including six at a single home in Oak Hill. It was estimated to have been an F4 tornado on the Fujita scale. In aggregate, the two tornadoes injured 50–60 people and inflicted at least $300,000 (equivalent to $5,800,000 in 2025) in damage, with some estimates placing the damage toll above $700,000 (equivalent to $13,500,000 in 2025).

== Meteorological synopsis ==
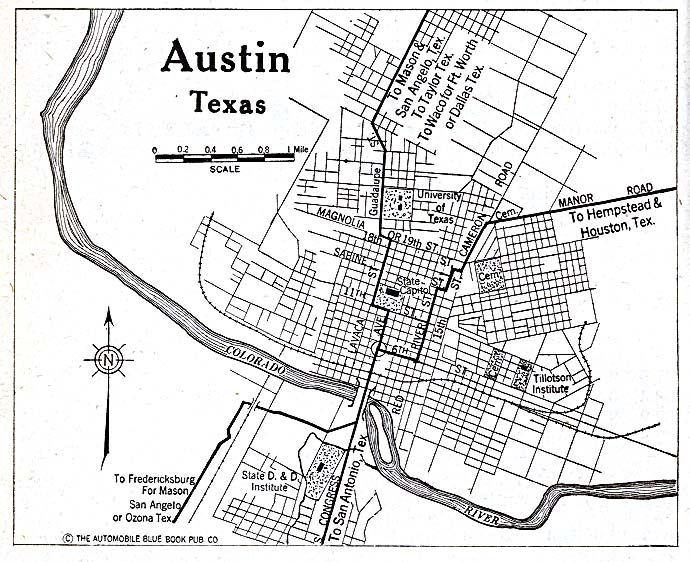
A map of Austin in 1920

Two simultaneous tornadoes struck the Austin, Texas, area on the afternoon of May 4, 1922, inflicting a combined 50–60 injuries. Estimates of the damage toll vary widely. According to one estimate published in the University of Texas Bulletin, the tornadoes caused $300,000–$350,000 in property damage. One estimate in the Weather Bureau's Climatological Data publication indicated a $500,000 damage toll. The Austin American, a local newspaper, tallied a $584,000 toll, while another newspaper, The Austin Statesman, tallied a $725,000 toll. One tornado generally struck areas west of central Austin while the other struck areas east and south of the city; the latter caused all 12–13 fatalities documented on May 4. The tornadoes were 4 mi (6.4 km) apart while on the ground. Both tornadoes took atypical tracks towards the south-southwest. The Austin/San Antonio office of the National Weather Service ranked the event as the second most significant weather event of the 20th century for the Austin area, behind the flooding in 1921. The meteorological details concerning the development and progression of the two tornadoes were primarily documented in two published accounts of the storm, with one authored by Frederic W. Simonds, the chairman of the Department of Geology at the University of Texas, and Fred Morris, a weather observer and employee at the university's mechanical engineering department. The two tornadoes were also widely photographed, though the second, eastern tornado was imaged less. A brief hailstorm with hail "of larger size than a pigeon egg" according to Simonds occurred after the two tornadoes struck, lasting for about 20 minutes before the storms abated prior to sunset. To the north, the town of Taylor was buffeted by strong winds from a concurrent but separate storm. Round Rock and Hutto reported heavy rain during the afternoon but did not otherwise suffer any ill effects. Pflugerville reported small hailstones and rain.

Simonds described May 4, 1922, as an "oppressively warm" day. J.D. Martin, the superintendent at the Texas Deaf, Dumb, and Blind Institute for Colored Youth, described it as the onset of a heatwave shortly before the first tornado struck. Likewise, Morris described the morning as "sultry" with a "very light southeast breeze" in his report published in the May 1922 edition of the Monthly Weather Review. The air pressure on the University of Texas bottomed out at 986 mbar (986 hPa; 29.1 inHg) at 3:20 p.m. Aside from the university barometer, there were no standard surface weather observations as climatological data was only recorded once per day at 7:00 a.m. Weather maps indicated the juxtaposition of drier air west of Austin and moist air from the Gulf of Mexico to the east. Small and nearly stationary cumulus clouds began to form by 11:00 a.m. Some of these clouds to the northeast developed into cumulonimbus clouds by noon and remained stationary until around 2:30 p.m. when they began to move and spread south. After 3:00 p.m., low-level scud clouds began to converge over the Austin area, and at around 3:45 p.m. thunder was heard for the first time. Lightning became more frequent as the thunderstorm intensified.

== Tornadoes ==
=== First tornado ===
First Austin tornado
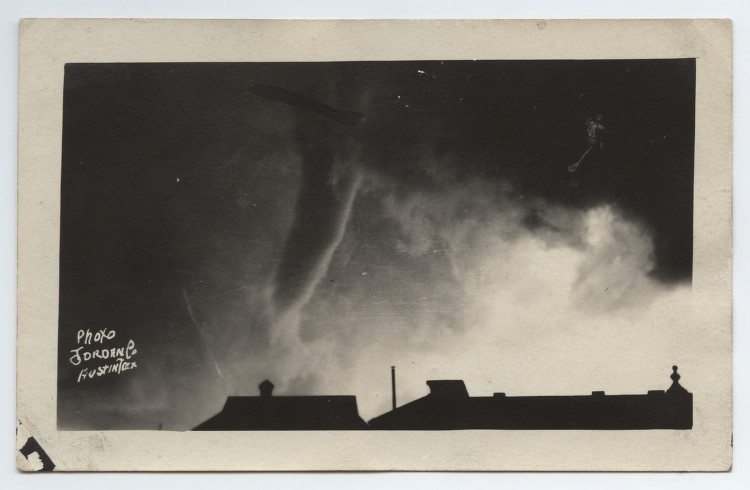
- The first tornado developing over west Austin

Meteorological history
- Date: May 4, 1922

F2 tornado
- on the Fujita scale
- Highest winds: 113–157 mph (182–253 km/h)

Overall effects
- Casualties: 7 injuries
- Damage: ≥$25,000

An account by Paul T. Seashore published in the Monthly Weather Review described the development of the conical funnel cloud that led to the first tornado on the afternoon of May 4:

The approaching clouds were scarcely 5 miles away when I first became aware of the tornadic formative disturbance. In a position nearly due north a ragged edge, or that part which appears to an observer as being the bottom of the cloud had in one place dipped lower and had assumed the shape of a V with a slender thread-like appendage swinging from the bottom.

— Paul T. Seashore, "Some Observations Made on the Origin, Growth, and Disappearance of the Tornado Which Passed West of Austin May 4, 1922", Monthly Weather Review (May 1922)

Simonds notes that a clamor began on the campus of the University of Texas as the funnel cloud began to descend to the northwest. The commotion also led to the mid-game cancelation of a baseball match between the University of Texas and Austin College at Clark Field as well as the suspension of a special meeting of the Austin City Council. The funnel cloud was deflected 45 degrees away from the nadir below its connection with the parent cloud; Simonds believed this was a byproduct of wind currents passing through the rugged topography of the Balcones Escarpment west of Austin. This first tornado touched down in a rural area 5–6 mi (8.0–9.7 km) northwest of the Texas State Capitol and moved south-southwest. It destroyed several homes and caused heavy damage at the Texas Deaf, Dumb, and Blind Institute for Colored Youth, injuring five people. Buildings at the institute were either unroofed or displaced from their foundations; an industrial building, dormitory, laundry building, and smaller sheds were destroyed on the institution grounds.

The tornado then blew down or unroofed cabins near Deep Eddy along the Colorado River and denuded or uprooted trees. This included those on the nearby YMCA and Hardy Johnson campgrounds that were largely destroyed. A segment of roofing ripped away from the institute landed at Deep Eddy after traveling airborne for 3 mi (4.8 km). Two people were injured at Deep Eddy. The tornado then crossed the river and produced a narrow path of damage in unpopulated hills southwest of Austin before dissipating. An analysis of the tornado's damage published by meteorologist Thomas P. Grazulis in 1990 estimated that it was an F2 tornado on the Fujita scale, with a damage toll amounting to around $25,000; The Austin Statesman attributed at least $50,000 in property damage to the tornado, including $40,000 incurred by the Texas Deaf, Dumb, and Blind Institute for Colored Youth. The tornado's path spanned 70 yd (64 m) at its widest and was 9 mi (14 km) long.

=== Second tornado ===
Second Austin tornado
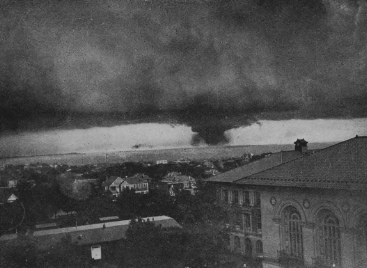
- The second tornado as seen from the Main Building of the University of Texas, looking southwest

Meteorological history
- Date: May 4, 1922

F4 tornado
- on the Fujita scale
- Highest winds: 207–260 mph (333–418 km/h)

Overall effects
- Casualties: 12–13 fatalities, ≥50 injuries
- Damage: ≥$300,000

Morris's account of the second tornado detailed the development of the preceding wall cloud, writing of its "violent churning" and lowering from the broader cloud. This tornado touched down near the Texas State Cemetery on the east side of Austin while the first tornado was in progress and initially moved south-southwest. Trees nearby were uprooted and stripped of their branches while some buildings sustained serious damage: one small home on Navasota Street was torn from its foundation and a Gulf Oil gas station on East Sixth Street was unroofed. The tornado toppled a moonlight tower onto the Tenth Ward Fire Station, damaging the building. Along the Colorado River, small homes, and outbuildings were damaged as the tornado began to cross the river, pulling a column of water 50 ft (15 m) into the air. Waste from a nearby city landfill was also pulled into the river. The tornado then entered the newly built Travis Heights community, where it unroofed houses and uprooted large trees. Three homes were "wrecked" according to The Austin Statesman and four others were damaged. The tornado's impacts were not uniform; in some cases, badly damaged buildings were adjacent to those that showed little evidence of the tornado's passage. At the time, the tornado spanned approximately 50 yd (46 m) across. Additional homes were razed before the tornado moved across the campus of St. Edward's University. The third story of a brick dormitory was destroyed, in addition to the campus power plant and gymnasium. One university student was killed after being thrown 300 yd (270 m) by the tornado. Another four students were injured. Grazulis lists the damage at the university as totaling approximately $200,000. Debris from the tornado's passage over the campus was recovered as far as 55 mi (89 km) away.

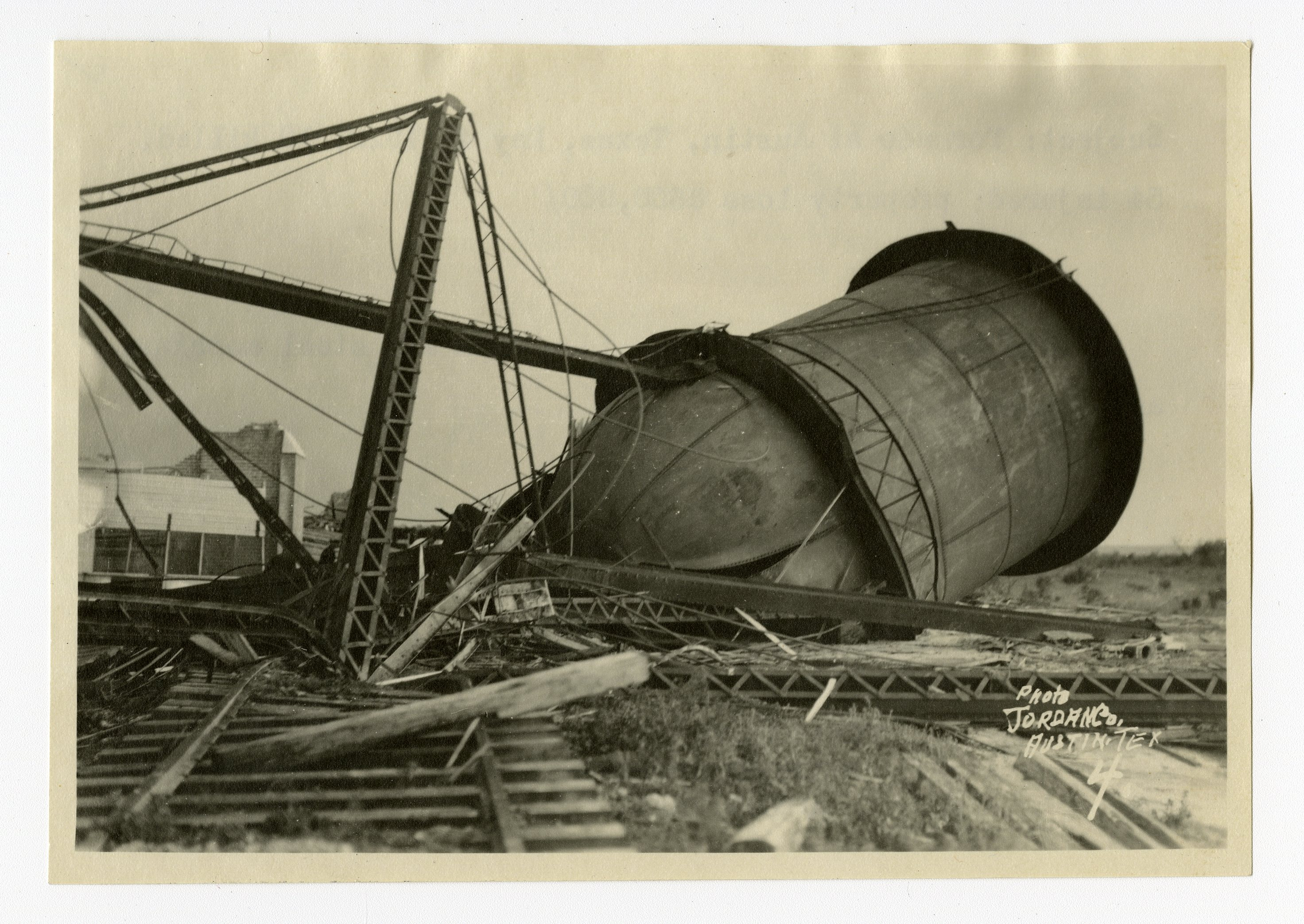
A water tower destroyed by the tornado

The greatest property toll occurred when the tornado tracked over Penn Field, where it destroyed the automobile plant of the Woodward Manufacturing Company; five large brick buildings were demolished and a steel water tower was toppled. Two people were killed there and twenty-eight others were injured. Most of the casualties occurred at the facility's living quarters or planing mill; some were outside watching the tornado as it moved across Travis Heights when they were struck by debris. The Woodward Manufacturing Company assessed $300,000 in losses at the plant. Another person at Penn Field outside of the factory was also killed. Debris from the destruction at Penn Field was lofted over 100 ft (30 m) into the air and was blown onto the busy Post Road connecting Austin with San Antonio, Texas, but caused no loss of life. Additional debris broke through the roof of the St. Elmo schoolhouse; the building itself also moved at least 20 ft (6.1 m) off its foundation. One person was killed in the St. Elmo area, which was reportedly "wiped out" by the tornado. The tornado's path then curved towards the west, destroying a dairy and other buildings. Two cows and a horse at the dairy were killed. It was at this point that the tornado was at its widest, with a diameter of some 225 yd (206 m). Two people were killed northwest of Manchaca. Six people were killed in a single home 2 mi (3.2 km) southeast of Oak Hill; little remained of the home aside from the stones that once comprised its chimney. Other small homes nearby were also leveled. Tornadic damage after this point was largely inflicted upon farms and forests to the southwest, with swaths of fallen timber and debris resulting from the tornado's trek into more forested areas. Grazulis's 1991 assessment of the second tornado's damage estimated that it was an F4 tornado on the Fujita scale. Estimates of the tornado's death and damage toll vary. Press reports and documentation published in the Monthly Weather Review list either 12 or 13 deaths. The May 5, 1922 edition of The Austin Statesman enumerated 13 fatalities and 44 injuries; the following day's edition enumerated 12 fatalities. The injured were sent to three area hospitals.

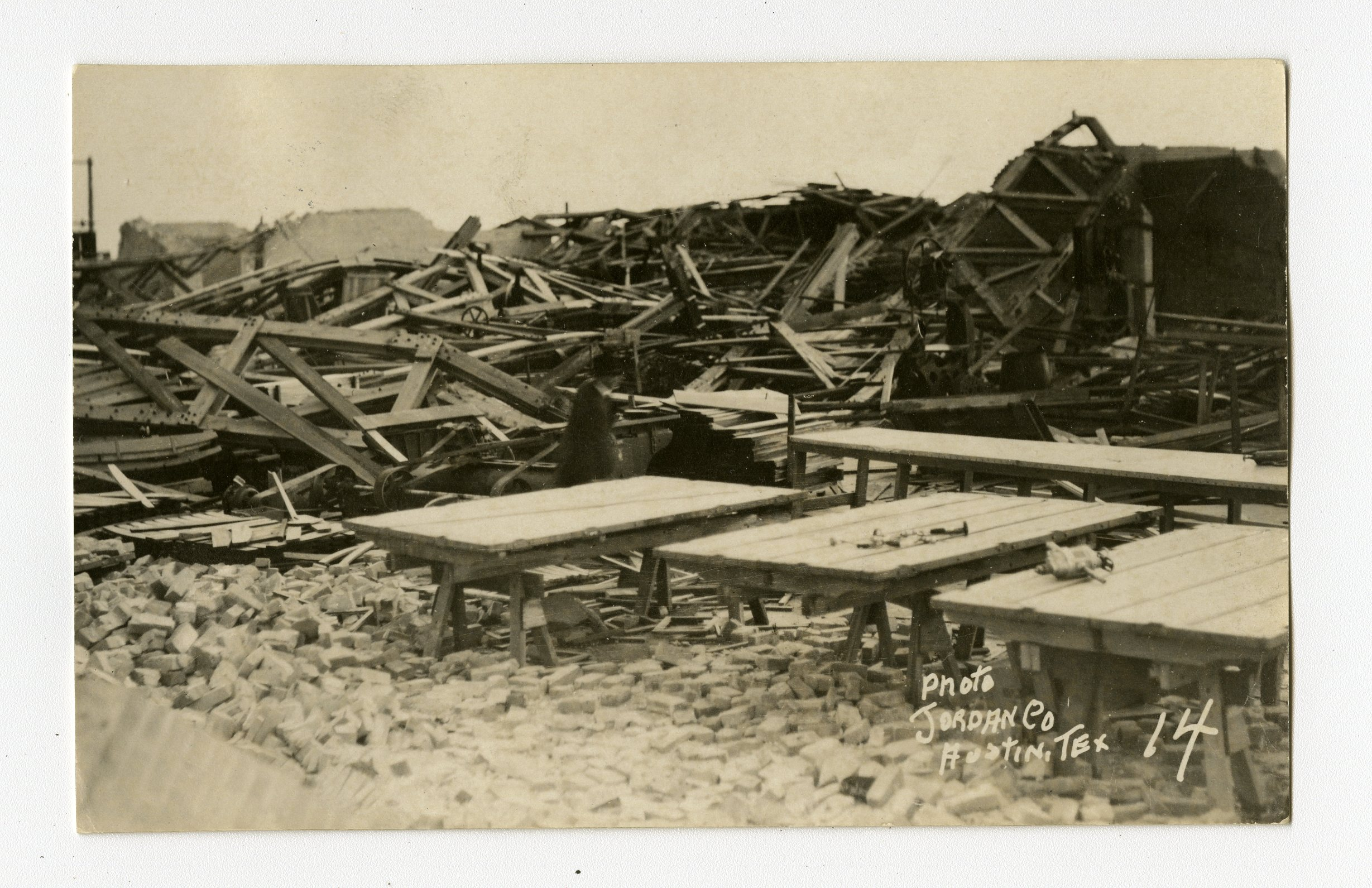
Remains of a woodworking plant where two people were killed

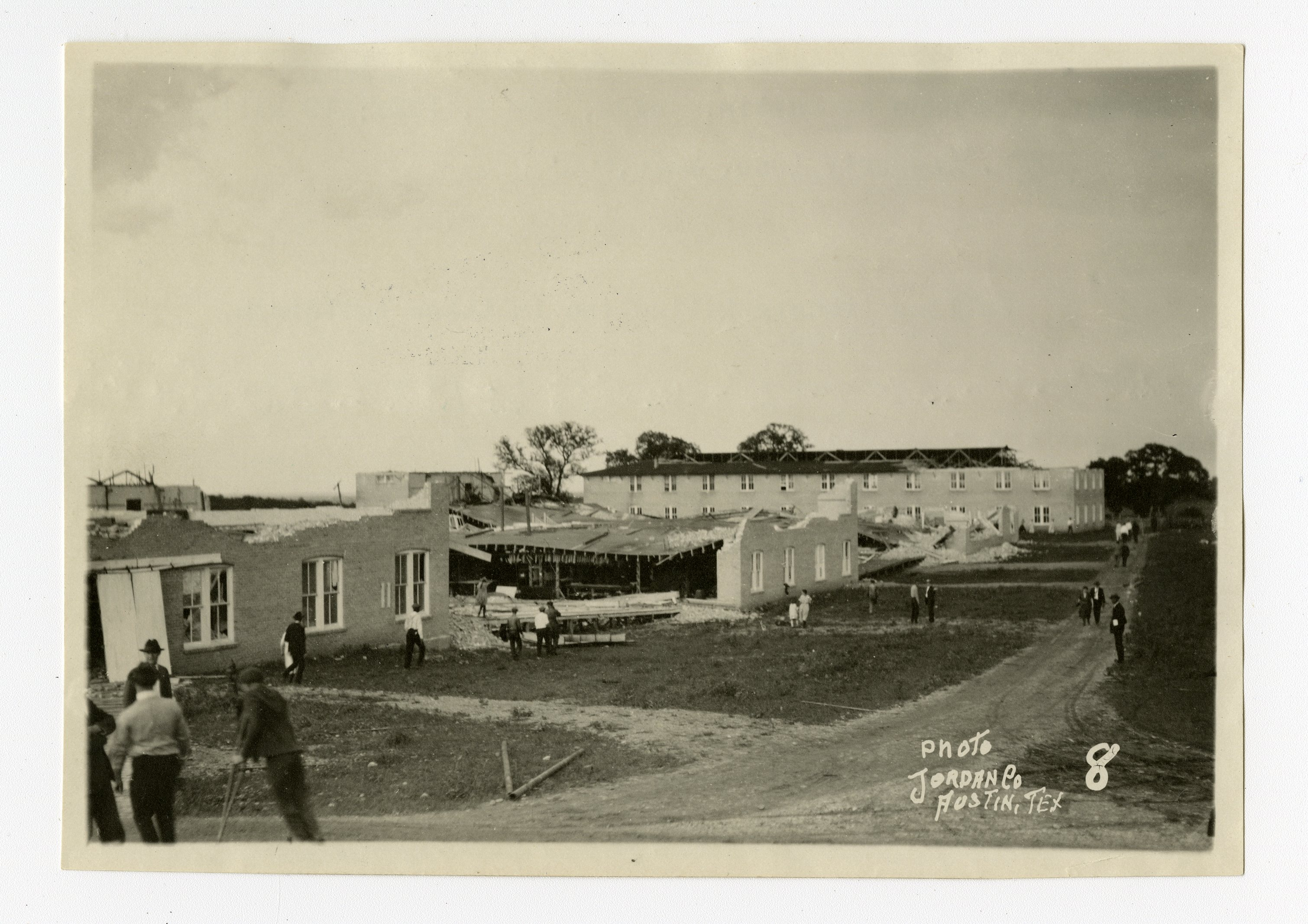
Buildings damaged by trees felled by the tornado

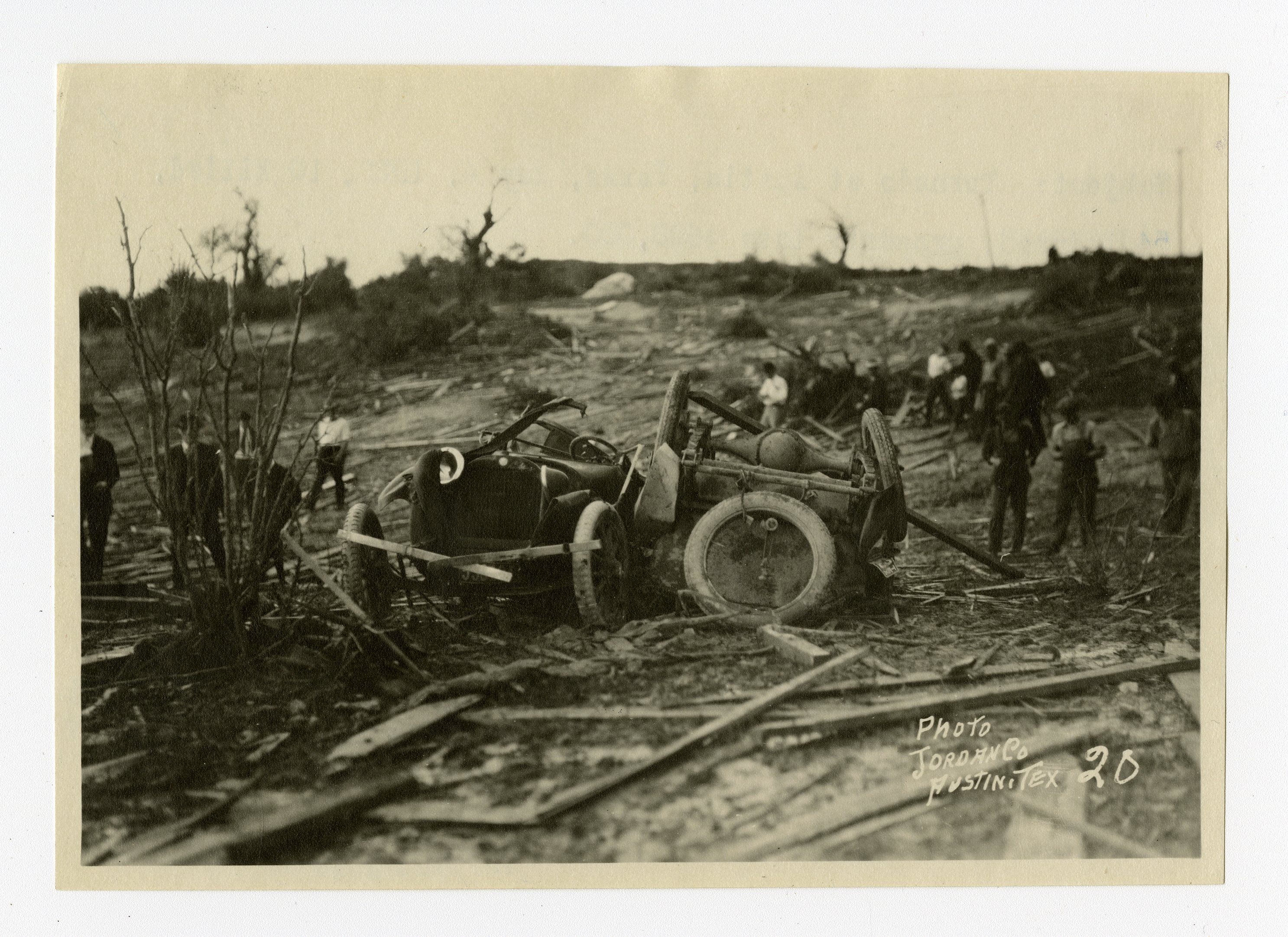
A damaged car after being thrown 200 ft (61 m) by the tornado

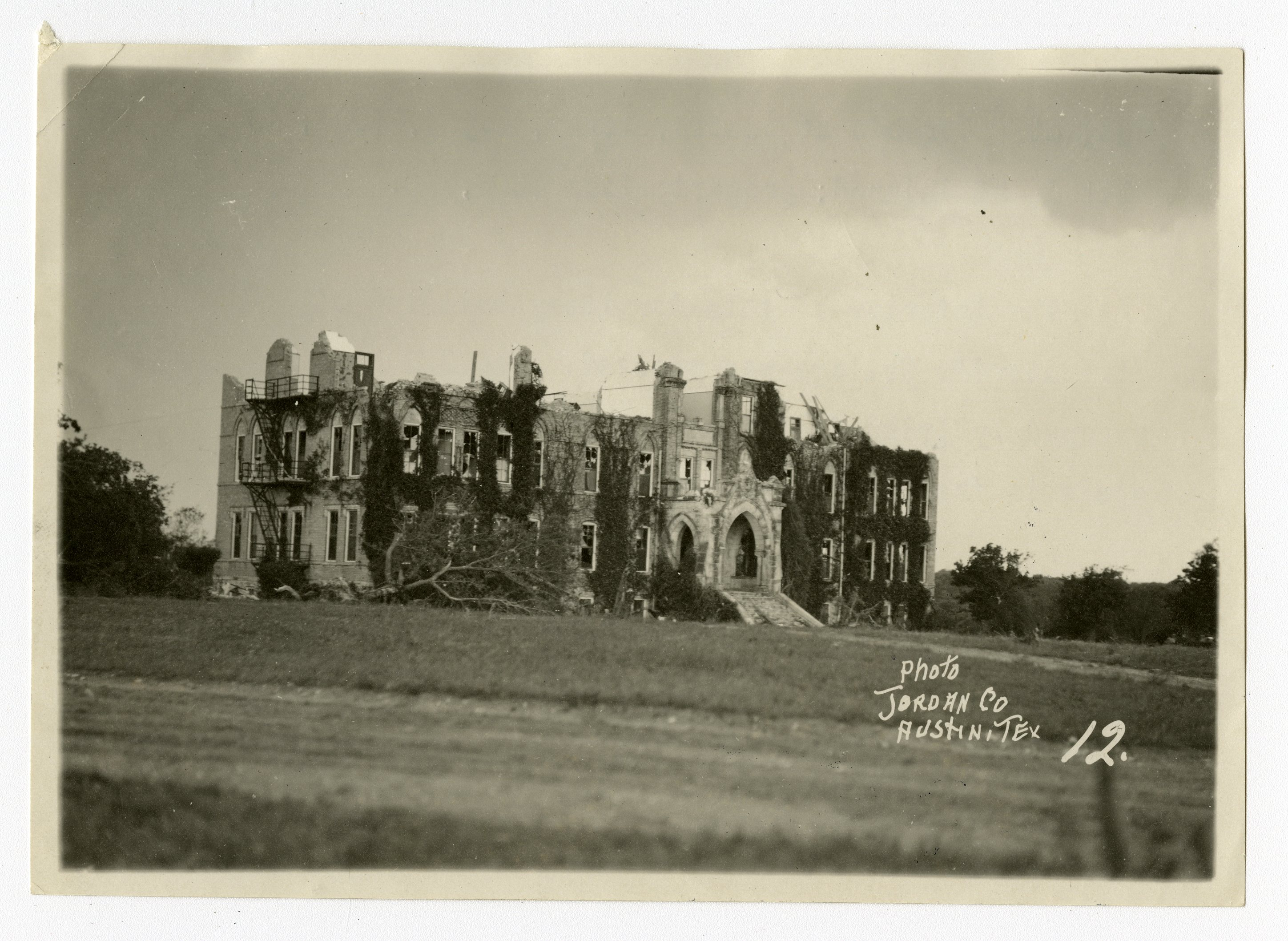
A damaged dormitory at St. Edward's University

== Aftermath ==
Damage toll reported by The Austin Statesman
Locale	Damage
Woodward Manufacturing Company	$400,000
St. Edward's University	$250,000
Texas Deaf, Dumb, and Blind Institute for Colored Youth	$30,000
Deep Eddy	$15,000
Travis Heights	$9,000
East Austin	$7,500
Oak Hill	$500
Other locations	$5,000

The tornadoes cut off telecommunications with South Austin. Local chapters of the American Red Cross established a distribution center for relief supplies at the Austin Chamber of Commerce, appealing for donations of clothing and bedding from residents of Travis County. Cash donations were also solicited by the chamber of commerce. Hundreds of visitors took to the city from other towns to observe the devastation caused by the tornadoes. Local firemen, police, members of the American Legion, and a detachment of the Texas Rangers secured the St. Edward's University campus and Penn Field to preserve property and belongings left behind by the storms. The chambers of commerce of Dallas and San Antonio also offered to assist the city's recovery.

Work crews were dispatched to clear debris around the city. The reconstruction and repair of damaged homes near Deep Eddy, in East Austin, and in the Travis Heights community began within a few days; in some cases, contracts for rebuilding were awarded before noon on May 5. St. Edward's University began a fundraising campaign to accrue $250,000 for repairs to campus buildings. Students were housed in temporary quarters until the end of the school term in June following the damage to the dormitories. The Woodward Manufacturing Company, once a significant contributor to Austin's economy, transitioned into a furniture company after suffering extensive losses.

== See also ==
- List of North American tornadoes and tornado outbreaks
- 1953 Waco tornado outbreak
- 1970 Lubbock tornado
