= Bradford, Kansas =

Ghost town in Wabaunsee County, Kansas

Coordinates: 38°49′18″N 96°02′21″W

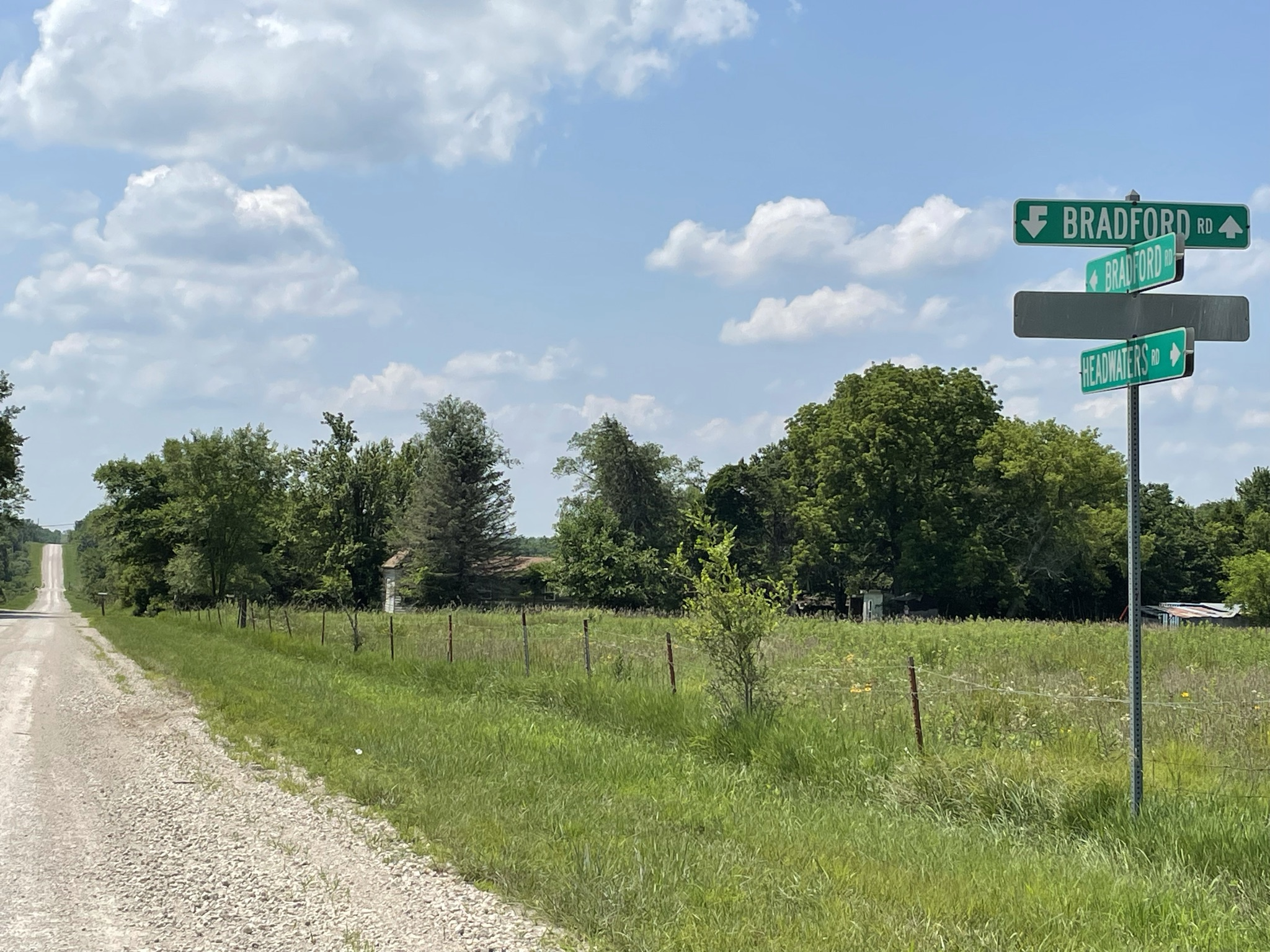
Bradford (2021)

Bradford is a ghost town in Wabaunsee County, Kansas, United States. It was located between Eskridge and Harveyville.

== History ==
A post office was opened in Bradford in 1890, and remained in operation until it was discontinued in 1941.
