= Wilmington, Kansas =

Unincorporated community in Wabaunsee County, Kansas, United States

- Unincorporated community
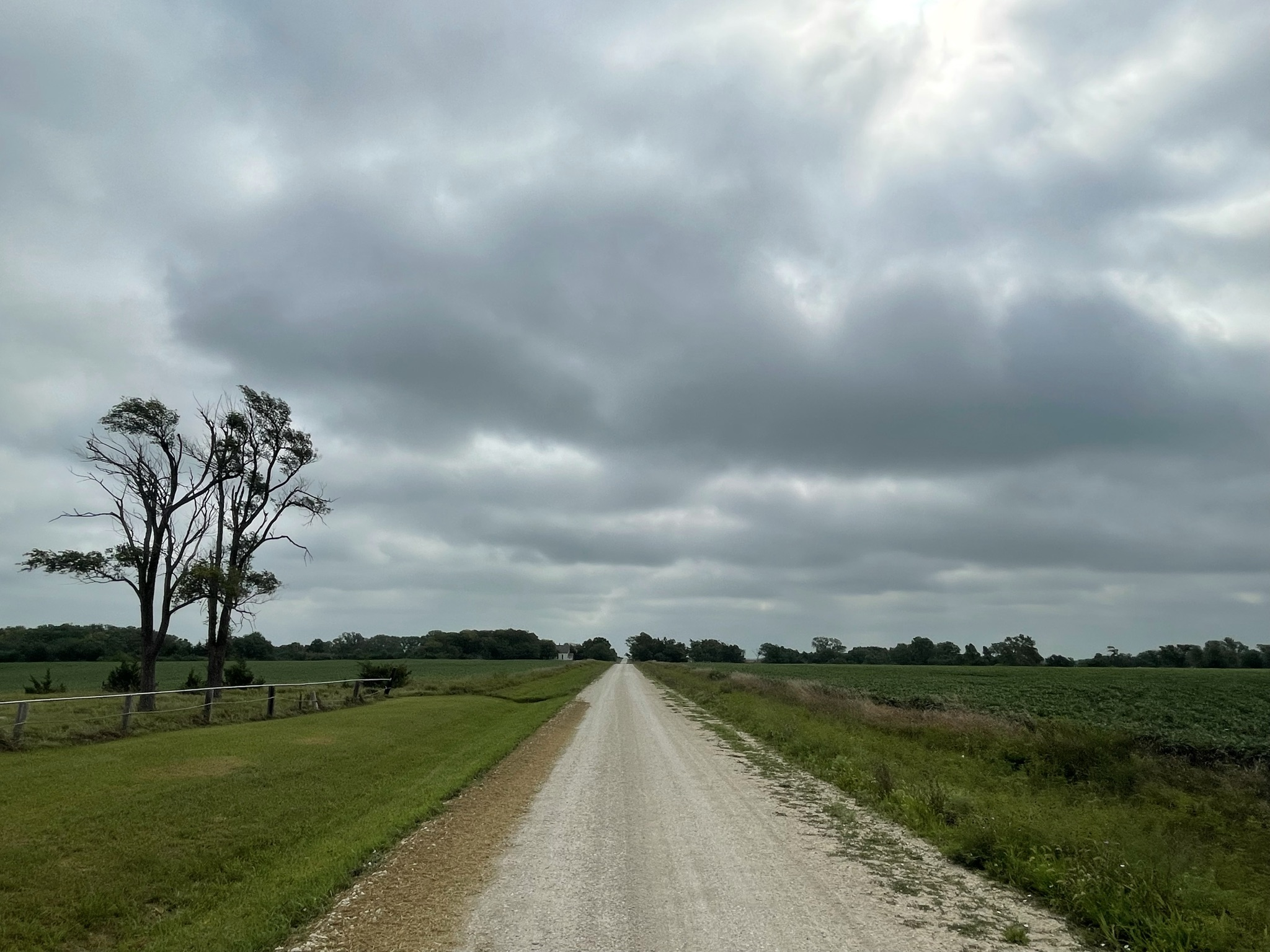
- Main road in Wilmington

- Location within Kansas Location within the United States
- Coordinates: 38°44′40.02″N 95°57′33.96″W
- Country: United States
- State: Kansas
- County: Wabaunsee
- Organized: 1858
- Elevation: 1,178 ft (359 m)
- Time zone: UTC-6 (CST)
  - Summer (DST): UTC-5 (CDT)
- FIPS code: 20-79515
- GNIS ID: 484884

Wilmington is an unincorporated community in Wabaunsee County, Kansas, United States. It is located approximately four miles south of Harveyville.

== History ==
A post office was opened in Wilmington in 1857 and a stone church and school opened in 1870. Wilmington initially hosted 30 houses, two stores, a blacksmith, two doctors, a wagon shop and a hotel. The town met its demise when the Manhattan, Burlingame & Alma Railroad was built through Harveyville. Shortly after many businesses moved away and the population dwindled. The post office closed in 1906 and by 1910 the population had fallen to 69. The school closed in 1950, but still stands today.

Wilmington was a stop on the Santa Fe Trail.

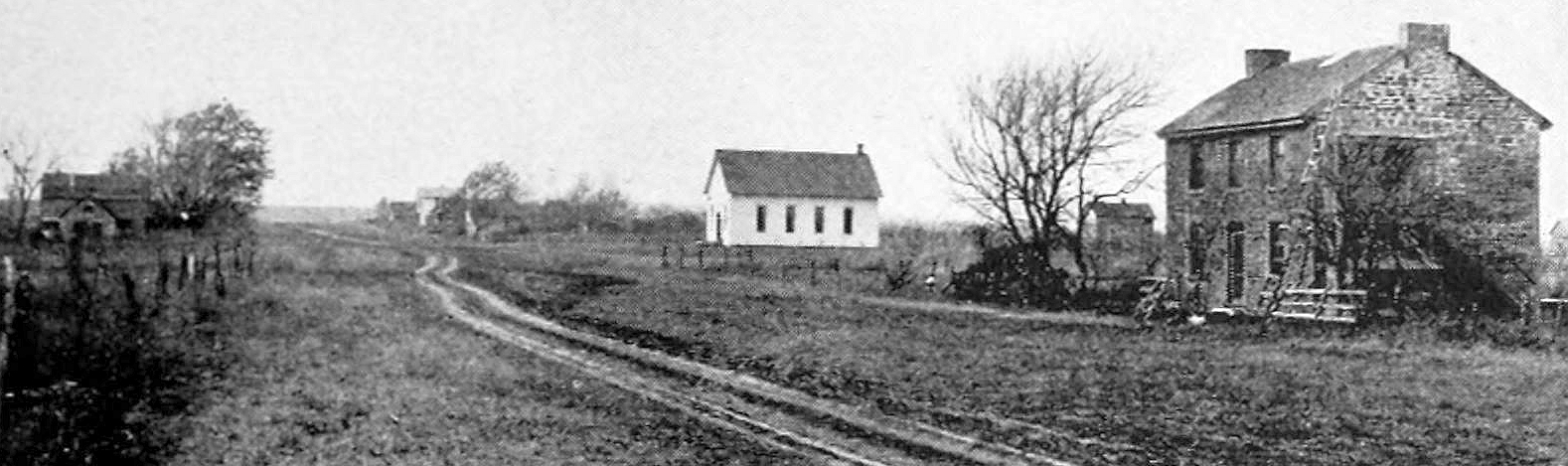
Wilmington, 1901

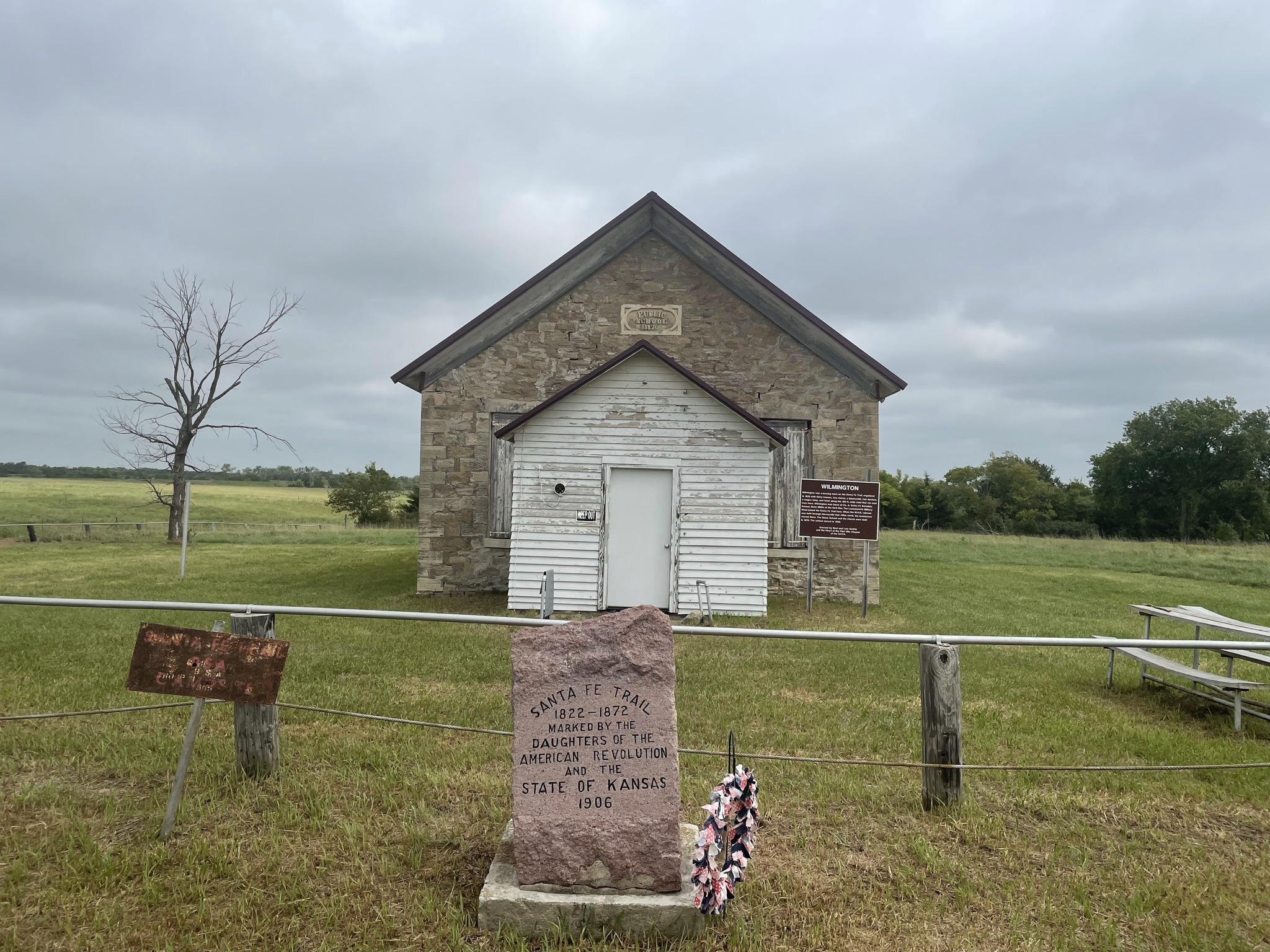
Stone schoolhouse (2021)

== Education ==
The community is served by Mission Valley USD 330 public school district.
