= Mission Valley USD 330 =

Public school district in Eskridge, Kansas

Address
- 12913 Mission Valley Road Eskridge, Kansas, 66423; United States
- Coordinates: 38.8863°N 96.0018°W

District information
- Type: Public
- Grades: Pre-K to 12
- Schools: 2

Students and staff
- District mascot: Vikings

Other information
- Website: www.mv330.org

Mission Valley USD 330 is a public unified school district headquartered in Eskridge, Kansas, United States. The district includes the communities of Eskridge, Harveyville, Dover, Keene, Wilmington, and nearby rural areas.

== Schools ==
The school district operates the following schools located 6 miles northeast of Eskridge:

- Mission Valley Jr.-Sr. High School
- Mission Valley Elementary

== History ==
In 2004, "Wabaunsee East USD 330" changed its name to "Mission Valley USD 330".

== See also ==
- Kansas State Department of Education
- Kansas State High School Activities Association
- List of high schools in Kansas
- List of unified school districts in Kansas
