= Penn Field (Airfield) =

- Austin, Texas
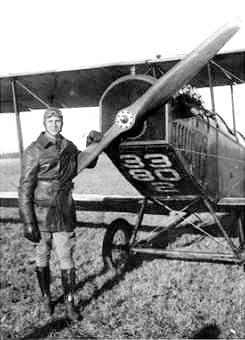
- A 1918 photograph of a pilot with a Curtiss JN-4 Jenny at Penn Field, Austin, Texas

Site information
- Type: Pilot training airfield
- Controlled by: Air Service, United States Army
- Condition: Redeveloped into urban area

Location
- Location within Texas
- Coordinates: 30°13′36″N 97°45′36″W

Site history
- Built: 1917
- In use: 1918
- Battles/wars: World War I

Garrison information
- Garrison: Training Section, Air Service

Penn Field is a former World War I military airfield, located in Austin, Texas. It operated as a radio training field for the Air Service, United States Army between 1917 until 1919. The airfield was one of thirty-two Air Service training camps established in 1918 after the United States entry into World War I.

== History ==
The field was named Penn Landing Field in memory of aviation cadet Eugene Doak Penn, an Austin flyer, who died in a training accident near Foggia, Italy, on May 20, 1918.

=== World War I ===
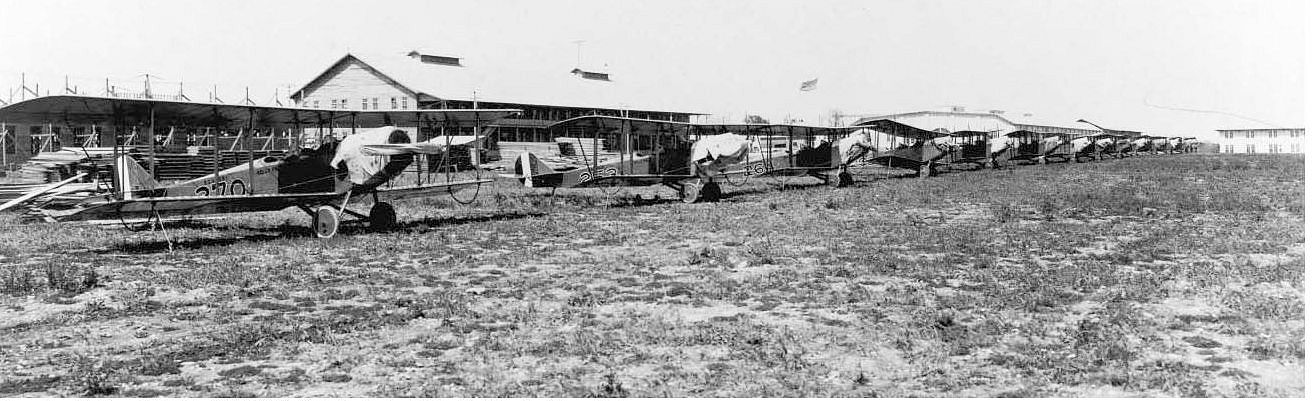
Flightline at Penn Field, 1918

Penn Field was established in 1918 for use of the School of Military Aeronautics conducted by the University of Texas for the United States government. A perspicacious chamber of commerce, anticipating the need in Austin for an aircraft-landing field, secured an option on land just south of Austin. It included a part of the campus of St. Edward's University and some adjacent land owned by Landa, Gruene and Marbach of New Braunfels. General George O. Squire, chief signal officer of the United States Army Signal Corps, deemed 150 acres suitable for a landing field; he approved the site in September 1917.

Lt. John A. McCurdy, commander of advanced cross-country and formation flying at Kelly Field, San Antonio, made a flight into the field and approved it except for the rocks and cornstalks. The chamber of commerce appointed a cleanup committee, and on four Sundays in September volunteer labor, including Boy Scouts and boys from the Deaf and Dumb Institute, picked up and hauled away 317 truckloads of rocks from the surface. The quantity of cornstalks removed is not recorded.

Lt. McCurdy subsequently began bringing in flights of twelve to twenty Curtiss JN-4 Jenny trainers into Penn Field several times a week. Penn Field was intended for pilot training during World War I. However, the war ended before the airfield was completed. In March 1918 the University of Texas was authorized to establish a radio school. Brackenridge Hall was the first location of the school, but it was soon moved to Penn Field. The university took up the option on the land and purchased 318 acres for $40,000. A railway track was laid to the site, and by November 1918 five brick buildings totaling 168,000 square feet were constructed.

=== Post World War I ===
After the war ended in 1918 the site was auctioned off to the highest bidder for $107,000. The Woodward Truck Body Company installed machinery there and manufactured wooden truck bodies until the plant was destroyed by a tornado on May 4, 1922. The buildings were reconstructed, and the Woodward Furniture Factory went into operation in them and manufactured furniture during most of the Great Depression.

There was no airfield on the site during World War II. Over the years the state of the buildings began to deteriorate. In the fall of 2000 the buildings were renovated into modern office space. However, the developers chose not to tear down the old brick buildings, but instead they built within them. The buildings are completely modern inside with an aged exterior that hints at its history.

The site of Penn Field is located in Austin, east of the intersection of South Congress Avenue & Alpine Road West, immediately south of the St. Edward's University campus.

== See also ==
- List of Training Section Air Service airfields
