= Deep Eddy Pool =

Historic public pool in Austin, Texas, U.S.

- Deep Eddy Bathing Beach
- U.S. National Register of Historic Places
- U.S. Historic district
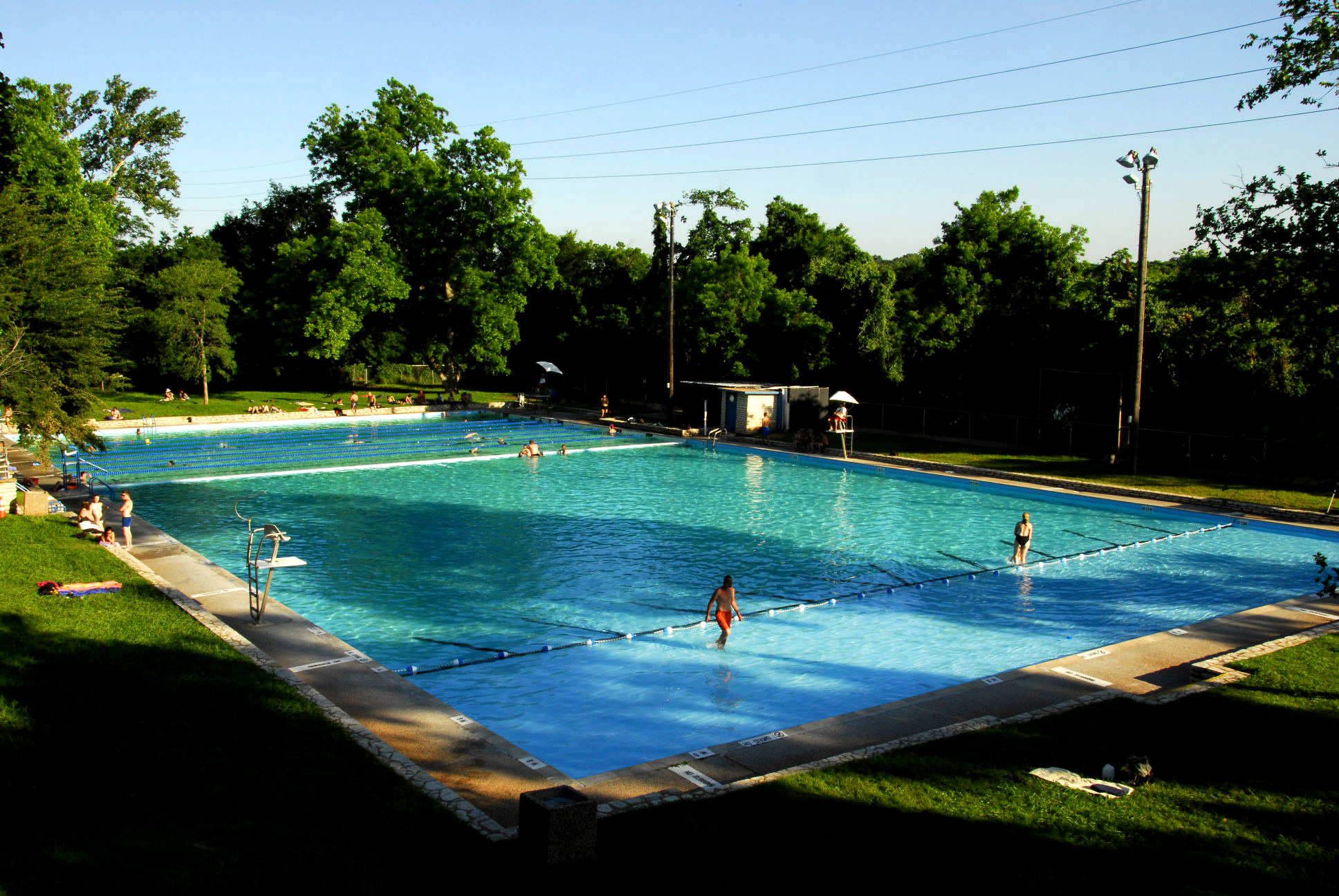
- Deep Eddy Pool
- Location: 401 Deep Eddy Ave., Austin, Texas, U.S.
- Coordinates: 30°16′35″N 97°46′23″W
- Area: 9 acres (3.6 ha)
- Built: July 1936
- Architects: Dan Driscoll, Delmar Groos
- Architectural style: NPS Rustic
- NRHP reference No.: 03000560
- Added to NRHP: 23 June 2003

Deep Eddy Pool is a historic man-made swimming pool in Austin, Texas, United States. Deep Eddy is the oldest swimming pool in Texas and features a bathhouse built during the Depression era by the Works Progress Administration. The pool began as a swimming hole in the Colorado River, became a resort in the 1920s, and is today a popular swimming pool operated by the City of Austin.

== History ==
=== Private ownership ===
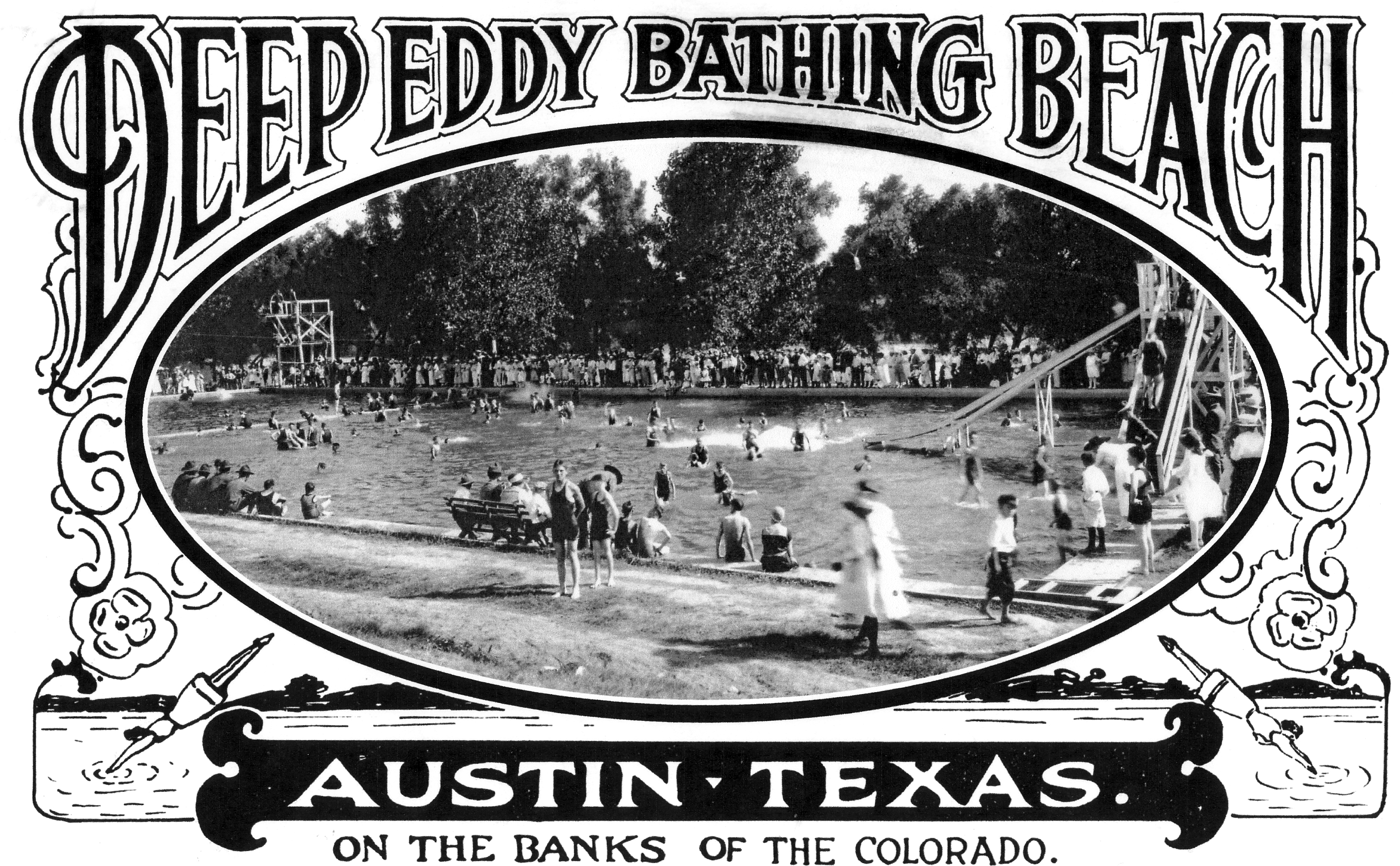
Deep Eddy Bathing Beach in the 1920s.

Deep Eddy began as a swimming hole located along the banks of the Colorado River which flows through Austin. It takes its name from an eddy that was formed by a large limestone outcropping which once jutted out into the river. In 1902, siblings Mary and Henry Johnson established the Deep Eddy Bathing Beach on the property (which was owned by their father). At that time the property was located outside of Austin, but was a short walk from the end of the city's electric trolley car line. Along with boating, camping, and fishing, amenities included a zip line, a dancing pavilion, and a horse-powered merry-go-round. In this era, before the advent of widespread public parks, the Deep Eddy Bathing Beach served as a "privately owned recreation area open to the public."

In 1915, the business and land were sold to A.J. Eilers and Partners. Eilers then hired contractors Max Brueggerman and William Maufrias to build a concrete pool which opened during the summer of 1916. George Rowley, a partner of Eilers and a former movie theater owner from San Antonio, was hired to manage the business; he and his family moved into the caretaker's house on the property. A wooden bathhouse was built, as well as nineteen wooden rental cottages which replaced the campsites on the hill overlooking the pool. Under Rowley's management, the Deep Eddy Bathing Beach was "as much carnival ground as swimming pool". A Ferris wheel was built, as well as a 70-foot slide that emptied into the pool. There were "springboards, a flying trapeze, flying rings, horizontal bars and a forty-foot diving tower." Free silent movies were shown on a movie screen that was installed in the park adjacent to the pool, and a variety of entertainers performed such as Fred Lowery, Marcia Burke the "World Champion Diving Baby", and Jack Freith "the Human Fish" who ate food while underwater. Perhaps the most popular performer was Lorena and Her Diving Horse. The act, which was performed regularly each evening, saw Lorena, astride her horse, dive off a specially built platform into a canvas-lined tank 30 to 50 feet below.

=== Public ownership ===
In May 1935, the City of Austin bought the property for $10,000. Less than a month after the purchase, a massive flood on the Colorado River destroyed the bathhouse and other improvements, and filled the pool with mud and debris. The Works Progress Administration and the city of Austin jointly funded the building of a new bathhouse, which was designed by Austin architects Dan Driscoll and Delmar Groos. The new bathhouse was a mixture of Moderne and Rustic architectural styles; a relatively simple, L-shaped, single story building of rough-hewn and locally quarried limestone. The "pagoda-like roof", consisting of three metal platforms of decreasing size topped with a twenty-foot spire, covered only the reception area at the intersection of the two wings where swimmers paid their entry fees. At the center of this area sat an octagonal wood and limestone ticket counter, and above it hung a "wagon wheel, ringed with lights, suspended by chains." The men's and women's dressing rooms were located on either side of the entryway and were open to the elements. Initial plans called for the entire structure to be roofed, but the roofs over the dressing areas were removed from the plans when the project went overbudget. Using less space, the new bathhouse could accommodate more bathers than the private dressing rooms or cabanas which it replaced, and this economy was "passed on to the public through lower usages fees." The pool and bathhouse opened as a public park in July 1936.

Over time, the city has put the property to a variety of uses. While the pool continues in operation, the city separated the western edge of the land as a park and playground named after A.J. Eilers. In 1962, the Austin Natural Science Center moved into the eastern portion of the bathhouse and significant alterations to the building were made. The patio on the southeastern side of the building was covered, and animal pens were installed along the outside of the eastern wall. Educational programs were hosted there, and exhibits on native Texas wildlife were on display. The western side of the bathhouse, however, remained dedicated to pool activities. After the Natural Science Center moved to Zilker Park in the 1980s, the building was used as office space until it was discovered that structural problems with the roof made it unsafe to occupy. Consequently, that portion of the bathhouse became a "forgotten city asset" until an effort to restore the bathhouse was spearheaded by the Friends of Deep Eddy group in 2002.

In 2003, for safety reasons, the city removed the 70-year-old, 50-foot-tall (15 m) cottonwoods that surrounded the pool. In 2012 the City of Austin rebuilt the pool due to stubborn leaks in the pool shell which had been patched repeatedly. Work crews poured a new bottom on both sides of the pool, and repaired small cracks and leaks. The pool's west end was smoothed and lengthened and a beach-type (zero-depth) entry was created. The project also included the widening of the pool deck, the addition of another pump outlet, as well as a new wrought iron fence and new lifeguard stands.

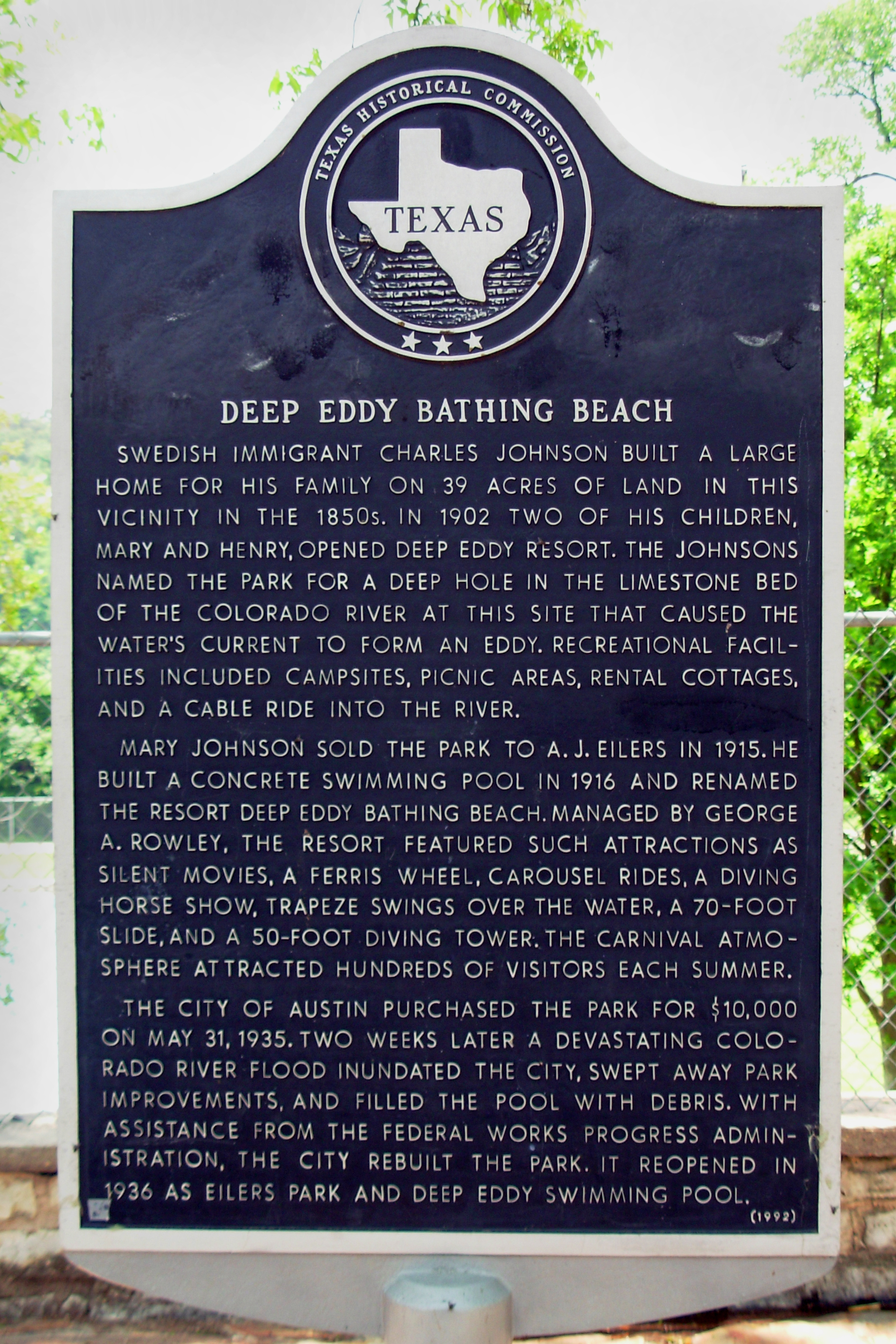
Historical marker at Deep Eddy Pool

Deep Eddy Pool is listed as a historic landmark on the National Register of Historic Places and has been the inspiration of various works of art. Architectural design elements were replicated by Dan Driscoll in his design of the Barton Springs Pool Bathhouse in 1946, Texas musician Jimmie Dale Gilmore wrote the song "Deep Eddy Blues" about the pool and the nearby bar, the Deep Eddy Cabaret.

== The pool today ==
Deep Eddy Pool is popular with adult recreational swimmers for its lap swimming pool and with children for its large wading pool. The 600,000-gallon freshwater pool is divided into two sections, the water in each section is cleaned out and replaced every other day. The pool is fed with clear, cold water from two wells, one at 300 ft and a second new one at 400 ft, and is not chlorinated. Water temperature varies between 68 and 75 °F (20 and 24 °C). The lap swimming pool is generally open during daylight hours all year, though hours are shortened during winter months. The lap and the wading pool are open from March 14 through October 31, 8:00am to 8:00pm. In summer months, the pool sponsors Splash Party Movie Nights, showing family films on an inflatable movie screen visible by swimmers and waders. The pool supports a number of sporting events, including the Deep Eddy Mile swimming competition.

== Bathhouse restoration ==
Since the 1960s, two thirds of the original bathhouse had been closed to swimmers and put to various uses by the City of Austin. During this time, rather than enter through the original reception area, visitors entered around the side of the bathhouse and paid their fee at an exterior counter. From there they could use one of two dressing rooms which had been carved out of the original men's dressing room. Over time, the repurposed portions of the bathhouse, namely the original entryway and women's dressing room, fell into disrepair and were boarded up. In 2002, the Friends of Deep Eddy, a non-profit association of swimmers and other parks advocates, began a fundraising campaign to renovate the bathhouse to its historic condition. An initial inspection in the spring of 2003 found that the roof was near total collapse and the site was infested by vermin. First construction on the project began in 2005 when the Friends group replaced the dilapidated roof. At that point the group had raised $315,000 of the $1 million needed to restore the bathhouse, with most of the money coming from individual donors, proceeds from special events, and T-shirt sales. With work underway, the seriousness of the group's effort became apparent to institutional donors and the City of Austin. Funds for the project started to come in from the Houston Foundation, the Austin Community Foundation, the Moody Foundation, and the Michael & Susan Dell Foundation. The Austin City Council eventually committed $500,000 to the project.

Austin-based architects, Laurie Limbacher and Al Godfrey, were hired to perform the restoration work. Although their preservation plan restored the building to its original configuration, several alterations were made to improve conditions for swimmers and staff. A decorative metal gable was installed around the women's dressing room to enhance privacy while maintaining the roofless nature of the structure. A lounge for lifeguards and a manager's office were also added. A concrete-cooling system, which pumps cold water from the pool beneath the floor of the lobby, was installed to keep the room comfortable during the summertime without the use of air conditioning. Final construction and reopening of the bathhouse took place in June 2007. In the end, over 700 individuals and businesses contributed to the project. According to the Austin Chronicle, the Friends of Deep Eddy established "a model for future Austin public works."

== Works cited ==
- Beal, Chandra Moira (1999). Splash Across Texas!. Austin, Texas: La Luna Publishing. ISBN 0-9671604-0-5.
- Swenson, Hannah (2002). USDI/NPS NRHP Registrafion Form Deep Eddy Bathing Beach, Austin, Travis County, Texas (PDF) (Report).
- Vaughan, Hannah (2008). "Deep Eddy Bathhouse: Preserving a Sense of Place, One Layer at a Time". Sound Historian. 11: 14–23.
