= Keene, Kansas =

Unincorporated community in Wabaunsee County, Kansas

Coordinates: 38°57′27″N 96°02′21″W

Keene is an unincorporated community in Wabaunsee County, Kansas, United States.

== History ==
A post office was opened in Keene in 1877, and remained in operation until it was discontinued in 1901.

Keene Cemetery is located about one and one-half miles to the east, on Highway K-4.

== Education ==
The community is served by Mission Valley USD 330 public school district.
