= Texas Blind, Deaf, and Orphan School =

Information
- Founded: 1887
- Closed: 1965
- Last updated: 29 December 2017

Texas Blind, Deaf, and Orphan School was a school for blind and deaf black people in Austin, Texas. Throughout its history, due to educational segregation in the United States, the school served only black students and had black teachers; whites attended the Texas School for the Deaf (TSD) and the Texas School for the Blind and Visually Impaired (TSBVI).

== History ==
The 18th Texas Legislature established the school in 1887 and spent $50,000 to acquire the site and build the facility. The school, originally named the Texas Deaf, Dumb, and Blind Institute for Colored Youth, opened on October 17, 1887. Initially, it had two teachers and 17 students. The school had dormitory facilities for students, with it initially having eleven dormitory rooms and with another dormitory and classroom building opening in 1888. It developed a dialect of sign language divergent from that of TSD because of their separation.

In 1943, the Texas State Colored Orphans' Home merged into the deaf and blind school, and its name changed to the Texas Blind, Deaf, and Orphan School. The school moved into a new campus in 1961. In 1965, its name was changed to the Texas Blind and Deaf School, and it merged into TSD that year.

The Texas State Library and Archives Commission took portions of the property east of Shoal Creek after the State of Texas deemed the former campus to be "excess property" in 1963; in 1987 the state gave all other portions to the Texas Department of Transportation (TxDOT). The State of Texas earmarked parts of the land for an annex of the Texas State Cemetery in 1995; as of 2016 no cemetery use has yet occurred.

Susan Dial of the University of Texas stated that as there was never a historical examination of the buildings, and that historic evidence would be destroyed without one. In 2016 Michael Barnes of the Austin American-Statesman wrote "Virtually nothing remains of the campus". In 2016 the developer ARG Bull Creek had plans to build a development there.

== Campus ==
The final site, in East Austin, located along Airport Boulevard, became the TSD East Campus in 1965. The State of Texas had built 11 buildings at the site, formerly occupied by the Montopolis Drive-in Theater, for $1.5 million in 1961. These buildings had a capacity of 1,208 students. After the 2000–2001 school year TSD sold this property to the City of Austin, and the two campuses were consolidated. The Austin Animal Center now occupies the site.

The original campus was on a 100-acre (40 ha) site between 38th Street and 45th Street on Bull Creek Road. TXDOT had offices there from the 1980s. Charles Page Sr. had designed the administration building in 1923. In 2016 Barnes stated that the administration building and other major buildings are "Long gone" and "presumably demolished".
