= Mission Valley High School =

Location
- 12685 Mission Valley Road; Eskridge, Kansas 66423; United States; 38°53′11″N 96°00′06″W

Information
- School type: Public, High School
- Status: Open
- School district: Mission Valley USD 330
- NCES District ID: 2006060
- NCES School ID: 200606000626
- Principal: Andrew Singleton
- Teaching staff: 20.70 (FTE)
- Grades: 7-12
- Student to teacher ratio: 10.43
- Color
- Fight song: Onward Vikings
- Athletics conference: Flint Hills League
- Mascot: Viking
- Website: School website

Mission Valley High School is a combined public secondary and middle school located 6 miles northeast of Eskridge, Kansas, United States. It is operated by the Mission Valley USD 330 public school district and serves students of grades 7 to 12.

== History ==
In 2008, it had an enrollment of 181.

The Northeast Kansas Amateur Astronomers’ League Inc. (NEKAAL) has a facility located on the school property: Farpoint Observatory has had the discovery of over 400 asteroids and one of the faintest comets discovered by an amateur astronomer.

== Academics ==
As of the 2023–2024 school year, the school requires a total of 25 credits to graduate. These credits include 9 credits in Electives, 4 credits in English, 3 credits in Mathematics, Science, and Social Studies, 1 credit for Career Technical Education and Fine Arts, and, as of the 2024–2025 school year, 0.5 credits in Financial Literacy. Students are also allowed to take courses based on the Kansas Scholars Program.

In order to qualify for valedictorian, students are required to complete the Kansas Scholars Curriculum, along with completing a minimum of 40 community service hours.

College courses are offered through 3 different programs. These include both face-to-face and virtual instruction. Face to face instruction includes instruction from nearby vocational schools and virtual instruction includes courses within the Career Technical Education program.

=== Career Technical Program pathways ===
As part of the Career Technical Program, the school offers 13 pathways for career education. These pathways include courses in Agriculture Education, Business, and Family and Consumer Sciences. To complete a pathway, at least 3 credits must be accumulated.

== Athletics ==
The school participates in the Flint Hills League athletic conference. The school competes in a variety of sports or other athletic conference sponsored-activities, which span both the middle and high school. The school has won many championships including three state softball titles in 2001, 2003, and 2014, baseball state championships in 2001 and 2003, and a 3-1A dance title in November 2024.

== See also ==
- List of high schools in Kansas
- List of unified school districts in Kansas
