= Eskridge, Kansas =

City in Wabaunsee County, Kansas

- City
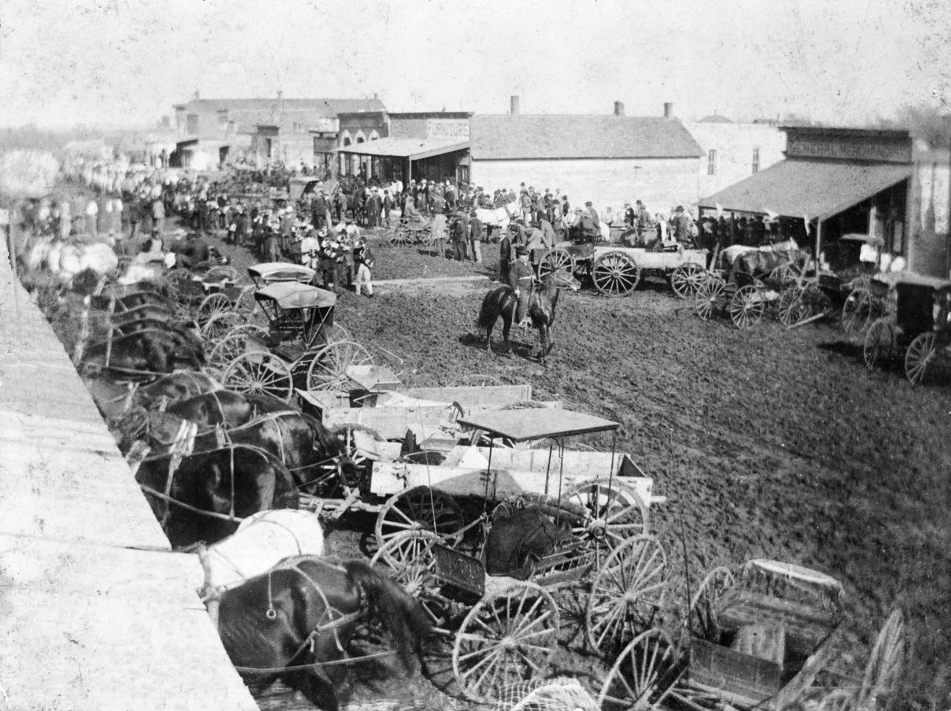
- Fourth of July parade (1886)
- Motto: "Gateway to the Flint Hills"
- Location within Wabaunsee County and Kansas

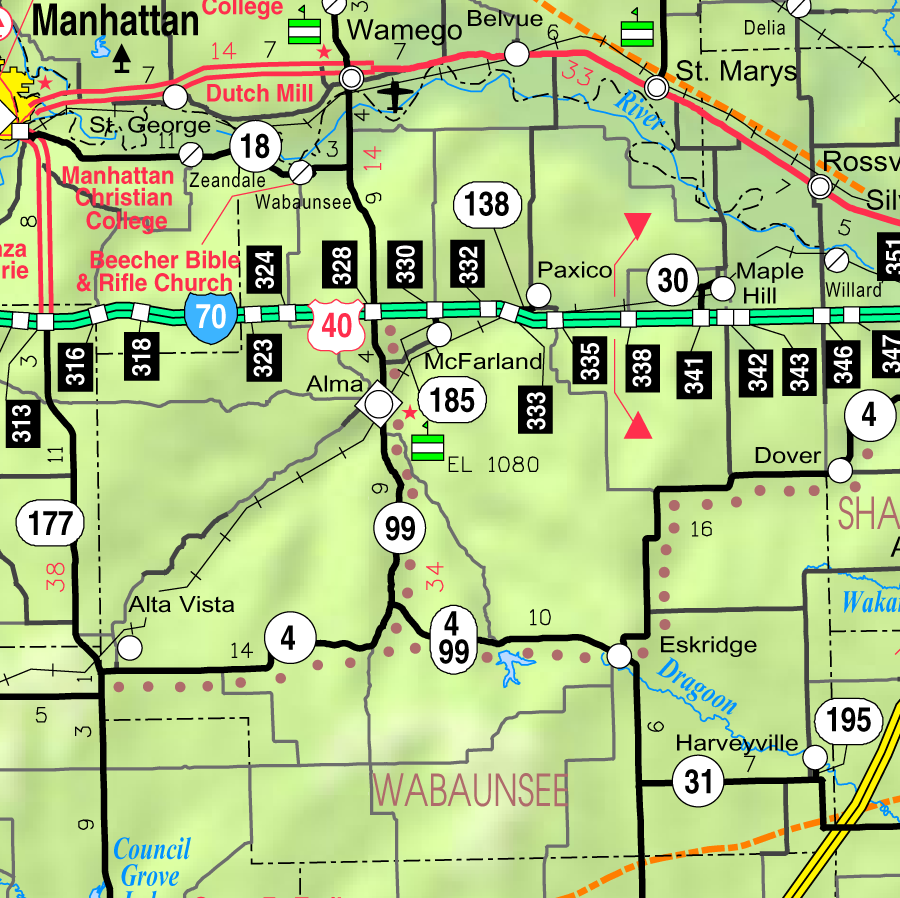
- KDOT map of Wabaunsee County (legend)
- Coordinates: 38°51′34″N 96°06′18″W
- Country: United States
- State: Kansas
- County: Wabaunsee
- Platted: 1868
- Incorporated: 1887
- Named for: Charles Eskridge

Government
  - Type: Mayor–Council

Area
  - Total: 0.52 sq mi (1.34 km^{2})
  - Land: 0.52 sq mi (1.34 km^{2})
  - Water: 0 sq mi (0.00 km^{2})
- Elevation: 1,408 ft (429 m)

Population (2020)
  - Total: 439
  - Density: 849/sq mi (328/km^{2})
- Time zone: UTC-6 (CST)
  - Summer (DST): UTC-5 (CDT)
- ZIP Code: 66423
- Area code: 785
- FIPS code: 20-21650
- GNIS ID: 2394701
- Website: eskridgeks.org

Eskridge is a city in Wabaunsee County, Kansas, United States. As of the 2020 census, the population of the city was 439.

== History ==
Eskridge was laid out in 1868. The town experienced growth in 1880 when the railroad was built through it.

Eskridge is named for Charles V. Eskridge, an Emporia journalist and politician. Colonel Ephraim Sanford, the founder of the town company allowed Eskridge to buy the first lot and have the town named after him. Eskridge served in both houses of the legislature and was elected as lieutenant governor under Governor James M. Harvey in 1869.

In 1943, German and Italian prisoners of World War II were brought to Kansas and other Midwestern states as a means of solving the labor shortage caused by American men serving in the war effort. Large internment camps were established in Kansas: Camp Concordia, Camp Funston (at Fort Riley), Camp Phillips (at Salina under Fort Riley). Fort Riley established 12 smaller branch camps, including one west of Eskridge at Lake Wabaunsee.

== Geography ==
According to the United States Census Bureau, the city has a total area of 0.52 square miles (1.35 km^{2}), all land.

=== Climate ===
The climate in this area is characterized by hot, humid summers and generally mild to cool winters. According to the Köppen Climate Classification system, Eskridge has a humid subtropical climate, abbreviated "Cfa" on climate maps.

Climate data for Eskridge, Kansas (1991–2020 normals, extremes 1897–present)
Month	Jan	Feb	Mar	Apr	May	Jun	Jul	Aug	Sep	Oct	Nov	Dec	Year
Record high °F (°C)	73 (23)	82 (28)	91 (33)	94 (34)	99 (37)	109 (43)	115 (46)	113 (45)	109 (43)	98 (37)	85 (29)	76 (24)	115 (46)
Mean maximum °F (°C)	61.2 (16.2)	67.0 (19.4)	77.6 (25.3)	84.3 (29.1)	88.0 (31.1)	93.0 (33.9)	98.7 (37.1)	98.2 (36.8)	92.3 (33.5)	85.7 (29.8)	73.2 (22.9)	63.0 (17.2)	100.3 (37.9)
Mean daily maximum °F (°C)	38.2 (3.4)	43.9 (6.6)	55.1 (12.8)	65.1 (18.4)	74.5 (23.6)	83.9 (28.8)	89.0 (31.7)	87.9 (31.1)	80.0 (26.7)	67.7 (19.8)	53.4 (11.9)	41.7 (5.4)	65.0 (18.3)
Daily mean °F (°C)	28.0 (−2.2)	32.6 (0.3)	42.9 (6.1)	52.9 (11.6)	63.6 (17.6)	73.1 (22.8)	77.7 (25.4)	76.1 (24.5)	67.9 (19.9)	55.8 (13.2)	42.5 (5.8)	32.0 (0.0)	53.8 (12.1)
Mean daily minimum °F (°C)	17.8 (−7.9)	21.4 (−5.9)	30.7 (−0.7)	40.8 (4.9)	52.7 (11.5)	62.3 (16.8)	66.3 (19.1)	64.4 (18.0)	55.9 (13.3)	44.0 (6.7)	31.5 (−0.3)	22.2 (−5.4)	42.5 (5.8)
Mean minimum °F (°C)	−0.4 (−18.0)	2.9 (−16.2)	12.5 (−10.8)	26.6 (−3.0)	38.7 (3.7)	51.7 (10.9)	57.7 (14.3)	55.4 (13.0)	42.9 (6.1)	28.0 (−2.2)	14.5 (−9.7)	4.7 (−15.2)	−4.5 (−20.3)
Record low °F (°C)	−21 (−29)	−18 (−28)	−9 (−23)	10 (−12)	26 (−3)	39 (4)	49 (9)	43 (6)	29 (−2)	15 (−9)	−1 (−18)	−25 (−32)	−25 (−32)
Average precipitation inches (mm)	0.97 (25)	1.28 (33)	2.61 (66)	3.68 (93)	5.49 (139)	5.25 (133)	4.02 (102)	4.43 (113)	3.38 (86)	2.74 (70)	1.91 (49)	1.58 (40)	37.34 (948)
Average snowfall inches (cm)	4.8 (12)	5.9 (15)	1.8 (4.6)	0.3 (0.76)	0.1 (0.25)	0.0 (0.0)	0.0 (0.0)	0.0 (0.0)	0.0 (0.0)	0.1 (0.25)	1.9 (4.8)	3.3 (8.4)	18.2 (46)
Average precipitation days (≥ 0.01 in)	5.2	5.5	8.7	9.3	11.6	9.8	9.5	9.1	8.2	7.9	5.2	5.5	95.5
Average snowy days (≥ 0.1 in)	2.8	2.7	1.3	0.3	0.0	0.0	0.0	0.0	0.0	0.2	0.9	1.8	10.0
Source: NOAA

== Demographics ==
Historical population
Census	Pop.	Note	%±
1890	548		—
1900	612		11.7%
1910	797		30.2%
1920	759		−4.8%
1930	726		−4.3%
1940	648		−10.7%
1950	601		−7.3%
1960	519		−13.6%
1970	589		13.5%
1980	603		2.4%
1990	518		−14.1%
2000	589		13.7%
2010	534		−9.3%
2020	439		−17.8%
U.S. Decennial Census

Eskridge is part of the Topeka, Kansas Metropolitan Statistical Area.

=== 2020 census ===
The 2020 United States census counted 439 people, 179 households, and 107 families in Eskridge. The population density was 849.1 per square mile (327.8/km^{2}). There were 214 housing units at an average density of 413.9 per square mile (159.8/km^{2}). The racial makeup was 94.53% (415) white or European American (93.62% non-Hispanic white), 0.0% (0) black or African-American, 0.23% (1) Native American or Alaska Native, 0.23% (1) Asian, 0.0% (0) Pacific Islander or Native Hawaiian, 0.46% (2) from other races, and 4.56% (20) from two or more races. Hispanic or Latino of any race was 2.05% (9) of the population.

Of the 179 households, 23.5% had children under the age of 18; 43.0% were married couples living together; 32.4% had a female householder with no spouse or partner present. 34.1% of households consisted of individuals and 14.5% had someone living alone who was 65 years of age or older. The average household size was 2.2 and the average family size was 2.8. The percent of those with a bachelor's degree or higher was estimated to be 7.3% of the population.

18.7% of the population was under the age of 18, 4.6% from 18 to 24, 16.4% from 25 to 44, 32.3% from 45 to 64, and 28.0% who were 65 years of age or older. The median age was 54.3 years. For every 100 females, there were 101.4 males. For every 100 females ages 18 and older, there were 112.5 males.

The 2016–2020 5-year American Community Survey estimates show that the median household income was $39,375 (with a margin of error of +/- $10,499) and the median family income was $62,778 (+/- $33,012). Males had a median income of $31,250 (+/- $11,141). The median income for those above 16 years old was $26,181 (+/- $6,103). Approximately, 9.5% of families and 16.9% of the population were below the poverty line, including 11.3% of those under the age of 18 and 6.0% of those ages 65 or over.

=== 2010 census ===
As of the census of 2010, there were 534 people, 187 households, and 124 families residing in the city. The population density was 1,026.9 inhabitants per square mile (396.5/km^{2}). There were 233 housing units at an average density of 448.1 per square mile (173.0/km^{2}). The racial makeup of the city was 96.6% White, 1.1% African American, 0.2% Asian, 0.4% from other races, and 1.7% from two or more races. Hispanic or Latino of any race were 0.7% of the population.

There were 187 households, of which 32.6% had children under the age of 18 living with them, 51.3% were married couples living together, 11.8% had a female householder with no husband present, 3.2% had a male householder with no wife present, and 33.7% were non-families. 26.2% of all households were made up of individuals, and 9.6% had someone living alone who was 65 years of age or older. The average household size was 2.53 and the average family size was 3.08.

The median age in the city was 42.7 years. 24% of residents were under the age of 18; 6.8% were between the ages of 18 and 24; 21.6% were from 25 to 44; 31.3% were from 45 to 64; and 16.1% were 65 years of age or older. The gender makeup of the city was 48.1% male and 51.9% female.

=== 2000 census ===
As of the census of 2000, there were 589 people, 212 households, and 146 families residing in the city. The population density was 1,145.2 inhabitants per square mile (442.2/km^{2}). There were 238 housing units at an average density of 462.7 per square mile (178.6/km^{2}). The racial makeup of the city was 97.28% White, 1.02% African American, 0.68% Native American, 0.34% Asian, 0.34% from other races, and 0.34% from two or more races. Hispanic or Latino of any race were 1.36% of the population.

There were 212 households, out of which 31.6% had children under the age of 18 living with them, 53.8% were married couples living together, 9.9% had a female householder with no husband present, and 31.1% were non-families. 27.8% of all households were made up of individuals, and 13.7% had someone living alone who was 65 years of age or older. The average household size was 2.50 and the average family size was 3.01.

In the city, the population was spread out, with 23.3% under the age of 18, 7.8% from 18 to 24, 24.6% from 25 to 44, 24.8% from 45 to 64, and 19.5% who were 65 years of age or older. The median age was 40 years. For every 100 females, there were 96.3 males. For every 100 females age 18 and over, there were 91.5 males.

The median income for a household in the city was $37,917, and the median income for a family was $43,125. Males had a median income of $29,688 versus $18,125 for females. The per capita income for the city was $12,629. About 7.7% of families and 13.9% of the population were below the poverty line, including 14.4% of those under age 18 and 23.4% of those age 65 or over.

== Education ==
The community is served by Mission Valley USD 330 public school district, which was created by school unification when Eskridge / Harveyville / Dover schools consolidated. Mission Valley High School is located approximately 6 miles northeast of Eskridge, and its mascot is Mission Valley Vikings.

Eskridge High School was closed through school unification. Its last class graduated in 1971. The Eskridge High School mascot was Eskridge Dragons.
