= Harveyville, Kansas =

City in Wabaunsee County, Kansas

- City
- Location within Wabaunsee County and Kansas

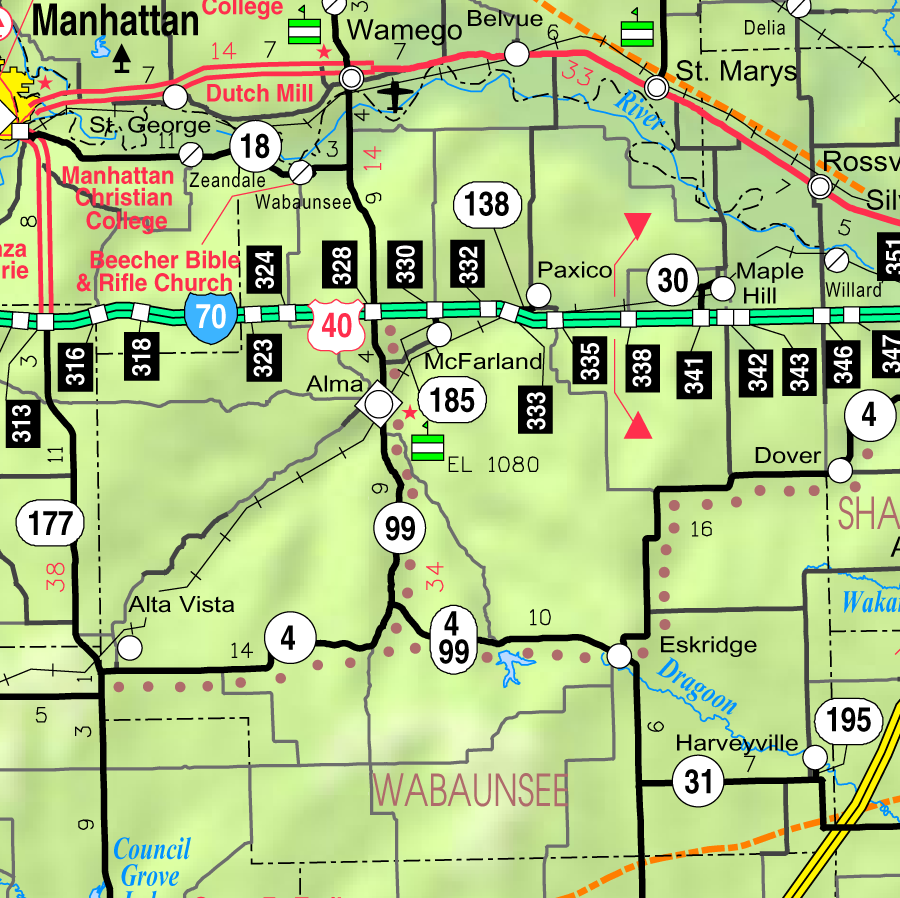
- KDOT map of Wabaunsee County (legend)
- Coordinates: 38°47′21″N 95°57′46″W
- Country: United States
- State: Kansas
- County: Wabaunsee
- Founded: 1880
- Incorporated: 1905
- Named for: Henry Harvey

Government
  - Type: Mayor–Council

Area
  - Total: 0.13 sq mi (0.33 km^{2})
  - Land: 0.13 sq mi (0.33 km^{2})
  - Water: 0 sq mi (0.00 km^{2})
- Elevation: 1,168 ft (356 m)

Population (2020)
  - Total: 178
  - Density: 1,400/sq mi (540/km^{2})
- Time zone: UTC-6 (CST)
  - Summer (DST): UTC-5 (CDT)
- ZIP Code: 66431
- Area code: 785
- FIPS code: 20-30575
- GNIS ID: 2394319

Harveyville is a city in Wabaunsee County, Kansas, United States. As of the 2020 census, the population of the city was 178. It is located 8.5 miles (13.7 km) northwest of the city of Burlingame.

== History ==
Harveyville was founded in 1880. It was named for Henry Harvey, a missionary to the Shawnee Indians and early settlers at the town site. Harveyville was incorporated as a city in 1905.

=== 2012 Tornado ===
On February 28, 2012, around 9:02 pm, an EF-2 tornado caused damage to Harveyville. Approximately 40 percent of Harveyville's buildings experienced significant damage and one of the town's two churches was completely destroyed. Preliminary damage assessments in Harveyville listed 28 homes as not livable with 36 sustaining moderate damage, six with minor damage and one commercial building damaged. Twelve people were injured and there was one death, but no missing people in the aftermath. The National Weather Service determined the tornado was on the ground for four minutes and had a maximum width of 150 yards (140 m). It touched down about 1 mile (1.6 km) southwest of Harveyville and ended 4 miles (6.4 km) northeast.

== Geography ==
Harveyville is located in the Osage Cuestas of the Great Plains.

According to the United States Census Bureau, the city has a total area of 0.13 square miles (0.34 km^{2}), all land.

=== Climate ===
The climate in this area is characterized by hot, humid summers and generally mild to cool winters. According to the Köppen Climate Classification system, Harveyville has a humid subtropical climate, abbreviated "Cfa" on climate maps.

== Demographics ==
Historical population
| Census | Pop. | Note | %± |
|---|---|---|---|
| 1910 | 331 | | — |
| 1920 | 333 | | 0.6% |
| 1930 | 321 | | −3.6% |
| 1940 | 302 | | −5.9% |
| 1950 | 236 | | −21.9% |
| 1960 | 204 | | −13.6% |
| 1970 | 279 | | 36.8% |
| 1980 | 280 | | 0.4% |
| 1990 | 267 | | −4.6% |
| 2000 | 267 | | 0.0% |
| 2010 | 236 | | −11.6% |
| 2020 | 178 | | −24.6% |
U.S. Decennial Census

Harveyville is part of the Topeka, Kansas Metropolitan Statistical Area.

=== 2020 census ===
The 2020 United States census counted 178 people, 82 households, and 47 families in Harveyville. The population density was 1,401.6 per square mile (541.1/km^{2}). There were 94 housing units at an average density of 740.2 per square mile (285.8/km^{2}). The racial makeup was 90.45% (161) white or European American (88.2% non-Hispanic white), 0.0% (0) black or African-American, 1.12% (2) Native American or Alaska Native, 0.56% (1) Asian, 0.0% (0) Pacific Islander or Native Hawaiian, 0.0% (0) from other races, and 7.87% (14) from two or more races. Hispanic or Latino of any race was 5.06% (9) of the population.

Of the 82 households, 20.7% had children under the age of 18; 50.0% were married couples living together; 23.2% had a female householder with no spouse or partner present. 41.5% of households consisted of individuals and 15.9% had someone living alone who was 65 years of age or older. The average household size was 2.2 and the average family size was 2.6. The percent of those with a bachelor's degree or higher was estimated to be 21.3% of the population.

19.7% of the population was under the age of 18, 7.3% from 18 to 24, 15.7% from 25 to 44, 36.0% from 45 to 64, and 21.3% who were 65 years of age or older. The median age was 50.3 years. For every 100 females, there were 81.6 males. For every 100 females ages 18 and older, there were 78.8 males.

The 2016–2020 5-year American Community Survey estimates show that the median household income was $57,292 (with a margin of error of +/- $18,037) and the median family income was $71,875 (+/- $17,216). Males had a median income of $21,917 (+/- $6,408) versus $52,000 (+/- $20,605) for females. The median income for those above 16 years old was $29,688 (+/- $11,007). Approximately, 8.1% of families and 7.9% of the population were below the poverty line, including 7.9% of those under the age of 18 and 16.2% of those ages 65 or over.

=== 2010 census ===
As of the census of 2010, there were 236 people, 93 households, and 66 families residing in the city. The population density was 1,815.4 inhabitants per square mile (700.9/km^{2}). There were 106 housing units at an average density of 815.4 per square mile (314.8/km^{2}). The racial makeup of the city was 95.3% White, 1.3% Native American, 1.7% Asian, and 1.7% from two or more races. Hispanic or Latino of any race were 2.1% of the population.

There were 93 households, of which 40.9% had children under the age of 18 living with them, 59.1% were married couples living together, 8.6% had a female householder with no husband present, 3.2% had a male householder with no wife present, and 29.0% were non-families. 25.8% of all households were made up of individuals, and 8.6% had someone living alone who was 65 years of age or older. The average household size was 2.54 and the average family size was 2.98.

The median age in the city was 40 years. 25.4% of residents were under the age of 18; 8.9% were between the ages of 18 and 24; 20.8% were from 25 to 44; 33.1% were from 45 to 64; and 11.9% were 65 years of age or older. The gender makeup of the city was 51.3% male and 48.7% female.

=== 2000 census ===
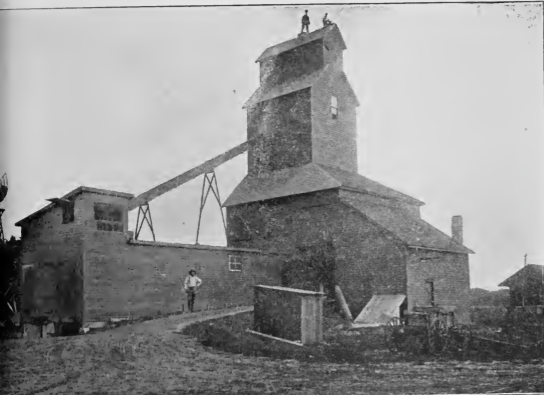
Garinger Farrell Elevator (1907)

As of the census of 2000, there were 267 people, 100 households, and 77 families residing in the city. The population density was 1,943.4 inhabitants per square mile (750.4/km^{2}). There were 109 housing units at an average density of 793.4 per square mile (306.3/km^{2}). The racial makeup of the city was 97.38% White, 0.75% Native American, 1.12% Asian, 0.37% from other races, and 0.37% from two or more races. Hispanic or Latino of any race were 1.12% of the population.

There were 100 households, out of which 42.0% had children under the age of 18 living with them, 69.0% were married couples living together, 6.0% had a female householder with no husband present, and 23.0% were non-families. 20.0% of all households were made up of individuals, and 10.0% had someone living alone who was 65 years of age or older. The average household size was 2.67 and the average family size was 3.05.

In the city, the population was spread out, with 30.0% under the age of 18, 6.7% from 18 to 24, 31.1% from 25 to 44, 20.2% from 45 to 64, and 12.0% who were 65 years of age or older. The median age was 34 years. For every 100 females, there were 120.7 males. For every 100 females age 18 and over, there were 107.8 males.

The median income for a household in the city was $37,250, and the median income for a family was $35,250. Males had a median income of $28,125 versus $18,125 for females. The per capita income for the city was $12,688. About 14.5% of families and 19.2% of the population were below the poverty line, including 21.0% of those under the age of eighteen and 5.0% of those 65 or over.

== Area attractions ==
Harveyville is home to the Harveyville Project, an Artist Residency and Sculpture Garden.

== Government ==
The Harveyville government consists of a mayor and five council members. The council meets on the 1st Monday of each month at 7 pm.

== Education ==
The community is served by Mission Valley USD 330 public school district, which was created by school unification when Eskridge / Harveyville / Dover schools consolidated. Mission Valley High School is located approximately 8 miles northwest of Harveyville, and its mascot is Mission Valley Vikings.

Harveyville High School was closed through school unification in 1970. The Harveyville Yellow Jackets won the Kansas State High School boys class BB Indoor Track & Field championship in 1966.

== Transportation ==
Highway K-31 passes along the south edge of Harveyville. Though the city is two miles northwest of the Kansas Turnpike, the nearest exit is located much farther southwest, along U.S. Route 56, in Lyon County.

== In popular culture ==
Harveyville is also the setting of the Depression era novel, "The Persian Pickle Club" by Sandra Dallas published in 1995 by St. Martin's Griffin.
