= Tornadoes of 1953 =

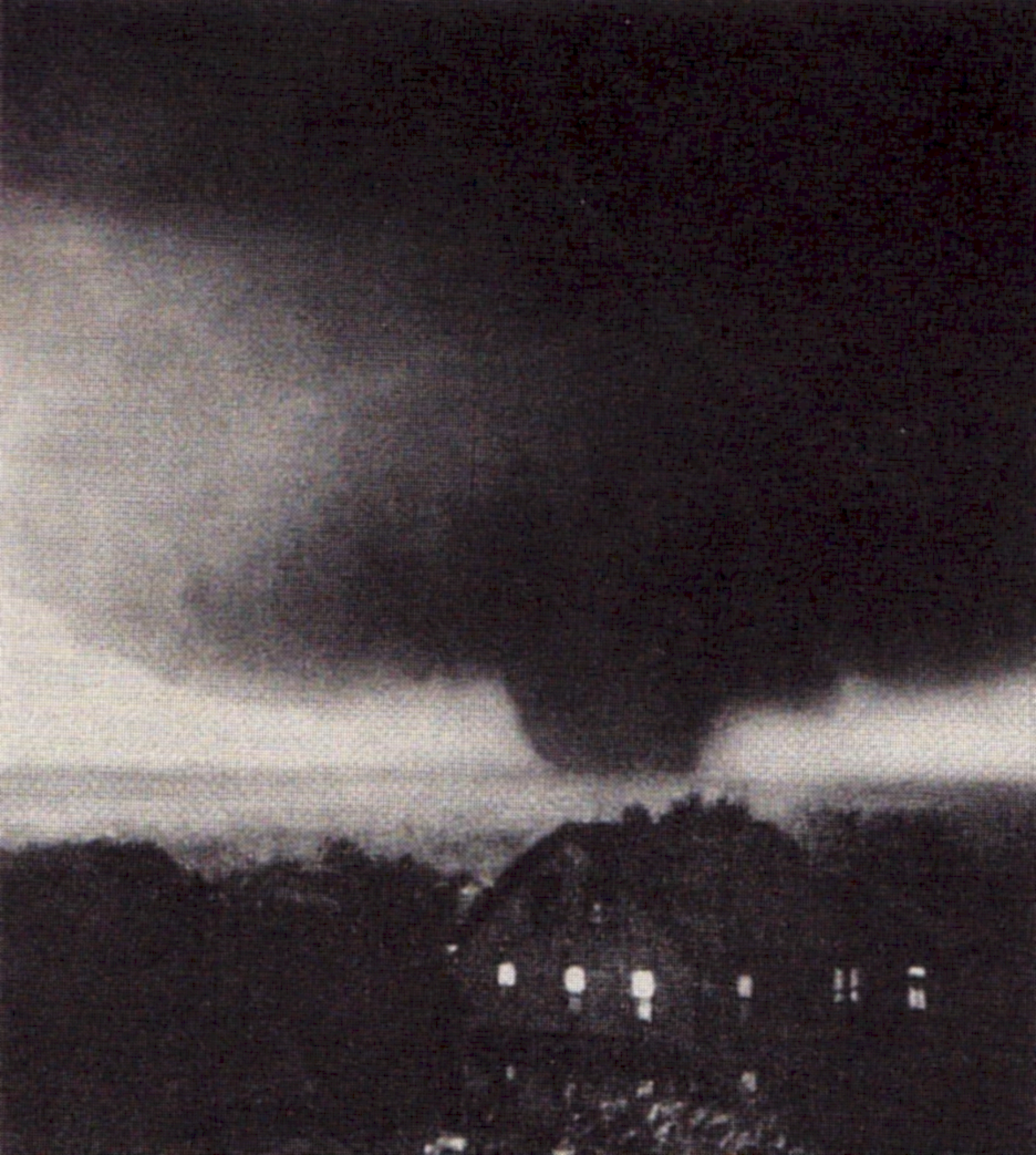
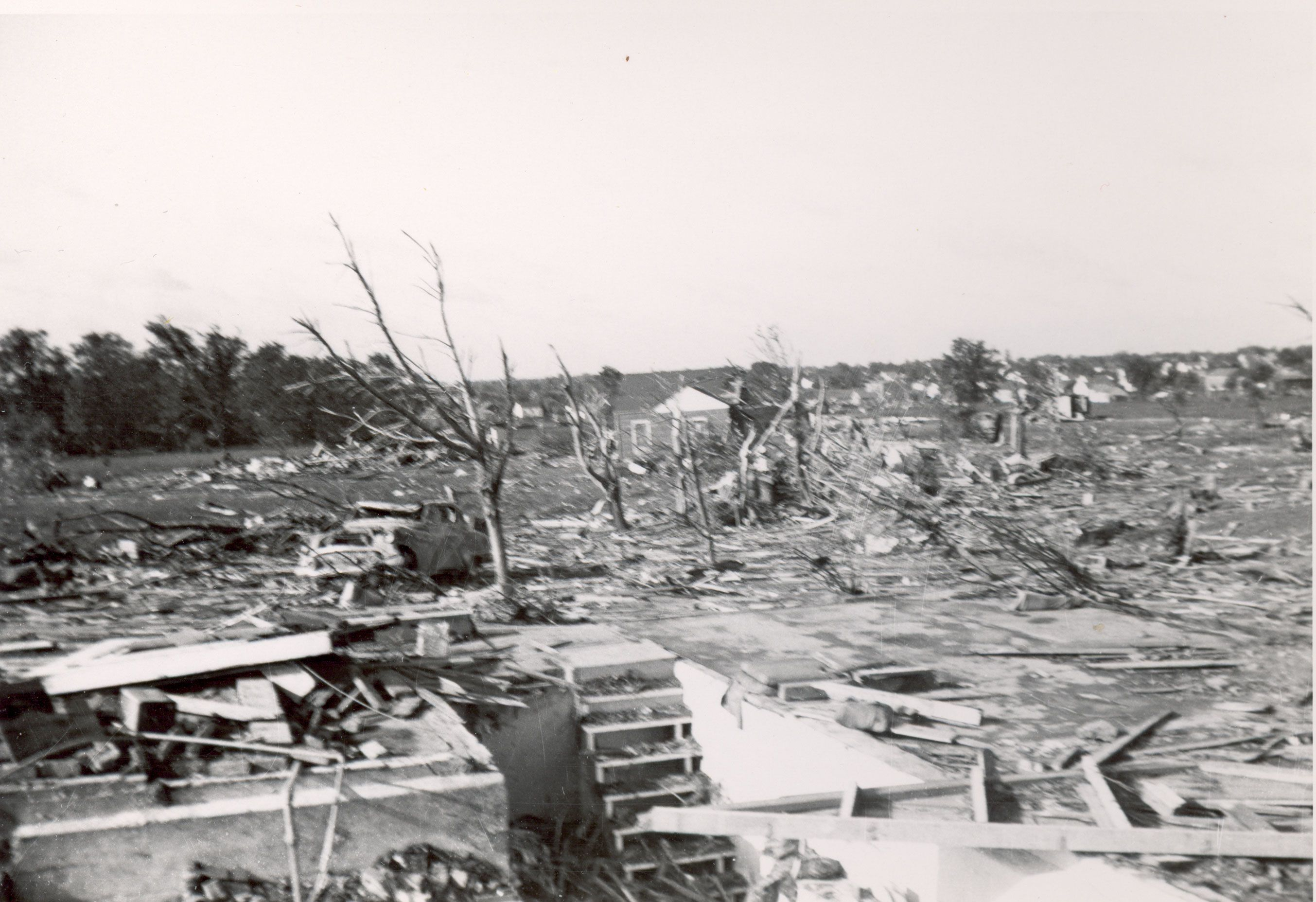
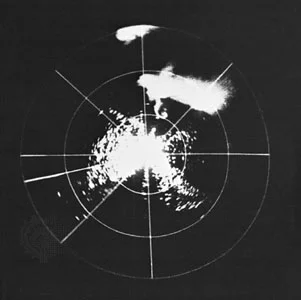
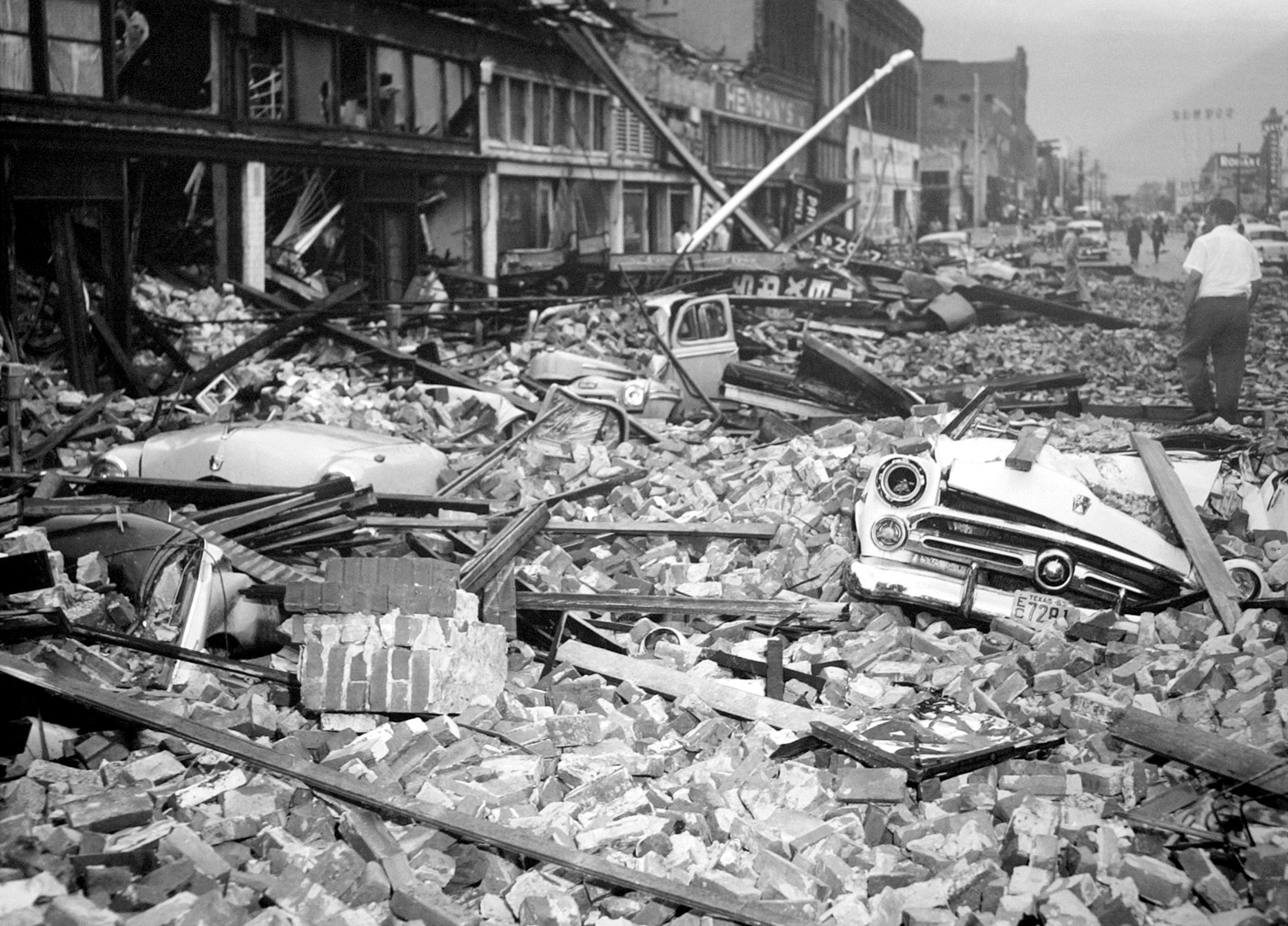
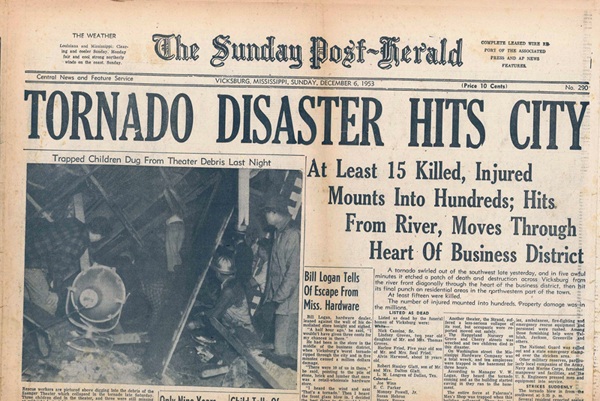
- Clockwise from top: An F4 tornado in Worcester, Massachusetts on June 9; A radar hook echo near Champaign, Illinois, being the first to be definitively linked to the occurrence of a tornado; The Vicksburg Evening Post following an F5 tornado on December 5; An F4 tornado approaching Warner Robins, Georgia on April 30; Damage to downtown Waco, Texas after an F5 on May 11; Violent damage to homes in Beecher, Michigan following a tornado on June 8.
- Timespan: 1953
- Maximum rated tornado: F5 tornado: Waco, Texas, on May 11; Fort Rice, North Dakota, on May 29; Beecher, Michigan on June 8; near Adair, Iowa on June 27; Vicksburg, Mississippi, on December 5
- Tornadoes in U.S.: 421
- Damage (U.S.): $596.105 million (1953 USD)
- Fatalities (U.S.): 523
- Fatalities (worldwide): >529

This page documents the tornadoes and tornado outbreaks of 1953 primarily in the United States. Most tornadoes form in the U.S., although some events may take place internationally. Tornado statistics for older years like this often appear significantly lower than modern years due to fewer reports or confirmed tornadoes. This was the first year to record an F5 tornado as well as one of the deadliest tornado seasons in official U.S. records, which go back to 1950.

The total count of tornadoes and ratings differs from various agencies accordingly. The article, therefore, documents information from the most contemporary official sources alongside assessments from tornado historian Thomas P. Grazulis.

== Events ==
Fatal United States tornadoes in 1953
- Approximate touchdown location of killer tornadoes in 1953
Summary of tornadoes
- February 6 – Louisiana (2 deaths)
- February 20 – Alabama (1 death)
- March 13 – Texas (17 deaths)
- March 13 – Oklahoma (1 death)
- March 13 – Oklahoma (2 deaths)
- March 14 – Mississippi (1 death)
- March 21 – Minnesota (1 death)
- March 22 – Louisiana, Mississippi (2 deaths)
- April 9 – Illinois, Indiana (3 deaths)
- April 18 – Alabama, Georgia (8 deaths)
- April 23 – Oklahoma (1 death)
- April 23 – Oklahoma (1 death)
- April 28 – Texas (1 death)
- April 28 – Texas (2 deaths)
- April 30 – Georgia (18 deaths)
- April 30 – Georgia (1 death)
- April 30 – Georgia (1 death)
- May 1 – Alabama (7 deaths)
- May 1 – Alabama (2 deaths)
- May 2 – Tennessee (4 deaths)
- May 9 – Nebraska (5 deaths)
- May 10 – Minnesota (6 deaths)
- May 10 – Iowa, Minnesota, Wisconsin (2 deaths)
- May 10 – Wisconsin (4 deaths)
- May 11 – Texas (13 deaths)
- May 11 – Texas (114 deaths)
- May 16 – Texas (1 death)
- May 20 – Iowa (1 death)
- May 21 – Michigan (2 deaths)
- May 29 – North Dakota (2 deaths)
- June 7 – Nebraska (11 deaths)
- June 8 – Michigan (4 deaths)
- June 8 – Ohio (17 deaths)
- June 8 – Michigan (1 death)
- June 8 – Michigan (4 deaths)
- June 8 – Michigan (116 deaths)
- June 9 – Massachusetts (94 deaths)
- June 27 – Iowa (1 death)
- December 2 – Texas (2 deaths)
- December 3 – Louisiana (9 deaths)
- December 5 – Mississippi (38 deaths)
Total fatalities: 523

Despite not many tornadoes being documented, 1953 was an extremely deadly season and set the record for most tornadoes recorded in the U.S. in a single year at the time. The first six months of the year generated several large outbreaks and outbreak sequences that killed over 400 people. Activity abruptly slowed after that before another outbreak sequence in early December killed 49. Many of the fatalities were caused by the unusually large number of violent tornadoes that were recorded that year. This included five F5 tornadoes, the first F5 tornadoes recorded in the US tornado database created in 1950. In all, there were 523 tornado-related fatalities in the US alone in 1953, the most since 1925. This high death toll would not be repeated until 2011. There were 5,131 injuries recorded throughout the year as well. 1953 is also the only year since 1950 to have three tornadoes kill over 90 people and to have two tornadoes kill over 110. On a positive note, major changes were made to improve both the warning and radar systems. These changes were successful and since 1953, only one tornado, the 2011 Joplin tornado, has killed more than 100 people.

=== United States yearly total ===
Confirmed tornadoes by Fujita rating
FU	F0	F1	F2	F3	F4	F5	Total
0	66	159	134	40	17	5	421

== January ==
There were 14 tornadoes confirmed in the US in January.

=== January 7–9 ===
FU	F0	F1	F2	F3	F4	F5
0	0	3	4	0	0	0

A three-day outbreak of seven tornadoes impacted the Southeast. Late on January 7, a skipping F2 tornado passed near Macedonia north of Warren, Arkansas damaging several homes, two extensively, damaging two barns, destroying several small outbuildings, and damaging trees. Two people were injured. The next day, an F2 tornado passed directly through Talladega, Alabama, damaging the roofs of 23 structures and blowing down trees onto telephone and power lines. Later, another F2 tornado passed near Effingham, South Carolina, destroying a home and 13 outbuildings and damaged 27 other homes and 44 other outbuildings. About 40 families were affected and two people were injured. On January 9, another F2 tornado moved through southwestern Hillsborough County, Florida, destroying five homes and damaging 53 others, and injuring 12 people. Overall, 16 injuries were confirmed.

== February ==
There were 16 tornadoes confirmed in the US in February.

=== February 6 ===
An isolated, but large F3 tornado touched down near Centerville, Louisiana and moved east-northeastward through Albany and Northern Hammond. It destroyed 26 homes and 35 other buildings, including warehouses. 107 other homes and 35 other buildings were heavily damaged. Strawberry crops were also damaged by both flying debris from the tornado and heavy rains. Two people were killed and 21 others were injured.

=== February 19–20 ===
FU	F0	F1	F2	F3	F4	F5
0	0	9	5	1	0	0

An outbreak of 15 tornadoes struck Texas, Oklahoma, Arkansas, Mississippi, and Alabama. Six F1 tornadoes touched down across the two Plains states on February 19 before several strong tornadoes struck the other states the next day. An F2 tornado destroyed a home in Glen Allen, Mississippi, injuring two people. Another F2 tornado passed through rural areas north of Pontotoc, Mississippi, damaging an unoccupied home and injuring one person (the CDNS report does not list an injury). Later, a brief, but destructive F3 tornado impacted the Wheeler Mountain community southwest of Tuscumbia, Alabama, destroying a home and four other buildings while damaging four other homes and seven additional buildings. One person was killed and eight others were injured. Further to the south, a strong F2 tornado near Winfield destroyed seven homes and 11 other buildings and damaged five more homes and two additional buildings, injuring two people. Another person was injured by another F2 tornado that destroyed five homes and 24 other buildings and damaged two more homes and three additional buildings north of Jasper in Macedonia. The outbreak ended with a destructive F2 tornado in Vina that destroyed 10 homes and 30 other buildings while damaging 39 other homes and 46 additional buildings. Six people were injured. Overall, the tornadoes killed one and injured 20.

== March ==
There were 40 tornadoes confirmed in the US in March.

=== March 12–15 ===
FU	F0	F1	F2	F3	F4	F5
0	1	4	11	6	1	0

The first major outbreak of the year struck areas from the Great Plains to the Ohio Valley. The worst tornado occurred on March 13, when an F4 tornado struck the towns of Jud, O'Brien, and Knox City, Texas, killing 17 and injuring 25. The same day, a destructive F3 tornado killed one and injured eight in Bradley, Oklahoma. A long-tracked F3 tornado family passed over Lake Murray State Park and struck Earl, Oklahoma, killing two and injuring 11. Several strong, destructive tornadoes touched down in Arkansas overnight into March 14 before another deadly F2 tornado killed one in Altitude, Mississippi. The outbreak ended the next day after an isolated, narrow but intense, long-track F3 tornado ripped through Northern Wilson, Macclesfield, and Crisp, North Carolina, injuring one. Overall, the outbreak produced at least 23 tornadoes, killed 21 people, and injured 72 others.

=== March 21–22 ===
FU	F0	F1	F2	F3	F4	F5
0	0	4	5	1	0	0

An outbreak of 10 tornadoes struck the Midwest and the Mississippi Valley. On March 21, an F1 tornado east of Danbury, Iowa destroyed a barn and a machine shed and damaged building on a farm. The roof of the machine shed fell on two occupants, injuring both of them. Later a large F3 tornado moved through Emmett County passing near Ringsted, striking at least two farms. It damaged or destroyed several barns, machine sheds, chicken houses, and other buildings and killed two cows and 100 chickens. There were no casualties from this tornado. In Minnesota, a brief but strong F2 tornado north of St. Cloud destroyed a launderette, storage warehouse, a lumber yard, and several garages and blew out several store fronts. A boy was killed in the launderette and three others were injured. (The CDNS report says that the three injuries actually came from another tornado that also killed one person when it struck Gibbon. That tornado is not officially counted and is, therefore, unconfirmed) The next day, a long-tracked F1 tornado tracked 101.3 mi (163.0 km) through Simpson, Smith, Jasper, Newton, and Lauderdale counties in Mississippi, damaging or destroying several homes and injuring one person. Around the same time, an even longer-tracked F2 tornado traveled 234.7 mi (377.7 km) through Louisiana and Mississippi (although this was more than likely a tornado family rather than just a single tornado as it was described as the jump-skip type). It first moved through Vernon, Natchitoches, Grant, Winn, Caldwell, Richland, West Carroll, and East Carroll parishes in Louisiana with the most severe damage in Columbia. Two people were killed and 22 others were injured in the state before the tornado crossed over into Washington County, Mississippi, doing additional damage before dissipating. Overall, the tornadoes killed three and injured 28.

== April ==
There were 47 tornadoes confirmed in the US in April.

=== April 5 (Bermuda) ===
FU	F0	F1	F2	F3	F4	F5
4	0	0	0	0	0	0

Four waterspouts moved from south to north over Bermuda in short succession, causing severe damage. About 90 properties were damaged, a few of which were deemed uninhabitable. The first of these storms passed near the Bermuda Meteorological Service, producing two wind gusts over 80 mph (130 km/h) as well as an eight millibar drop in pressure. The third one, which was the most damaging, struck Hamilton and Harrington Sound, killing one person. Several injuries were also confirmed from these storms.

=== April 9 ===
FU	F0	F1	F2	F3	F4	F5
0	0	1	1	1	0	0

A series of three tornadoes struck Kansas, Illinois, and Indiana. In Kansas, a brief F1 tornado touched down north-northwest of Dighton with no casualties. (the CDNS report says that this tornado was actually two tornadoes that occurred on April 29) Later, in Illinois, an F2 tornado hit the northwest side of Lincoln, striking the Logan County Fairgrounds before moving northeastward into rural areas and damaging buildings on six farms. Three people were injured. The worst tornado was a large and extremely long-tracked F3 tornado that traveled 156.7 miles (252.2 km) through Illinois and Indiana and was up to 750-yard-wide (690 m). Grazulis stated that this event was a tornado family of four tornadoes. Embedded within a larger area of damaging straight-line winds and large hail, the tornado began near Leverett, Illinois in Champaign County and tracked east-northeastward through Vermilion County, causing major damage in rural areas and several small communities. Particularly hard-hit was the towns of Collison, Jamesburg, and Bismarck. Across the Illinois part of the track, eight homes were destroyed and 72 others were damaged, some field crops were damaged, and many stored crops and livestock were lost. One person was killed and 10 others were injured. The tornado was also the first tornado to be associated with a signature detected by weather radar as a hook echo was found as it passed by Champaign. After crossing into Indiana, the tornado moved at an average speed of ~47 mph (76 km/h) as it passed south of Attica. It moved through Warren, Tippecanoe, Clinton, Tipton, Madison, and Delaware counties before finally dissipating in Albany. It severely damaged or completely destroyed 150 buildings, threw a car 400 ft (120 m) before destroying it, and cut power to both Attica and Muncie. Two people were killed in Albany, while 12 others were injured. In all, the tornado killed three people and injured 22 others. The tornado was rated F4 by Grazulis based on the damage done north of Newtown, Indiana in Fountain County and damage in northwest Randolph County, although official records do not indicate that the tornado moved into Randolph County. In the end, the three tornadoes killed three people and injured 25 others.

=== April 18 ===
FU	F0	F1	F2	F3	F4	F5
0	0	0	2	1	0	0

Three strong and destructive tornadoes struck Alabama and Georgia. Most of casualties came from a large, long-tracked F3 tornado that traveled 39.8 miles through Alabama into Georgia. The 400 yard tornado touched down in Lochapoka, Alabama and moved southeast through Lee County damaging or destroying hundreds of homes. It then moved into Georgia and striking Bibb City on the north side of Columbus destroying 599 homes and other buildings and damaged over 2,500 others. Hundreds of trees and utility lines were blown down, blocking streets, knocking out electric services and smashing numerous automobiles and other property. The tornado killed eight people and injured 495 others. This, as of 2026, was the most injuries caused by an F3/EF3 tornado in the United States. Two additional F2 tornadoes also touched down in Georgia that day. The first one struck Montezuma, destroyed three homes and eight other buildings and damaging 73 other homes and 8 additional buildings, including a metal hangar that was lifted from its foundations and carried some distance across the Montezuma Airport. One person was injured and 75 families were affected. The second one struck Buena Vista, destroying 10 homes and 40 other buildings while damaging 25 other homes and 20 additional buildings. Many trees and utility lines were blown down, knocking out services and a large number of crops in storage, (mostly cotton seeds) were destroyed. Two people were injured and 50 families were affected. In the end, the tornadoes killed eight people and injured 498 others. Some of the same areas taken out by the F3 tornado were hit again by an even stronger and deadlier EF4 tornado on March 3, 2019.

=== April 23–24 ===
FU	F0	F1	F2	F3	F4	F5
0	0	2	5	1	0	0

Another destructive and deadly tornado outbreak hit Oklahoma, Arkansas, Mississippi, and Iowa with all the casualties occurring in Oklahoma. On April 23, an F2 tornado northeast of Weleetka, Oklahoma overturned a school bus several times, demolished several other buildings on a dairy farm and destroyed 25 telephone poles. One person was killed and four others were injured. A brief, but large, .5-mile-wide (0.80 km) F3 tornado moved over Alma, Arkansas, destroying multiple buildings, including a brand new brick structure, although there were no casualties. Later, another F2 tornado moved east-southeastward through Idabel, Oklahoma, damaging or destroying 11 buildings and injuring one. The worst tornado was a small, but deadly F2 tornado that moved northeastward and hit Eagletown, Oklahoma, destroying three homes, damaging six others, killing one person, and injuring 14 others. More tornado activity was confirmed the next day. An F2 tornado skipped northeastward through the college section of Texarkana, Arkansas, causing considerable damage to homes, trees, and vehicles, although there were no casualties. Another long-tracked F2 tornado touched down in Fayette, Mississippi and struck Downtown Jackson along its 96.7-mile-path (155.6 km). Although there were no casualties reported, several homes, other buildings, and trees were damaged and outbuildings were destroyed or damaged. Overall, eight tornadoes touched down, killing two people and injuring 16 others.

=== April 27 ===
A rare F2 tornado moved erratically through the west and north sides of Modesto, California. Although there were no casualties, a large dairy barn was obliterated, other structures were damaged, trees were uprooted, and power lines were broken.

=== April 28 – May 2 ===
FU	F0	F1	F2	F3	F4	F5
0	3	6	7	3	5	0

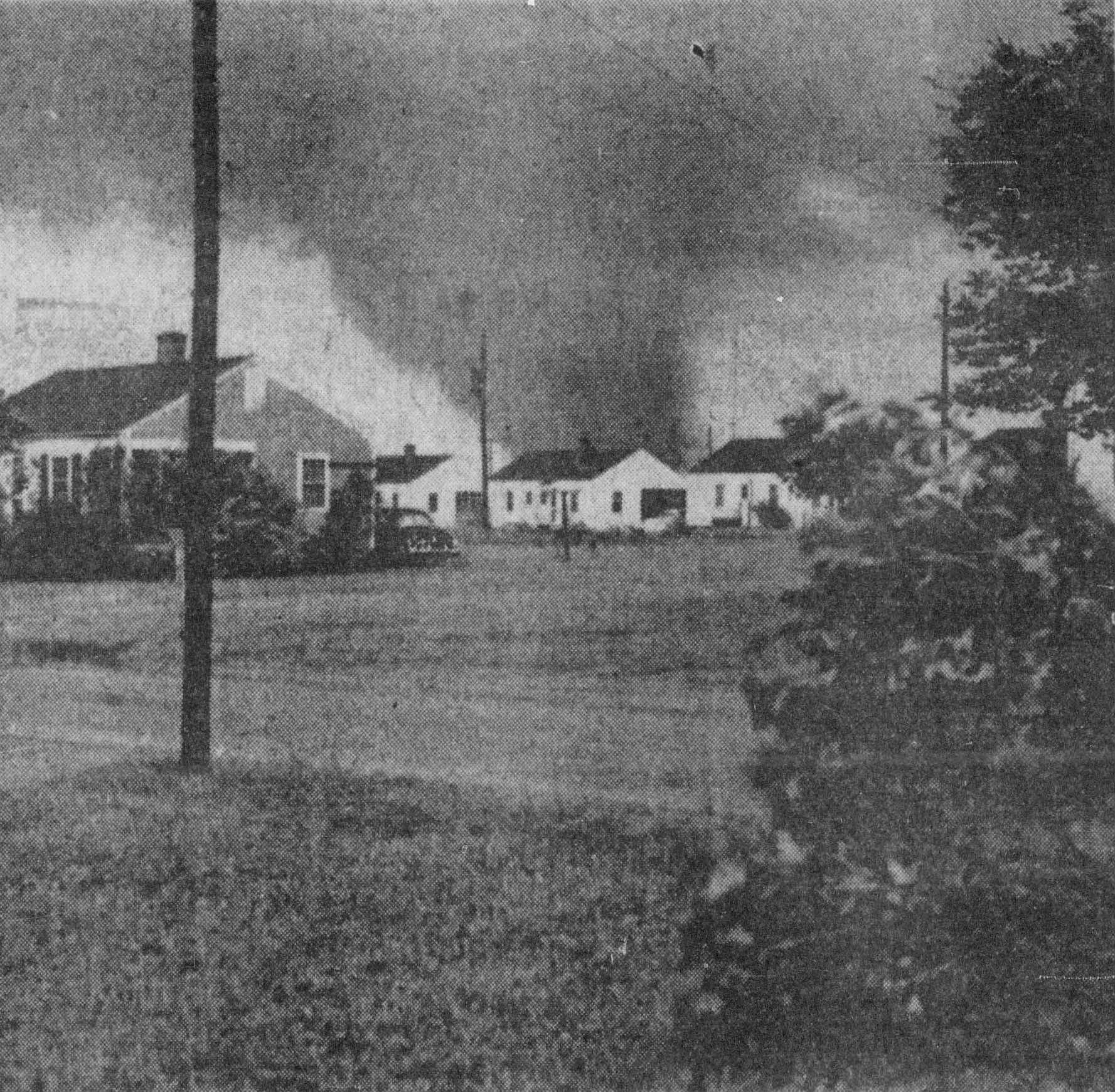
A large F4 tornado approaching Warner Robins, Georgia on April 30.

A major tornado outbreak sequence struck areas from the Great Plains to the Southeast, producing 24 tornadoes, including five F4 tornadoes. On April 28, a deadly, mile wide F4 tornado struck north of San Antonio in the town of Wetmore, Texas, killing two and injuring 15. The worst event occurred on April 30, when a large F4 tornado killed 18 and injured 300 in Warner Robins, Georgia. Two F4 tornadoes touched down in Alabama on May 1, causing nine deaths and 15 injuries. The outbreak ended on May 2, but not before another F4 tornado killed four and injured eight northeast of Decatur, Tennessee. Overall, the outbreak killed 36 people and injured 361.

== May ==
There were 94 tornadoes confirmed in the US in May.

=== May 9–11 ===
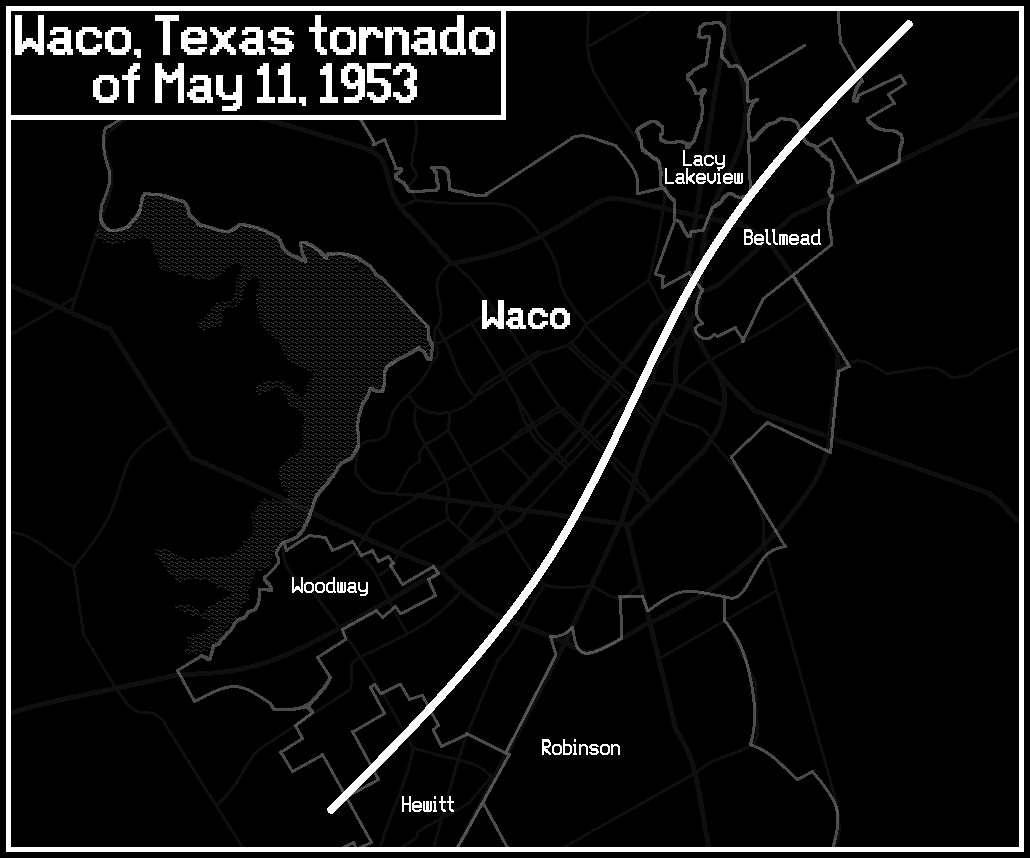
A map showing the track of the F5 tornado that struck Waco, Texas on May 11.

FU	F0	F1	F2	F3	F4	F5
0	1	15	8	4	4	1

A violent outbreak of at least 33 tornadoes struck the Great Plains and the Upper Mississippi Valley in Early-May just a week after the previous outbreak ended. On May 9, a large, long-tracked, half mile wide F3 tornado hit Milligan, Friend, and Milford, Nebraska, killing five and injuring 82. May 10 saw three F4 tornadoes strike Iowa. The third F4 tornado ended up being an extremely long-tracked tornado family that moved through Iowa, Minnesota, and Wisconsin on a 162 mi (261 km) path. It struck the towns of Chester, Iowa, Wykoff, Dover, St. Charles, Crystal Spring and Minneiska, Minnesota, and Cochrane, Waumandee, Lookout, Strum, Foster, Ludington, Edson, Stanley, Brownsville, and Gilman, Taylor County, Wisconsin. This family consisted of at least five tornadoes, killing two and injuring 24. Tornado activity on May 11 began with a .5 mile wide F4 tornado striking areas between Grape Creek and San Angelo, Texas, killing 13 and injuring 159. Later that day, the first officially rated F5 tornado in US history obliterated Downtown Waco, destroying or collapsing many of the structures and tossing numerous vehicles. 114 were killed and 597 were injured, making it the deadliest tornado in Texas history. Overall, the outbreak killed 144 and injured 895.

=== May 16–19 ===
FU	F0	F1	F2	F3	F4	F5
0	4	4	7	2	0	0

Widely scattered tornadoes struck numerous areas across the US. On May 16, an F2 tornado developed within a squall line near Church Point, Louisiana and moved northeastward through Lewisburg, parts of Opelousas, and Point Barre. It destroyed several homes and blew down warehouse walls and an oil derrick. Three people were injured. Later, an F3 tornado struck the Porter Springs Community and Wesley Chapel near Crockett, Texas, destroying 12 homes and 32 other buildings with an additional 18 homes and 6 other buildings damaged. One person was killed and eight others were injured (the CDNS report list three injuries). On May 17, a long-tracked F3 tornado moved through Rayville, Epps, and Wilman, Louisiana, injuring 17 people before it was lost after crossing into the Mississippi marshlands. On May 19, a rare F2 "freak 'twister'" struck Orland, California. Although there were no casualties, considerable damage occurred. The tornado wrecked the 120-foot-long (37 m) shop building of the Lambert Chevrolet Plant was wrecked, lifted the roof off the Aletto Building before setting it back down on the building, and lifted and moved a chicken house while causing only minimal damage to it while also throwing milk cans from a truck nearby. Overall, the 17 tornadoes during the period killed one and injured 30.

=== May 20–21 (United States and Canada) ===
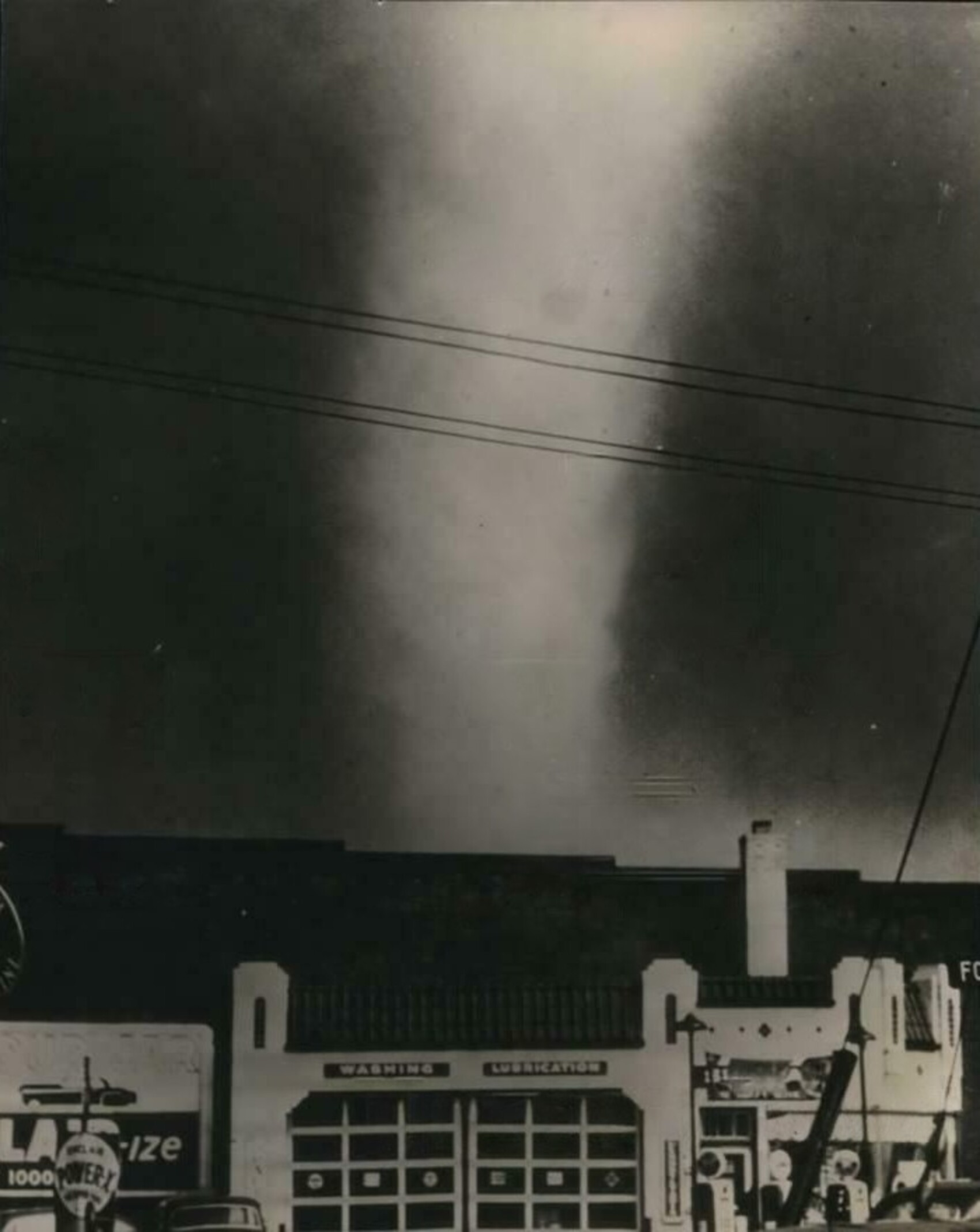
A large tornado as it tracked through Port Huron, Michigan on May 21.

FU	F0	F1	F2	F3	F4	F5
0	0	0	0	2	1	0

Three intense tornadoes struck Iowa, Michigan, and Ontario over the course of two days. On May 20, two long-tracked F3 tornadoes struck Iowa, killing one and injuring seven. The next day, a violent long-tracked F4 tornado struck the cities of Port Huron, Michigan and Sarnia, Ontario, killing seven and injuring 117. At least nine more tornadoes were reported in Ontario, but none were confirmed. Overall, the outbreak killed eight and injured 123.

=== May 29 ===
FU	F0	F1	F2	F3	F4	F5
0	0	3	5	0	0	1

An outbreak of nine tornadoes struck the Great Plains. The worst tornado was a 600 yd (550 m) wide F5 tornado that struck Fort Rice, North Dakota (although some experts like Grazulis dispute this, claiming that it was an F4 tornado; Grazulis did rate the tornado F5 later on). The tornado completely leveled a church and threw car parts up to .5 miles (0.80 km). In the end, 20 of the 22 injuries and both deaths from the outbreak came from this tornado.

== June ==
There were 110 tornadoes confirmed in the US in June.

=== June 7–9 ===
FU	F0	F1	F2	F3	F4	F5
0	14	10	13	7	5	1

Less than one month after the deadly Waco outbreak, an even deadlier tornado outbreak struck the Great Plains, Great Lakes, and even New England in early June. It started on June 7, when a tornado outbreak spawned 34 tornadoes across the Great Plains. The strongest and only fatal tornado of the day was a .25 mi (0.40 km) wide F4 tornado that struck areas near Arcadia, Nebraska. It injured no one, but killed 11, including an entire family of 10 at a swept away farm. In Iowa, a 200 yd (180 m) wide F2 tornado traveled 116 mi (187 km), destroying several barns, but causing no casualties. In all, tornadoes on June 7 killed 11 and injured 19.

While June 8 had fewer tornadoes than the previous day, the nine tornadoes that hit Michigan and Ohio that day were stronger and deadlier. The first fatal tornado of the day was an F4 tornado that struck Temperance, Michigan before moving through areas south of Erie, killing four and injuring 17. The only Ohio tornado of the day then touched down and became a long-tracked F4 tornado family (which may have reached F5 intensity in Cygnet, Jerry City, or both) that struck the cities of Fremont, Sandusky, Elyria, and even Western Cleveland, causing catastrophic damage, killing 17, and injuring 379 on its 118 mi (190 km) path. Back in Michigan, an F3 tornado killed one and injured five between Sharon Hollow and Ann Arbor. At the same time, another F3 tornado struck Highland Charter Township, injuring 11. A massive, 833 yd (762 m) wide F2 tornado then hit the north side of Oscoda, killing four and injuring 13. An F3 tornado then touched down and caused considerable damage on the south side of Spruce, although it was the only significant (F2+) tornado of the day to not cause casualties. The strongest and deadliest tornado then touched down and struck the northern suburbs of Flint, Michigan in the community of Beecher at F5 intensity with little to no warning. The large 833 yd (762 m) wide tornado obliterated and swept away many homes and a staggering 113 people lost their lives in the town alone. The tornado killed a total of 116 people and injured 844 others. After that tornado lifted, the same cell produced the final tornado of the day. The large, long tracked, 833 yd (762 m) wide F4 tornado carved a 33.8 mi (54.4 km) path of destruction through rural Lapeer and St. Clair Counties, injuring 23, thus becoming the only violent tornado of the outbreak sequence to not cause any fatalities. In all, 12 tornadoes touched down on June 8, killing 142 people and injuring 1,293 others.

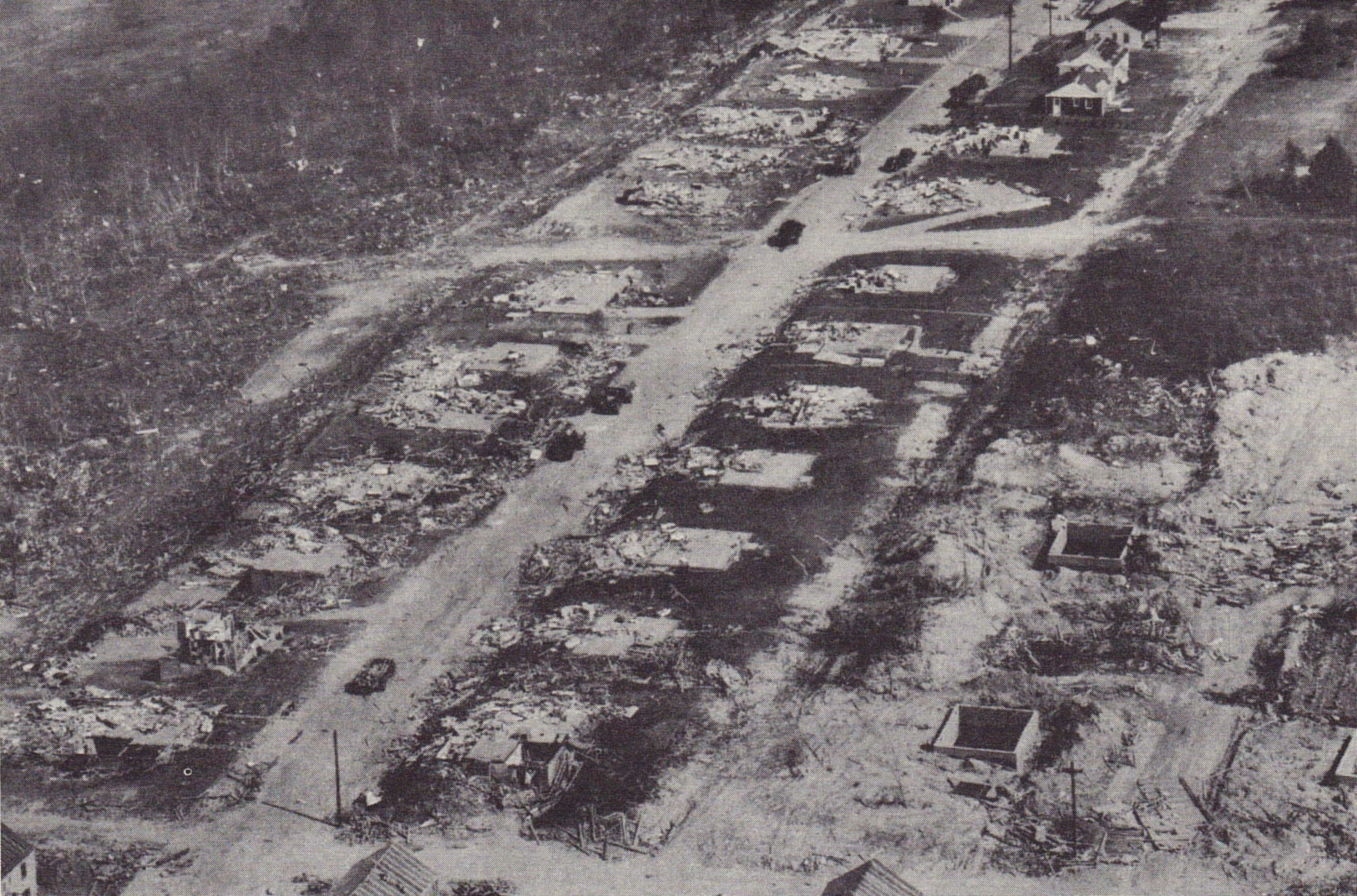
F4 damage to homes in Worcester, Massachusetts

June 9 produced a small, but unusually intense outbreak of four tornadoes in New England. Despite knowing that there was the possibility of tornadoes that day, the National Weather Service in Boston had only issued a Severe Thunderstorm Watch, fearing that the mention of a tornado threat would cause widespread panic. This proved to be a fatal mistake when a violent, 900 yd (820 m) wide F4 tornado struck Worcester, Massachusetts with no warning. The hardest hit area was Assumption College (building is now the Quinsigamond Community College), and its surrounding neighborhoods, where 42 people were killed. The college building was reduced by three floors and numerous homes were obliterated, leaving some to speculate that the tornado reached F5 intensity in this area. A tornado warning was not issued until the tornado was lifting 80 minutes after it had touched down. By then, 94 people were dead and 1,228 others were injured. In the end, the tornadoes of June 9 in New Hampshire and Massachusetts killed 94 and injured 1,250.

Overall, at least 50 tornadoes touched down, including six violent tornadoes. The outbreak injured 2,562 people while killing 247, accounting for a little over 47% of the fatalities from 1953 alone. Many revolutionary changes were made to improve both the warning and radar systems as a result of this outbreak.

=== June 27 ===
FU	F0	F1	F2	F3	F4	F5
0	0	2	2	0	0	1

A small, but damaging outbreak of five tornadoes struck Iowa and North Dakota. The worst tornado was a violent F5 tornado that destroyed four farms east of Anita, Iowa, with virtually nothing left at one of them. Heavy machinery was thrown hundreds of feet, and boards were driven into trees. One person was killed and two others were injured. As a whole, the outbreak killed one and injured five.

== July ==
There were 32 tornadoes confirmed in the US in July.

== August ==
There were 24 tornadoes confirmed in the US in August.

== September ==
There were 5 tornadoes confirmed in the US in September.

== October ==
There were 6 tornadoes confirmed in the US in October.

== November ==
There were 12 tornadoes confirmed in the US in November.

== December ==
There were 21 tornadoes confirmed in the US in December.

=== December 1–6 ===
FU	F0	F1	F2	F3	F4	F5
0	0	4	10	3	1	1

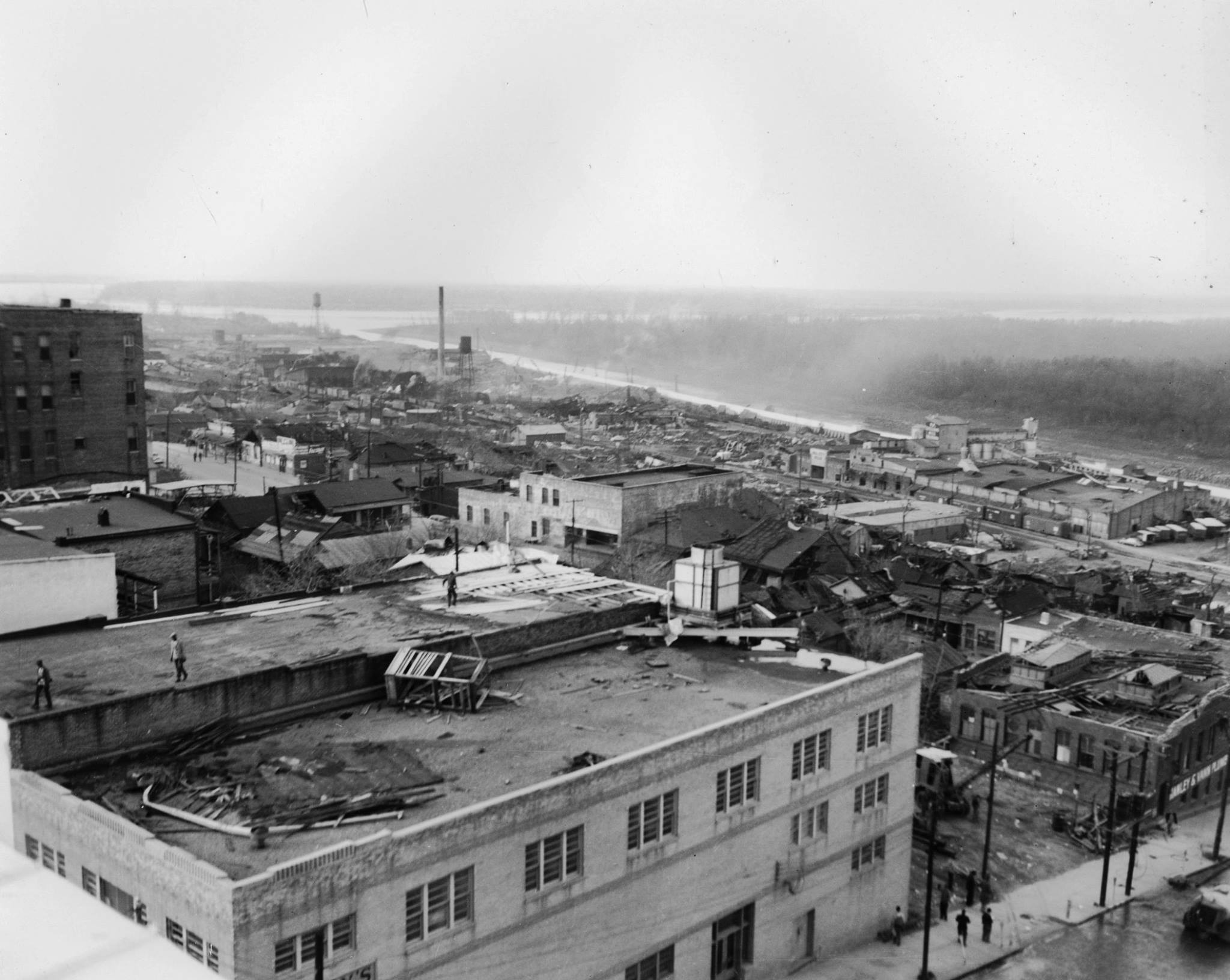
Damage to downtown Vicksburg, MS after a violent tornado on December 5.

Although usually a quiet month, the first six days of December were extremely destructive and deadly as a series of single damaging tornado days and small outbreaks combined into a tornado outbreak sequence of 19 tornadoes across the South. On December 2, a brief, but strong F2 tornado killed two and injured five west of Navasota, Texas. The next day, a 300 yd (270 m) wide, violent F4 tornado tracked 85.5 mi (137.6 km) through four Parishes in Louisiana. Passing northwest of Alexandria, the tornado killed nine and injured 50. The worst day of the outbreak sequence occurred on December 5, when four strong to violent tornadoes struck the Lower Mississippi Valley. The strongest and deadliest tornado was an 880 yd (800 m) wide violent F5 tornado that struck Vicksburg, Mississippi. Many buildings were leveled, although most were frail in nature, causing some experts to rate this as an F4 tornado. Regardless, 38 people were killed and 270 others were injured along the 9 mi (14 km) path of destruction. In fact, tornadoes on this day killed 38 and injured 292 people alone. In the end, the outbreak sequence killed 49 and injured 404.

== See also ==
- Tornado
  - Tornadoes by year
  - Tornado records
  - Tornado climatology
  - Tornado myths
- List of tornado outbreaks
  - List of F5 and EF5 tornadoes
  - List of North American tornadoes and tornado outbreaks
  - List of 21st-century Canadian tornadoes and tornado outbreaks
  - List of European tornadoes and tornado outbreaks
  - List of tornadoes and tornado outbreaks in Asia
  - List of Southern Hemisphere tornadoes and tornado outbreaks
  - List of tornadoes striking downtown areas
  - List of tornadoes with confirmed satellite tornadoes
- Tornado intensity
  - Fujita scale
  - Enhanced Fujita scale
