= Worcester tornado =

1953 tornado in Massachusetts, U.S.

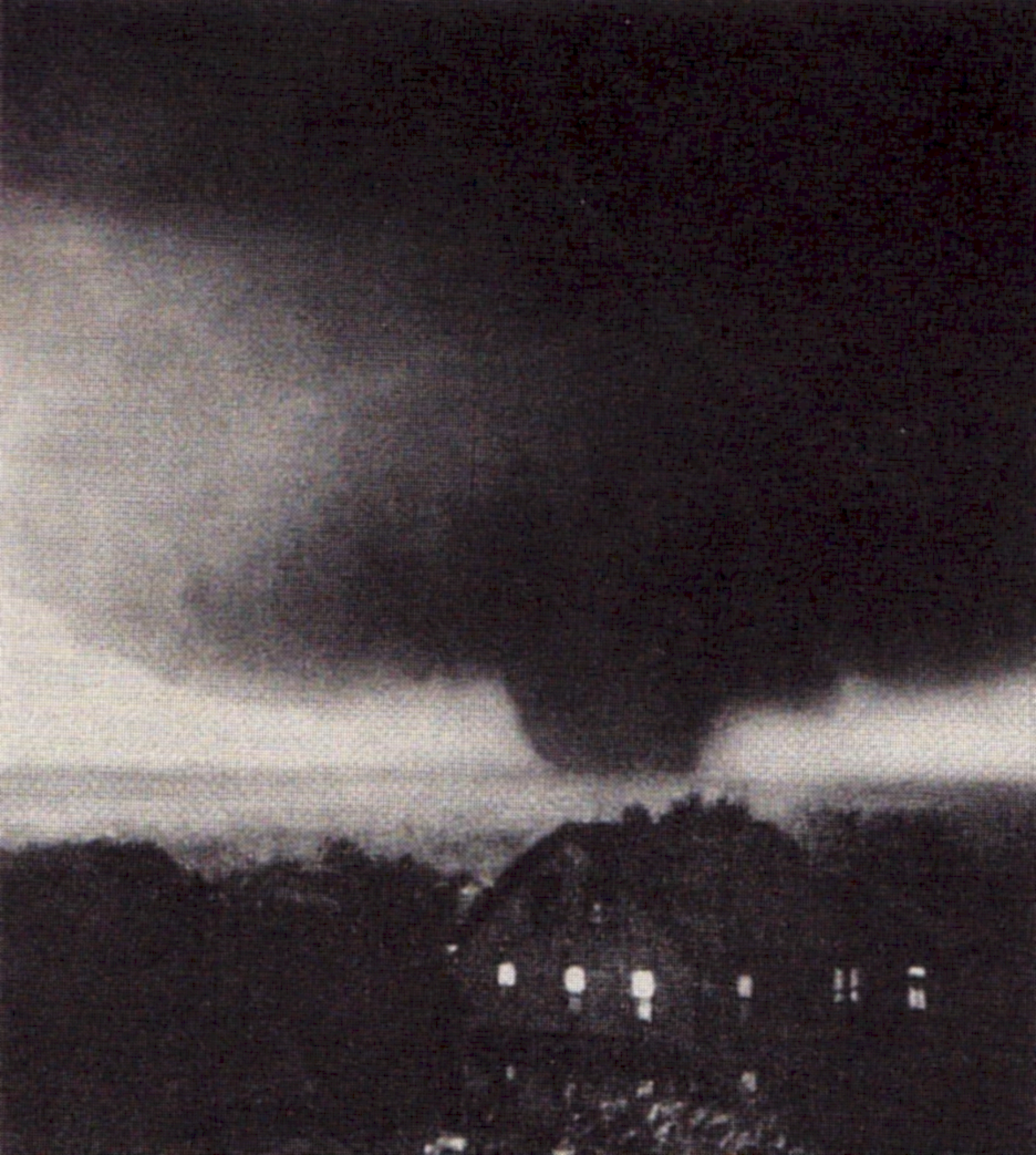
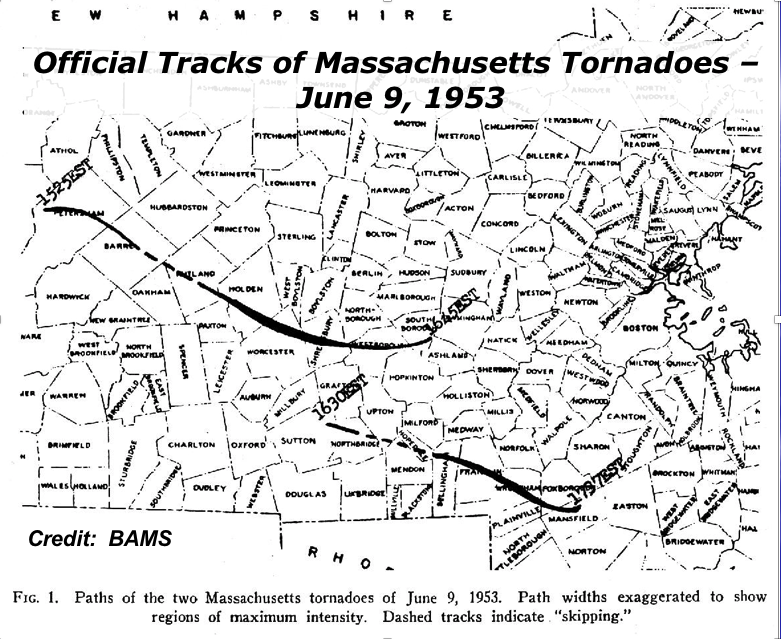
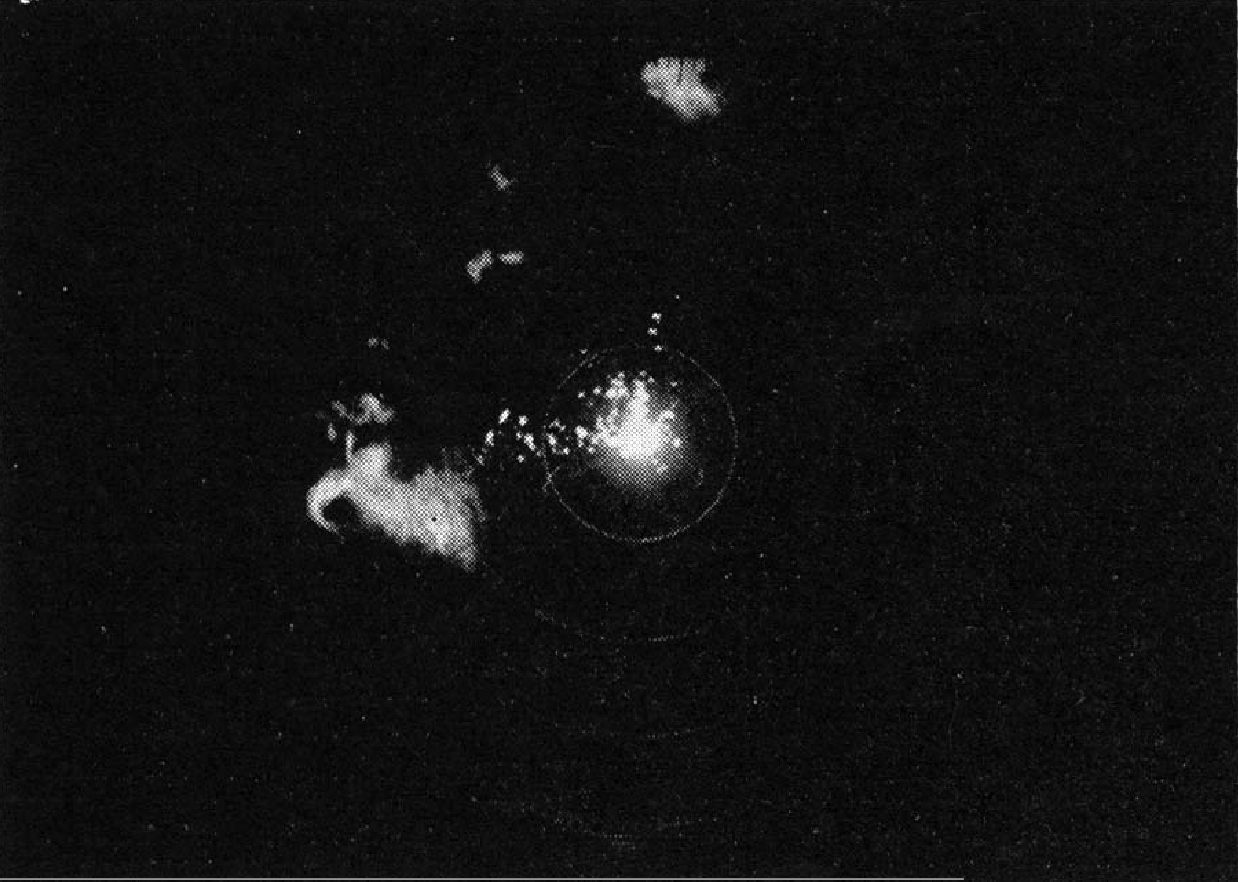
- Clockwise from top: A photograph of the violent tornado as seen tracking near Lake Quinsingamond as seen from the southwest – A radar image of the Supercell that produced the Worcester tornado – The tracks of the Massachusetts tornadoes of June 9, the top path is the track of the Worcester tornado

Meteorological history
- Formed: June 9, 1953, 4:25 p.m. EDT (UTC−04:00)
- Dissipated: June 9, 1953, 5:43 p.m. EDT (UTC−04:00)
- Duration: 1 hour and 18 minutes

F4 tornado
- on the Fujita scale
- Max width: 1,760 yd (1.00 mi; 1.61 km)
- Path length: 48 mi (77 km)
- Highest winds: Official intensity: 207–260 mph (333–418 km/h); Measured winds: 250–300 mph (400–480 km/h) (Estimate from the National Weather Service)

Overall effects
- Fatalities: 94
- Injuries: 1,288
- Damage: $52.193 million (1953 USD) (Note: All losses are in 1953 USD unless otherwise noted.)
- Areas affected: Worcester County in Massachusetts, principally in and near Worcester, Shrewsbury, Southborough, and Westborough
- Part of the Tornado outbreak of June 7–9, 1953 and tornado outbreaks of 1953

On Tuesday, June 9, 1953, a rare, violent and deadly tornado struck the city of Worcester, Massachusetts, and surrounding areas. Part of a larger and devastating tornado outbreak, the tornado, known as the Worcester tornado, remained on the ground for 78 minutes, covering a distance of 48 miles (77 km), injuring 1,288 people and killing 94, making it one of the deadliest tornadoes in U.S. history, and the deadliest tornado to ever hit New England. A total of 4,000 buildings were damaged or destroyed, and the National Weather Service estimated that 10,000 people were left homeless. The tornado caused $52.193 million ($590 million in 2023 when adjusted for inflation) in damage, ranking it the costliest tornado recorded in its time.

At approximately 4:25 p.m. EDT, the tornado developed in a forest near the town of Petersham and moved through Barre, where two people were killed. It then moved through the western suburbs of Worcester, where 11 more people were killed. The storm then passed through Worcester, destroying Assumption College and several other buildings, killing 60 people. After striking Worcester, it killed 21 more people in the towns of Shrewsbury, Southborough, and Westborough, before dissipating over Framingham.

== Meteorological synopsis ==
=== The buildup to the storm ===
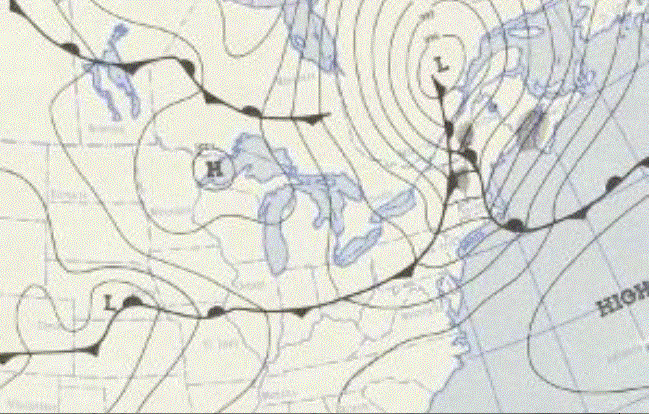
Surface weather analysis of the New England Region, June 9, 1953.

On June 7, 1953, a strong shortwave trough moved eastward over the Rocky Mountains, bringing with it strong upward motions that induced lee cyclogenesis: the formation of a low-pressure area over eastern Colorado. The combination of the warm, unstable air in place over the Great Plains and an elevated mixed layer from the desert Southwest led to conditions favorable for severe thunderstorms and tornadoes. More than 30 tornadoes occurred that day across Colorado, Kansas, Nebraska, and Iowa, including a violent tornado that killed 11 people near Arcadia, Nebraska. On June 8, the storm system moved northeast. These conditions led to several tornadoes in the states of Michigan, Ohio, and Nebraska, most notably the Flint–Beecher tornado. The storm killed 116 people in the northern Flint suburb of Beecher and injured 844. In addition, seven other tornadoes across the region caused 449 more injuries and 26 more fatalities. After the Fujita scale came into use, the Flint–Beecher tornado was rated F5.

On the morning of June 9, the low-pressure system had moved northeastward into Ontario near the south end of Hudson Bay. An occluded front extended south from it, towards a triple point with a warm front and cold front near the northern end of Lake Superior. The warm front extended southeast across New York, Pennsylvania, and New Jersey and moved northeast throughout the day, bringing warm, moist, and unstable air into the New England area. In the mid-atmosphere, the elevated mixed layer was still in place, keeping storms from forming earlier in the day before maximum temperatures were reached. By afternoon, temperatures in Worcester had reached 80 °F (27 °C), with a dew point of 66 °F (19 °C); in combination with cold air aloft, this meant atmospheric conditions were very unstable and conducive to severe weather. Furthermore, amplified wind shear was present in the afternoon of June 9, making conditions in the atmosphere supportive of supercell development and tornado formation.

Forecasters at the National Weather Service office in Boston believed there was a possibility for tornado activity in the area; however, they did not include such an advisory in their forecast, fearing that people might panic unnecessarily. Since 1953 was the first year tornado and severe thunderstorm warnings were used, forecasters compromised and issued the first severe thunderstorm watch in the history of Massachusetts. Most news reports only mentioned possible thunderstorms. This caused the tornado to strike with very little warning to the residents.

== Tornado summary ==
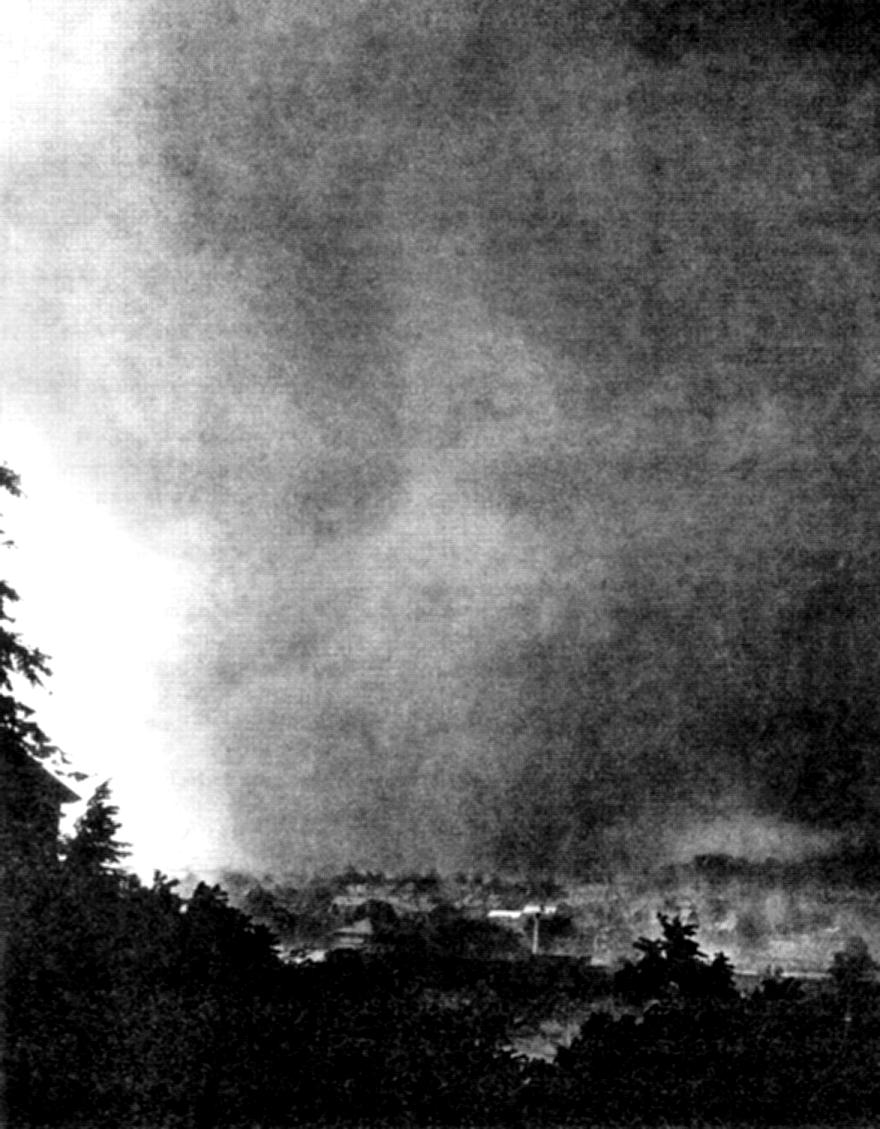
The tornado with twin funnels as seen from the shore of Indian Lake at 5:08 p.m. The photographer was two miles (3.2 km) from the tornado.

The tornado first developed over the Quabbin Reservoir in Petersham, Massachusetts, at 4:25 p.m EDT. It was witnessed by boaters on the reservoir, who initially saw three funnels. After brushing Petersham (occasionally with twin funnels several hundred feet apart), the tornado tracked southeastwards and slammed into the rural towns of Barre and Rutland, with two fatalities occurring at each location. The massive tornado tore directly through suburban Holden, completely wiping out the Brentwood Estates subdivision and resulting in multiple fatalities.

At 5:08 p.m., the tornado entered Worcester and grew to a width of one mile (1.6 km). The damage was tremendous in Worcester, the second-largest city in Massachusetts, and some areas faced the worst damage compared to that from any other U.S. tornado. Hardest-hit areas included Assumption College (now Quinsigamond Community College), where a priest and two nuns were killed. The main building's three-foot (0.91 m) thick brick walls were reduced by three floors, and the landmark tower lost three stories. A nearby storage tank, weighing several tons, was lofted and tossed across a road by the tornado. The nearby Burncoat Hill neighborhood saw heavy devastation (especially on its western slope), but it was the Uncatena-Great Brook Valley neighborhoods to the east of Burncoat Hill that were razed, with the tornado possibly reaching F5 intensity in this area. Houses and rows of homes vanished, with the debris granulated and scattered well away from their foundations. Forty people died in the Uncatena-Great Brook Valley areas alone. A 12-ton (10.89 metric-ton) bus was picked up, rolled over several times, and thrown against the newly constructed Curtis Apartments in Great Brook Valley, resulting in the deaths of two passengers. The Curtis Apartments blueprints were blown all the way to Duxbury (near Plymouth), 75 miles (121 km) away. Across Boylston Street from the Curtis Apartments, the Brookside Home Farm, a city-operated dairy facility and laundry, sustained total damage, with six men and the herd of 80 Holsteins killed. Houses and bodies were blown into Lake Quinsigamond. The six fatalities at Brookside were the most in any one building in the tornado's path.

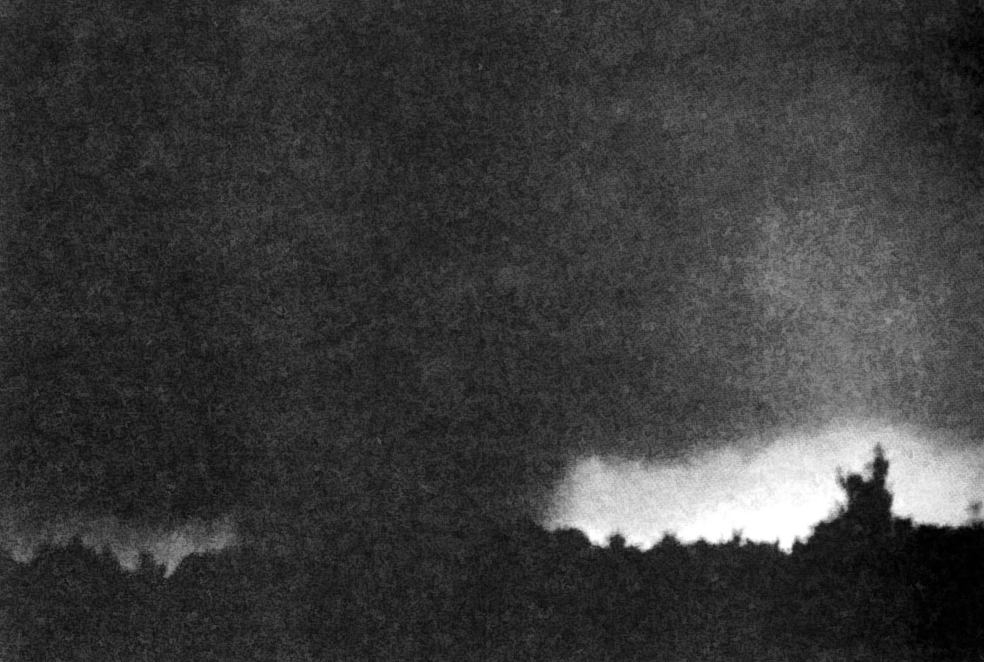
The tornado as it tracked through Shrewsbury after leaving Worcester.

At approximately 5:20 p.m., the funnel moved into Shrewsbury and maintained a width between a quarter and half of a mile throughout much of the town, killing 12. The heaviest concentration of damage was in the section between Maple Avenue and Grafton Street, less than a mile from the center of Shrewsbury. Many homes were completely destroyed, and areas of forest were destroyed as well. The tornado was still in full-force when it moved through downtown Westborough (five deaths), where it began curving towards the northeast in its final leg. In the storm's final moments, three people perished in the collapse of the Fayville Post Office in Southborough. Coincidentally, around the time it ended at 5:45 p.m., a tornado warning was issued, albeit too late. A separate F3 tornado also struck about the same time the warning was issued in the nearby communities of Sutton, Northbridge, Mendon, Bellingham, Franklin, Wrentham and Mansfield in Massachusetts, injuring 17 persons. Another tornado did minor damage and caused several injuries in Fremont and Exeter in Rockingham County, New Hampshire; other smaller tornadoes occurred in Colrain, Massachusetts, and Rollinsford, New Hampshire.

Baseball-size hail was reported in a score of communities affected by the Worcester supercell. Airborne debris was strewn eastward, reaching the Blue Hill Meteorological Observatory 35 miles (56 km) away, and even out into Massachusetts Bay and the Atlantic Ocean. The farthest documented distance of tornado debris was an item that blew from Holden to Eastham on Cape Cod, a distance of 110 miles (180 km), one of the farthest from a U.S. tornado.

== Aftermath ==
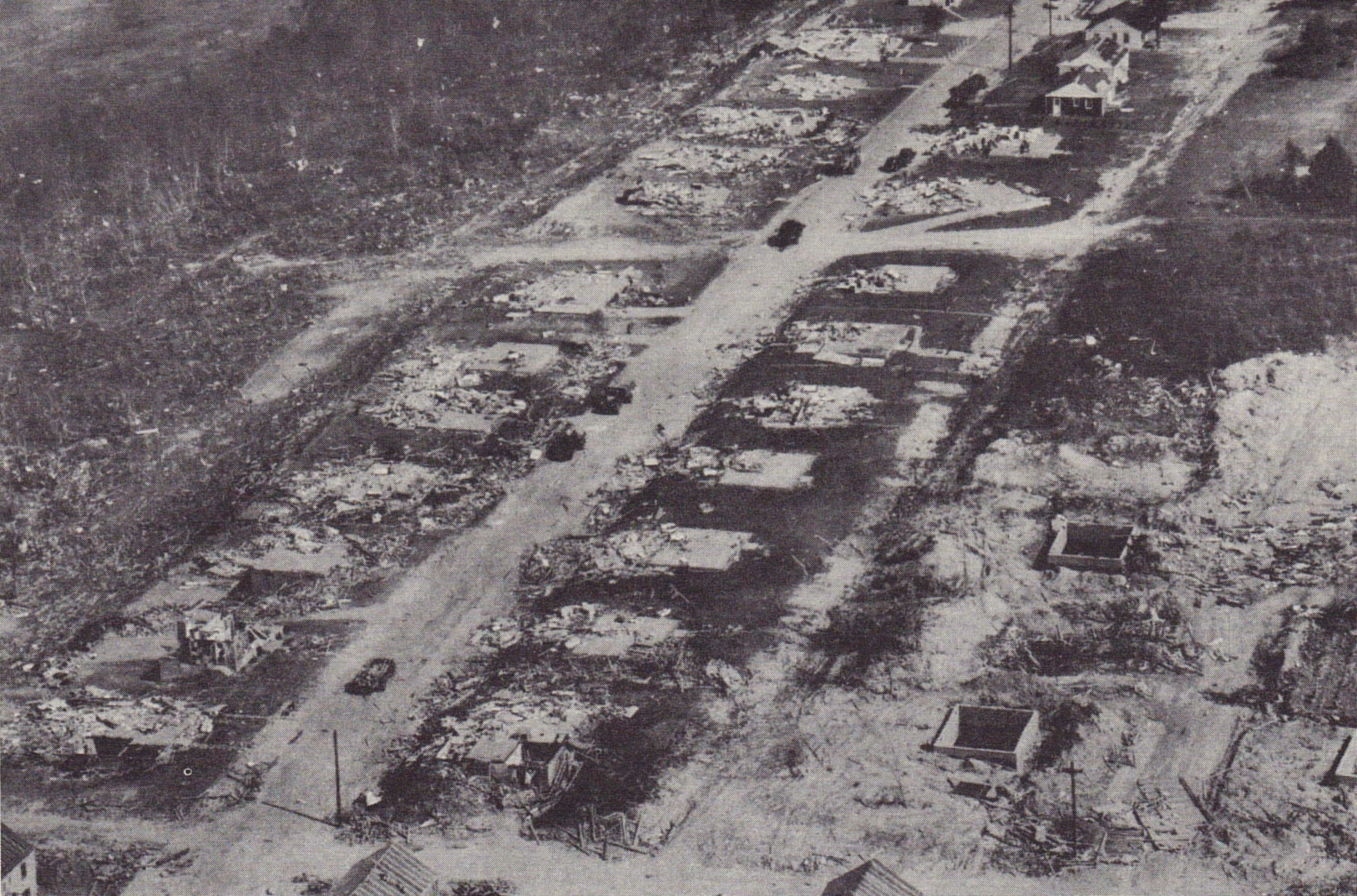
F4 tornado damage from the Worcester tornado.

The Worcester and New England tornado outbreak led to major changes in how severe weather was monitored in the United States. In response to the storm, the Storm Prediction Center was reorganized on June 17, 1953, and efforts continued to develop a nationwide system of weather radar and trained storm spotters. After this tornado, the 2011 tornado in Joplin, Missouri, was the only tornado in the United States to cause more than 100 fatalities.

The strength of the Worcester tornado itself has been debated for decades. Official records had classified it as an F4 tornado. However, damage observed in several communities, including Rutland, Holden, Worcester, Shrewsbury, and Westborough, appeared similar to damage typically associated with an F5 tornado.

Due to this disagreement, the National Weather Service convened a panel of experts in Spring of 2005 to review the available evidence. The panel considered whether the tornado should be reclassified as F5 but decided in the summer of 2005 to retain the original F4 rating.

The panel concluded that many of the destroyed homes could not be examined closely enough to determine how well they had been anchored. Some buildings, particularly those built in the postwar period, may have been more vulnerable to extreme winds than older structures. Without detailed engineering data, the panel determined it was not possible to reliably distinguish between F4 and F5 damage, since the visible effects would likely appear similar.

== See also ==
- List of disasters in Massachusetts by death toll
- Tornadoes of 1953
- 2011 Springfield tornado
- Great Barrington tornado

== Sources ==
- Chittick, William F. (2003). The Worcester tornado: June 9, 1953. W.F. Chittick. p. 19.
- Pletcher, Larry (2006). Massachusetts Disasters: True Stories of Tragedy and Survival. Globe Pequot. p. 240. ISBN 0-7627-3988-6.
- Wallace, Anthony F.C. (1956). Tornado in Worcester; an exploratory study of individual and community behavior in an extreme situation. National Academy of Sciences – via Internet Archive. (Wallace's classic study on the impact of the Worcester tornado.)

| Preceded by 1953 Waco tornado (1953) | Costliest U.S. tornadoes on Record; June 9, 1953 | Succeeded by Topeka, KS (1966) |
