= 1953 Waco tornado =

1953 F5 tornado in Texas

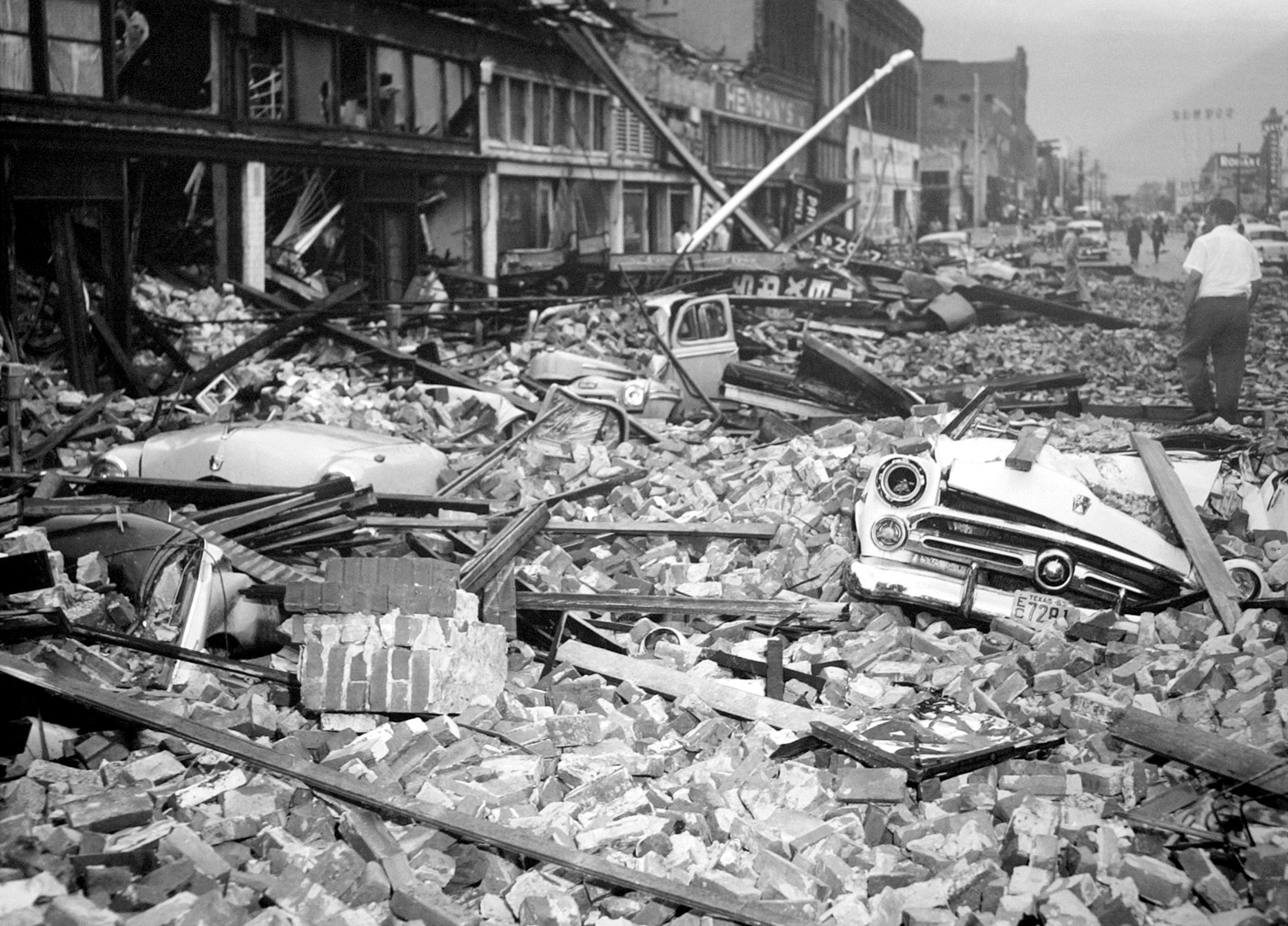
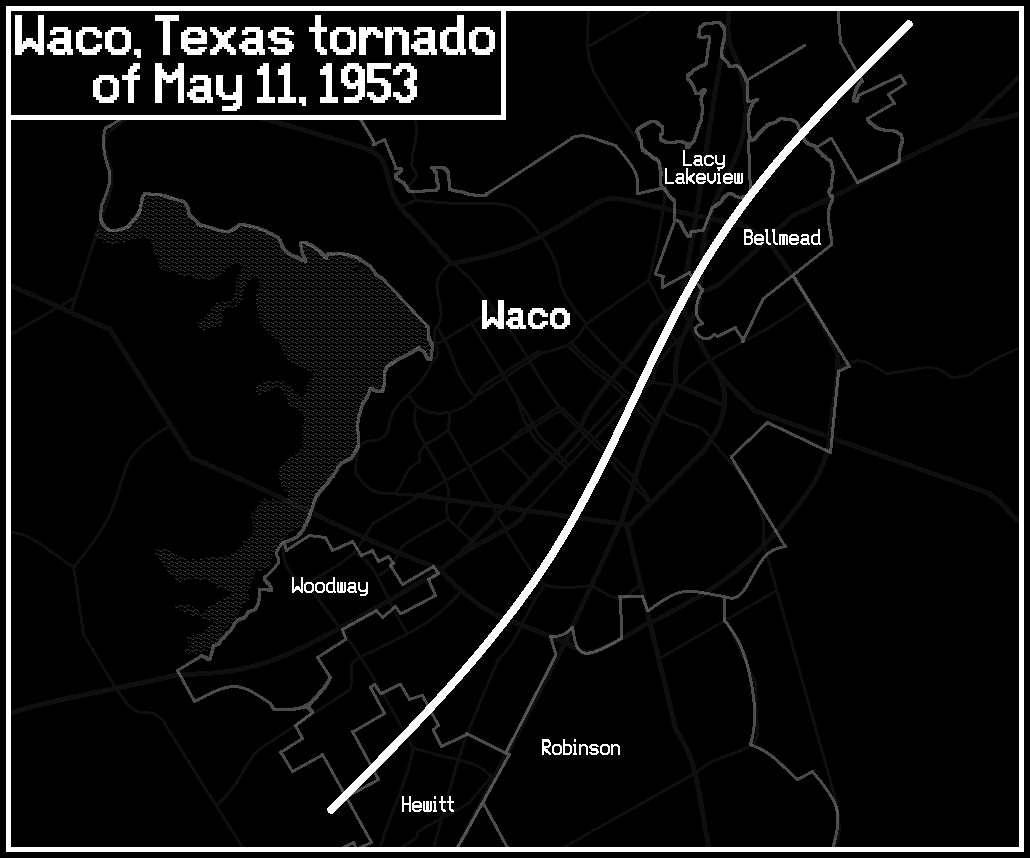
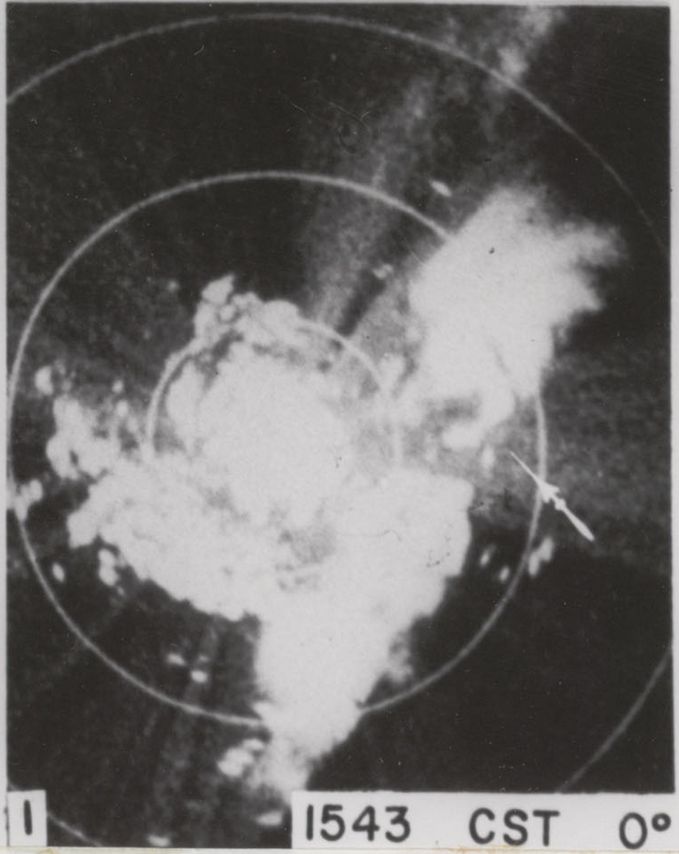
- Clockwise from top: Damage to downtown Waco after the tornado; A radar image of the storms that would produce the tornado; The track of the tornado.

Meteorological history
- Formed: May 11, 1953 , 4:10 p.m. CST (22:10 UTC)
- Dissipated: May 11, 1953 , 4:45 p.m. CST (22:10 UTC)
- Duration: 35 minutes

F5 tornado
- on the Fujita scale
- Highest winds: >261 mph (420 km/h)

Overall effects
- Fatalities: 114
- Injuries: 597
- Damage: $41 million (1953 USD) (Note: All losses are in 1953 USD unless otherwise noted.) $626 million (2025 USD)
- Areas affected: Lorena, Waco, Bellmead and Axtell, Texas
- Part of the Tornado outbreak of May 9–11, 1953 and tornadoes of 1953

On the afternoon of May 11, 1953, a powerful and deadly tornado directly struck the city of Waco, Texas, killing 114 people and injuring 597 more. The tornado was the deadliest to hit Texas since 1900, with the same amount of fatalities but more injuries than the 1902 Goliad, Texas, tornado. The tornado eventually received an F5 rating, one of five in the devastating 1953 tornado season. It was the second deadliest tornado of that season, behind the 1953 Flint–Beecher tornado. It was also the first tornado to be officially rated F5 in the United States.

== Meteorological synopsis ==
May 11 was a warm, moist day, with dewpoints in the lower 70s and temperatures ranging from the mid 70s inland to low 80s along the coast. Storms earlier near Abilene had produced outflow boundaries, and those boundaries were thought to have an effect on tornadogenesis later on by creating enhanced wind shear. Eventually, storms developed along a dryline draped over much of central Texas, with one storm producing an F4 in San Angelo, killing 13 people. Due to conducive conditions for severe weather, the U.S. Weather Bureau (later the National Weather Service) Weather Forecast Office in New Orleans issued a tornado alert covering sections of Central and West Texas. It is believed that the warnings reduced casualties in the San Angelo F4, but had minimal influence on Waco. Eventually, a high-precipitation supercell produced a tornado southwest of Waco.

== Tornado summary ==
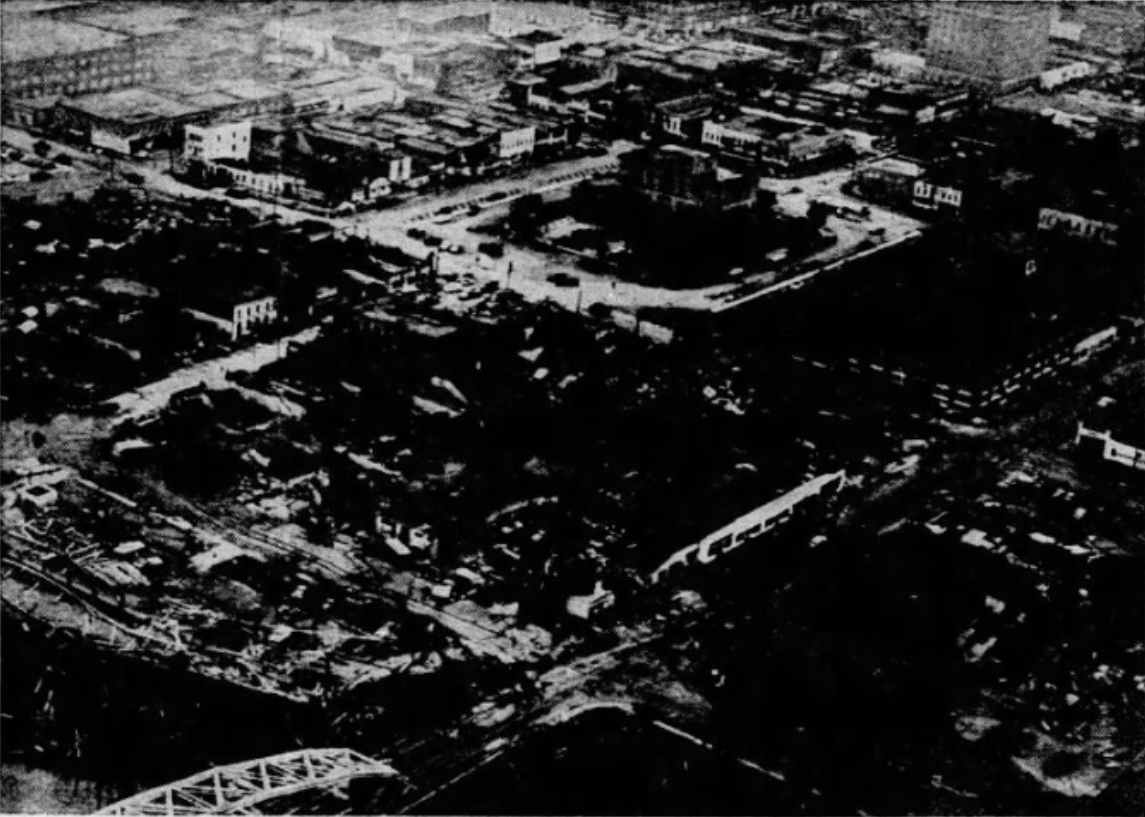
An aerial view of Waco's downtown area after the tornado.

The tornado first formed around 4:10 p.m. CST (22:10 UTC) about three miles (5 km) north-northwest of the Lorena community. It quickly began damaging structures, destroying a home near Lorena as it tracked north-northeastward. The tornado produced F5 damage outside of the city of Waco.

As it neared Waco, operators of weather radar at Texas A&M University detected a hook echo in association with the parent supercell. This was one of the first times that radar linked tornadogenesis with hook-echo signatures. However, because heavy rain obscured the tornado, it was largely invisible to people in its path. The high-precipitation nature of the parent storm may have heightened the death toll in Waco by delaying appropriate action. The time of day might also have increased the death toll, as the tornado struck downtown at the end of the work day. The storm also generated baseball-sized hail in its path. The tornado passed close to Hewitt before entering downtown Waco.

As the thunderstorm began pounding the city with rain, many people on the streets crowded into local buildings for shelter, yet few of the buildings in downtown Waco were constructed sturdily enough to withstand the winds, so they collapsed almost immediately. Thirty people died in the R. T. Dennis building alone, and five others died while in their cars. Newer buildings with steel reinforcement, including the 22-story Amicable office building (now called the ALICO Building), weathered the storm. The Dr Pepper bottling plant, today the Dr Pepper Museum, also remained standing but sustained damage. Bricks from the collapsed structures piled up in the street to a depth of five feet (1.5 m). Some survivors were trapped under rubble for 14 or more hours; numerous bodies remained buried beneath piles of rubble, and for many days were unaccounted for. After devastating downtown Waco and travelling 23 miles, the tornado continued to the north-northeast and dissipated about five miles (8 km) west of Axtell. While the tornado destroyed homes outside the city, media largely focused on destruction in downtown Waco.

== Aftermath ==
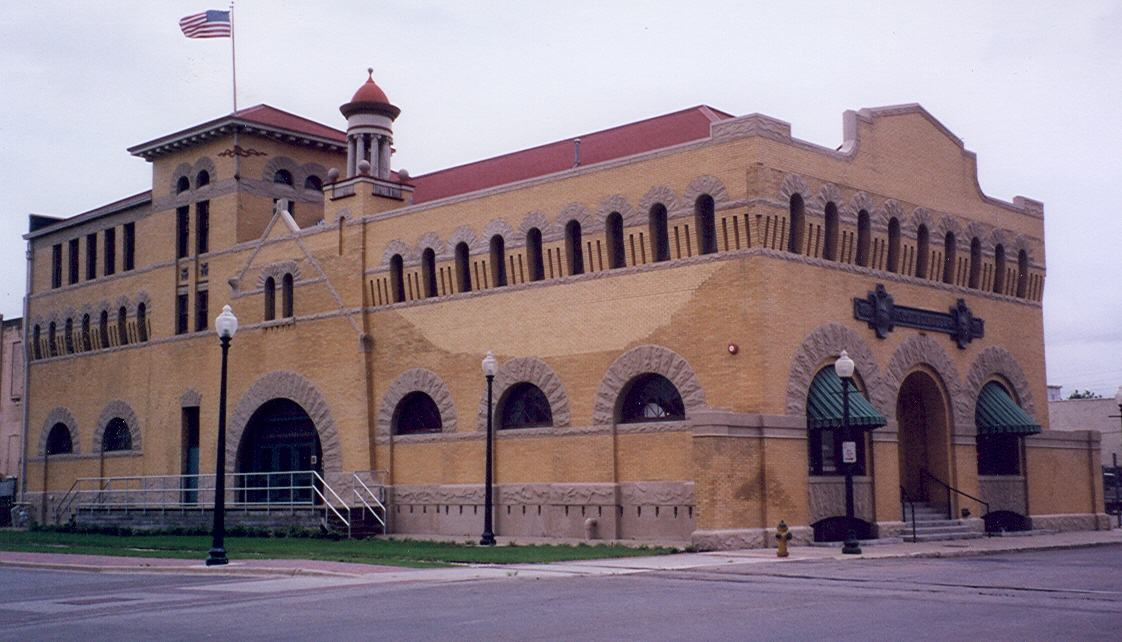
A tornado damage on the Dr Pepper Museum, the lighter bricks are the new walls following the tornado.

In all, 114 deaths occurred in the Waco area, with 597 injured, making it the deadliest tornado in Texas history. Damage costs were estimated at around $51 million. The tornado destroyed 196 businesses and factories. 150 homes were wrecked. Over 2,000 cars sustained at least some damage. The city received about $9 million (1953 USD) to help with recovery efforts, however poor organization proved to be a challenge. Initially, the tornado also severed communications between downtown Waco and outlying areas, so assistance was slow to arrive. Some survivors waited 14 hours to be rescued, and bodies took days to be recovered. The chaotic relief efforts eventually spurred greater coordination between civilians and local governments, leading to the development of civil defense. Within a week, reconstruction and rehabilitation had begun. Notably, the Waco event was one of the first instances that proved the effectiveness of radar in tracking tornadogenesis; coincidentally, another such case occurred later in the same year. A retrospective study of the tornado that struck Worcester, Massachusetts, on June 9 revealed that, as at Waco, local radar detected the hook echo that signified the tornado. Researchers concluded that improved communications, coupled with the formation of radar coverage, could lead to accurate tornado warnings, thereby reducing loss of life in future storms. This task proved especially important following the devastating loss of life at Waco and Worcester, along with the June 8 F5 tornado in Flint, Michigan, in the same year. The state of Texas supported the implementation of 20 radar facilities, each with a 200-mile-wide (320 km) radius, that proved successful in reducing death tolls in later tornadoes. The system was known as the Texas Radar Tornado Warning Network and also included communications between weather officials, storm spotters, and local officials. Thus the Waco tornado helped catalyze development of a nationwide severe weather warning system. Some areas never fully recovered from the tornado. In addition, a memorial was constructed to honor the fatalities of the tornado.

== See also ==
- List of F5 and EF5 tornadoes
- List of North American tornadoes and tornado outbreaks
- List of tornadoes striking downtown areas
- 1997 Jarrell tornado – an F5 tornado that caused some of the most intense tornado damage ever seen in Texas

== Sources ==
- Grazulis, Thomas P. (July 1993). Significant Tornadoes, 1680–1991: a Chronology and Analysis of Events. St. Johnsbury: The Tornado Project of Environmental Films. ISBN 1-879362-03-1.
- Grazulis, Thomas P. (2001). The Tornado: Nature's Ultimate Windstorm. Norman: University of Oklahoma Press. p. 141. ISBN 978-0-8061-3538-0.
