= Pilot Township, Vermilion County, Illinois =

Pilot Township
- Township
- Location in Vermilion County
- Coordinates: 40°13′01″N 87°51′03″W
- Country: United States
- State: Illinois
- County: Vermilion
- Created: 1851

Area
  - Total: 62.17 sq mi (161.0 km^{2})
  - Land: 62.16 sq mi (161.0 km^{2})
  - Water: 0.02 sq mi (0.052 km^{2}) 0.03%
- Elevation: 750 ft (230 m)

Population (2010)
  - Estimate (2016): 568
  - Density: 9.4/sq mi (3.6/km^{2})
- Time zone: UTC-6 (CST)
  - Summer (DST): UTC-5 (CDT)
- FIPS code: 17-183-59832

Pilot Township is a township in Vermilion County, Illinois, USA. As of the 2010 census, its population was 587 and it contained 257 housing units.

== History ==
Pilot Township was one of the eight townships created in 1851.

== Geography ==
According to the 2010 census, the township has a total area of 62.17 square miles (161.0 km^{2}), of which 62.16 square miles (161.0 km^{2}) (or 99.98%) is land and 0.02 square miles (0.052 km^{2}) (or 0.03%) is water.

=== Unincorporated towns ===
- Collison

=== Extinct towns ===
- Hope

=== Adjacent townships ===
- Middlefork Township (north)
- Blount Township (east)
- Oakwood Township (south)
- Ogden Township, Champaign County (southwest)
- Compromise Township, Champaign County (west)

=== Cemeteries ===
The township contains eight cemeteries: Collison, Concord, Emberry Chaple, Knight's Branch, Rice, Stump, Trimmell and Underwood Family.

=== Major highways ===
- Illinois State Route 49

=== Airports and landing strips ===
- Collison Airport

== Demographics ==
Historical population
Census	Pop.	Note	%±
2016 (est.)	568
U.S. Decennial Census
