= 1953 Flint–Beecher tornado =

U.S. natural disaster

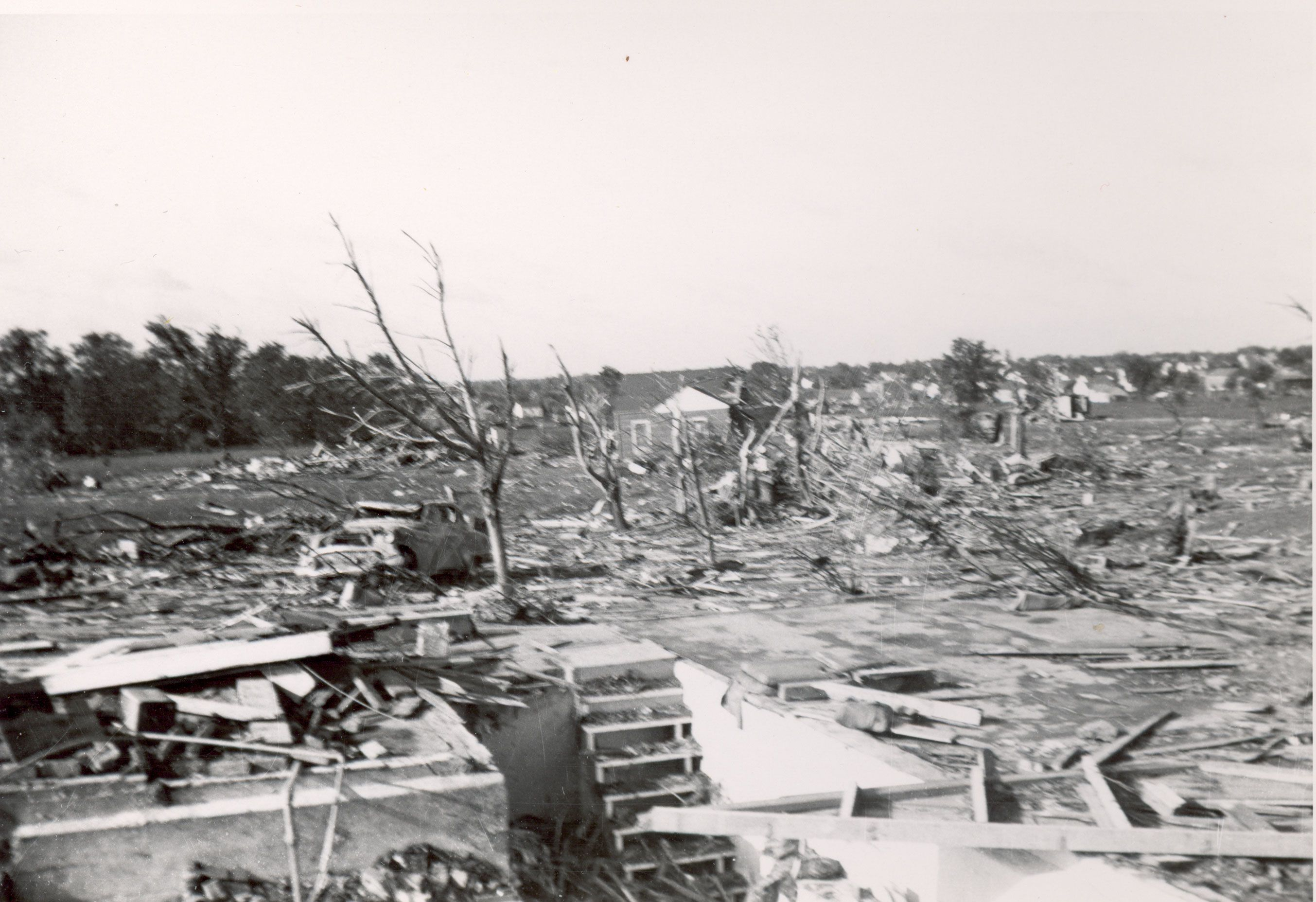
- Tornado damage in Beecher, Michigan

Meteorological history
- Formed: June 8, 1953 , 8:30 pm EST (UTC−05:00)
- Dissipated: June 8, 1953, 9:02 pm EST (UTC−05:00)
- Duration: 32 minutes

F5 tornado
- on the Fujita scale
- Highest winds: >261 mph (420 km/h)

Overall effects
- Fatalities: 116
- Injuries: 844
- Damage: $19 million (1953 USD) $223 million (2024 USD)
- Areas affected: Flint and Beecher, Michigan (part of a larger outbreak)
- Part of the Tornado outbreak of June 7–9, 1953 and tornado outbreaks of 1953

During the evening hours of Monday, June 8, 1953, a large and extremely violent tornado struck the north side of Flint, Michigan and the northern suburb of Beecher, causing catastrophic damage and hundreds of casualties. Rated as an F5 on the Fujita Scale, the tornado touched down in Genesee County, Michigan, at 8:30 p.m. EST (01:30 UTC) and continued on a 18.6-mile-path (29.9 km), causing 116 fatalities, 844 injuries and an estimated $19 million (1953 USD) in damage.

This was the deadliest tornado in Michigan history and the 10th deadliest in United States history. Most of the casualties and damage occurred in the unincorporated community of Beecher. The tornado was one of eight tornadoes that touched down the same day in eastern lower Michigan and northwest Ohio. It was also part of a larger devastating tornado outbreak that began over Nebraska and Iowa, before moving east across the upper Great Lakes states and Ontario, and on to New York and New England causing more deadly tornadoes.

== Meteorological synopsis ==
Just prior to the tornado touching down eyewitness accounts recalled that an approaching thunderstorm with several intense lightning strikes turned the northwest sky a dark "black-yellow-green" color. The US Weather Bureau (predecessor of today's National Weather Service) observations that evening recorded a temperature of 78 °F (26 °C) with a dew point of 71 °F (22 °C) and a barometric pressure reading that fell to 28.89 inches of mercury (978 hPa). Surface map analysis showed a frontal system associated with a strong low pressure moving west across lower Michigan. At 7:30 p.m. (00:30 UTC) the Weather Bureau's Severe Storms Unit issued a Severe Weather Bulletin alerting of the threat of hazardous weather for southeast lower Michigan.

== Tornado Summary ==
At approximately 8:30 p.m. the tornado touched down in Mt. Morris Township near the intersection of Webster and Coldwater Roads, east of Flushing and northwest of Flint. The first reported observation from the Weather Bureau's Flint station came just minutes after the tornado touched down, "...unconfirmed Tornado reported 2 mi N Flushing heading ENE possibly hitting Flint 2033 E." It began to take a path directly east down the Coldwater Road corridor, entering the residential neighborhoods of the Beecher district—a Flint suburb. Moving at approximately 35 miles per hour (56 km/h), the tornado cut a path 833 yards (762 m) wide.

In a time before the routine issuance of severe thunderstorm and tornado warnings the residents of Beecher had almost no advanced warning other than actually sighting the tornado heading towards them. Victims recalled hearing the incredible roar from the tornado and seeing its black funnel before heading for shelter in home basements. The densely populated Beecher neighborhoods took a direct hit, with several single family houses being completely destroyed. Witnesses recalled that the tornado's massive funnel resembled black smoke and was accompanied by smaller multiple vortices. Others reported seeing fireballs within the debris of the tornado. Beecher High School was heavily damaged as it was directly struck. The tornado's path also came close to the North Flint Drive-in theater. Patrons evacuated the drive-in in their vehicles. Some got into vehicle crashes in the ensuing panic to flee while others inadvertently drove into the path of the tornado after leaving the theater. The theater itself received only minor damage.

After leaving Beecher the tornado took an east-northeast path, following just south of the Flint River where it ravaged farms, causing more casualties and destruction near the rural communities of Genesee, Richfield Center and Columbiaville. The tornado stayed on the ground for 18.6 miles (29.9 km) and ultimately dissipated north of Lapeer near Five Lakes Road in Lapeer County's Deerfield Township. Within minutes, a second tornado formed near where the original Flint-Beecher tornado left the ground. That tornado reached F4 wind speeds and continued east through rural farm lands in Lapeer and St. Clair Counties causing more injuries and damage before moving out over Lake Huron.

== Aftermath ==
While most of the tornado's 18.6-mile-path (29.9 km) went through rural farmland, the majority of the devastation was concentrated in the Beecher district. 113 of the 116 fatalities from the tornado occurred in Beecher, including 54 children under the age of 18 with multiple deaths occurring in 20 families. The two greatest losses were exacted to the families of Pedro Gatica and Thomas Gensel; both men survived, but lost their entire families. Gatica, a worker at General Motors, had been at work when the tornado struck, while his small home was directly in the path of the storm. His wife Cecilia, who was eight months pregnant with their third child, was killed, as were their two small children and a niece who lived with them. Gensel had been at home with his wife Vanessa and their four children when their home was blown apart; only Thomas survived. Eight area hospitals, including three in Saginaw, were involved in treating victims.

Some accounts recalled employees of Flint's automobile industry leaving factories to head to the site to discover whether or not their families had survived. Large sections of neighborhoods were completely destroyed. It was the last tornado to kill more than a hundred people until it was surpassed by the Joplin, Missouri, tornado on May 22, 2011. The last F5 tornado in Michigan was the Hudsonville-Standale tornado of April 3, 1956.

It was debated in the U.S. Congress at the time whether recent atomic bomb testing in the upper atmosphere had caused tornadoes, including this one. Congressman James E. Van Zandt (R-Penn.) was among several members of Congress who expressed their belief that the June 4th bomb testing created the tornadoes, which occurred far outside the traditional Tornado Alley. They demanded a response from the government. Meteorologists quickly dispelled such an assertion, and Congressman Van Zandt later retracted his statement.

== See also ==
- Flint–Worcester tornado outbreak sequence
- Worcester tornado
- List of Michigan tornadoes
- List of North American tornadoes and tornado outbreaks
- List of F5 and EF5 Tornadoes
