= Tornado outbreak of June 27, 1953 =

Weather event in the United States

Meteorological history
- Duration: June 27, 1953

Tornado outbreak
- Tornadoes: >5?
- Max. rating: F5 tornado
- Duration: 5 hours and 30 minutes

Overall effects
- Fatalities: 1 fatalities (+1 non-tornadic)
- Injuries: 5 injuries (+7 non-tornadic)
- Damage: $305,000 (1953 USD) $3.67 million (2025 USD)
- Areas affected: North Dakota, Iowa
- Part of the Tornadoes of 1953

A series of destructive tornadoes struck North Dakota and Iowa as part of a much larger severe weather event that took place on June 27, 1953. The most powerful tornado was a violent F5 tornado that obliterated farmlands east of Anita, Iowa. In all, five tornadoes touched down, killing one, injuring five, and causing $305,000 (1953 USD) in damage. Several other casualties also occurred from non-tornadic events that day as well.

== Meteorological synopsis ==
A large area of severe thunderstorms formed over an area stretching from Colorado to Iowa, producing wind, hail, flooding, and lightning. The tornado activity was mostly confined to a small zone in central Iowa, where an outflow boundary branched off a low-pressure system in the western part of state along the southern portion of the state coupled with a tight pressure gradient at 500 mb level. Temperatures in the area were in the upper 70s to upper 90s with dewpoint values in the lower 70s. Iowa had four tornadoes over a four-hour and 15 minute period. An additional tornado also touched down in eastern North Dakota. The severe activity spread eastward over the next two days, bringing additional severe weather impacts all the way to the East Coast of the United States.

== Confirmed tornadoes ==
Confirmed tornadoes by Fujita rating
FU	F0	F1	F2	F3	F4	F5	Total
0	0	2	2	0	0	1	5

List of confirmed tornadoes – Thursday, June 27, 1953 (Note: All dates are based on the local time zone where the tornado touched down; however, all times are in Coordinated Universal Time for consistency.) (Note: Prior to 1994, only the average widths of tornado paths were officially listed.)
F#	Location	County / Parish	State	Start Coord.	Time (UTC)	Path length	Max width
F2	S of Cummings	Traill	ND	47.50°N 97.08°W	20:30–?	0.1 miles (0.16 km)	10 yards (9.1 m)
F2	Four tornado funnels were observed near Cummings with only one of them touching down and causing minor damage. A corn crib was upset and trees were damaged on one farm with another farm seeing no damage at all when the tornado went through the yard. Damages were estimated at $2,500. (Note: All losses are in 1953 USD unless otherwise noted.) Tornado researcher Thomas P. Grazulis did not list this tornado as an F2 or stronger.						
F5	E of Anita to SW of Adair	Cass, Adair	IA	41.45°N 94.70°W	21:45–?	0.1 miles (0.16 km)	100 yards (91 m)
F5	1 death – This violent tornado destroyed four farms east of Anita, one of which was practically obliterated. The tornado hurled heavy machinery for hundreds of feet. Boards were lofted and driven into trees as well. Two people were injured, one critically, and damages were estimated at $250,000.						
F1	NNE of Stanton	Montgomery	IA	41.02°N 95.08°W	22:45–?	0.1 miles (0.16 km)	100 yards (91 m)
F1	Seven farms reported at least some damage, including the destruction of a barn on one of them. Damage was estimated at $25,000. Grazulis classified the tornado as an F2.						
F1	Northwestern Indianola	Warren	IA	41.38°N 93.58°W	23:15–?	0.1 miles (0.16 km)	100 yards (91 m)
F1	A barn and several outbuildings were damaged or destroyed on a few farms. There were two injuries and $25,000 in damage. Grazulis classified the tornado as an F2.						
F2	N of Oskaloosa	Mahaska	IA	41.40°N 92.60°W	02:00–?	7.8 miles (12.6 km)	100 yards (91 m)
F2	A strong tornado damaged or destroyed two structures, including a barn, injuring one person and causing $2,500 in damage. The NCDC incorrectly labels the path as northeast to southwest.						

== Non-tornadic events ==
A severe squall line pushed through the southern part of Iowa, causing a 30 mi (48 km) long swath of widespread wind damage and power outages. Two people were injured in Indianola while another was injured in Ottumwa. Seven hereford cows were also killed by lightning in Mt. Vernon as well. Another severe squall line moved through Milwaukee, Wisconsin, with high winds damaging buildings and vehicles. One person drowned after their sailboat was overturned and three others were injured elsewhere throughout the city. In Missouri, a boy was injured in Linneus and seven Holstein cows were killed in Savannah due to lightning. Several farms and towns in Kansas also suffered damage due to lightning, strong winds, and hail the size of golf balls.

== See also ==
- List of F5 and EF5 tornadoes
- List of North American tornadoes and tornado outbreaks
- August 2020 Midwest derecho
