= Tornado outbreak of May 29, 1953 =

Weather event in the United States

Meteorological history
- Formed: May 29, 1953

Tornado outbreak
- Tornadoes: 9
- Max. rating: F5 tornado
- Duration: 9 hours

Overall effects
- Fatalities: 2
- Injuries: 22
- Damage: $827,500 (1953 USD)
- Areas affected: Great Plains
- Part of the tornado outbreaks of 1953

A destructive outbreak of nine tornadoes struck the Great Plains on May 29, 1953. The strongest one was an F5 tornado that hit Fort Rice, North Dakota, destroying multiple structures and causing the majority of the casualties that day. Other strong tornadoes occurred that day, including an F2 tornado that did major damage when it struck McLaughlin, South Dakota. Overall, the outbreak killed two people, injured 22 others, and caused $827,500 (1953 USD) in damage.

== Meteorological synopsis ==
An unusually strong surface low-pressure system moved into northwestern South Dakota during the afternoon of May 29, 1953. Surface observations indicated that it, along with another nearby low to its southeast, had a pressure lower than 996 mb (29.41 inHg). A dryline extended from this strong low southward ahead of a cold front that curled southwestward while a warm front extended east-northeastward into the Coteau des Prairies of southeastern North Dakota Behind the surface low, an upper-level low moved northeastward through Montana, increasing the pressure gradient over the Northern Plains and inducing high wind shear across the area. Temperatures that afternoon reached anywhere from the upper 80s to mid-90s, and with dew points from 60 to 70 °F, the atmosphere was ripe for an outbreak of severe thunderstorms.

== Confirmed tornadoes ==
Confirmed tornadoes by Fujita rating
FU	F0	F1	F2	F3	F4	F5	Total
0	0	3	5	0	0	1	9

List of confirmed tornadoes – Friday, May 29, 1953 (Note: All dates are based on the local time zone where the tornado touched down; however, all times are in Coordinated Universal Time for consistency.) (Note: Prior to 1994, only the average widths of tornado paths were officially listed.)
F#	Location	County / Parish	State	Start coord.	Time (UTC)	Path length	Max. width	Summary
F1	ENE of Kendrick	Sheridan	WY	44.75°N 106.17°W	20:00–?	0.2 mi (0.32 km)	10 yd (9.1 m)	A tornado occurred in open country with little to no damage reported. (Note: All losses are in 1953 USD unless otherwise noted.)
F2	Bloom	Ford	KS	37.48°N 99.92°W	21:00–?	0.1 mi (0.16 km)	10 yd (9.1 m)	A strong tornado struck the town of Bloom, destroying several small buildings. No damage estimate was given. Tornado researcher Thomas P. Grazulis did not classify the tornado as an F2 or stronger.
F2	McLaughlin	Corson	SD	45.82°N 100.82°W	21:45–?	0.5 mi (0.80 km)	33 yd (30 m)	This brief but strong tornado hit the town of McLaughlin. An auditorium was unroofed, barns and outbuildings were destroyed, and seven homes and two businesses were damaged or destroyed. Two people were injured, and the damage totaled $250,000.
F5	NNW of Cannon Ball to Fort Rice to SW of Brittin	Morton, Emmons,	ND	46.45°N 100.67°W	23:00–23:30	14.8–20 mi (23.8–32.2 km)	600 yd (550 m)	2 deaths – See section on this tornado
F2	S of Wyndmere	Richland	ND	46.20°N 97.13°W	00:00–?	0.1 mi (0.16 km)	10 yd (9.1 m)	This brief but strong tornado struck a farm, wrecking or flattening several large barns, one of which measured up to 70 feet (21 m) in length, causing $2,500 in damage.
F1	Conde	Spink	SD	45.17°N 98.12°W	03:00–?	0.1 mi (0.16 km)	10 yd (9.1 m)	A tornado moved at 70–80 miles per hour (110–130 km/h) through Clark and Codington counties, destroying buildings and machinery and causing $25,000 in damage. The funnel cloud from this tornado was seen from Conde and Wallace. The NCEI only lists this as a brief tornado northwest of Conde.
F2	NNE of Willow Lake to WSW of Vienna	Clark	SD	44.65°N 97.62°W	03:30–?	1.9 mi (3.1 km)	10 yd (9.1 m)	This strong tornado formed near Willow Lake and moved northeastward, destroying buildings on five farmsteads. The damage estimate from the tornado was $25,000, although Grazulis did not classify the tornado as an F2 or stronger.
F1	NW of Chapman	Hall	NE	41.05°N 98.22°W	03:30–?	0.1 mi (0.16 km)	10 yd (9.1 m)	A set of farm buildings was destroyed, although no damage estimate was given.
F2	E of Gardner to NW of Perley, MN	Cass	ND	47.15°N 96.93°W	05:00–?	3.6 mi (5.8 km)	100 yd (91 m)	A strong tornado moved northeast, damaging or destroying buildings on three farms and causing $25,000 in damage before lifting just west of the Red River at the Minnesota border. Grazulis did not classify the tornado as an F2 or stronger.

=== Fort Rice, North Dakota ===
Fort Rice, North Dakota
Meteorological history
- Formed: May 29, 1953

F5 tornado
- on the Fujita scale
- Highest winds: >261 mph (420 km/h)

Overall effects
- Casualties: 22
- Fatalities: 2
- Injuries: 20
- Areas affected: Cannon Ball, Fort Rice, Brittin, Moffit

The tornado, which was over 3/4 of a mile in width, struck Fort Rice, destroying 16 homes and leveling a church. Pews from the church were driven four feet into the ground. Additionally, components of a car were thrown for over half a mile. The tornado also crossed Lake Oahe before dissipating near Britin (not to be confused with Britain) and Moffit. One person was killed in Fort Rice, while another person was killed near the touchdown point north of Cannon Ball. There were 20 injuries and $500,000 in damage. Despite the damage, tornado researcher Thomas P. Grazulis questioned some of the construction of the buildings and initially rated this as an F4 tornado. However, he did subsequently rate the tornado F5. This tornado was one of just three F5/EF5 tornadoes to occur in North Dakota: the other two being the Fargo tornado in 1957 and the Enderlin tornado in 2025.

== See also ==
- List of North American tornadoes and tornado outbreaks
- List of F5, EF5, and IF5 tornadoes
- June 20–23, 1957 tornado outbreak sequence
  - Fargo tornado
