= Fort Rice =

- Psíŋ Otȟúŋwahe
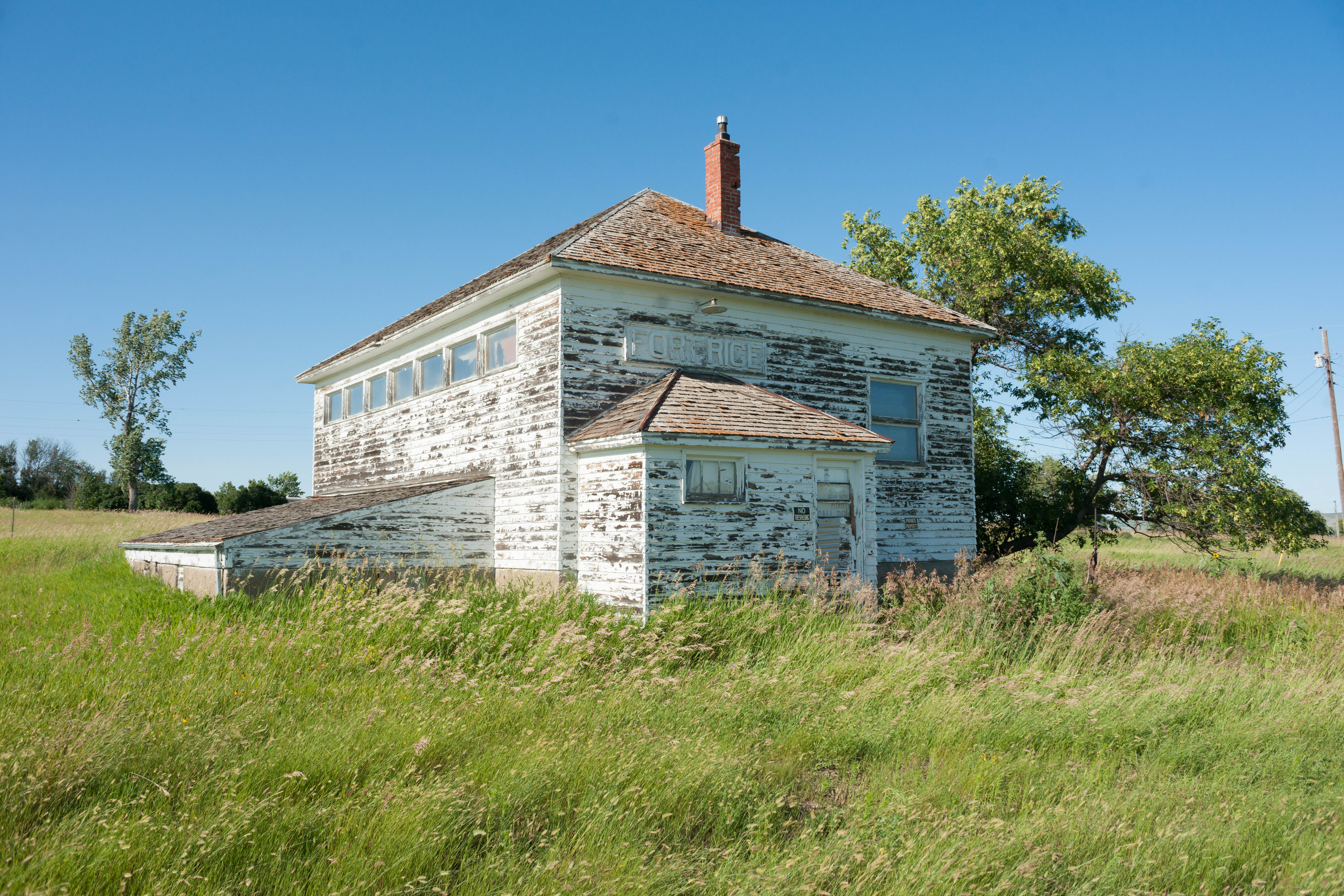

Fort Rice (Lakota: Psíŋ Otȟúŋwahe; "Wild Rice Village") was a frontier military fort in the 19th century named for American Civil War General James Clay Rice in what was then Dakota Territory and what is now North Dakota. The 50th Wisconsin Infantry Regiment became the garrison in October 1865.

== Foundation and History ==
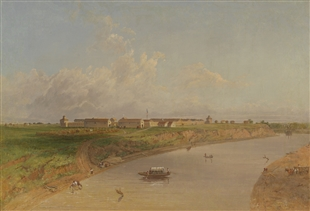
Artist Seth Eastman's rendition of Fort Rice.

The fort was originally established in 1864 by General Alfred H. Sully and was built by him and the 30th Wisconsin Infantry Regiment. This regiment would later be replaced by the 1st US volunteer infantry, consisting mainly of ex-confederate soldiers who had joined the Union. Its location was placed north of the mouth of Cannonball River, and south of Heart River's mouth. The buildings within the fort were made of materials that could be found locally, including cottonwood logs for walls and support, and prairie sod for roofing. The fort was reconstructed in 1868, with the old buildings being torn down and new ones constructed in their stead. The fort became a quadrangle with dimensions of 864 by 544 feet, with 10 foot high wooden barriers surrounding it. By the renovations' completion in 1875, the fort consisted of a guardhouse, a library, a bakery, a magazine, a hospital, four company quarters, five storehouse, and seven officer buildings.

The State Historical Society of North Dakota protects the fort area as Fort Rice State Historic Site, located about 30 miles south of Mandan, North Dakota in Morton County. Visitors can see depressions, foundation lines, and WPA corner markers for the original buildings. The site has a marker indicating the historical significance of the area.

== Usage ==
Despite the protests of its location, Fort Rice sometimes served as a connecting point between the people of the United States and Sioux Nation. Meetings were held and treaties were signed on its premises. Though tensions remained high for the entire duration of the fort's usage, it served as an invaluable outpost in the frontier for the US government. Expeditions were led from the fort for exploratory purposes, and having a military presence nearby meant that travelers, railway surveyors, and workmen were safe from ambushes from indigenous peoples and wildlife.

== Notable Events and People ==
=== The First Winter ===
During the first winter at the fort, the garrisoning company suffered great losses. 81 men died, mostly due to scurvy as a result of malnutrition. Seven of these 81 deaths were a result of attacks from the Lakota tribesmen, who believed that the land that the fort situated itself on was rightfully belonged to their people. This belief held true, as the construction of a fort on the land that Fort Rice sits on was a direct violation of the Treaty of Fort Laramie (1851), and leaders of local Lakota tribes demanded the removal of the fort. Prominent Sioux leaders such as Sitting Bull even led attacks against the fort's supplies and livestock in hopes of making the garrisoned army abandon the fort.

=== Treaty of Fort Laramie of 1868 ===
The Treaty of Fort Laramie (1868) served as a victory in the Oglala, Miniconjou, and Brulé tribes of the Lakota people reclaiming a decently large portion of their land. It followed the failed Treaty of Fort Laramie (1851), but was much more successful in both parties holding true to their claims. Upwards of 50,000 Sioux gather at Fort Rice for the signing of the treaty, with notable leaders including Running Antelope and Two Bears attending. Sitting Bull did not attend, but sent a replacement to sign the treaty in his stead.

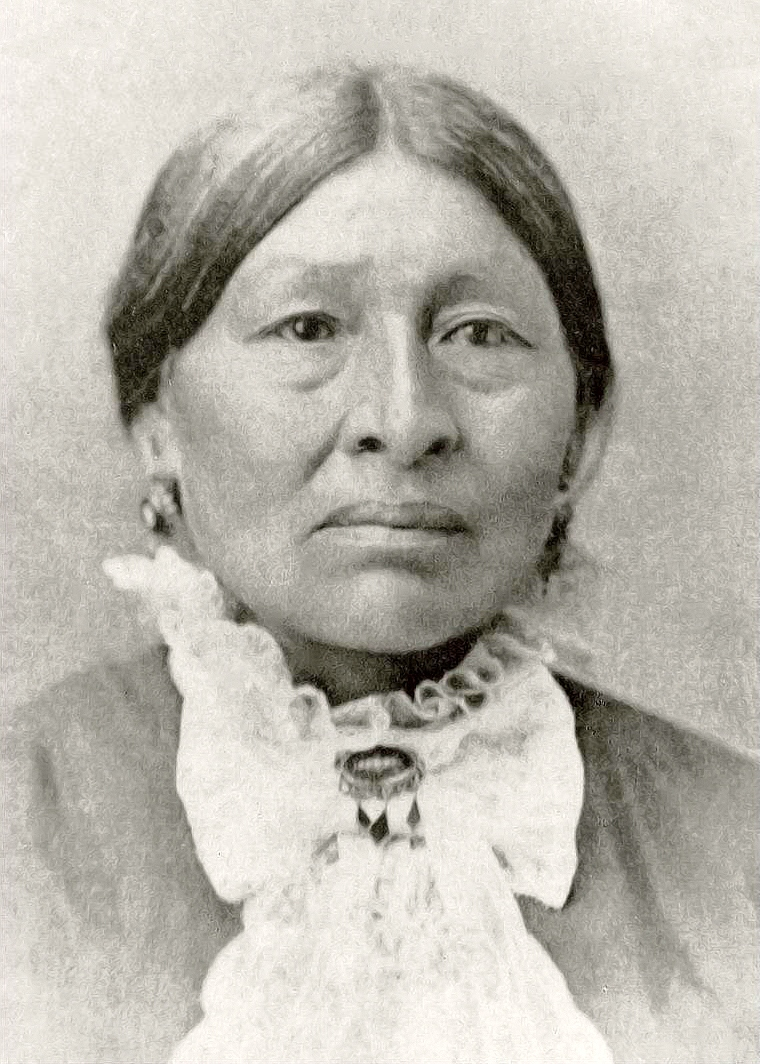
Matilda Picotte Galpin.

=== Sitting Bull ===
The Sioux leader Sitting Bull was strongly in favor of the independence of his own people, and was notorious for refusing peace offerings from the US government. At one point, Sitting Bull roused an army of upwards of 400 warriors to attack Fort Rice. After a three-hour battle, about a dozen Lakota warriors were killed, with two US soldiers killed and three wounded. This failed attempt to ravage the fort's defenses cost Sitting Bull a decent amount of reputation and honor among his people.

=== Matilda Galpin (Eagle Woman That All Look At) ===
Matilda Galpin was a peace activist who gained quite an impressive reputation among the soldiers at Fort Rice. Wife to Charles Galpin, a US officer, Matilda Galpin was accustomed to life in the fort. However, upon witnessing an ambush of a First Lieutenant Benjamin Wilson by a Lakota warband, she sprinted into the fray and claimed the wounded man as one of her own. In doing so, she prevented the soldier from being scalped and was able to get him back into the fort to seek medical attention. Unfortunately, Wilson's lung had been pierced by an arrow, and he succumbed to the complications of the wound in the following days. That did not, however, prevent Galpin from attaining a heroine's reputation. Captain Enoch Adams went as far to refer to her as, "One of the finest women in the world..." She was a large source of the push towards peace between the US and Sioux, and has been praised for her efforts in drawing the two nations closer to an understanding of one another.

=== Rain-in-the-Face ===
A Lakota warrior known as Rain-in-the-Face killed two civilians accompanying an exploratory mission of Yellowstone departing from Fort Rice in 1873. These murders brought about the anger of Tom and George Custer—the latter being the well known General Custer, famous for his battles against indigenous peoples in the American frontier.

=== 1953 Tornado ===
On May 29, 1953, a violent F5 tornado struck the area, killing two people and injuring 20 others. While the F-scale hadn't yet been developed in 1953, the Fort Rice tornado later became North Dakota's first confirmed F5 tornado.
