= Collison, Illinois =

Collison
- Unincorporated community
- Location of Collison within Illinois Collison (the United States)
- Coordinates: 40°13′30″N 87°48′14″W
- Country: United States
- State: Illinois
- County: Vermilion
- Township: Pilot
- Elevation: 689 ft (210 m)
- Time zone: UTC-6 (CST)
  - Summer (DST): UTC-5 (CDT)
- Postal code: 61831
- Area code: 217
- GNIS ID: 406387

Collison is an unincorporated community in Pilot Township, Vermilion County, Illinois.

== Geography ==
Collison is located at 40°13′30″N 87°48′14″W.

== In popular culture ==
In the short story "Westward the Course of Empire Takes Its Way" by David Foster Wallace, which appears in his short story collection Girl With Curious Hair, the town of Collision is the site of a fictional McDonald's commercial shot in 1970 and the location of a present-day reunion by ex-McDonald's commercial actors on which the story hinges. Wallace creates a fantastical origin story for the town involving a wealthy Chicago woman driving in a southward direction who accidentally hits, and kills, a farmer in a tractor and decides, in a fit of guilt, to make a home out of her crashed car, thus kickstarting the town of Collision into existence. In an extra bit of satirical irony, the manslaughtered farmer is Ray Kroc Sr.- father of McDonald's "founder" Ray Kroc.
