= Beecher, Michigan =

Beecher, Michigan Beecher Metropolitan District
- Census-designated place (CDP) & unincorporated community
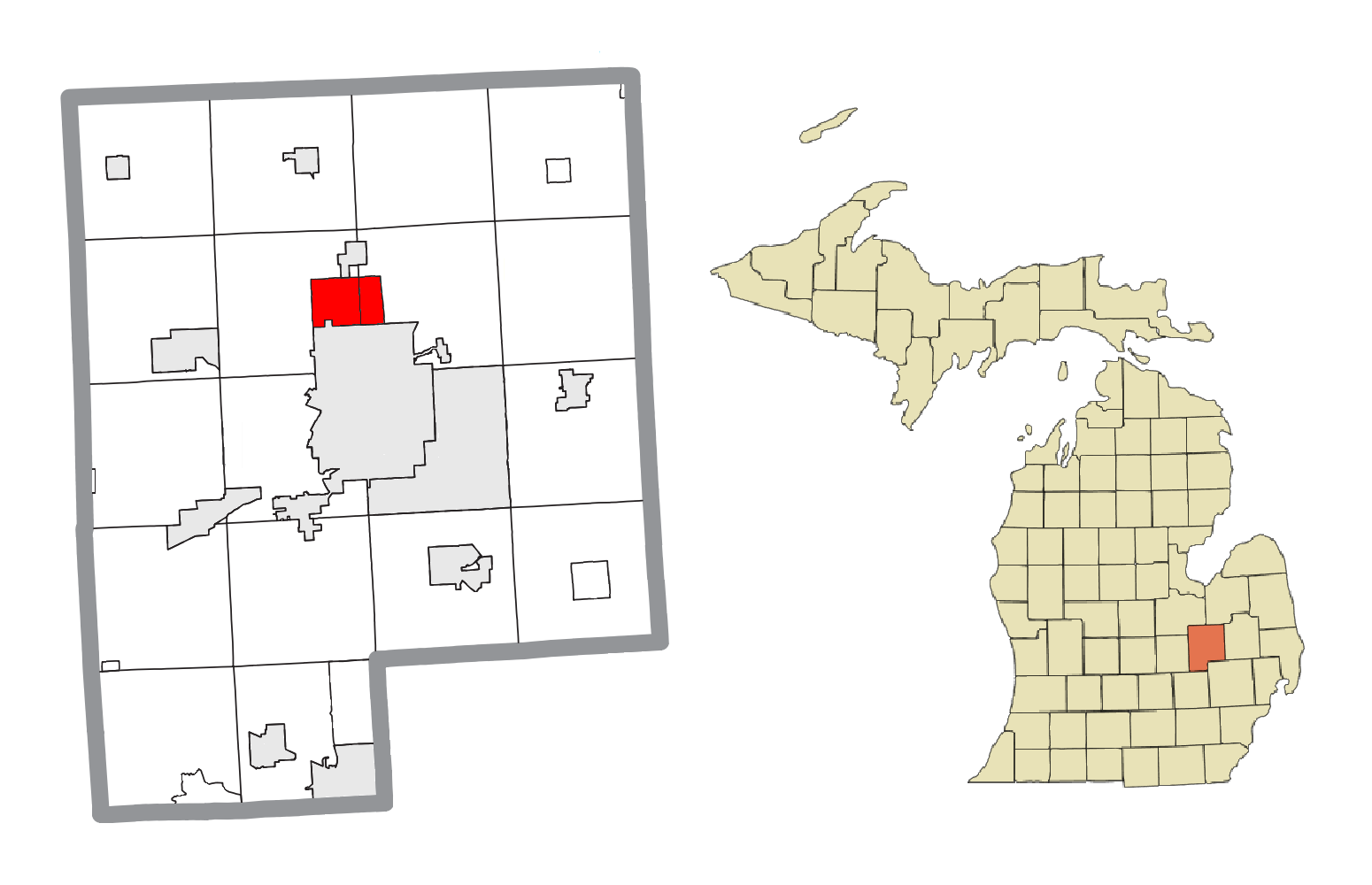
- Location within Genesee County

- Location within the state of Michigan Beecher (the United States)
- Coordinates: 43°05′24″N 83°41′40″W
- Country: United States
- State: Michigan
- County: Genesee
- Townships: Genesee and Mount Morris

Area
  - Total: 5.90 sq mi (15.28 km^{2})
  - Land: 5.88 sq mi (15.23 km^{2})
  - Water: 0.019 sq mi (0.05 km^{2})
- Elevation: 781 ft (238 m)

Population (2020)
  - Total: 8,840
  - Density: 1,502.8/sq mi (580.25/km^{2})
- Time zone: UTC-5 (EST)
  - Summer (DST): UTC-4 (EDT)
- ZIP code(s): 48458 (Mount Morris); 48504 (Flint); 48505 (Flint)
- Area code: 810
- FIPS code: 26-06820
- GNIS feature ID: 2393332
- Website: beecherwater.us

Beecher (or also, Beecher Metropolitan District) is a census-designated place (CDP) in Genesee County in the U.S. state of Michigan. It was first listed as a CDP in 2000. Per the 2020 census, the population was 8,840.

The CDP area is situated on the east side of Mount Morris Township where Interstate 475 turns westward between the cities of Flint and Mount Morris. The eastern one-third of the CDP is in the western part of Genesee Township.

The name "Beecher" is used for a number of institutions covering some part of the census-designated place: Beecher Community School District, Beecher Fire Department and Beecher Metropolitan Water and Sewer District.

== Geography ==
According to the United States Census Bureau, the CDP has a total area of 5.9 square miles (15.3 km^{2}), of which 0.02 square miles (0.05 km^{2}), or 0.32%, is water. The southern part of the CDP is served by the Flint ZIP codes of 48504 and 48505. The northern portion is served by the Mount Morris ZIP code 48458.

Beecher Road runs through Genesee County, but it lies mostly in Flint Township and Clayton Township and not Beecher itself.

== Demographics ==
Historical population
Census	Pop.	Note	%±
2000	12,793		—
2010	10,232		−20.0%
2020	8,840		−13.6%
U.S. Decennial Census; 2010 2020

=== Racial and ethnic composition ===
Beecher CDP, Michigan – Racial and ethnic composition Note: the US Census treats Hispanic/Latino as an ethnic category. This table excludes Latinos from the racial categories and assigns them to a separate category. Hispanics/Latinos may be of any race.
Race / Ethnicity (NH = Non-Hispanic)	Pop 2000	Pop 2010	Pop 2020	% 2000	% 2010	% 2020
White alone (NH)	3,422	2,428	2,028	26.75%	23.73%	22.94%
Black or African American alone (NH)	8,394	7,011	5,909	65.61%	68.52%	66.84%
Native American or Alaska Native alone (NH)	56	74	48	0.44%	0.72%	0.54%
Asian alone (NH)	10	12	13	0.08%	0.12%	0.15%
Native Hawaiian or Pacific Islander alone (NH)	4	1	2	0.03%	0.01%	0.02%
Other race alone (NH)	45	28	40	0.35%	0.27%	0.45%
Mixed race or Multiracial (NH)	356	316	437	2.78%	3.09%	4.94%
Hispanic or Latino (any race)	506	362	363	3.96%	3.54%	4.11%
Total	12,793	10,232	8,840	100.00%	100.00%	100.00%

=== 2020 census ===
As of the 2020 census, Beecher had a population of 8,840. The median age was 35.4 years. 27.4% of residents were under the age of 18 and 14.7% of residents were 65 years of age or older. For every 100 females there were 89.5 males, and for every 100 females age 18 and over there were 86.6 males age 18 and over.

99.5% of residents lived in urban areas, while 0.5% lived in rural areas.

There were 3,385 households in Beecher, of which 33.6% had children under the age of 18 living in them. Of all households, 22.2% were married-couple households, 22.8% were households with a male householder and no spouse or partner present, and 46.5% were households with a female householder and no spouse or partner present. About 29.5% of all households were made up of individuals, and 10.9% had someone living alone who was 65 years of age or older.

There were 4,091 housing units, of which 17.3% were vacant. The homeowner vacancy rate was 3.2% and the rental vacancy rate was 12.8%.

=== 2000 census ===
As of the census of 2000, there were 12,793 people, 4,476 households, and 3,280 families residing in the CDP. The population density was 2,159.8 inhabitants per square mile (833.9/km^{2}). There were 5,002 housing units at an average density of 844.5 per square mile (326.1/km^{2}). The racial makeup of the CDP was 65.90% White, 28.01% Black or African American, 0.59% Native American, 0.08% Asian, 0.04% Pacific Islander, 1.92% from other races, and 3.41% from two or more races. Hispanic or Latino of any race were 3.96% of the population.

There were 4,476 households, out of which 39.1% had children under the age of 18 living with them, 32.6% were married couples living together, 33.7% had a female householder with no husband present, and 26.7% were non-families. 22.1% of all households were made up of individuals, and 7.1% had someone living alone who was 65 years of age or older. The average household size was 2.85 and the average family size was 3.27.

In the CDP, the population was spread out, with 34.3% under the age of 18, 9.8% from 18 to 24, 26.9% from 25 to 44, 19.6% from 45 to 64, and 9.3% who were 65 years of age or older. The median age was 29 years. For every 100 females there were 88.5 males. For every 100 females age 18 and over, there were 81.0 males.

The median income for a household in the CDP was $25,925, and the median income for a family was $26,500. Males had a median income of $29,150 versus $21,870 for females. The per capita income for the CDP was $13,484. About 25.0% of families and 30.3% of the population were below the poverty line, including 45.0% of those under age 18 and 9.3% of those age 65 or over. Due to the schools' mascot, the Buccaneers, the area is also known as Buc-town.

== Beecher tornado ==
At about 8:30 pm, on Monday evening, June 8, 1953, a tornado touched down near the intersection of W. Coldwater and North Linden roads, just north of Flint. Before the storm left Genesee County, 116 people died in the Beecher district. A track of destruction 0.5 miles (800 m) wide was left.

The slow-moving tornado wrecked 340 houses, severely damaged many others, and injured 844 persons. The major damage was concentrated between Clio Road and N. Dort Highway. This area contained mostly small homes with some businesses and a high school. It is ranked the 10th deadliest tornado in U. S. history, being displaced from 9th position in spring 2011 by the Joplin, Missouri tornado.

== Government ==
=== Beecher Fire Department ===
Mount Morris Township Fire Station 3 (Formerly Beecher Fire Department)
Agency overview
- Established: 1948
- Employees: 20
- Commissioner: Rick Johnson (administrative Township Fire Chief)
- Fire chief: Steve Richardson

Facilities and equipment
- Stations: 1

The former Beecher Fire Department (now known as Mt. Morris Township Fire Station 3) is one of three stations in Mount Morris Township, Michigan. The station serves the Beecher area (5 square miles (13 km^{2}) and population of 21,000) within the Township.

The department was founded in 1948 and operated independently of the other two stations until recently.

=== Beecher Metropolitan Water and Sewer District ===
Beecher Metropolitan Water and Sewer District

Agency overview
- Formed: 1938
- Type: special district
- Headquarters: 1057 Louis Ave Flint, Michigan 48505-1228
- Employees: 17
- Ministers responsible: Leo McClain, Board President; John Miller, Corrine McFadden, Jackie Corlew and Sheila Thorn, Board members
- Agency executive: vacant, administrator
- Website: beecherwater.us

The Beecher Metropolitan Water and Sewer District is a special district for water and sewer serving generally the same area as the Beecher Community School District with 4,500 homes. A district board of five elected members oversees operation. The district's source of water is underground wells.

The District was formed in 1938. Heavy rains in April 2009 led to the district reporting 5,000 gallons spilling into the Hughes Drain, which drains into the Flint River.

In August 2009, all members of the board were discovered to have taken a 19-day, $36,000 trip to San Diego, California, for a four-day American Water Works Association conference. After the nonrenewal of administrator Richard Wurtz's contract, language was submitted to recall three of the five board members: Leo McClain, Sheila Thorn and Jackie Corlew. The Genesee County Election Commission approved the language that included the reasons of misusing District funds and "for causing embarrassment to Beecher area residents".

== Notable people ==
- Carl Banks, linebacker for the New York Giants, Washington Redskins, and Cleveland Browns; graduate of Beecher High School
- Courtney Hawkins, wide receiver for the Tampa Bay Buccaneers and Pittsburgh Steelers; graduated high school in Beecher
- Carol Yager, among the most severely obese people in history
- Jaylein Auther-Henry Cantrell, rapper known by his stage name, YN Jay
