= National Register of Historic Places listings in Franklin County, Nebraska =

Location of Franklin County in Nebraska

Franklin County, Nebraska, United States, has four properties and districts listed on the National Register of Historic Places, and three former listings.

This National Park Service list is complete through NPS recent listings posted October 30, 2026.

== Current listings ==
	Name on the Register	Image	Date listed	Location	City or town	Description
1	First Congregational Church, U.C.C.	First Congregational Church, U.C.C.	September 14, 1982 (#82003188)	Off Nebraska Highway 31C; 40°04′42″N 99°08′31″W	Naponee	
2	Franklin County Courthouse	Franklin County Courthouse	July 5, 1990 (#90000962)	15th Ave. between N and O Sts. 40°05′51″N 98°57′14″W	Franklin	
3	Lost Creek Archeological Site		May 26, 1983 (#83001094)	Address Restricted	Bloomington	
4	Republican River Bridge	Republican River Bridge	June 29, 1992 (#92000765)	County road over the Republican River, 1 mile east and 1.5 miles south of Riverton; 40°04′10″N 98°44′38″W	Riverton	

== Former listings ==
	Name on the Register	Image	Date listed	Date removed	Location	City or town	Description
1	Dupee Music Hall	Dupee Music Hall	September 26, 1985 (#85002484)	March 17, 2017	1402 P St. 40°06′00″N 98°57′14″W	Franklin	
2	Franklin Bridge	Franklin Bridge	June 29, 1992 (#92000764)	March 13, 2020	Nebraska Highway 10 over the Republican River, 1 mile south of Franklin; 40°04′33″N 98°57′08″W	Franklin	
3	Lincoln Hotel	Lincoln Hotel	July 6, 1989 (#89000799)	March 22, 2016	519 15th Ave. 40°05′47″N 98°57′13″W	Franklin	

== See also ==
- List of National Historic Landmarks in Nebraska
- National Register of Historic Places listings in Nebraska
