= Tornado outbreak of June 7–9, 1953 =

1953 tornado outbreak in the United States

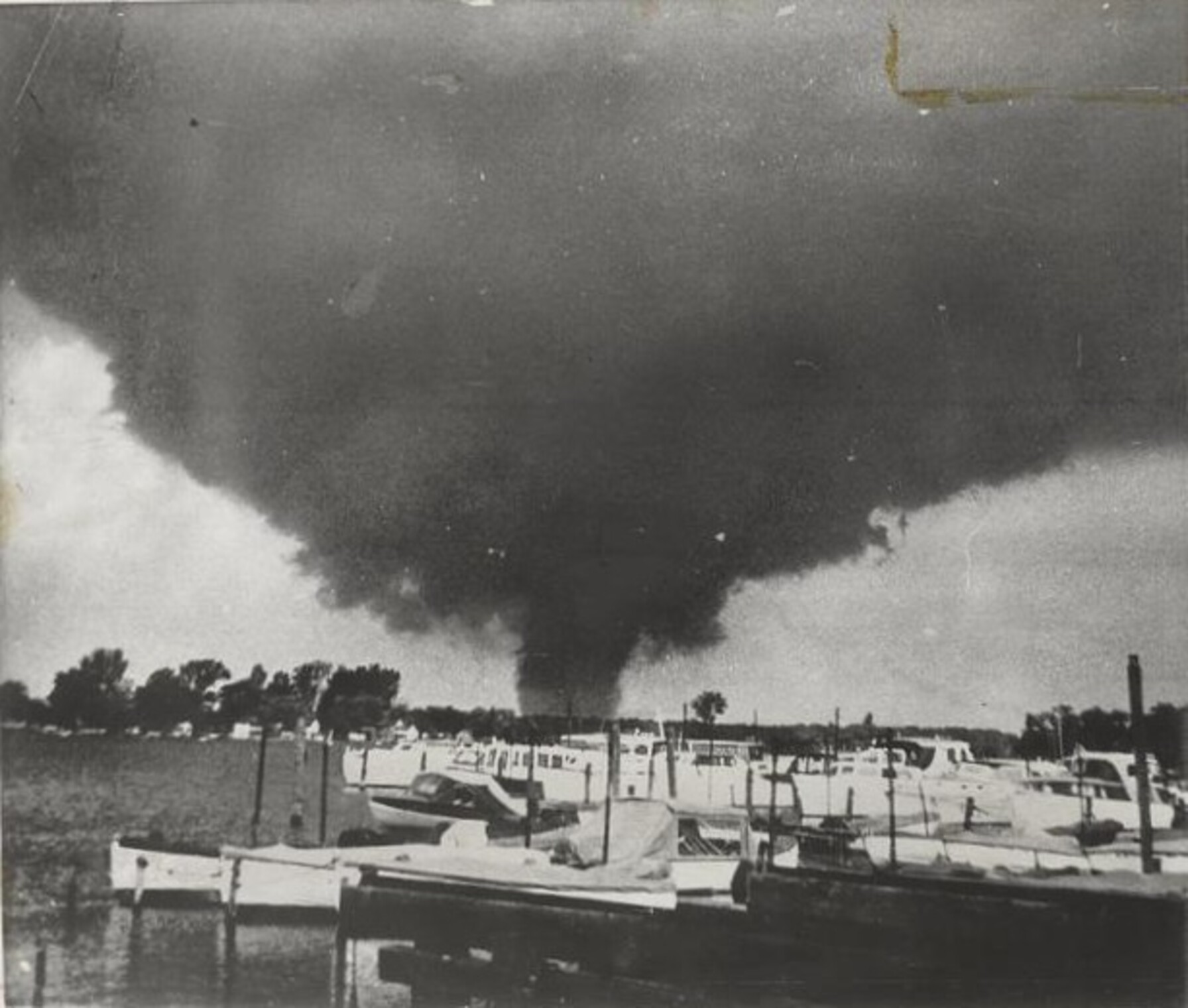
- An F4 tornado near Erie, Michigan.

Meteorological history
- Duration: June 7–9, 1953

Tornado outbreak
- Tornadoes: 50 confirmed
- Max. rating: F5 tornado
- Duration: 3 days

Overall effects
- Fatalities: 251
- Injuries: 2,619
- Damage: $340.6 million (1953 USD) $4.1 billion (2025 USD)
- Areas affected: Midwestern and Northeastern United States
- Part of the tornado outbreaks of 1953

An extremely devastating and deadly tornado outbreak impacted the Midwestern and Northeastern United States at the beginning of June 1953. It included two tornadoes that caused at least 90 deaths each—an F5 tornado occurring in Flint, Michigan on June 8 and an F4 tornado in Worcester, Massachusetts on June 9. (Note: An outbreak is generally defined as a group of at least six tornadoes (the number sometimes varies slightly according to local climatology) with no more than a six-hour gap between individual tornadoes. An outbreak sequence, prior to (after) modern records that began in 1950, is defined as, at most, two (one) consecutive days without at least one significant (F2 or stronger) tornado.) (Note: All damage totals are in 1953 United States dollars unless otherwise noted.) These tornadoes are among the deadliest in United States history and were caused by the same storm system that moved eastward across the nation.

The Flint and Worcester tornadoes were the most infamous storms produced by a larger outbreak of severe weather that began in Nebraska, Iowa and Wisconsin, before moving across the Great Lakes states, and then into New York and New England. Other F3 and F4 tornadoes struck other locations in Massachusetts, Michigan, New Hampshire and Ohio.

== Meteorological synopsis ==
On June 6, a surface low-pressure area formed over Northwestern New Mexico and eventually began to move northeastward into the Great Plains. On June 7, the low-pressure system moved into Southwestern Nebraska with a cold front extending a short distance westward into Northeastern Colorado, a dryline that extended south into Southwestern Texas, and a warm front that extended east-northeastward to near Omaha, Nebraska before turning east-southeastward into Southwestern Indiana. Temperatures across Kansas, Nebraska, and Iowa that afternoon in the area were up in the upper 70s to lower 90s Fahrenheit (26-32 C) while dewpoints were in the lower 60s to lower 70s (16-22 C). With shear values of 55 kn (102 km/h; 63 mph) in the upper atmosphere, the environment became extremely ripe for the development of severe weather and tornadoes throughout the afternoon and evening. A jet streak formed later that night after an upper-level low formed, which allowed the outbreak to go well into the overnight hours.

By June 8, the surface low and upper-level low had moved into Canada. The surface low occluded with the warm front over the Eastern Great Lakes into Ontario and New York and the cold front extending southwestward into Southeastern Iowa. A surface boundary formed, spanning from Eastern Upper Michigan southwestward into Southwestern Illinois. Upper-level wind shear values were even stronger on this day, reaching as high as 65 kn (120 km/h; 75 mph). Temperatures were in the upper 70s to upper 80s Fahrenheit (26-32 C) with dewpoints in the mid 60s to mid 70s (20-25 C). This allowed for a line of large and violent tornadic supercells to form across Eastern Lower Michigan into Northwestern Ohio. These storms marched eastward throughout the afternoon before weakening that evening. A sounding taken on June 8 revealed 4500+ J/kg CAPE.

On June 9, the cold front from the surface low over Eastern Ontario had moved into New England. A shortwave trough had formed over the region in the upper atmosphere, conjuring up extremely strong wind shear values of 100 kn (190 km/h; 120 mph). At the surface, temperatures were in the upper 70s to mid 80s Fahrenheit (26-30 C) with dewpoints in the mid 60s to lower 70s (18-20 C). Numerous supercell thunderstorms formed along the cold front, spawning wind, hail, and tornadoes before weakening and moving offshore that evening.

== Confirmed tornadoes ==
Confirmed tornadoes by Fujita rating
FU	F0	F1	F2	F3	F4	F5	Total
0	14	10	13	7	5	1	50

=== June 7 event ===
List of confirmed tornadoes – Sunday, June 7, 1953 (Note: All dates are based on the local time zone where the tornado touched down; however, all times are in Coordinated Universal Time and dates are split at midnight CST/CDT for consistency.) (Note: Prior to 1994, only the average widths of tornado paths were officially listed.)
F#	Location	County / Parish	State	Start coord.	Time (UTC)	Path length	Max. width	Summary
F1	E of Morland	Graham	KS	39.35°N 100.5°W	19:00–?	0.1 miles (160 m)	33 yards (30 m)	This tornado, which was accompanied by large hail and strong winds, was the first of three tornadoes produced by the same squall line, which damaged six farmsteads. There was $25,000 in damage.
F2	S of Hill City	Graham	KS	39.35°N 99.85°W	19:00–?	0.1 miles (160 m)	33 yards (30 m)	This tornado, which was accompanied by large hail and strong winds, was the second of three tornadoes produced by the same squall line, which damaged six farmsteads. There was $25,000 in damage.
F0	S of Edmond to SSW of Logan	Graham, Norton	KS	39.53°N 99.83°W	19:00–?	10.9 miles (17.5 km)	33 yards (30 m)	This tornado, which was accompanied by large hail and strong winds, was the third of three tornadoes produced by the same squall line, which damaged six farmsteads. There was $25,000 in damage.
F1	WSW of Julesburg (1st tornado)	Sedgwick	CO	40.98°N 102.28°W	20:00–?	0.1 miles (160 m)	33 yards (30 m)	This was the first of five tornadoes in the area and the only one that caused known damage, which was limited to small farm buildings and equipment. There was $2,500 in damage.
F1	N of Julesburg	Sedgwick	CO	41°N 102.27°W	20:00–?	0.1 miles (160 m)	33 yards (30 m)	This was the second of five tornadoes in the area. There was no damage value given.
F2	ENE of Mason City to SW of Arcadia	Custer, Sherman	NE	41.23°N 99.27°W	20:30–?	6.6 miles (10.6 km)	100 yards (91 m)	Farm houses were destroyed and livestock were killed. Barns were leveled as well. Losses totaled $500,000.
F2	WNW of Giltner to SSW of Phillips	Hamilton	NE	40.78°N 98.17°W	21:00–?	6.6 miles (10.6 km)	33 yards (30 m)	A strong tornado damaged sets of farm buildings on three farms while ripping roofs off of homes. There was $25,000 in damage.
F0	S of Phillips	Hamilton	NE	40.83°N 98.22°W	21:00–?	4.1 miles (6.6 km)	33 yards (30 m)	There was $2,500 in damage.
F1	ENE of Rising City to Octavia to WNW of Linwood	Butler	NE	41.2°N 97.28°W	21:00–?	22.7 miles (36.5 km)	33 yards (30 m)	Barns were destroyed on a dozen farms with losses totaling $25,000 in damage. Two people were injured. The CDNS report states that the tornado injured four and was short-lived, implying that this was actually a tornado family.
F4	S of Arcadia to WSW of Ord	Sherman, Valley	NE	41.33°N 99.13°W	21:15–?	15 miles (24 km)	440 yards (400 m)	11 deaths – See article on this tornado
F0	WSW of Julesburg (2nd tornado)	Sedgwick	CO	40.98°N 102.21°W	22:00–?	0.1 miles (160 m)	33 yards (30 m)	This was the third of five tornadoes in the area. There was no damage.
F2	E of Scotia to Greeley to Spalding	Greeley	NE	41.47°N 98.63°W	22:00–?	20.1 miles (32.3 km)	33 yards (30 m)	This was more than likely a family of tornadoes linked by strong winds. There was one injury and $25,000 in damage. The CDNS report does not list any casualties.
F0	SW of Julesburg	Sedgwick	CO	40.97°N 102.3°W	22:00–?	0.1 miles (160 m)	33 yards (30 m)	This was the fourth of five tornadoes in the area. There was no damage.
F0	NW of Julesburg	Sedgwick	CO	41°N 102.3°W	22:00–?	0.1 miles (160 m)	33 yards (30 m)	This was the fifth of five tornadoes in the area. There was no damage.
F2	WNW of Octavia to WNW of Linwood	Butler	NE	41.35°N 97.07°W	22:00–?	6.9 miles (11.1 km)	33 yards (30 m)	This strong tornado, which accompanied by spotted hail in the vicinity, barely missed Octavia and Linwood while moving over farmland. Losses totaled $250,000 and two people were injured. The CDNS report does not list any casualties.
F3	NW of Albion to SE of Petersburg	Boone	NE	41.7°N 98.02°W	22:15–?	8 miles (13 km)	250 yards (230 m)	This intense tornado touched down northwest of Albion and Boone and moved northward. A house was destroyed along with multiple barns. Paint was stripped from a tractor and livestock were killed. Losses totaled $250,000 and one person was injured, although the CDNS report does not list any casualties.
F0	Macon to SE of Upland	Franklin	NE	40.3°N 98.85°W	22:30–?	9 miles (14 km)	33 yards (30 m)	A weak tornado stayed mostly over open terrain, causing $25,000 in damage.
F1	E of Franklin to Upland	Franklin	NE	40.1°N 98.85°W	23:00–?	15 miles (24 km)	33 yards (30 m)	This tornado, which was embedded within a much larger swath of hail, moved north-northwestward over farmland, causing $2,500 in damage.
F2	SW of Battle Creek to S of Pierce	Madison, Pierce	NE	41.95°N 97.67°W	23:00–?	16.6 miles (26.7 km)	33 yards (30 m)	Two sets of farm buildings were badly damaged and there was minor damage to crops. No damage value was given.
F2	SW of Pierce to Sholes to SW of Laurel	Pierce, Wayne, Cedar	NE	41.95°N 97.67°W	23:00–?	31 miles (50 km)	33 yards (30 m)	Barns and outbuildings were destroyed on a dozen farms. Six people were injured and losses totaled $50,000. Two other tornadoes were seen with this tornado, which may include the one above.
F1	W of Foster to SSW of Osmond	Pierce	NE	42.28°N 97.78°W	23:10–?	8.2 miles (13.2 km)	33 yards (30 m)	A set of farm buildings were struck, but only minor damage occurred. Losses totaled $250.
F0	NW of Allen	Dixon	NE	42.45°N 96.87°W	23:40–?	1.5 miles (2.4 km)	33 yards (30 m)	This weak tornado, which was accompanied by small hail, caused mostly minor damage, although one person was injured. Damage totaled $2,500. The exact track of the tornado is unknown.
F0	N of Mitchell	Davison	SD	43.85°N 98.02°W	23:45–?	1.5 miles (2.4 km)	33 yards (30 m)	A brief tornado occurred south of Davison-Sanborn County line. No damage occurred.
F2	Westfield	Plymouth	IA	42.75°N 96.60°W	00:15–?	11.3 miles (18.2 km)	200 yards (180 m)	Barns were destroyed, although no damage value was given. This was the first of a family of five tornadoes to touch down over the course of 3.25 hours. Wind squalls also accompanied this storm and the tornadoes.
F2	NW of Blair	Washington	NE	41.55°N 96.25°W	00:45–?	4.1 miles (6.6 km)	33 yards (30 m)	A strong tornado caused damage to buildings and crops over open terrain. Losses totaled $25,000. The CDNS report listed the tornado as being closer to Foster than Blair.
F1	SE of Trimont to South Branch to SE of Grogan	Martin, Watonwan	MN	43.75°N 94.68°W	01:00–?	19.1 miles (30.7 km)	33 yards (30 m)	Several barns and other outbuildings, silos, windmills, and a steel grain bin were destroyed by this weak, but destructive tornado, which was first observed as a funnel cloud aloft near Trimont and accompanied by heavy rain. Power poles and wires were down, trees were uprooted and livestock and poultry were killed. Losses totaled $25,000.
F0	S of Hooper	Dodge	NE	41.60°N 96.55°W	01:00–?	1 mile (1.6 km)	33 yards (30 m)	A set of farm buildings and barns were destroyed with only the house left intact. No damage value was given, but five people were injured. The CDNS report lists only four injuries.
F0	SE of Milford Colony	Lewis and Clark	MT	47.28°N 112.17°W	01:00–?	0.1 miles (160 m)	33 yards (30 m)	A brief tornado touch down from one of two funnel clouds southeast of Augusta. There was no damage.
F2	N of Ida Grove to Plover to E of Fenton	Ida, Sac, Pocahontas, Palo Alto, Kossuth	IA	42.37°N 95.48°W	01:30–02:20	49.2 miles (79.2 km)	833 yards (762 m)	This was the second of a family of five tornadoes to touch down over the course of 3.25 hours and caused some of the worst damage. This large tornado first touched down near Ida Grove and moved northeastward before lifting temporarily northwest of Early. It then touched down again over Havelock and again moved northeastward, slicing through Plover before shrinking to 500 yards (460 m) wide, striking Whittemore, and dissipating halfway between Fenton and Lone Rock. Damage mainly consisted of barns and crops being destroyed, although no damage value was given.
F2	N of Gowrie to Duncombe to SW of Olaf	Webster, Hamilton, Wright	IA	42.30°N 94.30°W	03:00–?	49 miles (79 km)	200 yards (180 m)	This was the third of a family of five tornadoes to touch down over the course of 3.25 hours. The worst damage occurred in Duncombe, near Holmes, and west of Belmond. Damage also occurred in Lundgren and Eagle Grove. A church was lifted up and set down again and barns were destroyed, although no damage value was given. This tornado may have occurred after the one listed below according to the CDNS report.
F3	W of Pomeroy to Southeastern Palmer to SSW of Livermore	Calhoun, Pocahontas, Humboldt	IA	42.55°N 94.70°W	03:15–03:30	30.7 miles (49.4 km)	200 yards (180 m)	This was the fourth of a family of five tornadoes to touch down over the course of 3.25 hours and caused some of the worst damage. The tornado first was reported near Pomeroy and moved northeastward, causing severe damage on the southeast side of Palmer. Damage also occurred near Gilmore City before the tornado dissipated near Livermore. No damage value was given. This tornado may have occurred before the one listed above according to the CDNS report.
F1	E of Boxholm to Stanhope to Jewell	Boone, Hamilton	IA	42.17°N 94.07°W	03:30–?	2.3 miles (3.7 km)	100 yards (91 m)	This was the last of a family of five tornadoes to touch down over the course of 3.25 hours. Although the official record says that the tornado only travelled between Boxholm and Pilot Mound (where it was first reported), the CDNS report says that the tornado travelled to the vicinity of Jewell, causing severe damage near Stanhope. No damage value was given, but the storm as a whole caused $1.35 million in damage according to the CDNS report.
F2	NE of Winterset to Prairie City to E of Walford	Madison, Warren, Polk, Jasper, Poweshiek, Iowa, Johnson, Linn	IA	42.55°N 94.70°W	03:15–05:00	116 miles (187 km)	100 yards (91 m)	This long-tracked tornado, which may have been a tornado family, was first identified as a funnel cloud near Carson and later near Highland Church in Adair County about an hour before it touched down. It then came down well northeast of Winterset and tracked intermittently east-northeastward into the south side of the Des Moines metropolitan area, passing south of Cumming before striking Norwalk, south of the Des Moines International Airport. It then struck areas north of Prairie Cityand passed near the airports south of Newton and Grinnell. After passing north of Brooklyn and near Hartwick, the tornado passed north of Marengo before finally dissipating north of Ely south of Cedar Rapids. Damage consisted of several barns and crops being destroyed. No damage value was given, although the CDNS report says damage reached $200,000.
F0	WNW of Tampa to SW of Herington	Marion, Dickinson	KS	38.55°N 97.15°W	04:45–?	12.6 miles (20.3 km)	33 yards (30 m)	A small, skipping tornado accompanied by damaging winds and hail damaged or destroyed buildings on three or four farms. Damage totaled $25,000. Buildings destroyed northwest of Council Grove, where a whistling sound was heard, may have been caused by this tornado as well. Wind-driven hail also caused crop damage.
Source: SPC Tornado data, NCDC Storm Events Database, CDNS report, Historical Tornado Cases for North America 1950-1959, Grazulis 1993

=== June 8 event ===
List of confirmed tornadoes – Monday, June 8, 1953
F#	Location	County / Parish	State	Start Coord.	Time (UTC)	Path length	Max width	Summary
F1	NW of Big Springs	Deuel	NE	41.07°N 102.1°W	22:00–?	0.1 miles (0.16 km)	83 yards (76 m)	Three tornadoes touched down in this area with this one being the only one to cause damage, which was estimated at $250.
F0	N of Big Springs	Deuel	NE	41.08°N 102.08°W	22:00–?	0.1 miles (0.16 km)	10 yards (9.1 m)	This was one of three tornadoes to touch down in this area; there was no damage.
F0	ENE of Big Springs	Deuel	NE	41.07°N 102.5°W	22:00–?	0.1 miles (0.16 km)	10 yards (9.1 m)	This was one of three tornadoes to touch down in this area; there was no damage.
F4	Temperance to Southern Erie to ESE of Vienna	Monroe	MI	41.78°N 83.57°W	23:15–?	5.4 miles (8.7 km)	200 yards (180 m)	4 deaths – A total of 15 houses were destroyed and 14 more were damaged by this large and violent, stovepipe tornado. Trucks and cars were hurled through the air as well. Damage was estimated at $250,000 in damage and 18 people were injured.
F4	NE of Deshler to Northern Cygnet to Western Cleveland	Henry, Wood, Sandusky, Erie, Lorain, Cuyahoga	OH	41.22°N 83.90°W	00:00–?	118 miles (190 km)	100 yards (91 m)	17 deaths – This extremely long-tracked tornado, which was likely a tornado family according to Grazulis and the CDNS report, started near Delsher, where the first tornado (F4+) touched down and moved northeast before turning due east and striking the north edge of Cygnet, where homes were swept away at possible F5 intensity, and eight people were killed. This first tornado destroyed a steel and concrete bridge as it passed near Jerry City. The second tornado (F3) touched down east of Kimball, passed south of Ceylon and ended near Vermilion, destroying multiple homes along the path and killing one person. The third tornado (F3) touched down east of Elyria, and tore across Western Cleveland. It killed seven and destroyed at least 100 homes before moving offshore into Lake Erie. 379 people were injured, but no damage value was given.
F3	NE of Manchester, Michigan to SW of Ann Arbor	Washtenaw	MI	42.20°N 84.00°W	00:30–?	11.3 miles (18.2 km)	70 yards (64 m)	1 death – An intense tornado traveled at 15–20 miles per hour (24–32 km/h) through mostly open country. A large tree landed on one house while another house along with three barns and several smaller buildings were leveled. Five people were injured and damage was estimated at $25,000.
F3	Milford	Livingston, Oakland	MI	42.58°N 83.70°W	00:30–?	9.1 miles (14.6 km)	200 yards (180 m)	An intense tornado embedded within an area of strong straight-line winds was spotted as a funnel cloud over Brighton before touching down and damaging several buildings at the GM Proving Grounds five miles (8.0 km) west of Milford. The damage path extended to the center of Milford with the tornado moving at 35–40 miles per hour (56–64 km/h). Four homes, a barn, and 24 cars were destroyed, five stores and a post office were damaged, 11 people were injured, and damages were estimated at $5 million.
F2	E of Sand Lake to N of Oscoda	Iosco	MI	44.33°N 83.63°W	00:40–?	16.6 miles (26.7 km)	833 yards (762 m)	4 deaths – A large, strong tornado, which was accompanied by one-quarter inch (0.64 cm) hail, leveled five vacation cabins, and badly damaged six others. Six other buildings were destroyed as well. The deaths came from a single family at the beginning of the path near Indian Lake. 13 others were injured and losses were estimated at $250,000. The tornado was reported to have had a double funnel in Wilber Township. Grazulis gave the tornado an F3 rating.
F3	S of Spruce	Alcona	MI	44.82°N 83.47°W	01:08–?	1.8 miles (2.9 km)	100 yards (91 m)	Five large barns were destroyed and livestock were killed. Losses totaled $250,000. Grazulis gave the tornado an F2 rating.
F5	N of Flushing to Beecher to N of Columbiaville	Genesee, Lapeer	MI	43.10°N 83.85°W	01:30–?	18.9 miles (30.4 km)	833 yards (762 m)	116 deaths – See article on this tornado – There were 844 injuries.
F0	SW of Caseville	Huron	MI	43.88°N 83.33°W	03:00–?	0.1 miles (160 m)	33 yards (30 m)	A tornado was sighted aloft; no damage occurred.
F4	N of Kings Mill to N of Port Huron	Lapeer, St. Clair	MI	43.15°N 83.18°W	03:30–?	33.8 miles (54.4 km)	833 yards (762 m)	This large and violent tornado formed after the Flint tornado dissipated. Several homes and barns were blown away, 23 people were injured, and losses were estimated at $500,000. It may have also killed a man and seriously injured several of his family members near the St. Clair County line when their home was destroyed, but this is not officially documented.
Source: SPC Tornado data, NCDC Storm Events Database, CDNS report, Historical Tornado Cases for North America 1950-1959, Grazulis 1993

=== June 9 event ===
List of confirmed tornadoes – Tuesday June 9, 1953
F#	Location	County / Parish	State	Start Coord.	Time (UTC)	Path length	Max width	Summary
F4	E of Petersham to Northern Worcester NE of Fayville	Worcester	MA	42.47°N 72.17°W	20:25–?	48 miles (77 km)	1,760 yards (1,610 m)	94 deaths – See article on this tornado – 1,288 people were injured.
F3	Exeter	Rockingham	NH	42.97°N 70.97°W	21:20–?	1.5 miles (2.4 km)	100 yards (91 m)	A strong tornado tore the roofs off 15 homes and businesses in the Jady Hill part of Exeter while also destroying the Exeter Country Club lodge. Five people were injured and losses were estimated at $25,000. The tornado was described as having a double funnel, although one of the funnels did not touch down.
F3	SSW of Millbury to NE of Mansfield	Worcester, Norfolk, Bristol	MA	42.17°N 71.77°W	21:30–?	28 miles (45 km)	667 yards (610 m)	This large, intense tornado formed after the Worcester tornado dissipated and devastated Wrentham, Southern Foxborough and Western Mansfield. Cars and trucks were overturned, numerous trees were downed and homes sustained roof and wall damage. A total of 17 people were injured and losses totaled $7.5 million.
F1	Rollinsford	Strafford	NH	43.23°N 70.83°W	22:00–?	1 mile (1.6 km)	40 yards (37 m)	A weak tornado damaged an orchard, woodland, and a small farm building with losses estimated at $250.
Source: SPC Tornado data, NCDC Storm Events Database, CDNS report, Historical Tornado Cases for North America 1950-1959, Grazulis 1993

=== Arcadia, Nebraska ===
Arcadia, Nebraska
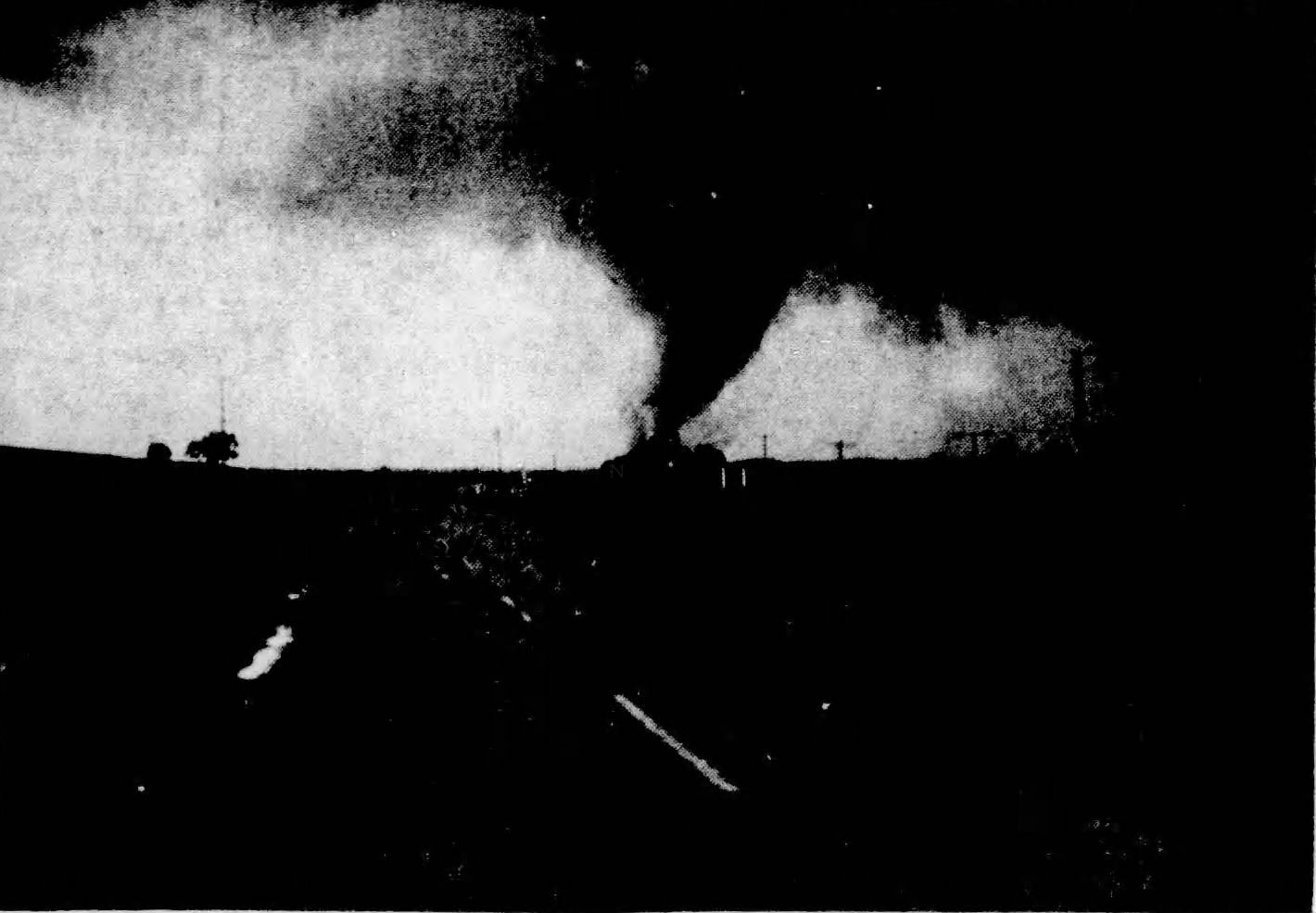
- The tornado seen to the west of Arcadia.

Meteorological history
- Formed: June 7, 1953, 3:15 pm CST (UTC-06:00)

F4 tornado
- on the Fujita scale

Overall effects
- Fatalities: 11
- Injuries: 0
- Damage: $500,000

This tornado formed south of Arcadia, Nebraska around 3:15 p.m. near the Middle Loup River. The tornado first struck a cemetery, where it snapped trees and threw headstones before crossing the river and striking a farm, causing the home to be partially destroyed, with the rest being twisted off its foundation. The tornado then struck another farm, completely destroying the home with the owner inside, who later succumbed to his injuries. The tornado then struck a home made of concrete blocks, completely leveling the home down to its foundation, and a vehicle on the property was thrown 300 yards away from the home and turned into a heap of scrap metal. The tornado reached a quarter mile wide as it struck the home of the Madsen family, where a family reunion was happening at the time of the tornado. The tornado struck the Madsen farm at peak intensity, resulting in the complete annihilation of the home, sweeping the structure off its foundation, and leaving nothing intact. All 10 occupants who were home at the time were killed as their bodies were thrown hundreds of yards among debris. After destroying the Madsen farm, the tornado remained over rural Valley County before lifting soon after. The tornado claimed 11 lives in total, and caused around $500,000 USD (1953) in damages.

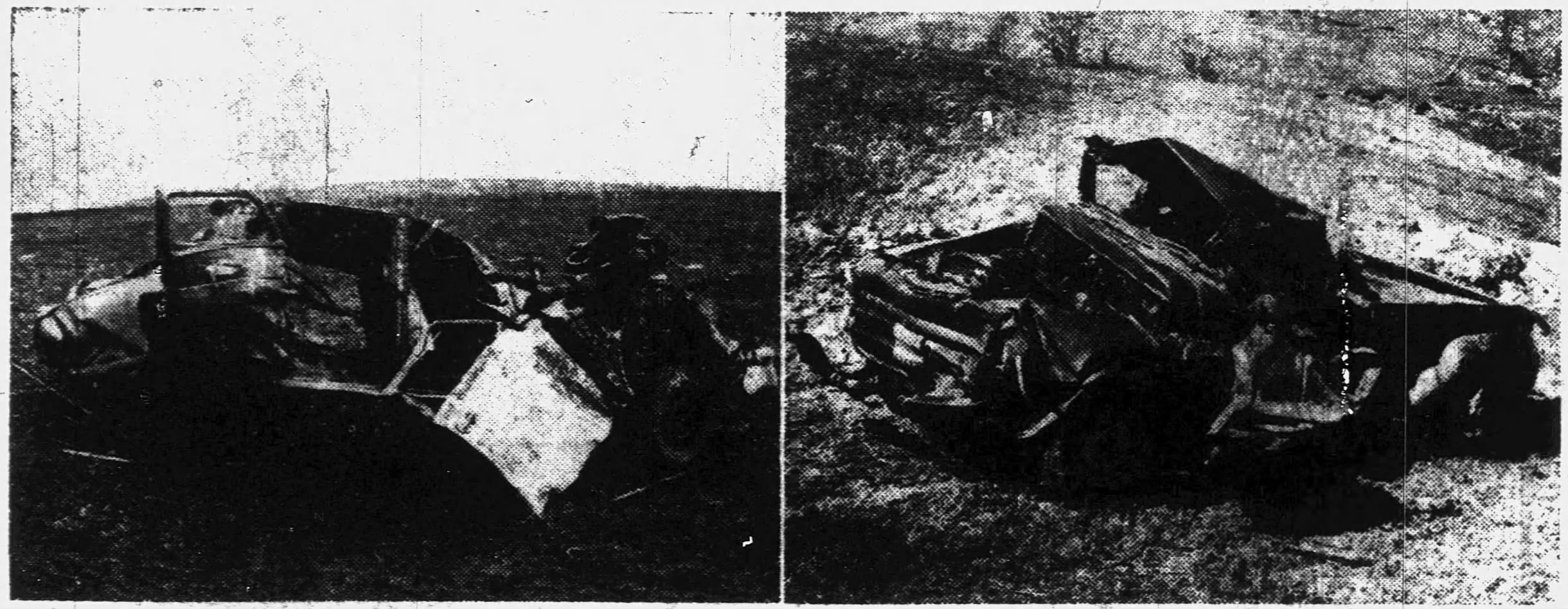
A vehicle that was thrown 300 yards into a hill by the tornado.

=== Flint–Beecher, Michigan ===
Flint–Beecher, Michigan
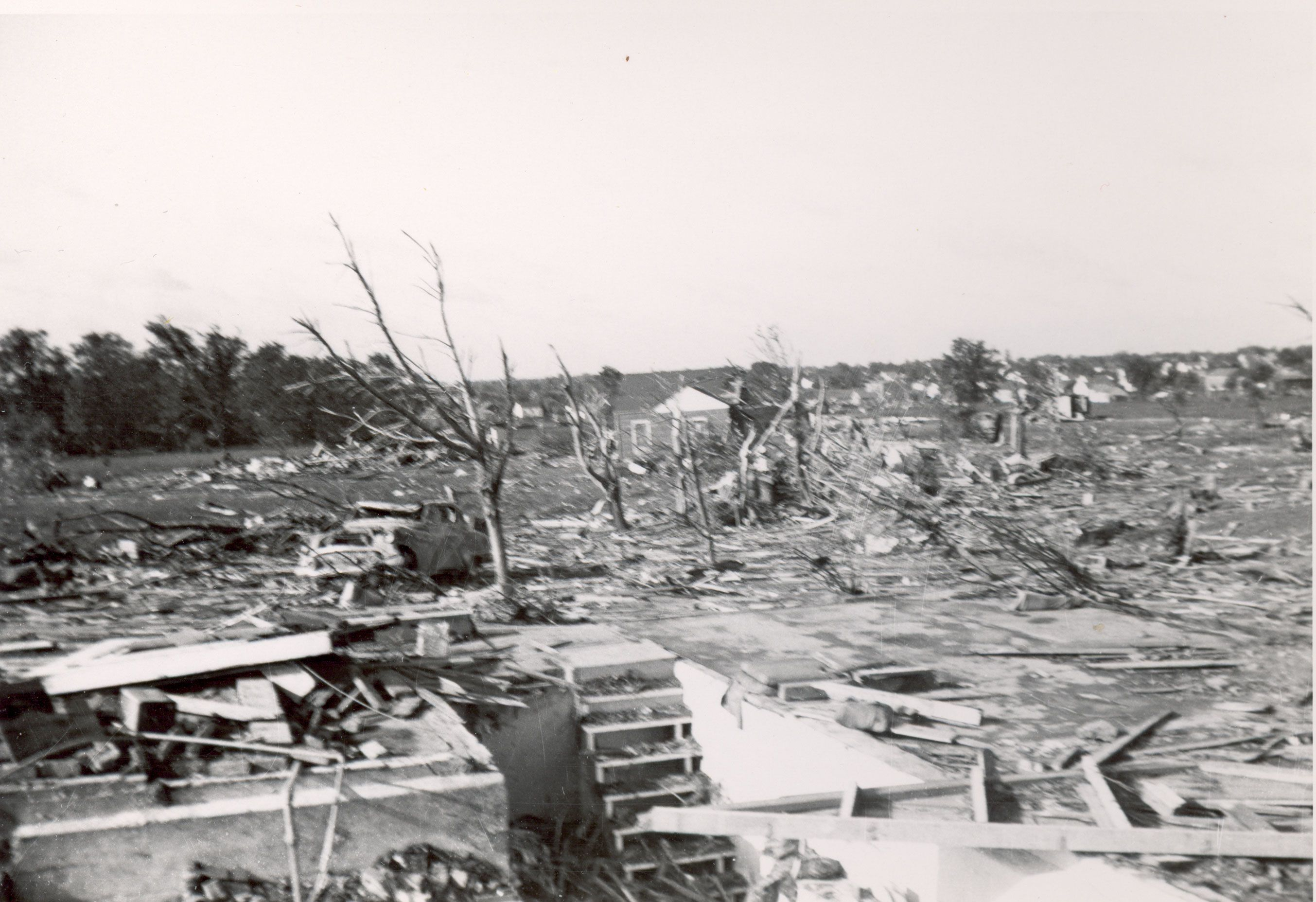
- Tornado damage in Flint, Michigan suburb of Beecher.

Meteorological history
- Formed: June 8, 1953, 8:30 pm EST (UTC−05:00)

F5 tornado
- on the Fujita scale
- Highest winds: >261 mph (420 km/h)

Overall effects
- Fatalities: 116
- Injuries: 844
- Damage: $19 million (1953 USD) $223 million (2024 USD)
- Areas affected: Flint and Beecher, Michigan

This catastrophic, large and violent, multi-vortex F5 tornado was one of the deadliest tornadoes ever recorded in the United States, devastating the Flint, Michigan suburb of Beecher. The tornado first formed at about 8:30 p.m. on June 8 north of Flushing, Michigan. The tornado than moved eastward along Coldwater Road, moving directly through Beecher, Michigan with little to no warning, obliterating almost every structure in its path. Multiple deaths were reported in 20 families, and it was reported that papers from Flint were deposited in Sarnia, Ontario, Canada, some 60 miles (100 km) east of Flint. Large sections of neighborhoods were completely swept away, with only foundations left. Trees were debarked and vehicles were thrown and mangled and the Beecher High School was heavily damaged. Many patrons at the North Flint Drive-in theater evacuated the drive-in in their vehicles. Some got into vehicle crashes in the ensuing panic to flee while others inadvertently drove into the path of the tornado after leaving the theater. The theater itself received only minor damage. The tornado then moved east-northeastward, causing additional damaged before dissipating near Columbiaville. One hundred and sixteen were killed, making it the tenth deadliest tornado in U.S. history. The death toll was surpassed by the 2011 Joplin tornado. It is also one of only two F5 tornadoes ever to occur in Michigan. Another F5 tornado would hit in Hudsonville on April 3, 1956.

=== Worcester, Massachusetts ===
Worcester, Massachusetts
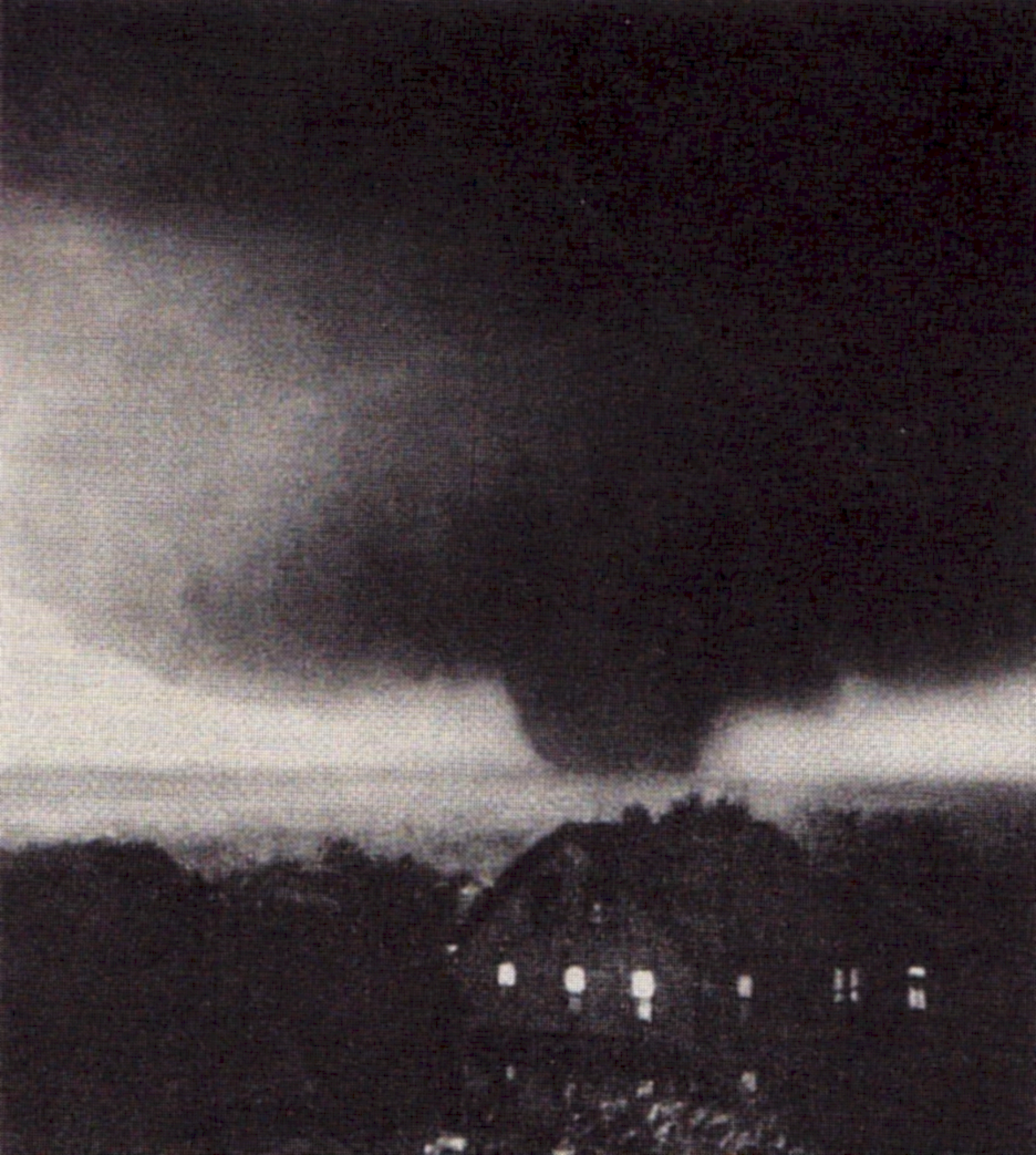
- The tornado at peak intensity as seen from Lake Quinsingamond

Meteorological history
- Formed: June 9, 1953, 4:25 p.m. EDT (UTC−04:00)
- Dissipated: June 9, 1953, 5:43 p.m. EDT (UTC−04:00)
- Duration: 1 hour and 18 minutes

F4 tornado
- on the Fujita scale

Overall effects
- Fatalities: 94
- Injuries: 1,288
- Damage: $52.193 million (1953 USD)

The storm system that created the Flint tornado moved eastward over southern Ontario and Lake Erie during the early morning hours of June 9. As radar was still primitive (or nonexistent) in 1953, inadequate severe weather predictions resulted. (Even during the Super Outbreak of April 3, 1974, weather radar was still not up to this task; that outbreak resulted in a technological upgrade.) The Weather Bureau in Buffalo, New York merely predicted thunderstorms and said that "a tornado may occur." As early as 10:00 a.m. EST, however, the Weather Bureau in Boston anticipated the likelihood of tornadic conditions that afternoon but feared the word "tornado" would strike panic in the public, and refrained from using it. Instead, as a compromise, they issued New England's first-ever severe thunderstorm watch.

Rain fell across Worcester County throughout the day on June 9. In New York, a strong cluster of thunderstorms began to build, moving eastward into Massachusetts. At approximately 4:25 p.m., a funnel cloud formed near the Quabbin Reservoir near New Salem. Very soon after, the tornado developed in a forest outside of the rural community of Petersham. The tornado then proceeded to pass through a farm field, where it struck a farmhouse and killed two people. As the storm moved eastward at approximately 35 miles per hour (56 km/h), it hit the towns of Rutland and Holden, where 11 people were killed in total.

At about 5:00 p.m., the tornado moved into the city of Worcester, alarming many residents. According to eyewitness accounts, the storm moved in extremely quickly, shocking the townsfolk. "I saw it grow noticeably darker," said eyewitness George Carlson, "Then it hit. Houses tumbled, trees fell, and it was all over. The tornado was definitely discernible. Like when you can see the lines of rain in an approaching rainstorm," he added. The tornado, which had grown to one mile (1.6 km) in width, destroyed several structures in Northern Worcester, including parts of Assumption College. Other major structures included a newly built factory and a large residential development. Residential areas were devastated and entire rows of homes were swept away at possible F5 intensity.

At approximately 5:20 p.m., the tornado crossed the far north end of Lake Quinsigamond, and began to move through Shrewsbury. Transmission towers were snapped in half, cutting off power to thousands of people in Shrewsbury and the surrounding towns. Dozens of homes between Maple Avenue and Grafton Street were destroyed, some completely swept away. The funnel maintained its one-mile (1.6 km) width as it passed throughout much of Shrewsbury, and still dealt a high degree of damage when it moved through downtown Westborough, where it began curving towards the northeast in its final leg. In the storm's final moments, three were killed when Fayville Post Office in Southborough collapsed. Around the time it ended, at 5:45 p.m., a tornado warning was issued, although by then it was too late.

The final death toll was 94, the highest number of deaths ever resulting from an F4/EF4 tornado. 1,288 other people were injured.

== 1953 tornado season in perspective ==
Outbreak death toll
State	Total	County	County total
Massachusetts	94	Worcester	94
Michigan	125	Genesee	116
Michigan	125	Iosco	4
Michigan	125	Monroe	4
Michigan	125	Washtenaw	1
Nebraska	11	Valley	11
Ohio	17	Cuyahoga	6
Ohio	17	Erie	2
Ohio	17	Henry	5
Ohio	17	Lorain	1
Ohio	17	Wood	3
Totals	251		
All deaths were tornado-related

The year 1953 saw some of the deadliest tornadoes in U.S. history, including the Waco tornado that hit on May 11, the Flint tornado of June 8, and the Worcester tornado on June 9. These 3 storms were also unique in occurring within a 30-day period.

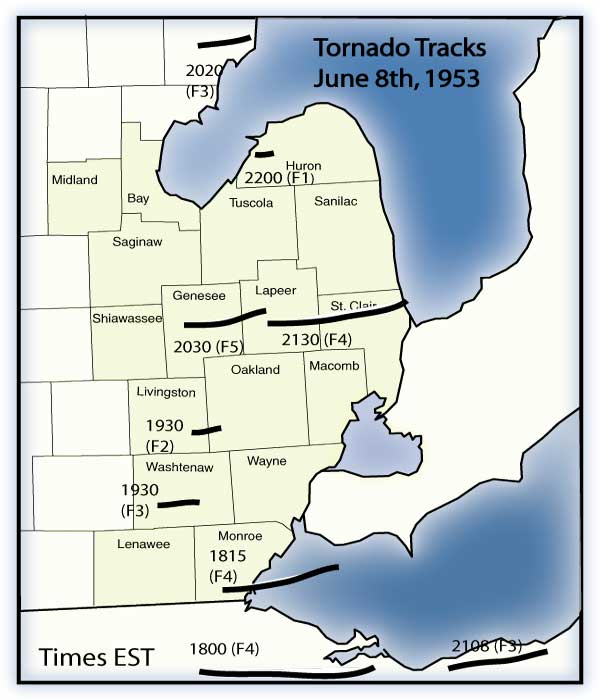
Tornado tracks around Lake Erie from the June 8, 1953 tornado outbreak.

Other severe tornadoes of 1953 hit Warner Robins, Georgia in April, San Angelo, Texas in May (same day as Waco), Port Huron, Michigan later in May, Cleveland in June (same day as Flint and the day before Worcester), and Vicksburg, Mississippi in December.

== See also ==
- List of North American tornadoes and tornado outbreaks
- 2011 New England tornado outbreak
