= Lincoln Hotel =

Lincoln Hotel or Hotel Lincoln may refer to:

== United States ==
- Lincoln Hotel (San Diego), part of the Gaslamp Quarter Historic District in San Diego, California
- Lincoln Hotel, part of the Downtown Loveland Historic District in Loveland, Colorado
- Lincoln Hotel (Melbourne, Florida), now Florida Preparatory Academy
- Urbana-Lincoln Hotel-Lincoln Square Mall, Urbana, Illinois, listed on the National Register of Historic Places in Champaign County, Illinois
- Lincoln Hotel, part of the State Street Commercial Historic District in Hammond, Indiana
- Lincoln Hotel (Lowden, Iowa), listed on the NRHP in Cedar County, Iowa
- Lincoln Hotel (Franklin, Nebraska), listed on the NRHP in Franklin County, Nebraska
- Hotel Lincoln (Lincoln, Nebraska), run by the Eppley Hotel Company
- Lincoln Hotel (Scottsbluff, Nebraska), listed on the NRHP in Scotts Bluff County, Nebraska
- Hotel Lincoln (New York City), now the Row NYC Hotel
- Hotel Lincoln (Stroud, Oklahoma), listed on the NRHP in Lincoln County, Oklahoma
- Hotel Lincoln (Marion, Virginia), listed on the NRHP in Smyth County, Virginia
- Lincoln Hotel (Harrington, Washington), listed on the NRHP in Lincoln County, Washington

== Other places ==
- Broadview Hotel (Toronto), Canada; formerly known at the Lincoln Hotel
- Hotel Lincoln (Casablanca), an Art Deco hotel in Africa
- Row NYC Hotel, New York, formerly known as Hotel Lincoln

== See also ==
- President Abraham Lincoln Hotel, Springfield, Illinois
