= First Congregational Church, U.C.C. (Naponee, Nebraska) =

Historic church in Nebraska, United States

- U.S. National Register of Historic Places
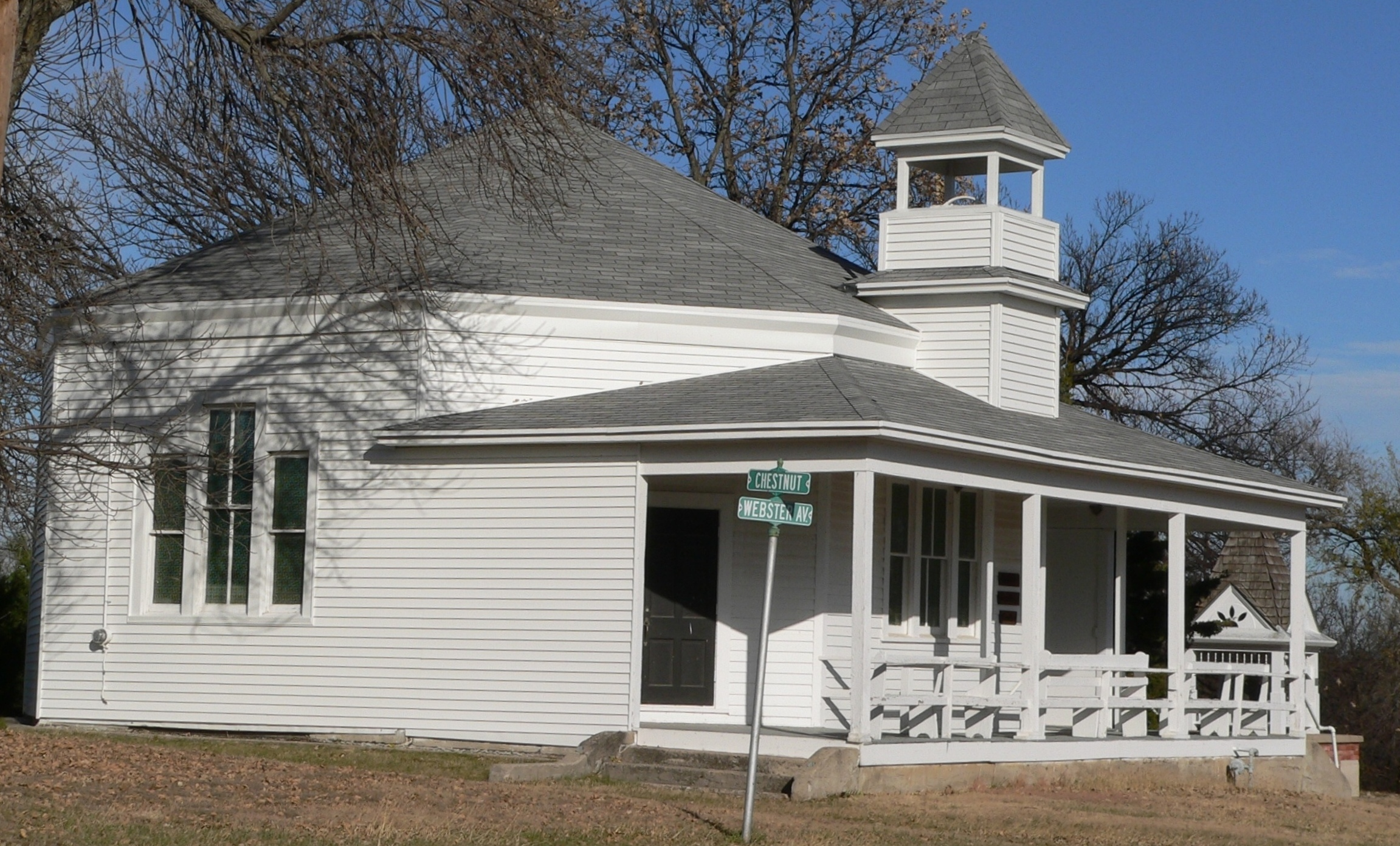

- Location within Nebraska Location within the United States
- Location: Off NE 31C; Naponee, Nebraska
- Coordinates: 40°4′42″N 99°8′31″W
- Area: 0.3 acres (0.12 ha)
- Built: 1887
- Architectural style: Octagon Mode
- NRHP reference No.: 82003188
- Added to NRHP: September 14, 1982

First Congregational Church, U.C.C. (also known as Naponee Heritage Center; Naponee Octagon Church) is a historic church building off NE 31C in Naponee, Nebraska.

It was built in 1887 and was added to the National Register in 1982.

It is one of only two octagonal church buildings in the state, the other being the People's Unitarian Church in Ord, Nebraska.
