= People's Unitarian Church =

Historic church in Nebraska, United States

- Formerly listed on the U.S. National Register of Historic Places
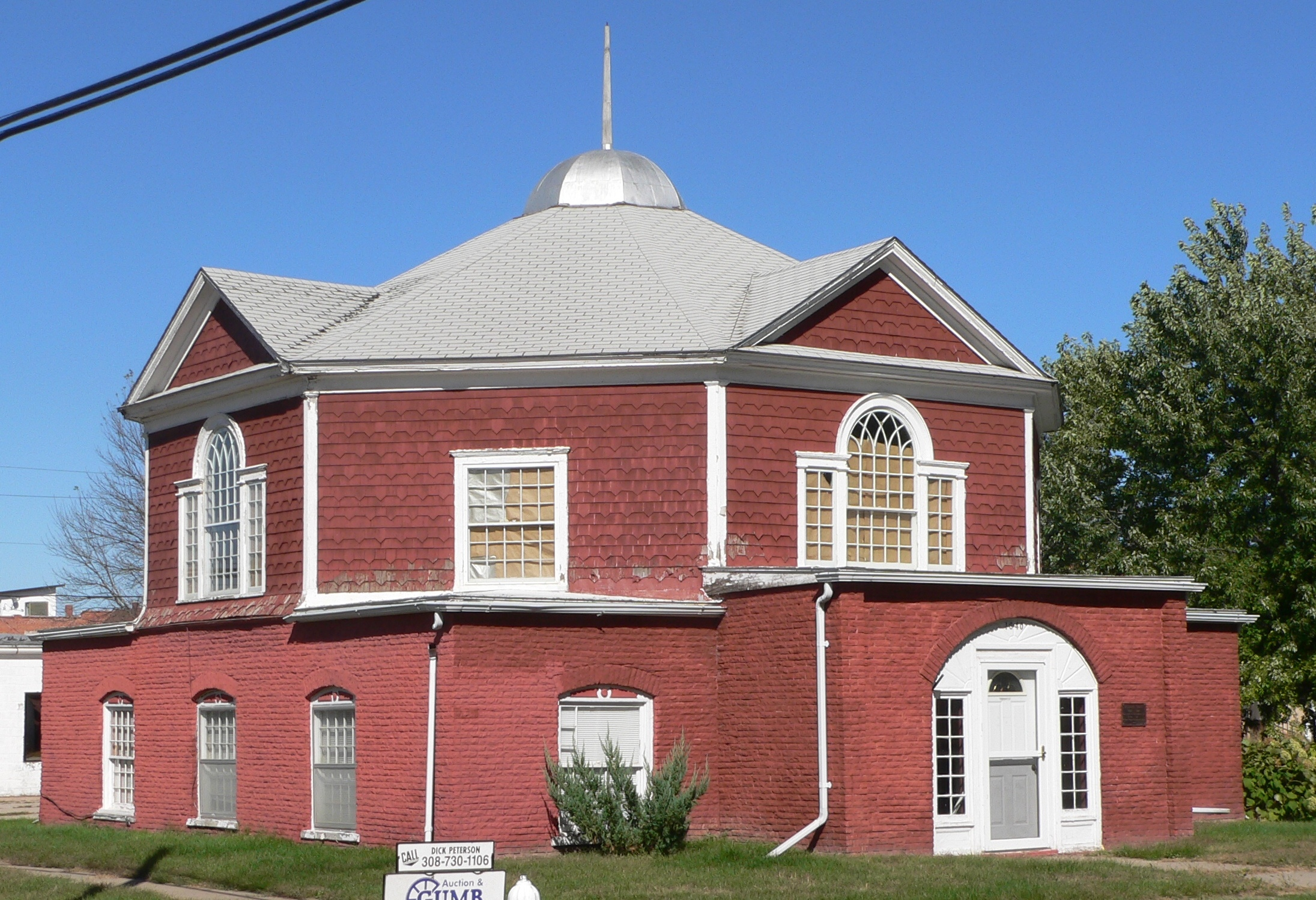

- Location within Nebraska Location within the United States
- Location: 1640 N St., Ord, Nebraska
- Coordinates: 41°36′5″N 98°55′48″W
- Area: less than one acre
- Built: 1901
- Built by: Wentworth, William
- NRHP reference No.: 84002497

Significant dates
- Added to NRHP: June 14, 1984
- Removed from NRHP: July 24, 2017

The People's Unitarian Church, at 1640 N St. in Ord, Nebraska, was built in 1901. It was listed on the National Register of Historic Places in 1984. In 2017, it was removed from the National Register.

It has been described as perhaps one of the most unusual church buildings in the state, as it has a square, brick first level, about 3 feet (0.91 m) below grade, and a wood-shingled octagonal second level. The second level holds the church meeting hall, approximately 37 feet (11 m) in diameter. As of 1983, it was one of only two octagonal churches in Nebraska (the other being the First Congregational Church at Naponee, in Franklin County, NRHP-listed in 1982, a one-story 1887-built frame structure).

It was built for cost of about $2,500, and it served as a church only from 1901 to 1911. The Ord church was formed as a Unitarian Society in 1899 by parishioners of Rev. A. H. Tyrer, who was forced to resign from the Episcopal Church for his liberal views. The church had financial difficulties, discontinued services in 1911, and disbanded in 1914. The church building was sold to the Commodore Foote Post No. 40 of the Grand Army of the Republic. It served as a club and meeting hall for that group, then from 1921 to 1961 it served in the same way for the Ord Fidelity Post No. 38 of the American Legion.

As of 1983, it was in good condition, little changed from its construction.

Up to 1983, Unitarian Society churches were known to have been formed in just five Nebraska towns and cities. The only other NRHP-listed Unitarian church in the state was the First Unitarian Church of Omaha.
