= Kid Willson =

American baseball player (1895–1964)

- Outfielder
- Born: November 3, 1895; Bloomington, Nebraska, U.S.
- Died: April 17, 1964 (aged 68); Union Gap, Washington, U.S.
- Batted: Left Threw: Left

MLB debut
- July 2, 1918, for the Chicago White Sox

Last MLB appearance
- June 23, 1927, for the Chicago White Sox

MLB statistics
- Batting average: .091
- Home runs: 0
- Runs batted in: 1
- Stats at Baseball Reference

Teams
- Chicago White Sox (1918, 1927)

Frank Hoxie "Kid" Willson (November 3, 1895 – April 17, 1964) was an American professional baseball player. He played parts of two seasons in Major League Baseball nine years apart, in 1918 and 1927, both for the Chicago White Sox. He was primarily used as a pinch hitter, appearing just twice in the field, once as a left fielder and once as a center fielder, among his eleven major league games.
