= Franklin County, Nebraska =

County in Nebraska, United States

- County
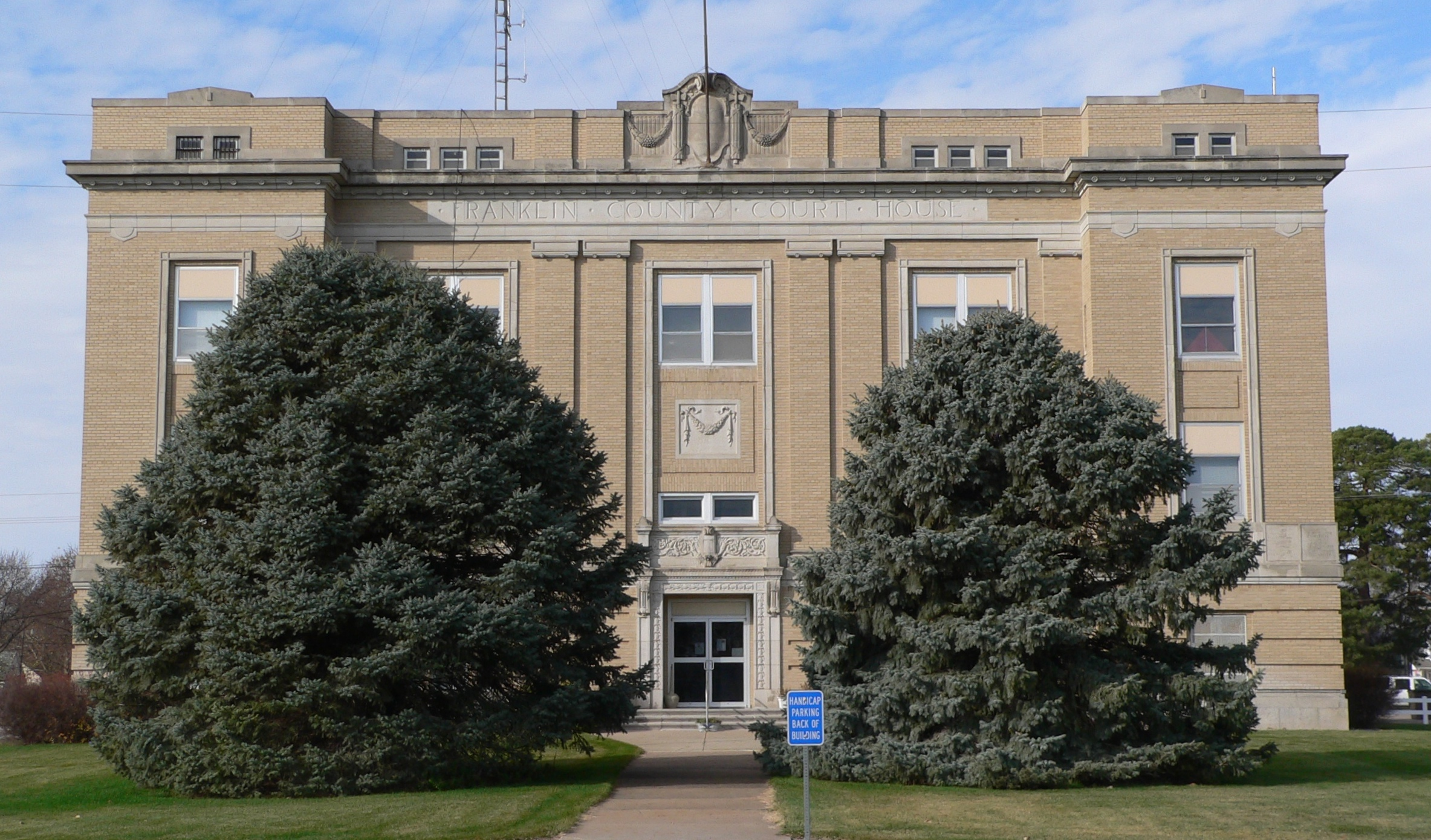
- Franklin County Courthouse in Franklin

- Location within the U.S. state of Nebraska
- Coordinates: 40°11′N 98°57′W
- Country: United States
- State: Nebraska
- Founded: 1867 (authorized); 1871 (organized)
- Named for: Benjamin Franklin
- Seat: Franklin
- Largest city: Franklin

Area
  - Total: 576 sq mi (1,490 km^{2})
  - Land: 576 sq mi (1,490 km^{2})
  - Water: 0.2 sq mi (0.52 km^{2}) 0.03%

Population (2020)
  - Total: 2,889
  - Estimate (2025): 2,795 ▼
  - Density: 5.02/sq mi (1.94/km^{2})
- Time zone: UTC−6 (Central)
  - Summer (DST): UTC−5 (CDT)
- Congressional district: 3rd
- Website: franklincountyne.gov

Franklin County is a county in the U.S. state of Nebraska. As of the 2020 census, the population was 2,889. Its county seat is Franklin. The county was formed in 1867 and organized in 1871. It was named for Benjamin Franklin. In the Nebraska license plate system, Franklin County is represented by the prefix 50 (it had the 50th-largest number of vehicles registered in the county when the license plate system was established in 1922).

== History ==
The settlement of Franklin County began after General Eugene Carr's 1869 Republican River Expedition subdued the Cheyenne in the area. In Organized settlements appeared starting in 1870, with the Thompson Colony establishing Riverton along Thompson Creek in September, followed by the Republican Land and Claim Association (also called the Knight Colony) founding Franklin on November 25.

Franklin County was officially established on March 3, 1871, by Governor David Butler's proclamation, with Franklin as the initial county seat. In 1872, however, the Plattsmouth Town Company founded Waterloo (later Bloomington) a mile east, igniting a fierce contest for the county seat. An 1872 election favored Bloomington, but irregularities culminating in the 1874 theft of county records by Bloomington supporters delayed the shift until Bloomington, bolstered by its designation as a U.S. Land Office site, prevailed in another election later that year. The arrival of the Burlington & Missouri River Railroad in Franklin in 1879 drove population growth in the county from a handful of settlers in 1870 to over 5,000 by 1882.

The first schoolhouse opened in Franklin in 1872, followed by the Franklin Academy in 1881. Religious life took root with the Methodist Episcopal Church organizing in Franklin in 1872, while commerce grew with the county's first newspaper, the Franklin County Guardsman, launched in 1874 by H.W. Fallaws. By the early 20th century, Franklin had emerged as a more prosperous and centrally located town than Bloomington. The issue came to a head in 1920 when Franklin petitioned for a new county seat election. On November 2, 1920, voters overwhelmingly favored moving the seat back to Franklin, finally ending the county seat dispute.^{:377}

== Geography ==
Franklin County lies on the south line of Nebraska. Its south boundary line abuts the north boundary line of the state of Kansas. The Republican River flows eastward through the southern part of Franklin County.

According to the US Census Bureau, the county has a total area of 576 square miles (1,490 km^{2}), of which 576 square miles (1,490 km^{2}) is land and 0.2 square miles (0.52 km^{2}) (0.03%) is water.

=== Major highways ===
- U.S. Highway 136
- Nebraska Highway 4
- Nebraska Highway 10
- Nebraska Highway 44

=== Adjacent counties ===
- Kearney County - north
- Webster County - east
- Smith County, Kansas - southeast
- Phillips County, Kansas - southwest
- Harlan County - west
- Phelps County - northwest

== Demographics ==
Historical population
Census	Pop.	Note	%±
1870	26		—
1880	5,465		20,919.2%
1890	7,693		40.8%
1900	9,455		22.9%
1910	10,303		9.0%
1920	10,067		−2.3%
1930	9,094		−9.7%
1940	7,740		−14.9%
1950	7,096		−8.3%
1960	5,449		−23.2%
1970	4,566		−16.2%
1980	4,377		−4.1%
1990	3,938		−10.0%
2000	3,574		−9.2%
2010	3,225		−9.8%
2020	2,889		−10.4%
2025 (est.)	2,795	▼	−3.3%
US Decennial Census; 1790-1960 1900-1990; 1990-2000 2010-2013

=== 2020 census ===
As of the 2020 census, the county had a population of 2,889. The median age was 48.7 years. 21.4% of residents were under the age of 18 and 28.0% of residents were 65 years of age or older. For every 100 females there were 105.2 males, and for every 100 females age 18 and over there were 101.0 males age 18 and over.

The racial makeup of the county was 95.5% White, 0.2% Black or African American, 0.2% American Indian and Alaska Native, 0.6% Asian, 0.0% Native Hawaiian and Pacific Islander, 1.1% from some other race, and 2.4% from two or more races. Hispanic or Latino residents of any race comprised 2.8% of the population.

0.0% of residents lived in urban areas, while 100.0% lived in rural areas.

There were 1,285 households in the county, of which 24.2% had children under the age of 18 living with them and 21.0% had a female householder with no spouse or partner present. About 31.1% of all households were made up of individuals and 16.6% had someone living alone who was 65 years of age or older.

There were 1,527 housing units, of which 15.8% were vacant. Among occupied housing units, 81.0% were owner-occupied and 19.0% were renter-occupied. The homeowner vacancy rate was 2.1% and the rental vacancy rate was 14.4%.

=== 2000 census ===
As of the 2000 United States census, there were 3,574 people, 1,485 households, and 1,021 families in the county. The population density was 6 people per square mile (2.3 people/km^{2}). There were 1,746 housing units at an average density of 3 units per square mile (1.2/km^{2}).

The racial makeup of the county was 99.24% White, 0.28% Native American, 0.06% Asian, 0.08% from other races, and 0.34% from two or more races. 0.64% of the population were Hispanic or Latino of any race. 63.5% were of German, 6.8% American, 6.6% English and 5.7% Irish ancestry.

There were 1,485 households, out of which 28.60% had children under the age of 18 living with them, 59.40% were married couples living together, 6.00% had a female householder with no husband present, and 31.20% were non-families. 29.20% of all households were made up of individuals, and 16.00% had someone living alone who was 65 years of age or older. The average household size was 2.34 and the average family size was 2.87.

The county population contained 24.50% under the age of 18, 4.50% from 18 to 24, 23.60% from 25 to 44, 23.50% from 45 to 64, and 23.90% who were 65 years of age or older. The median age was 43 years. For every 100 females there were 92.80 males. For every 100 females age 18 and over, there were 91.00 males.

The median income for a household in the county was $29,304, and the median income for a family was $34,958. Males had a median income of $26,192 versus $18,214 for females. The per capita income for the county was $15,390. About 9.70% of families and 13.20% of the population were below the poverty line, including 17.20% of those under age 18 and 9.40% of those age 65 or over.

== Communities ==
=== City ===
- Franklin

=== Villages ===
- Bloomington
- Campbell
- Hildreth
- Naponee
- Riverton
- Upland

=== Unincorporated community ===
- Macon

== Politics ==
Franklin County voters have been reliably Republican for decades. In no national election since 1964 has the county selected the Democratic Party candidate (as of 2024).

United States presidential election results for Franklin County, Nebraska
Year	Republican		Democratic		Third party(ies)	
Year	No.	%	No.	%	No.	%
1900	984	45.47%	1,122	51.85%	58	2.68%
1904	1,269	58.56%	471	21.74%	427	19.70%
1908	1,083	43.74%	1,298	52.42%	95	3.84%
1912	332	14.15%	1,148	48.91%	867	36.94%
1916	1,081	43.24%	1,345	53.80%	74	2.96%
1920	2,294	67.41%	1,030	30.27%	79	2.32%
1924	1,920	51.27%	1,331	35.54%	494	13.19%
1928	2,533	63.44%	1,443	36.14%	17	0.43%
1932	1,404	34.32%	2,633	64.36%	54	1.32%
1936	1,685	40.46%	2,350	56.42%	130	3.12%
1940	2,354	63.08%	1,378	36.92%	0	0.00%
1944	2,085	68.27%	969	31.73%	0	0.00%
1948	1,555	53.71%	1,340	46.29%	0	0.00%
1952	2,438	75.88%	775	24.12%	0	0.00%
1956	1,955	68.77%	888	31.23%	0	0.00%
1960	1,798	64.19%	1,003	35.81%	0	0.00%
1964	1,241	46.83%	1,409	53.17%	0	0.00%
1968	1,447	65.03%	626	28.13%	152	6.83%
1972	1,510	71.60%	599	28.40%	0	0.00%
1976	1,170	54.09%	941	43.50%	52	2.40%
1980	1,675	73.95%	441	19.47%	149	6.58%
1984	1,597	75.08%	522	24.54%	8	0.38%
1988	1,294	62.06%	768	36.83%	23	1.10%
1992	969	48.87%	477	24.05%	537	27.08%
1996	1,013	59.03%	483	28.15%	220	12.82%
2000	1,196	71.70%	420	25.18%	52	3.12%
2004	1,277	74.50%	412	24.04%	25	1.46%
2008	1,079	69.52%	442	28.48%	31	2.00%
2012	1,112	72.40%	384	25.00%	40	2.60%
2016	1,347	80.51%	250	14.94%	76	4.54%
2020	1,437	83.16%	276	15.97%	15	0.87%
2024	1,351	84.17%	236	14.70%	18	1.12%

== See also ==
- National Register of Historic Places listings in Franklin County, Nebraska
