= Lincoln Hotel (Lowden, Iowa) =

- U.S. National Register of Historic Places
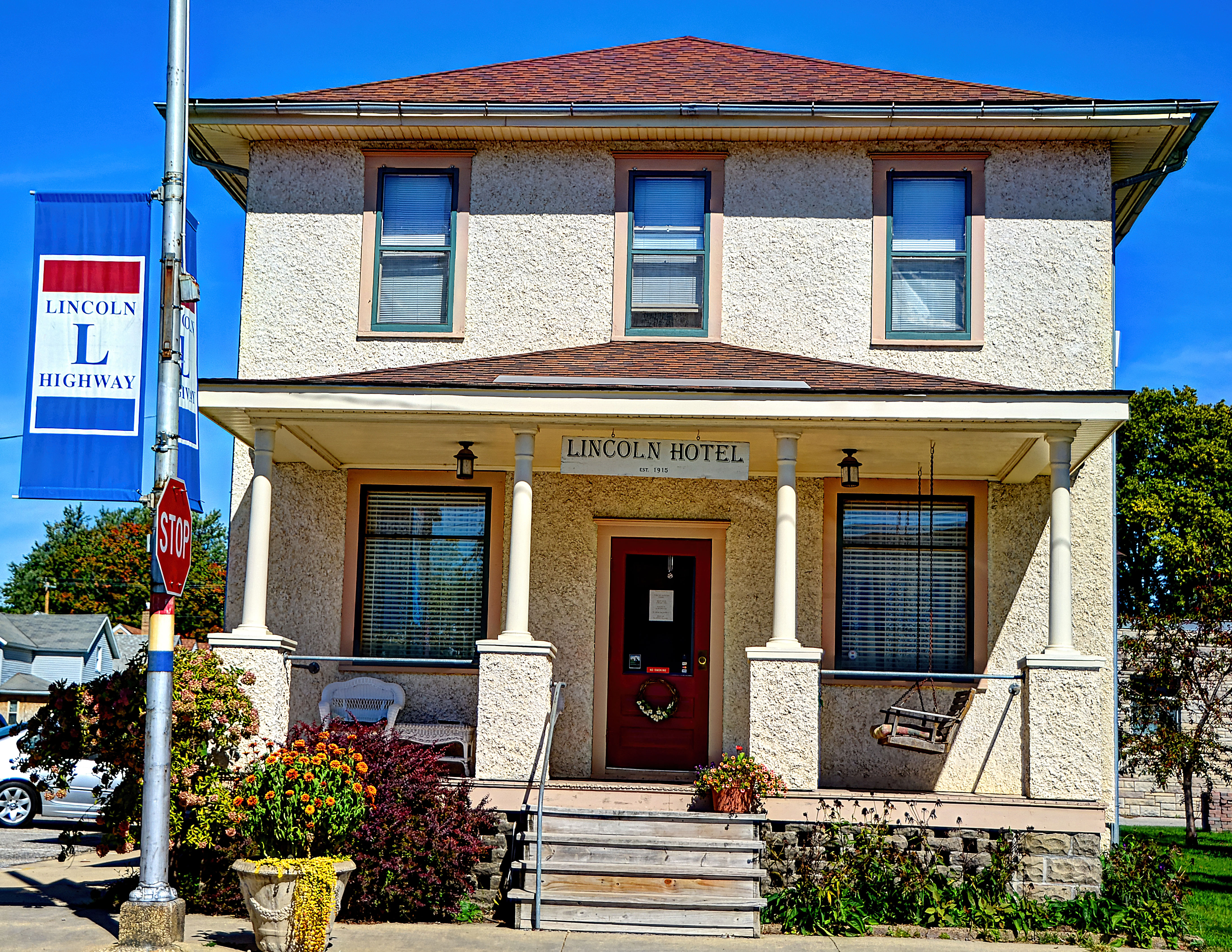

- Location within Iowa Location within the United States
- Location: 408 Main St. Lowden, Iowa
- Coordinates: 41°51′28.17″N 90°55′35.64″W
- Area: less than one acre
- Built: 1915
- Built by: Emil Mahlstedt
- Architectural style: Late 19th and early 20th Century Revivals
- NRHP reference No.: 96000699
- Added to NRHP: June 28, 1996

The Lincoln Hotel is a historic building located in Lowden, Iowa, United States. It was listed on the National Register of Historic Places in 1996. The Lincoln Highway was established in 1913 and passed through Lowden. This hotel was built in 1915 to accommodate the travelers that passed through town. Celia Clemmens, who operated the railroad hotel in town, and her husband A.F. Clemmens built and operated this hotel as well. The hotel is a two-story, rectangular structure with an exterior covered with pebble dash stucco. The shallow-pitched hip roof, wide eaves and the stucco finish reflect the influence of the Prairie School, while the Tuscan columns on the porch and crown window moldings reflect the Neoclassical style. Off the front porch the first floor housed a small lobby, guest parlor and dining room, and the owner's living quarters. The second floor housed the twelve guest rooms and two bathrooms. A first floor addition built in 1920 to increase the size of the owner's quarters has subsequently been removed. The Lincoln Highway in Iowa became U.S. Route 30 in the 1920s, and it was realigned in the mid-1950s just to the south of Lowden. The hotel was able to stay in business until 1981. The building sat empty for the next twelve years before it was converted into apartments from 1994 to 1995.
