= Upland, Nebraska =

- Village
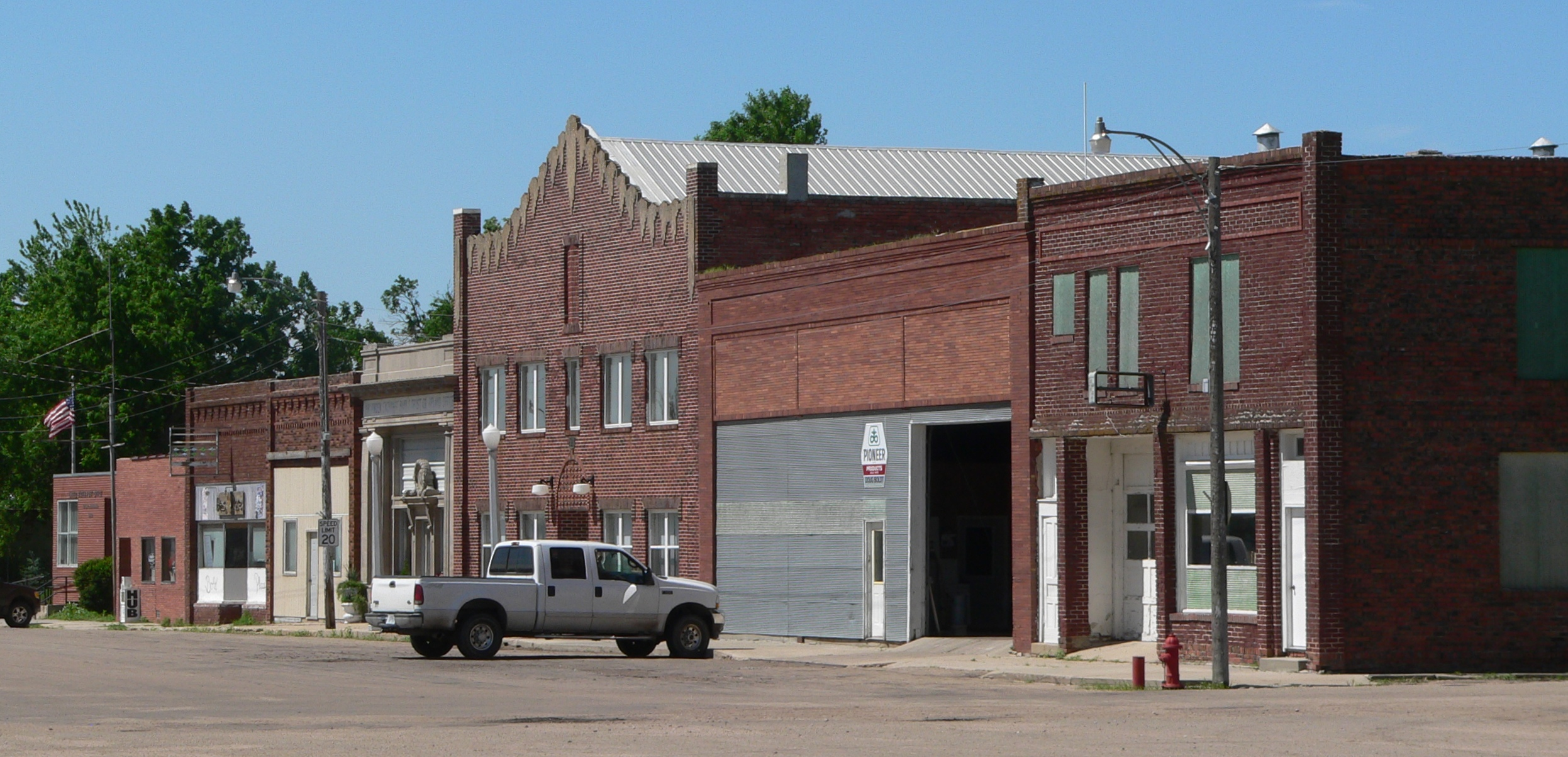
- Downtown Upland: Prairie Avenue

- Location of Upland, Nebraska
- Coordinates: 40°19′10″N 98°54′09″W
- Country: United States
- State: Nebraska
- County: Franklin

Area
  - Total: 0.44 sq mi (1.13 km^{2})
  - Land: 0.44 sq mi (1.13 km^{2})
  - Water: 0 sq mi (0.00 km^{2})
- Elevation: 2,165 ft (660 m)

Population (2020)
  - Total: 125
  - Density: 285.9/sq mi (110.37/km^{2})
- Time zone: UTC-6 (Central (CST))
  - Summer (DST): UTC-5 (CDT)
- ZIP code: 68981
- Area code: 402
- FIPS code: 31-49880
- GNIS feature ID: 2400030

Upland is a village in Franklin County, Nebraska, United States. As of the 2020 census, Upland had a population of 125.

== History ==
Upland was incorporated as a village in 1894. It was so named due to its lofty elevation.

== Geography ==
According to the United States Census Bureau, the village has a total area of 0.41 square miles (1.06 km^{2}), all land.

== Demographics ==
Historical population
Census	Pop.	Note	%±
1900	281		—
1910	390		38.8%
1920	433		11.0%
1930	367		−15.2%
1940	317		−13.6%
1950	251		−20.8%
1960	237		−5.6%
1970	205		−13.5%
1980	192		−6.3%
1990	169		−12.0%
2000	179		5.9%
2010	143		−20.1%
2020	125		−12.6%
U.S. Decennial Census

=== 2010 census ===
As of the census of 2010, there were 143 people, 58 households, and 40 families residing in the village. The population density was 348.8 inhabitants per square mile (134.7/km^{2}). There were 83 housing units at an average density of 202.4 per square mile (78.1/km^{2}). The racial makeup of the village was 99.3% White and 0.7% from other races. Hispanic or Latino of any race were 1.4% of the population.

There were 58 households, of which 31.0% had children under the age of 18 living with them, 48.3% were married couples living together, 12.1% had a female householder with no husband present, 8.6% had a male householder with no wife present, and 31.0% were non-families. 25.9% of all households were made up of individuals, and 6.9% had someone living alone who was 65 years of age or older. The average household size was 2.47 and the average family size was 2.93.

The median age in the village was 42.5 years. 26.6% of residents were under the age of 18; 4.9% were between the ages of 18 and 24; 22.4% were from 25 to 44; 35% were from 45 to 64; and 11.2% were 65 years of age or older. The gender makeup of the village was 49.0% male and 51.0% female.

=== 2000 census ===
As of the census of 2000, there were 179 people, 70 households, and 51 families residing in the village. The population density was 433.9 inhabitants per square mile (167.5/km^{2}). There were 88 housing units at an average density of 213.3 per square mile (82.4/km^{2}). The racial makeup of the village was 97.77% White, 1.68% Native American, 0.56% from other races. Hispanic or Latino of any race were 2.23% of the population.

There were 70 households, out of which 38.6% had children under the age of 18 living with them, 57.1% were married couples living together, 10.0% had a female householder with no husband present, and 27.1% were non-families. 24.3% of all households were made up of individuals, and 4.3% had someone living alone who was 65 years of age or older. The average household size was 2.56 and the average family size was 3.04.

In the village, the population was spread out, with 31.8% under the age of 18, 4.5% from 18 to 24, 31.3% from 25 to 44, 17.9% from 45 to 64, and 14.5% who were 65 years of age or older. The median age was 36 years. For every 100 females, there were 103.4 males. For every 100 females age 18 and over, there were 96.8 males.

As of 2000 the median income for a household in the village was $29,792, and the median income for a family was $35,625. Males had a median income of $29,500 versus $18,750 for females. The per capita income for the village was $15,284. About 12.1% of families and 11.2% of the population were below the poverty line, including 12.5% of those under the age of eighteen and 7.7% of those 65 or over.
