= Lincoln Hotel (Franklin, Nebraska) =

- Formerly listed on the U.S. National Register of Historic Places
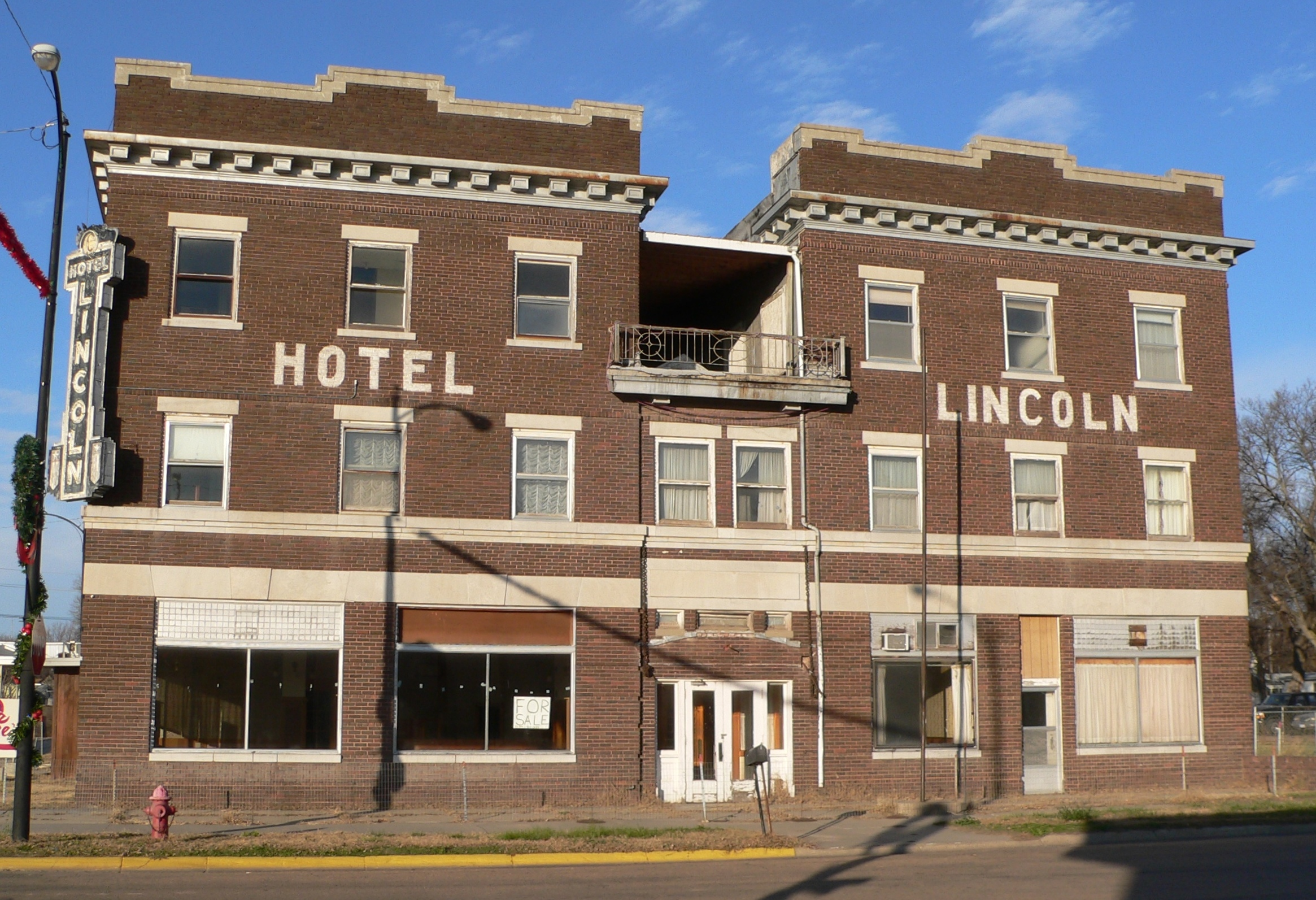

- Location within Nebraska Location within the United States
- Location: 519 15th Ave., Franklin, Nebraska
- Coordinates: 40°5′47″N 98°57′13″W
- Built: 1918; 108 years ago
- Architect: Nebraska Hotel Co.
- Architectural style: Colonial Revival, Georgian Revival
- NRHP reference No.: 89000799

Significant dates
- Added to NRHP: July 6, 1989
- Removed from NRHP: March 22, 2016

Lincoln Hotel in Franklin, Nebraska is a hotel that was built in 1918. It was listed on the National Register of Historic Places in 1989, but was removed from the Register in 2016.
