= Macon, Nebraska =

Unincorporated community in Nebraska, U.S.

Macon is an unincorporated community in Franklin County, Nebraska, United States. Macon is located at 40°12′18″N 98°57′09″W.

== History ==
A post office was established at Macon in 1873, and remained in operation until it was discontinued in 1955. It was named after Macon, Georgia, the native home of a pioneer settler.
