= Lincoln Hotel (San Diego) =

Historic building in San Diego, California, U.S.

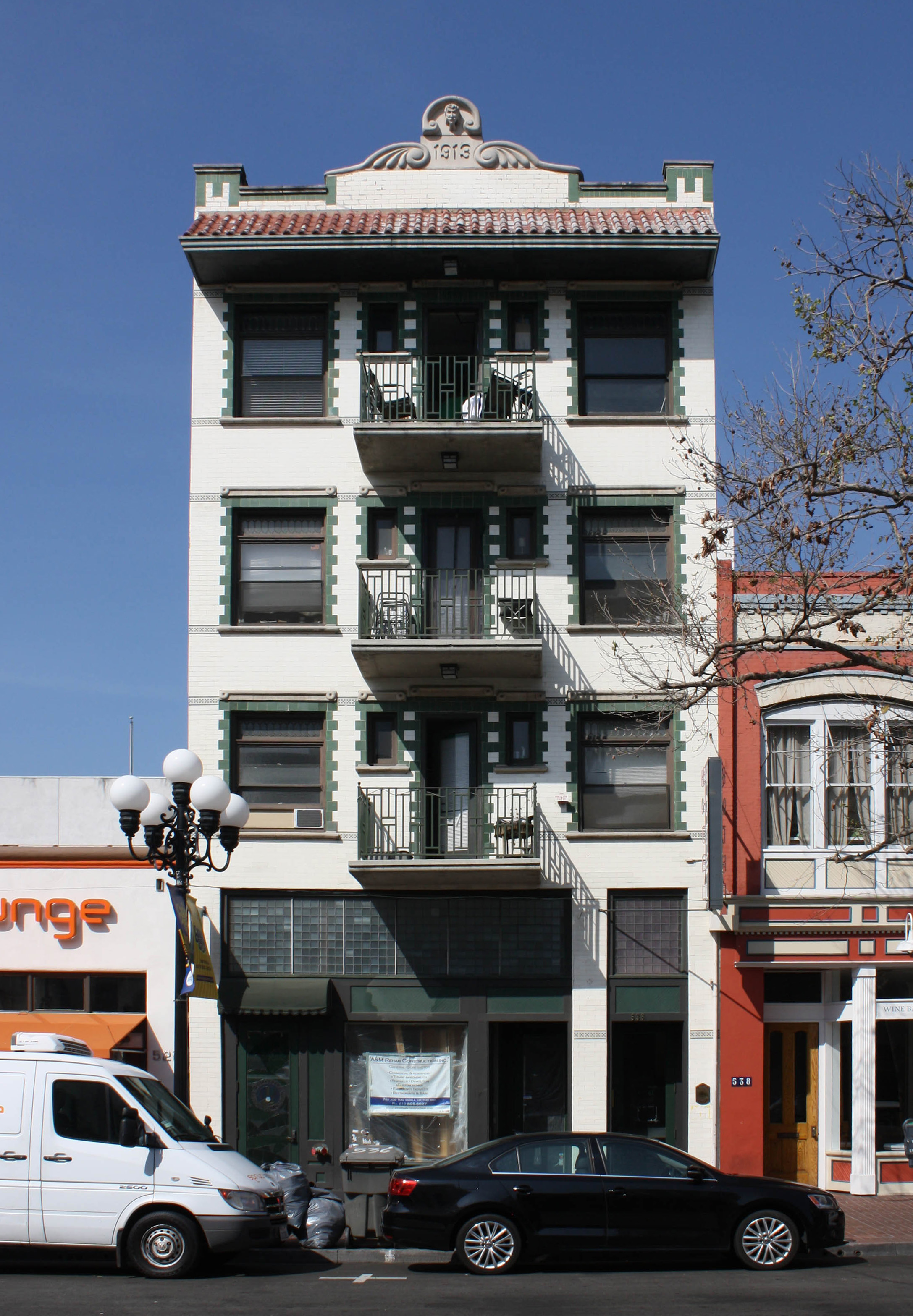
- The building's exterior in 2013
- Interactive map of the Lincoln Hotel area

General information
- Type: Hotel
- Location: 536 5th Avenue, San Diego, United States
- Coordinates: 32°42′39″N 117°09′37″W
- Opened: 1913

The Lincoln Hotel is a historic building located at 536 5th Avenue in the Gaslamp Quarter of San Diego, California. It was built in 1913 and its architectural style is Victorian with elements of Art Nouveau.

The Historical Building Marker inscription (marker number 60) for the Lincoln Hotel reads:

This four-story, steel-framed building features distincitive architectural treatment. Conveyed through a red clay tile roof and decorative white glazed ceramic tile on the facade. It was used initially as a wine business on the first floor with a hotel above. The building features a flat roof with a slightly stepped parapet and concrete pediment cast with the date of construction. A lion's head was originally on the parapet, but fell during a 1986 earthquake, and was quickly taken by passerby.

The marker was placed by Gaslamp Quarter Association, Gaslamp Quarter Historical Foundation, and San Diego Historical Society.

== See also ==
- List of Gaslamp Quarter historic buildings
