= Bloomington, Nebraska =

Village in Franklin County, Nebraska, United States

Bloomington
- Village
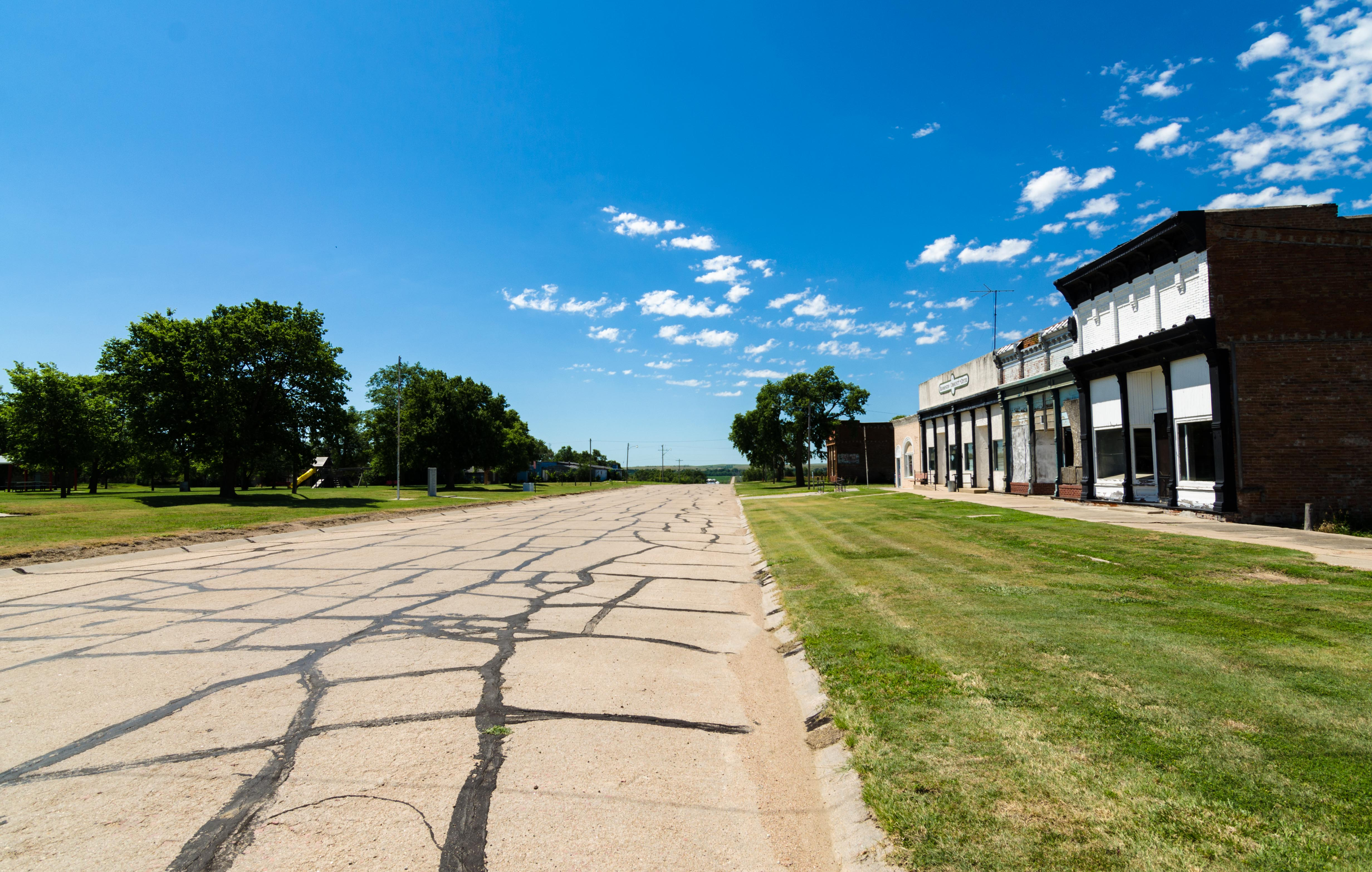

- Location of Bloomington, Nebraska
- Coordinates: 40°05′38″N 99°02′18″W
- Country: United States
- State: Nebraska
- County: Franklin

Area
  - Total: 0.80 sq mi (2.06 km^{2})
  - Land: 0.80 sq mi (2.06 km^{2})
  - Water: 0 sq mi (0.00 km^{2})
- Elevation: 1,946 ft (593 m)

Population (2020)
  - Total: 110
  - Density: 138.2/sq mi (53.35/km^{2})
- Time zone: UTC-6 (Central (CST))
  - Summer (DST): UTC-5 (CDT)
- ZIP code: 68929
- Area code: 308
- FIPS code: 31-05490
- GNIS feature ID: 2398140

Bloomington is a village in Franklin County, Nebraska, United States. As of the 2020 census, Bloomington had a population of 110.

== History ==
Bloomington was established in 1872 when it was certain that the railroad would be extended to that point. It was likely named after the city of Bloomington, Illinois.

It once served as county seat.

== Geography ==
According to the United States Census Bureau, the village has a total area of 0.80 square miles (2.07 km^{2}), all land.

== Demographics ==
Historical population
Census	Pop.	Note	%±
1880	524		—
1890	464		−11.5%
1900	488		5.2%
1910	554		13.5%
1920	503		−9.2%
1930	431		−14.3%
1940	361		−16.2%
1950	293		−18.8%
1960	176		−39.9%
1970	165		−6.2%
1980	138		−16.4%
1990	129		−6.5%
2000	124		−3.9%
2010	103		−16.9%
2020	110		6.8%
U.S. Decennial Census

=== 2010 census ===
As of the census of 2010, there were 103 people, 49 households, and 27 families residing in the village. The population density was 128.8 inhabitants per square mile (49.7/km^{2}). There were 74 housing units at an average density of 92.5 per square mile (35.7/km^{2}). The racial makeup of the village was 97.1% White, 1.0% African American, 1.0% Native American, and 1.0% from two or more races.

There were 49 households, of which 16.3% had children under the age of 18 living with them, 51.0% were married couples living together, 4.1% had a female householder with no husband present, and 44.9% were non-families. 34.7% of all households were made up of individuals, and 18.4% had someone living alone who was 65 years of age or older. The average household size was 2.10 and the average family size was 2.70.

The median age in the village was 51.5 years. 14.6% of residents were under the age of 18; 5.8% were between the ages of 18 and 24; 14.6% were from 25 to 44; 39.8% were from 45 to 64; and 25.2% were 65 years of age or older. The gender makeup of the village was 53.4% male and 46.6% female.

=== 2000 census ===
As of the census of 2000, there were 124 people, 60 households, and 34 families residing in the village. The population density was 155.6 inhabitants per square mile (60.1/km^{2}). There were 80 housing units at an average density of 100.4 per square mile (38.8/km^{2}). The racial makeup of the village was 97.58% White, 0.81% Native American, and 1.61% from two or more races.

There were 60 households, out of which 20.0% had children under the age of 18 living with them, 48.3% were married couples living together, 6.7% had a female householder with no husband present, and 41.7% were non-families. 33.3% of all households were made up of individuals, and 11.7% had someone living alone who was 65 years of age or older. The average household size was 2.07 and the average family size was 2.66.

In the village, the population was spread out, with 18.5% under the age of 18, 5.6% from 18 to 24, 23.4% from 25 to 44, 34.7% from 45 to 64, and 17.7% who were 65 years of age or older. The median age was 46 years. For every 100 females, there were 121.4 males. For every 100 females age 18 and over, there were 114.9 males.

As of 2000 the median income for a household in the village was $15,000, and the median income for a family was $24,250. Males had a median income of $20,208 versus $23,250 for females. The per capita income for the village was $13,334. There were 12.9% of families and 22.0% of the population living below the poverty line, including 30.8% of under eighteens and 19.2% of those over 64.

== Notable person ==
- Kid Willson, baseball player

== See also ==
- List of municipalities in Nebraska
