= Riverton, Nebraska =

Village in Franklin County, Nebraska, United States

- Village
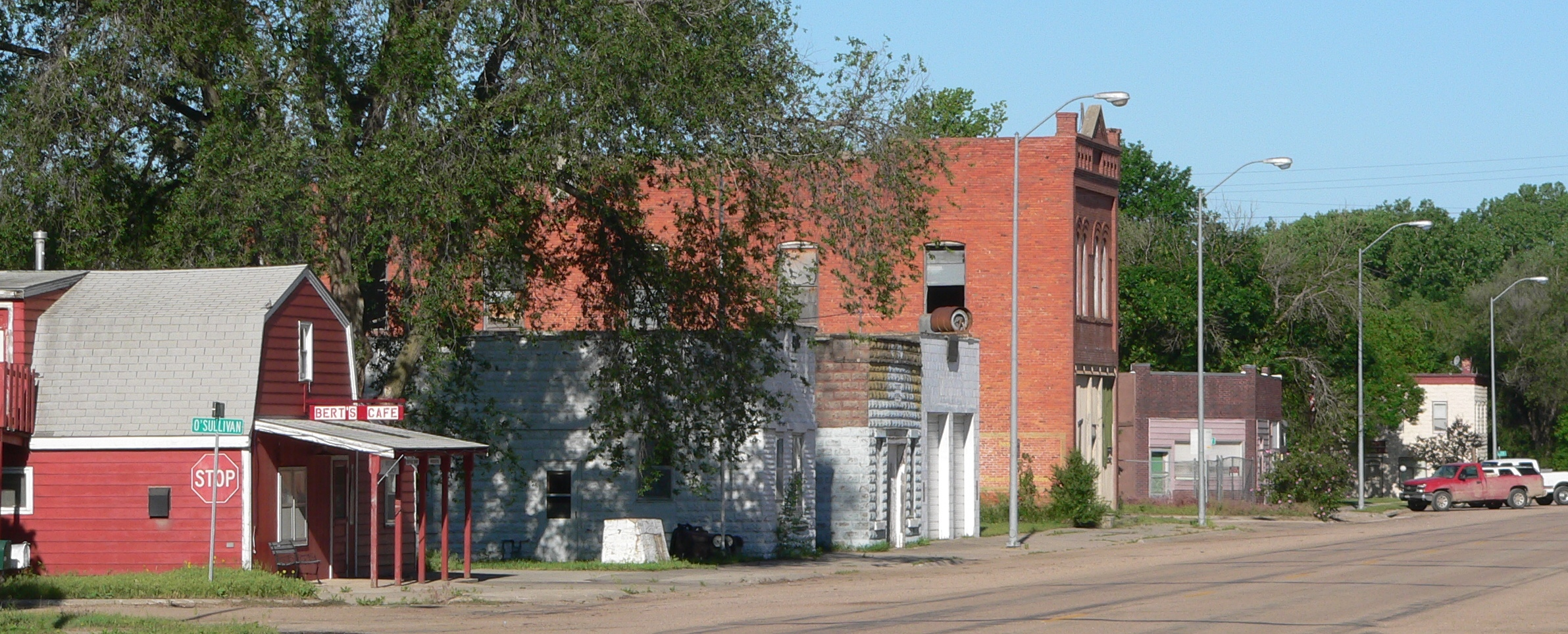
- Downtown Riverton: south side of U.S. Highway 136

- Location of Riverton, Nebraska
- Coordinates: 40°05′23″N 98°45′35″W
- Country: United States
- State: Nebraska
- County: Franklin

Area
  - Total: 0.39 sq mi (1.02 km^{2})
  - Land: 0.39 sq mi (1.02 km^{2})
  - Water: 0 sq mi (0.00 km^{2})
- Elevation: 1,772 ft (540 m)

Population (2020)
  - Total: 57
  - Density: 145.2/sq mi (56.05/km^{2})
- Time zone: UTC-6 (Central (CST))
  - Summer (DST): UTC-5 (CDT)
- ZIP code: 68972
- Area code: 402
- FIPS code: 31-41760
- GNIS feature ID: 2399092

Riverton is a village in Franklin County, Nebraska, United States. As of the 2020 census, Riverton had a population of 57.

== History ==
A post office was established in Riverton in 1871. Riverton was incorporated as a village in 1880.

== Geography ==
According to the United States Census Bureau, the village has a total area of 0.39 square miles (1.01 km^{2}), all land.

== Demographics ==
Historical population
Census	Pop.	Note	%±
1880	426		—
1890	389		−8.7%
1900	327		−15.9%
1910	369		12.8%
1920	399		8.1%
1930	328		−17.8%
1940	390		18.9%
1950	348		−10.8%
1960	303		−12.9%
1970	220		−27.4%
1980	212		−3.6%
1990	162		−23.6%
2000	145		−10.5%
2010	89		−38.6%
2020	57		−36.0%
U.S. Decennial Census

=== 2010 census ===
At the 2010 census there were 89 people, 46 households, and 24 families in the village. The population density was 228.2 inhabitants per square mile (88.1/km^{2}). There were 77 housing units at an average density of 197.4 per square mile (76.2/km^{2}). The racial makup of the village was 96.6% White and 3.4% from two or more races.

Of the 46 households, 13.0% had children under the age of 18 living with them, 34.8% were married couples living together, 15.2% had a female householder with no husband present, 2.2% had a male householder with no wife present, and 47.8% were non-families. 43.5% of households were one person, and 15.2% were one person aged 65 or older. The average household size was 1.93 and the average family size was 2.58.

The median age in the village was 51.8 years. 16.9% of residents were under the age of 18; 4.5% were between the ages of 18 and 24; 17.9% were from 25 to 44; 33.7% were from 45 to 64; and 27% were 65 or older. The gender makeup of the village was 50.6% male and 49.4% female.

=== 2000 census ===
At the 2000 census there were 145 people, 63 households, and 38 families in the village. The population density was 368.8 inhabitants per square mile (142.4/km^{2}). There were 75 housing units at an average density of 190.8 per square mile (73.7/km^{2}). The racial makup of the village was 98.62% White, 0.69% Asian, and 0.69% from two or more races. Hispanic or Latino of any race were 2.07%.

There were 63 households, out of which 25.4% had children under the age of 18 living with them, 47.6% were married couples living together, 6.3% had a female householder with no husband present, and 38.1% were non-families. 34.9% of households were one person, and 25.4% were one person aged 65 or older. The average household size was 2.30 and the average family size was 3.00.

The age distribution was 29.0% under the age of 18, 3.4% from 18 to 24, 20.0% from 25 to 44, 24.1% from 45 to 64, and 23.4% 65 or older. The median age was 42 years. For every 100 females, there were 101.4 males. For every 100 females age 18 and over, there were 106.0 males.

The median household income was $19,750, and the median income for a family was $25,625. Males had a median income of $32,917 versus $16,875 for females. The per capita income for the village was $10,936. There were 16.2% of families and 35.8% of the population living below the poverty line, including 46.4% of under eighteens and 20.8% of those over 64.

== See also ==
- List of municipalities in Nebraska
