= Naponee, Nebraska =

Naponee, Nebraska naapaane
- Village
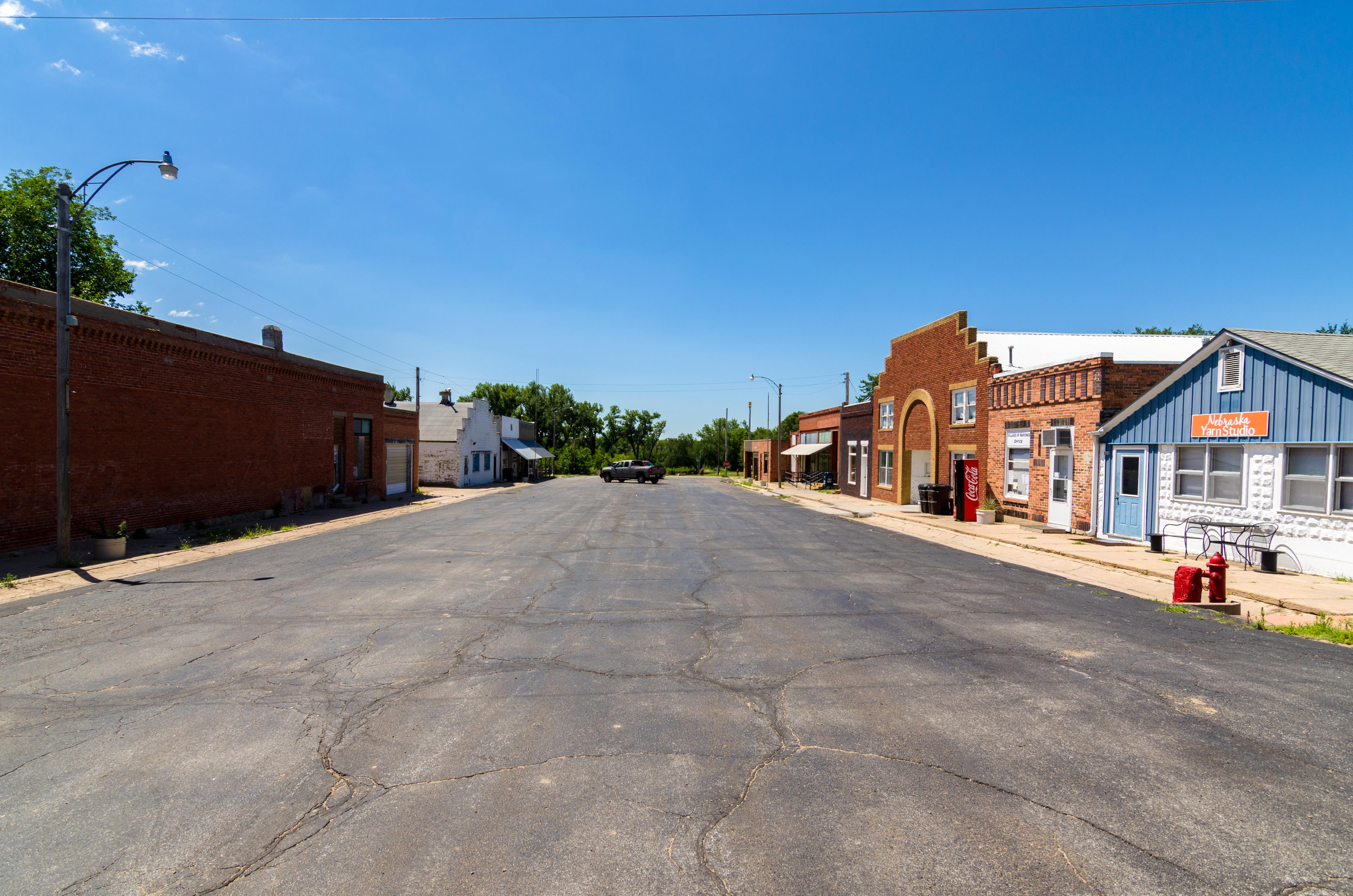

- Location of Naponee, Nebraska
- Coordinates: 40°04′29″N 99°08′19″W
- Country: United States
- State: Nebraska
- County: Franklin

Area
  - Total: 0.23 sq mi (0.60 km^{2})
  - Land: 0.23 sq mi (0.60 km^{2})
  - Water: 0 sq mi (0.00 km^{2})
- Elevation: 1,880 ft (570 m)

Population (2020)
  - Total: 83
  - Density: 360/sq mi (139/km^{2})
- Time zone: UTC-6 (Central (CST))
  - Summer (DST): UTC-5 (CDT)
- ZIP code: 68960
- Area code: 308
- FIPS code: 31-33565
- GNIS feature ID: 2399436

Naponee (Mississauga: naapanne; "flour") is a village in Franklin County, Nebraska, United States. As of the 2020 census, Naponee had a population of 83.

== Geography ==
According to the United States Census Bureau, the village has a total area of 0.23 square miles (0.60 km^{2}), all land.

Naponee is situated near the Republican River, approximately 3 miles (4.8 km) downstream from Harlan County Dam, and about 2 miles (3.2 km) south of U.S. Route 136.

== Demographics ==
Historical population
Census	Pop.	Note	%±
1880	76		—
1910	195		—
1920	263		34.9%
1930	252		−4.2%
1940	272		7.9%
1950	391		43.8%
1960	206		−47.3%
1970	187		−9.2%
1980	160		−14.4%
1990	97		−39.4%
2000	132		36.1%
2010	106		−19.7%
2020	83		−21.7%
U.S. Decennial Census

=== 2010 census ===
As of the census of 2010, there were 106 people, 52 households, and 34 families residing in the village. The population density was 460.9 inhabitants per square mile (178.0/km^{2}). There were 84 housing units at an average density of 365.2 per square mile (141.0/km^{2}). The racial makeup of the village was 96.2% White, 0.9% Asian, and 2.8% from two or more races.

There were 52 households, of which 17.3% had children under the age of 18 living with them, 57.7% were married couples living together, 1.9% had a female householder with no husband present, 5.8% had a male householder with no wife present, and 34.6% were non-families. 32.7% of all households were made up of individuals, and 17.3% had someone living alone who was 65 years of age or older. The average household size was 2.04 and the average family size was 2.50.

The median age in the village was 52 years. 14.2% of residents were under the age of 18; 8.3% were between the ages of 18 and 24; 17% were from 25 to 44; 27.3% were from 45 to 64; and 33% were 65 years of age or older. The gender makeup of the village was 50.9% male and 49.1% female.

=== 2000 census ===
As of the census of 2000, there were 132 people, 55 households, and 40 families residing in the village. The population density was 567.6 inhabitants per square mile (219.2/km^{2}). There were 89 housing units at an average density of 382.7 per square mile (147.8/km^{2}). The racial makeup of the village was 99.24% White, and 0.76% from two or more races. Hispanic or Latino of any race were 0.76% of the population.

There were 55 households, out of which 29.1% had children under the age of 18 living with them, 69.1% were married couples living together, 5.5% had a female householder with no husband present, and 25.5% were non-families. 21.8% of all households were made up of individuals, and 9.1% had someone living alone who was 65 years of age or older. The average household size was 2.40 and the average family size was 2.78.

In the village, the population was spread out, with 22.0% under the age of 18, 6.1% from 18 to 24, 25.8% from 25 to 44, 24.2% from 45 to 64, and 22.0% who were 65 years of age or older. The median age was 42 years. For every 100 females, there were 109.5 males. For every 100 females age 18 and over, there were 98.1 males.

As of 2000 the median income for a household in the village was $29,375, and the median income for a family was $33,250. Males had a median income of $31,563 versus $15,833 for females. The per capita income for the village was $11,866. There were 12.2% of families and 12.3% of the population living below the poverty line, including 12.5% of under eighteens and 6.5% of those over 64.

== History ==
The first settlers to the Naponee area arrived in 1869. Naponee's name originates with Napanee, Ontario, the hometown of a Canadian who fought in the Civil War and bought land along the Republican River. A post office was established in Naponee in 1871. In 1877, the first store opened and was followed by the village's first survey 1879. Railroad service arrived in 1879 with the Burlington Railroad reaching town. Incorporation of the village of Naponee took place on November 30, 1909. Like many places, Naponee suffered in the Great Depression and major dust storms and flooding of the Republican River in 1935 compounded these woes. Construction of the nearby Harlan County Dam in the 1940s nearly doubled the population from 200 to 400. Today Naponee remains a rural community with a stable population.

== Notable person ==
- David Janssen, film and television actor
