= Franklin, Nebraska =

- City
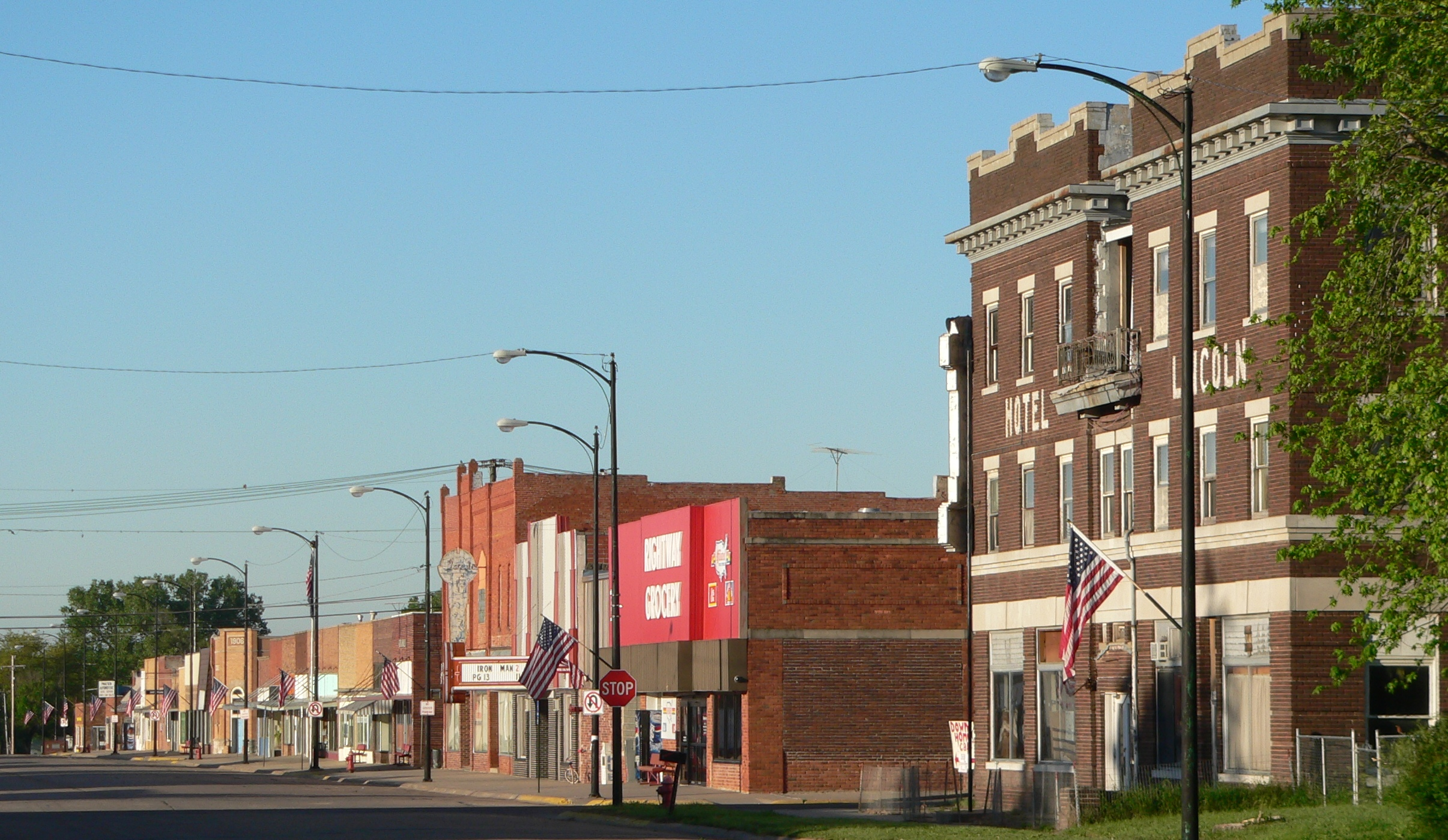
- Downtown Franklin, west side of 15th Ave, looking south from between M and N Streets, 2010

- Location of Franklin, Nebraska
- Coordinates: 40°05′48″N 98°57′05″W
- Country: United States
- State: Nebraska
- County: Franklin

Government
  - Mayor: George R. Kleen

Area
  - Total: 0.99 sq mi (2.57 km^{2})
  - Land: 0.99 sq mi (2.57 km^{2})
  - Water: 0 sq mi (0.00 km^{2})
- Elevation: 1,860 ft (570 m)

Population (2020)
  - Total: 941
  - Density: 948.3/sq mi (366.14/km^{2})
- Time zone: UTC-6 (Central (CST))
  - Summer (DST): UTC-5 (CDT)
- ZIP code: 68939
- Area code: 308
- FIPS code: 31-17530
- GNIS feature ID: 838009
- Website: www.franklinnebraska.com

Franklin is a city in Franklin County, Nebraska, United States. The population was 941 at the 2020 census. It is the county seat of Franklin County.

== History ==
Franklin was founded in the 1870s. It was named for Benjamin Franklin.

Former Nebraska Governor, Ashton Shallenberger, collapsed and then died a few moments later while giving a speech in Franklin on February 22, 1938.

== Geography ==
According to the United States Census Bureau, the city has a total area of 0.99 square miles (2.56 km^{2}), all land.

=== Climate ===
Franklin has a humid continental climate (Köppen Dfa bordering on Dwa).

Climate data for Franklin, NE (1991-2020 normals, extremes 1990-2023, coordinates:40.0953°N 98.9450°W)
Month	Jan	Feb	Mar	Apr	May	Jun	Jul	Aug	Sep	Oct	Nov	Dec	Year
Record high °F (°C)	73 (23)	79 (26)	91 (33)	95 (35)	101 (38)	114 (46)	111 (44)	108 (42)	113 (45)	96 (36)	87 (31)	78 (26)	114 (46)
Mean maximum °F (°C)	62 (17)	69 (21)	79 (26)	86 (30)	92 (33)	98 (37)	102 (39)	99 (37)	95 (35)	89 (32)	75 (24)	64 (18)	102 (39)
Mean daily maximum °F (°C)	38.3 (3.5)	42.5 (5.8)	54.0 (12.2)	63.7 (17.6)	73.3 (22.9)	84.2 (29.0)	89.2 (31.8)	86.8 (30.4)	79.8 (26.6)	66.7 (19.3)	52.6 (11.4)	40.6 (4.8)	64.3 (17.9)
Daily mean °F (°C)	26.1 (−3.3)	29.7 (−1.3)	40.1 (4.5)	49.9 (9.9)	60.6 (15.9)	71.6 (22.0)	76.7 (24.8)	74.2 (23.4)	65.7 (18.7)	52.3 (11.3)	39.0 (3.9)	28.6 (−1.9)	51.2 (10.7)
Mean daily minimum °F (°C)	13.9 (−10.1)	16.8 (−8.4)	26.3 (−3.2)	36.1 (2.3)	47.9 (8.8)	58.9 (14.9)	64.1 (17.8)	61.6 (16.4)	51.7 (10.9)	38.0 (3.3)	25.3 (−3.7)	16.5 (−8.6)	38.1 (3.4)
Mean minimum °F (°C)	−5 (−21)	−1 (−18)	9 (−13)	21 (−6)	34 (1)	46 (8)	54 (12)	51 (11)	37 (3)	21 (−6)	9 (−13)	0 (−18)	−5 (−21)
Record low °F (°C)	−16 (−27)	−28 (−33)	−10 (−23)	8 (−13)	25 (−4)	34 (1)	46 (8)	43 (6)	24 (−4)	−2 (−19)	−5 (−21)	−16 (−27)	−28 (−33)
Average precipitation inches (mm)	0.56 (14)	0.79 (20)	1.44 (37)	2.54 (65)	4.39 (112)	3.88 (99)	3.94 (100)	3.16 (80)	1.81 (46)	2.11 (54)	1.05 (27)	0.87 (22)	26.54 (676)
Average snowfall inches (cm)	4.2 (11)	6.0 (15)	2.3 (5.8)	1.0 (2.5)	0.0 (0.0)	0.0 (0.0)	0.0 (0.0)	0.0 (0.0)	0.0 (0.0)	1.0 (2.5)	1.6 (4.1)	2.8 (7.1)	18.9 (48)
Average extreme snow depth inches (cm)	3 (7.6)	4 (10)	2 (5.1)	1 (2.5)	0 (0)	0 (0)	0 (0)	0 (0)	0 (0)	1 (2.5)	1 (2.5)	2 (5.1)	4 (10)
Average precipitation days (≥ 0.01 in)	4.1	4.3	6.4	8.4	10.4	9.4	9.4	8.3	5.9	6.4	4.7	4.3	82
Average snowy days (≥ 0.01 in)	2.7	2.7	1.3	0.4	0	0	0	0	0	0.2	1	2.4	10.7
Source: NOAA

== Demographics ==
Historical population
Census	Pop.	Note	%±
1880	78		—
1890	556		612.8%
1900	756		36.0%
1910	949		25.5%
1920	1,055		11.2%
1930	1,103		4.5%
1940	1,272		15.3%
1950	1,602		25.9%
1960	1,194		−25.5%
1970	1,193		−0.1%
1980	1,167		−2.2%
1990	1,112		−4.7%
2000	1,026		−7.7%
2010	1,000		−2.5%
2020	941		−5.9%
U.S. Decennial Census

=== 2010 census ===
As of the census of 2010, there were 1,000 people, 443 households, and 264 families living in the city. The population density was 1,010.1 inhabitants per square mile (390.0/km^{2}). There were 519 housing units at an average density of 524.2 per square mile (202.4/km^{2}). The racial makeup of the city was 98.4% White, 0.4% Native American, 0.1% Asian, 0.4% from other races, and 0.7% from two or more races. Hispanic or Latino of any race were 1.5% of the population.

There were 443 households, of which 25.1% had children under the age of 18 living with them, 48.8% were married couples living together, 8.4% had a female householder with no husband present, 2.5% had a male householder with no wife present, and 40.4% were non-families. 37.9% of all households were made up of individuals, and 25.5% had someone living alone who was 65 years of age or older. The average household size was 2.19 and the average family size was 2.89.

The median age in the city was 48.5 years. 23.4% of residents were under the age of 18; 5.1% were between the ages of 18 and 24; 17.4% were from 25 to 44; 26.6% were from 45 to 64; and 27.5% were 65 years of age or older. The gender makeup of the city was 45.8% male and 54.2% female.

=== 2000 census ===
As of the census of 2000, there were 1,026 people, 440 households, and 272 families living in the city. The population density was 1,028.4 inhabitants per square mile (397.1/km^{2}). There were 498 housing units at an average density of 499.2 per square mile (192.7/km^{2}). The racial makeup of the city was 99.42% White, 0.39% Native American, 0.10% Asian, and 0.10% from two or more races. Hispanic or Latino of any race were 0.97% of the population.

There were 440 households, out of which 25.2% had children under the age of 18 living with them, 51.4% were married couples living together, 8.4% had a female householder with no husband present, and 38.0% were non-families. 36.8% of all households were made up of individuals, and 24.3% had someone living alone who was 65 years of age or older. The average household size was 2.18 and the average family size was 2.85.

Age spread: 22.8% under the age of 18, 4.1% from 18 to 24, 20.3% from 25 to 44, 20.1% from 45 to 64, and 32.7% who were 65 years of age or older. The median age was 48 years. For every 100 females, there were 76.3 males. For every 100 females age 18 and over, there were 73.3 males.

As of 2000 the median income for a household in the city was $27,315, and the median income for a family was $32,639. Males had a median income of $25,156 versus $16,739 for females. The per capita income for the city was $15,181. About 7.8% of families and 10.8% of the population were below the poverty line, including 13.7% of those under age 18 and 8.4% of those age 65 or over.

== Notable people ==
- Frank W. Cyr, an educator known as "Father of the Yellow School Bus", was born in Franklin.
- Archie E. Mitchell - Christian missionary
- Clarence Mitchell - Major League Baseball pitcher
