= Rose Hill =

Rose Hill may refer to:

== People ==
- Rose Hill (actress) (1914–2003), British actress
- Rose Hill (athlete) (born 1956), British wheelchair athlete

== Film ==
- Rose Hill (film), a 1997 movie

== Places ==
=== Australia ===
- Rose Hill, New South Wales
- Rose Hill, Queensland, on Thursday Island

=== Bermuda ===
- Rose Hill, Bermuda, the former location of Admiralty House

=== Canada ===
- Rose Hill, Ontario, a community in Addington Highlands
- Rose Hill, Kamloops, a neighbourhood in Kamloops

=== Hungary ===
- Rose Hill, Budapest, the Rózsadomb district of Budapest

=== Mauritius ===
- Beau Bassin-Rose Hill, a large commercial town

=== United Kingdom ===
- Rose Hill, Buckinghamshire, a community in Burnham
- Rose Hill, Derby, an inner city suburb
- Rose Hill, the former name of Brightling Park, East Sussex
- Rose Hill, Lancashire, an area of Burnley
- Rose Hill Marple railway station, Stockport, Greater Manchester
- Rose Hill, Oxfordshire, a city council estate near Oxford
- Rose Hill, Suffolk, an area of Ipswich

=== United States ===
- Rose Hill, Alabama
- Rose Hill, Illinois
- Rose Hill, Indiana, an extinct community
- Rose Hill, Iowa
- Rose Hill, Kansas
- Rose Hill, Jasper County, Mississippi
- Rose Hill, Warren County, Mississippi
- Rose Hill, Missouri
- Rose Hill, Manhattan, a neighborhood in New York City
- Rose Hill, New York
- Rose Hill, North Carolina
- Rose Hill, Ohio
- Rose Hill, Garland, Texas, an area annexed by Garland in 1970
- Rose Hill, Harris County, Texas, an unincorporated area
- Rose Hill, San Jacinto County, Texas, an unincorporated community
- Rose Hill, Albemarle County, Virginia, an unincorporated community
- Rose Hill, Fairfax County, Virginia, a census-designated place
- Rose Hill, Lee County, Virginia, a census-designated place
- Rose Hill, Rappahannock County, Virginia, an unincorporated community

== Buildings ==
=== United Kingdom ===
- Rose Hill, Northenden, a 19th-century Victorian villa in Manchester, England
- Churchills, Bolton, a pub in Greater Manchester, England, formerly called "Rose Hill"

=== United States ===
- Rose Hill (Milledgeville, Georgia), a National Register of Historic Places (NRHP)-listed house and the home of Lockerly Arboretum in Milledgeville, Georgia
- Rose Hill station, a former commuter railroad station on the present-day Union Pacific North Line in Chicago, Illinois
- Rose Hill (Iowa City, Iowa), a NRHP-listed in Johnson County, Iowa
- Rose Hill (Lexington, Kentucky), NRHP-listed in Fayette County, Kentucky
- Rose Hill (Louisville, Kentucky), NRHP-listed in Kentucky
- Rose Hill (Chestertown, Maryland), NRHP-listed in Kent County, Maryland
- Rose Hill (Earleville, Maryland), NRHP-listed in Cecil County, Maryland
- Rose Hill (Port Tobacco, Maryland), NRHP-listed in Charles County, Maryland
- Rose Hill (Williamsport, Maryland), NRHP-listed in Washington County, Maryland
- Rose Hill Manor, NRHP-listed in Frederick County, Maryland
- Rose Hill Mansion, NRHP-listed in Fayette, New York
- Rose Hill (Guilderland, New York), NRHP-listed in Albany County, New York
- Rose Hill, an estate and Tuscan-style villa in Tivoli, New York
- Rose Hill (Grassy Creek, North Carolina), NRHP-listed in Granville County, North Carolina
- Rose Hill (Locust Hill, North Carolina), NRHP-listed in Caswell County, North Carolina
- Rose Hill (Louisburg, North Carolina), NRHP-listed in Franklin County, North Carolina
- Rose Hill (Nashville, North Carolina), NRHP-listed in Nash County, North Carolina
- Rose Hill and Community House, Bay Village, NRHP-listed in Cuyahoga County, Ohio
- Rose Hill (Union, South Carolina), NRHP-listed in Union County, South Carolina
- Rose Hill Plantation House, NRHP-listed in Bluffton, South Carolina
- Rose Hill (Port Arthur, Texas), NRHP-listed in Jefferson County, Texas
- Rose Hill (Capron, Virginia), NRHP-listed in Southampton County, Virginia
- Rose Hill (Front Royal, Virginia), NRHP-listed in Warren County, Virginia
- Phelps House (Aiken, South Carolina), also called Rose Hill Estate, NRHP-listed in Aiken County, South Carolina

== See also ==
- Rose Hill Cemetery (disambiguation)
- Rose Hill Farm (disambiguation)
- Rose Hill Historic District (disambiguation)
- Rose Hill Methodist Episcopal Church, Rose Hill, Iowa
- Rose Hill Plantation (disambiguation)
- Rose Hill Township (disambiguation)
- Rose Hills (disambiguation)
- Rosehill (disambiguation)
- Fordham University at Rose Hill, Bronx, New York, the largest of Fordham University's three campuses
