= Rose Hill Plantation =

Rose Hill Plantation may refer to:

- Rose Hill Plantation in Leon County, Florida
- Rose Hill Manor in Frederick, Maryland
- Rose Hill Plantation in Port Tobacco, Maryland
- Rose Hill Plantation in Caswell County, North Carolina
- Rose Hill Plantation in Granville County, North Carolina
- Rose Hill Plantation in Louisburg, North Carolina
- Rose Hill Plantation in Nashville, North Carolina
- Rose Hill Plantation House in Bluffton, South Carolina
- Rose Hill Plantation State Historic Site in Union County, South Carolina
- Rose Hill Plantation in Fairfax County, Virginia
