= 1953 Vicksburg tornado =

1953 F5 tornado affecting Mississippi

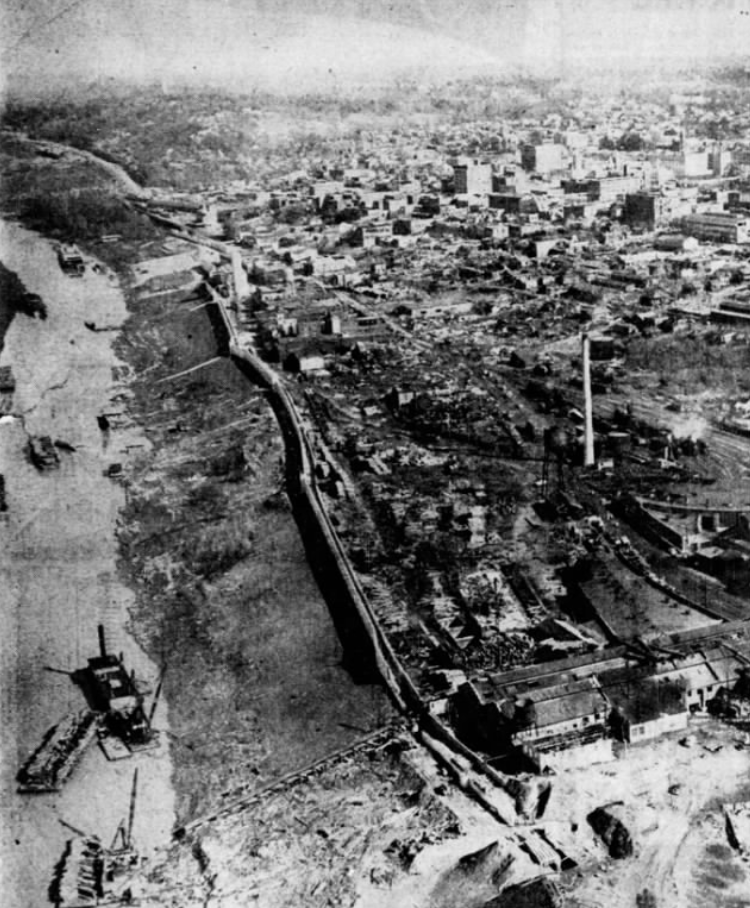
- An aerial view of Vicksburg 2 days after the tornado

Meteorological history
- Formed: December 5, 1953, 5:31 p.m. CST (UTC−06:00)
- Dissipated: December 5, 1953, 5:40 p.m. CST (UTC−06:00)
- Duration: 9 minutes

F5 tornado
- on the Fujita scale
- Highest winds: 265 mph (426 km/h)

Overall effects
- Fatalities: 38
- Injuries: 270
- Damage: $25 million (1953 USD) $248 million (2025 USD)
- Areas affected: Warren County in Mississippi, principally in and near Vicksburg and Waltersville
- Part of the Tornado outbreak sequence of December 1–6, 1953 and tornado outbreaks of 1953

During the afternoon hours of December 5, 1953, a violent and deadly tornado struck the city of Vicksburg, located in the state of Mississippi, causing catastrophic damage to the downtown and residential areas on the north side. The tornado was part of a larger tornado outbreak sequence which primarily affected the Deep South. The tornado tracked 7 miles (11 km) through Madison Parish, LA and Warren County, MS, killing 38 people and injuring a further 270, and cause $25 million (1953 USD) in damages. The tornado is commonly referred as the Vicksburg tornado.

The exact location of where the tornado touched down is unknown, however storm reports indicated the tornado first touched down in Madison Parish near Delta, LA. The tornado crossed the Mississippi River and intensified as it struck Vicksburg from the southwest. The tornado tore through industrial areas on the southwest before going through downtown. Multiple hotels, banks, and even a movie theater sustained major damage, while multiple other businesses were leveled, or sustained heavy damage. The tornado then impact residential areas on the north side of the city, leveling countless homes, with multiple nearby neighborhoods sustaining heavy damage. The tornado then crossed through western sections of Vicksburg National Military Park, heavily damaging more residential buildings. The tornado then entered the community of Waltersville, damaging or destroying several more homes and a church, killing an additional person. The tornado entered heavily rural areas to the north before dissipating shortly after.

== Background & Meteorological Synopsis ==
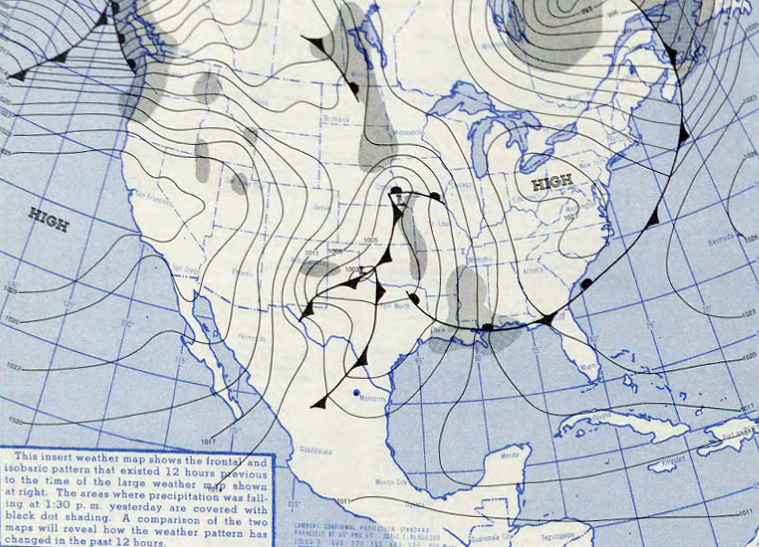
A surface map showing the meteorological conditions on December 5, 1953 around noon (Credit: NWS Jackson)

The tornado was part of a larger tornado outbreak sequence which lasted from December 1 - 6. The outbreak sequence also included multiple strong tornadoes in Texas, Arkansas, Louisiana, and Mississippi, including an F4 which affected areas in and around Alexandria, LA. The Early December tornado outbreak was the last significant tornado outbreak of the 1953 tornado season, which included 4 other F5 tornadoes.

On December 5, 1953, as a warm front retreated northward across Mississippi, temperatures in the warm sector rose steadily. By sunrise, temperatures were already in the low 50s °F—ten to fifteen degrees above average–despite overcast conditions. Just before noon CST (18:00 UTC), southeasterly winds were measured at 17 mph (27 km/h) in Vicksburg. Some hours later, the local dew point rose to nearly 70 °F (21 °C), along with a temperature of 72 °F (22 °C). Meanwhile, favorable wind shear arrived to promote the growth of severe thunderstorms, along with the conditions necessary for tornadogenesis. At 1:30 p.m. CST (19:30 UTC), the Severe Local Storms Unit of the United States Weather Bureau in Washington, D.C., released a severe weather bulletin indicating the likelihood of tornado-producing storms over portions of East Texas, southern Arkansas, northern Louisiana, and western Mississippi.

== Tornado Summary ==
=== Beginning ===
At around 5:30 PM CDT, a high precipitation supercell moving northeastward produced the Vicksburg tornado in eastern Madison Parish, Louisiana, just west of the Mississippi River. The exact location of touchdown is unknown due to the rural nature of the area, however storm reports indicated damage in eastern Madison Parish near Delta, LA. The tornado crossed the Mississippi River and downed several trees on De Soto Island, crossing the Yazoo Diversion Canal shortly after. In the canal, A fisherman was killed by the tornado when it struck his boat, the boat was later found near Port Gibson, but his body was never recovered. The tornado then crossed the border into Mississippi, rapidly intensifying as it entered the industrial areas on the south side of Vicksburg. The tornado caused significant damage to multiple industrial businesses along the Vicksburg railroad, such as the Union Compress and Warehouse Company, the Valley Gin, the Levee Street Foundry and Machine Works, the Vicksburg Transfer Company, and the P.P. Williams Company. The tornado then continued to the northeast, destroying shacks along Pearl Street, Veto Street, and Mulberry Street.

=== Downtown ===
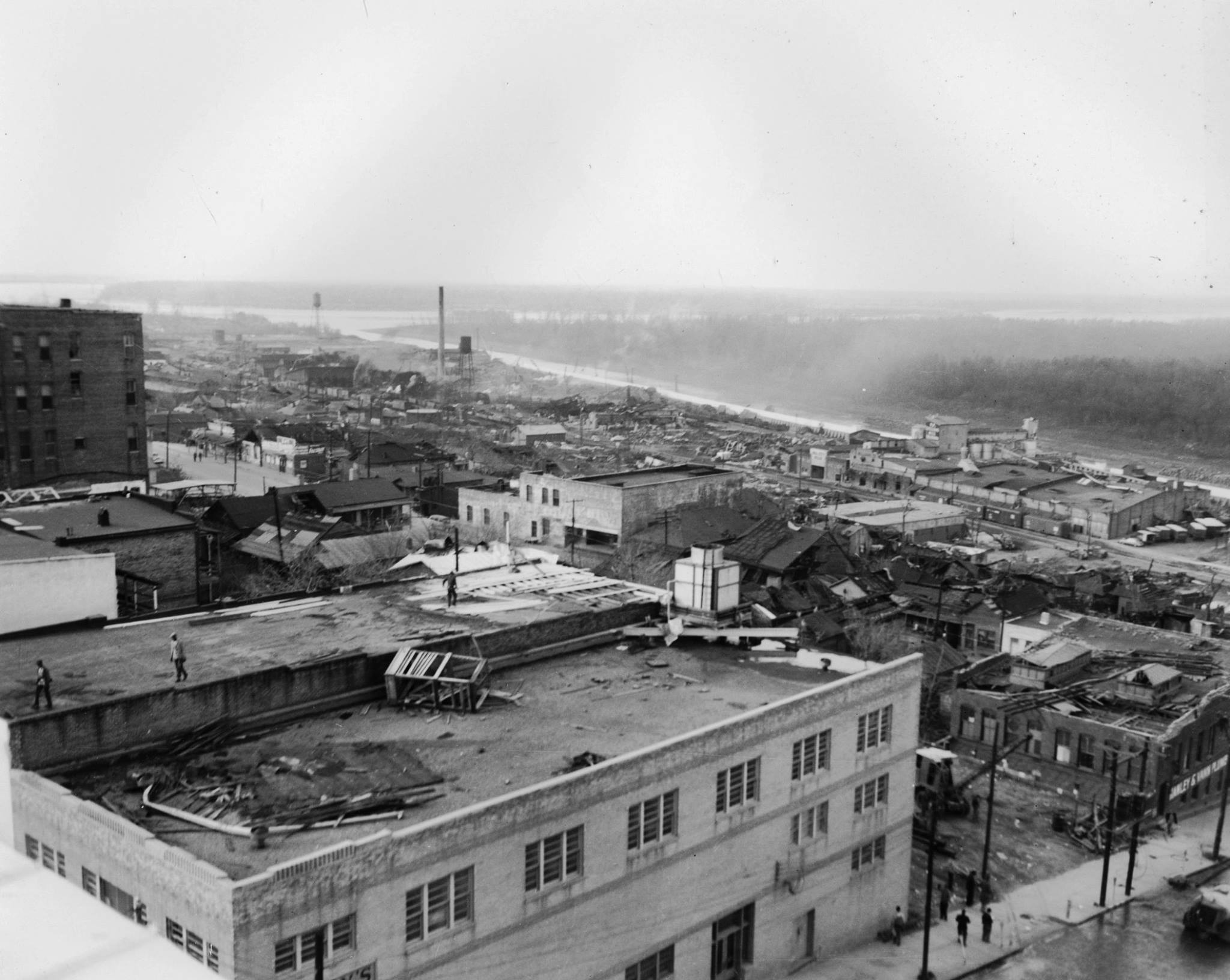
Damage to areas of downtown Vicksburg, looking south (Credit: NWS Jackson)

The tornado directly struck the central business district of Vicksburg at peak intensity. Residents reported that the tornado wasn't heard or seen until moments before it arrived, with many attempting to run back into buildings or basements. One eyewitness reported that the Farmer's Tractor Supply Company "just exploded right in front of my face", as the tornado moved across South Street, killing the owner. Businesses along Washington Street were heavily damaged, with 2 buildings suffering complete collapse. The owner of Ben Warren's Clothing Store, along with his daughter were killed when the store collapsed. As the tornado crossed Crawford Street, multiple more businesses, including Palermo's Mens Shop, were also heavily damaged. 2 fatalities would occur at Palermo's, one customer, and the owner's son. A block to the east, the tornado damaged St. Paul Catholic Church. Even though the historic building was not leveled by the tornado, the structure was so heavily damaged it had to be torn down and rebuilt. As the tornado crossed Clay Street, the First National Bank, the Jefferson Davis Hotel, and Hotel Vicksburg would take significant damage. The Strand Theatre would have some of its walls, and its roof collapse.

The tornado then directly struck the Saenger Theatre, where the worst tragedy would happen. Stephanie Mitchell was celebrating her 10th birthday at the theater with family and friends, where they were watching Botany Bay when the tornado hit. The power to the theater cut out, then moments later, a wall and the ceiling of the theater would collapse, bringing the movie screen down with it. Several people were trapped under their seats, with debris keeping them stuck for several hours, killing five children. The tornado crossed China Street, destroying the Keith Williams Chrysler-Plymouth dealership, then crossed Grove Street, where another fatality occurred. The tornado then damaged the Old Courthouse on Cherry Street before striking the Happyland Nursery, where two toddlers were killed. At around this time, a potential satellite tornado formed two blocks to the east of the main tornado, where it would damage the Joe Wing Sing grocery store on the corner of Openwood Street and Farmer Street. Several fires would break out in downtown due to the catastrophic damage.

=== Northern Vicksburg and Waltersville ===
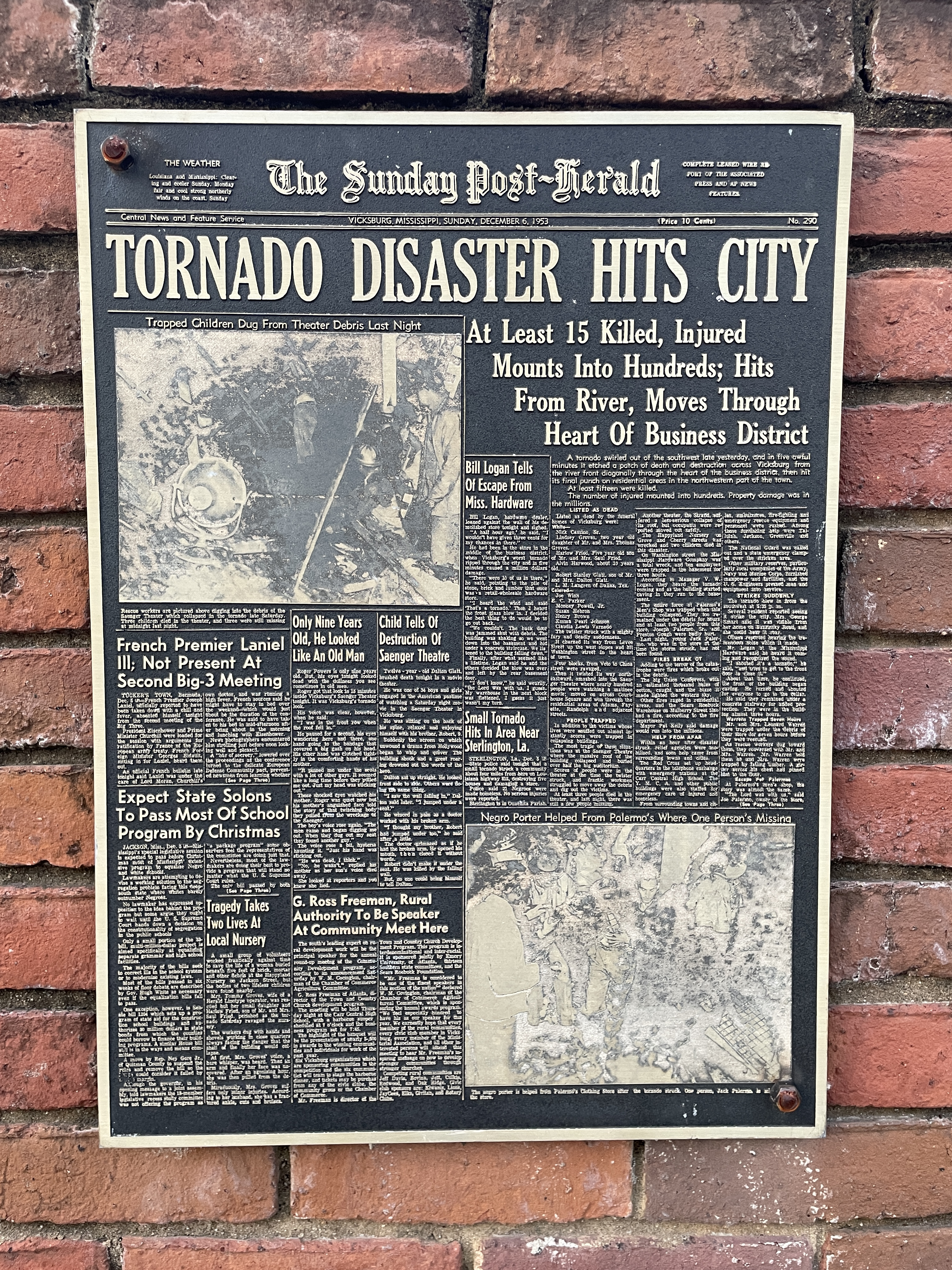
Plaque in Downtown Vicksburg of the Sunday Post-Herald covering the 1953 tornado.

Then, the tornado struck residential areas north of downtown at F4 intensity. Entire neighborhoods along Adams Street, Randolph Street, Fayette Street, Jefferson Street, Locust Street, and other areas around them were completely leveled by winds in excess of 200 miles per hour. At least three deaths would occur in this area. The tornado would then enter western sections of the Vicksburg National Military Park, destroying homes along Confederate Avenue. The Forest Hill observation tower to the east collapsed as well as residences along Union Avenue. The tornado would soon afterwards leave the limits of Vicksburg, and move into the community of Waltersville to the north. 17 homes and a church along Sherman Avenue would be destroyed. The tornado would take its final life in Waltersville before leaving the community to rural areas northward, dissipating shortly after in wooded areas.

== Aftermath ==
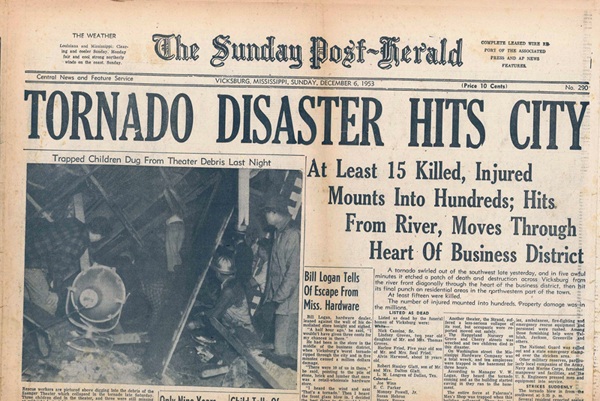
The Vicksburg Evening Post following the tornado. (Credit: NWS Jackson)

The tornado left downtown Vicksburg in ruins, having damaged or destroying 937 buildings. 38 people were killed, 270 received varying injuries, 1,300 people were left homeless, and $25 million (1953 USD) in damages was caused by the tornado. At the time, the Vicksburg tornado was the deadliest tornado to occur during the month of December. As of August 2025, it has only been surpassed by the 2021 Western Kentucky tornado, which claimed 58 lives.

After the tornado passed through Vicksburg, wind gusts and showers hampered recovery efforts, along with a cold front which caused temperatures to drop to the upper 40s by Sunday morning. Temperatures would drop even further on Monday to the middle 30s. The tornado broke the city's gas line, which remained out of service after repairs. Word of the tornado was also slow to get out, as at the time there weren't many news outlets, and those that were around had their utilities disrupted by the tornado. Even the Jackson Weather Bureau only received word of the tornado 20 - 30 minutes after it occurred. The lack of communication infrastructure after the tornado prompted reporters from the Vicksburg Evening Post to walk around downtown, to police stations, and hospitals to gather info on the situation. Despite the lack of power, employees were able to publish the Sunday morning print successfully, using candles to see, charcoal to fire press plates to print paper, and rainwater to develop film. For their efforts, the paper was rewarded with a Pulitzer prize in May 1954.

The tornado also disproved a persistent myth that its proximity to a river protected Vicksburg from tornadoes, which many residents of Vicksburg falsely believed.

=== Rating Controversy ===
The Vicksburg tornado was officially rated as an F5 on the Fujita scale, the highest rating. However, tornado expert Thomas Grazulis gave the tornado a lower F4 rating, saying that the tornado destroyed "very frail" homes. Grazulis later stated that "The student who did the 1950-74 MS ratings for NSSFC hitch-hiked back from Jackson to wherever and left all his rating sheets and notes in that car.;had to redo them all from memory." noting that Mississippi's original rating sheet had not been found. Grazulis stated that he found the original rating sheet for Mississippi, noting that the Vicksburg Tornado was rated as F4, implying that the Vicksburg tornado was meant to be rated as F4, and not F5.

=== Memorials ===
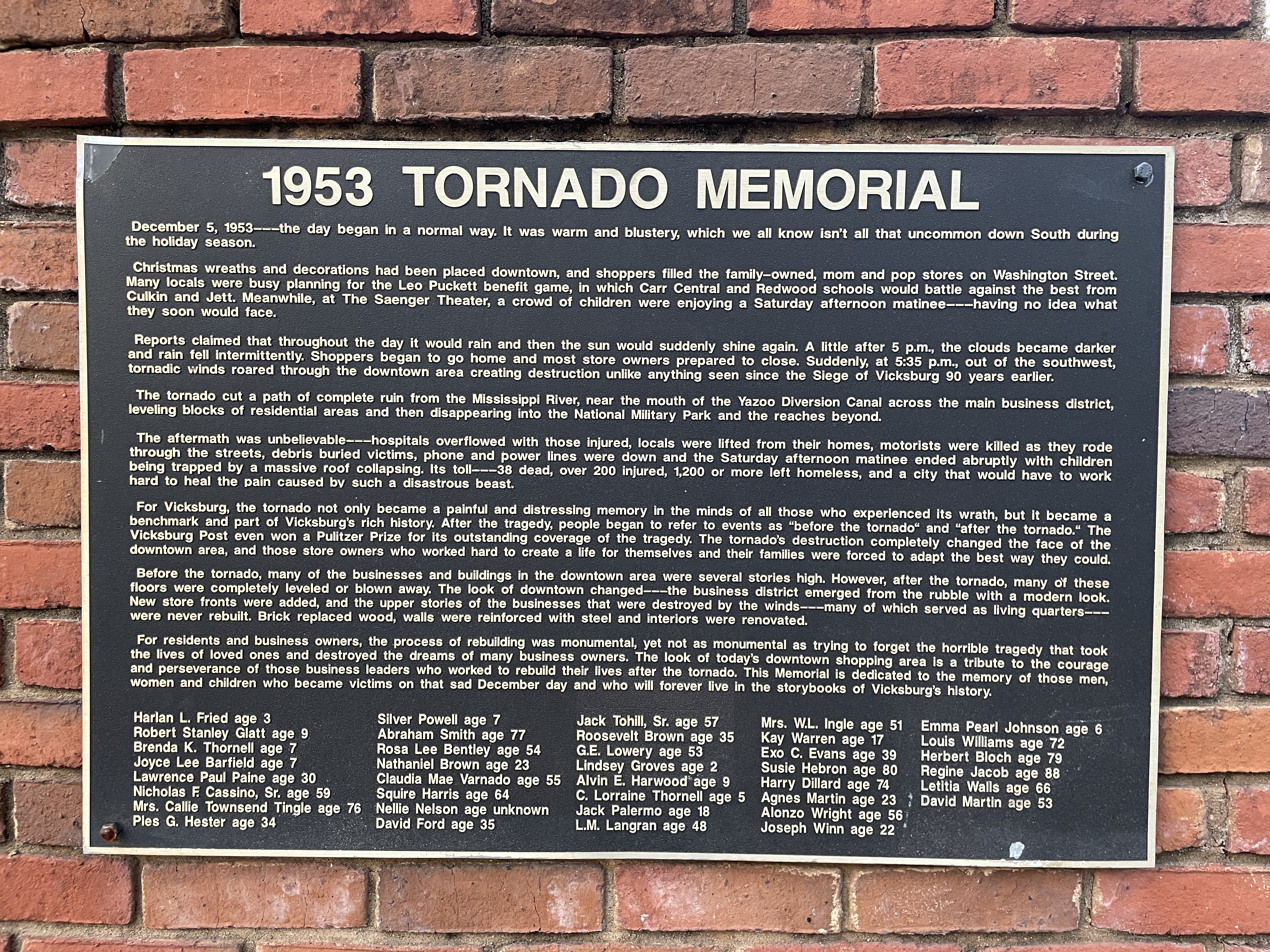
River Plaza 1953 Tornado Memorial plaque.

On the 50th anniversary of the tornado in 2003, the Vicksburg-Warren Chamber of Commerce's Leadership Vicksburg class dedicated two plaques at the River City Plaza at the corner of Washington Street and Crawford Street in downtown Vicksburg. One plaque commemorates the tornado, and the other displays a copy of the December 6 edition of Vicksburg's Sunday Post-Herald published in the immediate aftermath of the storm.

== See also ==
- 1966 Candlestick Park tornado outbreak – A small, but significant outbreak that produced a powerful F5 tornado that devastated portions of Jackson, Mississippi
- 1971 Inverness tornado – An F5 tornado that would strike areas just northwest of Vicksburg, Mississippi in 1971
- 2011 Philadelphia, Mississippi tornado – First of two EF5 tornadoes in Mississippi during the 2011 Super Outbreak
- Smithville tornado – Second of two EF5 tornadoes in Mississippi during the 2011 Super Outbreak
- List of F5 and EF5 tornadoes
- Lists of tornadoes and tornado outbreaks
  - List of North American tornadoes and tornado outbreaks
