= Tornado outbreak sequence of December 1–6, 1953 =

Weather event affecting Southeastern United States

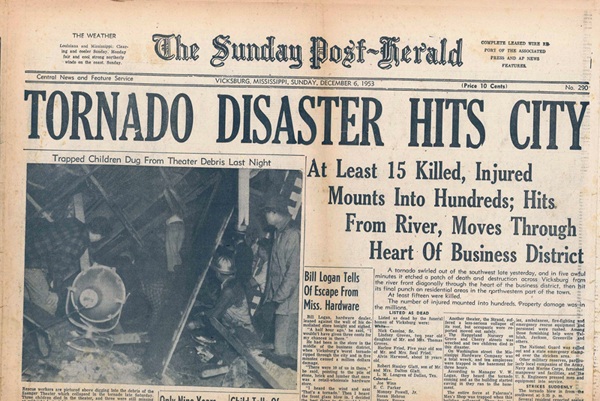
- Vicksburg Sunday Post-Herald showing the destruction in Vicksburg

Meteorological history
- Formed: December 1, 1953
- Dissipated: December 6, 1953

Tornado outbreak
- Tornadoes: 19
- Max. rating: F5 tornado
- Duration: 5 days, 16 hours
- Lowest temp: 31 °F (−1 °C); Vicksburg, MS on December 6.

Overall effects
- Fatalities: 49
- Injuries: 404
- Damage: $45.709 million (1953 USD) $454 million (2025 USD)
- Areas affected: Southeastern United States
- Part of the tornado outbreaks of 1953

The first six days of December 1953 produced a destructive and deadly tornado outbreak sequence (Note: An outbreak is generally defined as a group of at least six tornadoes (the number sometimes varies slightly according to local climatology) with no more than a six-hour gap between individual tornadoes. An outbreak sequence, prior to (after) the start of modern records in 1950, is defined as a period of no more than two (one) consecutive days without at least one significant (F2 or stronger) tornado.) across the Southern United States. There were 19 confirmed tornadoes, including a large and violent F4 tornado that hit the northwest side of Alexandria, Louisiana and a large and violent F5 tornado that hit Vicksburg, Mississippi. In all, the tornadoes killed 49 people, injured 404 others, and caused $45,709 million (1953 USD) in damage. The death toll made this deadliest December tornado outbreak ever recorded and it would not be surpassed until 2021. This was also the last of the series of deadly and catastrophic tornado outbreaks to strike the US in 1953.

== Background ==
1953 had already been an extremely deadly tornado season due to multiple outbreaks that affected a vast majority of the country in the Spring and Early-Summer. In particular, tornadoes in Waco, Texas, Flint, Michigan, and Worcester, Massachusetts had taken 324 lives and injured thousands more. Tornado activity had slowed down heading into July, however, with no fatal tornadoes having occurred from July to November. Climatologically, however, the Southeast can routinely provide favorable conditions for tornado outbreaks in the Winter months and on December 1, 1953, a mile-wide F3 tornado southeast of Seguin, Texas kicked off six straight days of active and deadly tornado activity.

== Meteorological synopsis ==
At least three low-pressure systems formed and moved northward over the Great Plains. Adequate moisture and wind shear on the warm side of the system allowed for repeated rounds of severe and tornadic supercells and squall lines over a six-day period. The outbreak ended as a surface anti-cyclone pushed through the region.

== Confirmed tornadoes ==
Confirmed tornadoes by Fujita rating
FU	F0	F1	F2	F3	F4	F5	Total
0	0	4	10	3	1	1	19

Daily statistics of tornadoes produced by the tornado outbreak sequence of Early-December 1953
Date	Total	Fujita scale rating							Deaths	Injuries	Damage	Ref.
Date	Total	FU	F0	F1	F2	F3	F4	F5	Deaths	Injuries	Damage	Ref.
December 1	1	0	0	0	0	1	0	0	0	10	$250,000	
December 2	7	0	0	3	3	1	0	0	2	12	$62,750	
December 3	3	0	0	0	1	1	1	0	9	73	$20,050,000	
December 4	1	0	0	0	1	0	0	0	0	0	$25,000	
December 5	4	0	0	0	3	0	0	1	38	308	$25,350,000	
December 6	3	0	0	1	2	0	0	0	0	1	$52,500	
Total	19	0	0	4	10	3	1	1	49	404	$45,709,000	

Death toll
State	Total	County/ Parish	County/ Parish total
Texas	2	Washington	2
Louisiana	9	Vernon	7
Louisiana	9	La Salle	2
Mississippi	38	Warren	38
Totals	49		
All deaths were tornado-related

=== December 1 event ===
List of confirmed tornadoes – Tuesday, December 1, 1953 (Note: All dates are based on the local time zone where the tornado touched down; however, all times are in Coordinated Universal Time for consistency.) (Note: Prior to 1994, only the average widths of tornado paths were officially listed.)
F#	Location	County / Parish	State	Start Coord.	Time (UTC)	Path length	Max width	Summary
F3	SE of Seguin	Guadalupe	TX	29.50°N 97.93°W	01:00–?	5.1 mi (8.2 km)	1,760 yd (1,610 m)	Seven houses were destroyed, and seven others were damaged with total damages estimated at $250,000. (Note: All losses are in 1953 USD unless otherwise noted.) Ten people were injured. Grazulis classified the tornado as an F2.

=== December 2 event ===
List of confirmed tornadoes – Wednesday, December 2, 1953
F#	Location	County / Parish	State	Start Coord.	Time (UTC)	Path length	Max width	Summary
F3	Tanglewood	Lee	TX	30.50°N 96.97°W	12:15–?	3.3 mi (5.3 km)	100 yd (91 m)	Four people were injured by this unusual northwest-moving tornado. Two churches and three houses were destroyed with damages estimated at $25,000. Grazulis classified the tornado as an F2.
F2	Lane City	Wharton	TX	29.20°N 96.03°W	16:30–?	1.5 mi (2.4 km)	200 yd (180 m)	This tornado moved northward through Lane City and pushed two farmhouses off their foundations. There was $2,500 in damages.
F2	W of Navasota	Washington	TX	30.37°N 96.18°W	19:35–?	0.1 mi (0.16 km)	50 yd (46 m)	2 deaths – Two people died when their house was completely destroyed, and five others were injured. A barn was demolished, and a windmill and two other homes sustained some damage.
F1	Pollok	Angelina	TX	31.43°N 94.90°W	20:45–?	2.7 mi (4.3 km)	100 yd (91 m)	Three houses were unroofed, two garages were damaged, two other houses were "blown out of plumb", and a dwelling was moved off its foundation in the town of Pollok. Damage was estimated at $2,500.
F2	WSW of Bryan	Brazos	TX	30.63°N 96.48°W	21:30–?	0.2 mi (0.32 km)	67 yd (61 m)	A strong tornado struck near Bryan Air Force Base and obliterated a house. Damage was estimated at $25,000.
F1	ENE of Lone Grove to Dougherty to Sulphur to WNW of Hickory	Carter, Murray	OK	34.37°N 97.07°W	01:30–?	31.4 mi (50.5 km)	880 yd (800 m)	This large, long-track tornado touched down multiple times. West of Ardmore, the tornado injured one person and caused about $2,000 in damage. In Sulphur, the tornado injured another person and caused an additional $3,000 in damage. Both of the injured lived in Murray County.
F1	Shawnee	Pottawatomie	OK	35.33°N 96.92°W	03:30–?	1.5 mi (2.4 km)	880 yd (800 m)	A large, but weak tornado moved northeastward directly through Shawnee, injuring one person and leaving a well-defined path of mostly minor damage that totaled about $2,500.

=== December 3 event ===
List of confirmed tornadoes – Thursday, December 3, 1953
F#	Location	County / Parish	State	Start Coord.	Time (UTC)	Path length	Max width	Summary
F4	Fort Polk to Northwestern Alexandria to Dry Prong to Tullos	Vernon, Rapides, Grant, La Salle	LA	31.07°N 93.05°W	07:00–09:15	85.5 mi (137.6 km)	300 yd (270 m)	9 deaths – See section on this tornado – A total of 50 people were injured.
F2	SE of South Mansfield	Winn	LA	32.00°N 93.70°W	09:00–?	1 mi (1.6 km)	100 yd (91 m)	This low-end F2 tornado caused three injuries and $25,000 in damage. Only one house was destroyed.
F3	W of Fitler to Cary to ENE of Rolling Fork	Issaquena, Sharkey	MS	32.73°N 91.07°W	11:30–?	18.8 mi (30.3 km)	300 yd (270 m)	This strong tornado touched down along the Mississippi-Louisiana border and proceeded northeast, causing major damage as it passed near the town of Cary. A total of 34 houses and cars were destroyed or damaged and 20 people were injured (all in Issequena County). Damages were estimated at $2.75 million.

=== December 4 event ===
List of confirmed tornadoes – Friday, December 4, 1953
F#	Location	County / Parish	State	Start Coord.	Time (UTC)	Path length	Max width	Summary
F2	Mount Bethel	Cobb	GA	33.97°N 84.42°W	22:35–?	1 mi (1.6 km)	100 yd (91 m)	This strong tornado struck south of East Cobb in the Northern Suburbs of Atlanta. Shingles were blown off several houses and a store, and a small garage was shaken from its foundation. The most damage occurred at the Parkaire Airport, where three hangars and 20 or more airplanes were severely damaged. Losses totaled at about $25,000.

=== December 5 event ===
List of confirmed tornadoes – Saturday, December 5, 1953
F#	Location	County / Parish	State	Start Coord.	Time (UTC)	Path length	Max width	Summary
F2	Bernice to S of Mount Union	Union	LA	32.80°N 92.67°W	22:00–?	9.7 mi (15.6 km)	33 yd (30 m)	This strong tornado destroyed or badly damaged four houses in rural areas south of Spearsville. A number of other houses and structures incurred lesser damage. A total of 16 people sustained injuries and estimated losses totaled $25,000.
F2	N of Spencer, LA to NNW of Cosgrove, AR	Union (LA), Morehouse (LA), Ashley (AR)	LA, AR	32.75°N 92.13°W	23:00–00:00	58.3 mi (93.8 km)	880 yd (800 m)	This strong, long-tracked tornado family may have begun in Ouachita Parish and continued through Rocky Branch and Spencer where 14 houses were significantly damaged. At least 14 people may have been injured in Spencer, but some of the injuries are not officially listed. Heavy unspecified damage also occurred between Stevenson and Beekman. Finally, the tornado destroyed nine houses in Montrose and dissipated shortly thereafter. Officially, the tornado injured 11 people (all from Union Parish) and losses totaled $300,000. Tornado researcher Thomas P. Grazulis and NWS Jackson classified this tornado as an F3.
F5	Delta, LA to Vicksburg, MS to SW of Villanova, MS	Madison (LA), Warren (MS)	LA, MS	32.33°N 90.90°W	23:31–23:40	9 mi (14 km)	500 yd (460 m)	38 deaths – See article on this tornado – 270 people were injured and damages reached $25 million. Some tornado experts dispute the rating, claiming that the tornado only deserved an F4 rating.
F2	SW of Sherard, MS to NNE of Fair Landing, AR	Coahoma	MS	34.20°N 90.73°W	02:15–?	8.2 mi (13.2 km)	30 yd (27 m)	This tornado may have first touched down in Deeson, Bolivar County; however, damage officially began west of Clarksdale. This tornado behaved in an atypical manner as it moved toward the north-northwest. This tornado damaged or destroyed 19 houses, and its total path length may have been as high as 13 mi (21 km) since it may have ended north of Lyon. A total of 11 people were injured, and estimated losses totaled $25,000.

=== December 6 event ===
List of confirmed tornadoes – Sunday, December 6, 1953
F#	Location	County / Parish	State	Start Coord.	Time (UTC)	Path length	Max width	Summary
F1	NW of Headland	Henry	AL	31.38°N 85.40°W	13:00–?	0.1 mi (0.16 km)	10 yd (9.1 m)	This brief tornado with a "black as night" colored funnel occurred near Napier Field and caused about $2,500 in damages.
F2	E of Headland	Henry	AL	31.37°N 85.27°W	14:00–?	2 mi (3.2 km)	10 yd (9.1 m)	Eyewitness saw this strong tornado form about 100 yards (91 m) from his house. The tornado moved northeastward and damaged 15 houses. One person was injured and estimated damages are about $25,000.
F2	S of Meridian to SSE of Iamonia	Leon	FL	30.62°N 84.28°W	17:00–?	8.4 mi (13.5 km)	10 yd (9.1 m)	This strong tornado mostly remained over Lake Iamonia, but it still caused damage to several buildings, vehicles, and trees. Losses totaled $25,000.

=== Fort Polk–Alexandria–Dry Prong–Tullos, Louisiana ===
Fort Polk–Alexandria–Dry Prong–Tullos, Louisiana
Meteorological history
- Formed: December 3, 1953, 1:00 a.m. CST (UTC−05:00)
- Dissipated: December 3, 1953, 3:15 a.m. CST (UTC−05:00)
- Duration: 2 hours, 15 minutes

F4 tornado
- on the Fujita scale
- Highest winds: 245 mph (394 km/h)

Overall effects
- Fatalities: 9
- Injuries: 50
- Damage: $17.5 million
- Areas affected: Central Louisiana

This large, violent, deadly and long-track tornado was embedded within a much larger area of damaging straight-line winds, heavy rain, and a sharp temperature gradient. It followed an erratic path, devastating areas in and around Fort Polk, Alexandria, Georgetown, and Kisatchie National Forest during the early-morning hours of December 3. It first touched down in Fort Polk and caused heavy tree damage as it moved northeastward towards Alexandria. Then, the tornado moved through Lacamp and clipped the northwest side of Leander where, at peak intensity, it severely damaged four houses. Many other houses, barns, and miscelleanous buildings were damaged or destroyed as well. Seven of the nine fatalities occurred in Leander where the tornado caused $2.5 million in damages.

In Rapides Parish, the tornado caused some damage in the town of Hineston before moving back into rural areas. It proceeded into the town of Otis, clipped the northwest side of the Claiborne Range, then moved over the Kincaid Reservoir and into the western side of Alexandria. Along its northeasterly path, the tornado caused major damage in the northwestern section of Lee Heights as well as the Kingsville neighborhood where it destroyed or damaged 20 houses. The tornado then made an abrupt turn to the north-northwest (possibly occluding or reforming) and struck the Paradise community east of Tioga causing significant property damage. A trailer with four sleeping highway employees was thrown 100 yards (91 m), but all of them survived. Four buildings in the present-day town of Ball were destroyed and 43 others were damaged in the latter location. Throughout Rapides Parish, the tornado injured ten other people and caused $5 million in damage.

After entering Grant Parish and striking Pollock Municipal Airport, the tornado heavily damaged the town of Bentley. It then paralleled US-167 and struck the town of Dry Prong. From there, the tornado continued along a northeasterly track, clipping the towns of Breezy Hill and Western Lincecum and heavily damaging Mudville as it crossed over US 165. It passed through the town of Selma as well as the east side of Georgetown. Throughout Grant Parish, the tornado destroyed two houses, many barns, and other buildings, then damaged 25 other homes damaged, injured five people and caused $7.5 million in damage.

The tornado then entered La Salle Parish with catastrophic results. Severe damage occurred in a rural area before the tornado struck Tullos. Approximately 60 houses and many other buildings were damaged or destroyed, two small children were killed and 15 other people were injured. Thousands of trees were damaged in this area as well, many of which were downed or splintered, before the tornado rapidly weakened and dissipated. Damage in and around Tullos was estimated at $2.5 million.

The tornado (or tornado family) was on the ground for 85.5 miles (137.6 km) or at least two hours and 15 minutes with a maximum width of 300 yards (270 m). It damaged mostly harvested crops and agricultural supplies in storage in addition to damaging or destroying thousands of trees. The same storm produced very severe lightning with little thunder that affected Colfax. The tornado also passed 20 mi (32 km) east of a climatological substation near Winnfield, which showed a rapid rise of 5° and then a very rapid fall of 12°. High winds accompanied the tornado over an area of 20 mi (32 km), and excessive rainfall also affected the entire area. Grazulis listed the event as three separate tornadoes from different storms rather than the same storm with the F4 tornado being the last of three; he rated the other two tornadoes F2.

=== Vicksburg, Mississippi ===
Vicksburg, Mississippi
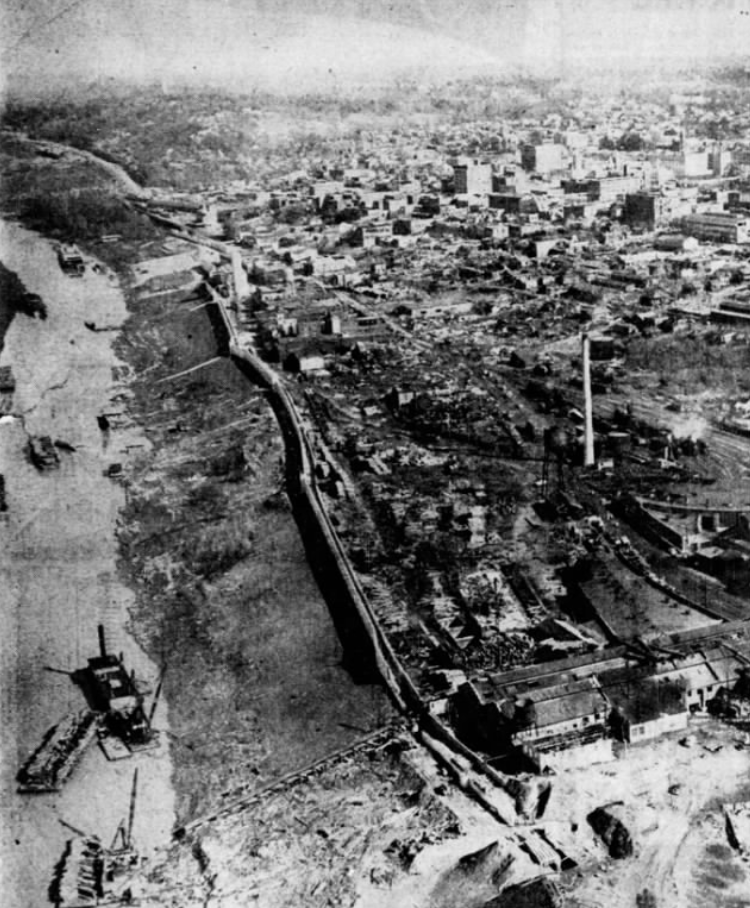
- An aerial view of the damage by the tornado in Vicksburg.

Meteorological history
- Formed: December 5, 1953, 5:31 p.m. CST (UTC−06:00)
- Dissipated: December 5, 1953, 5:40 p.m. CST (UTC−06:00)
- Duration: 9 minutes

F5 tornado
- on the Fujita scale
- Highest winds: 265 mph (426 km/h)

Overall effects
- Fatalities: 38
- Injuries: 270
- Damage: $25 million
- Areas affected: Vicksburg and Waltersville in Warren County

This powerful and destructive tornado touched down near the small community of Delta, Louisiana in Madison Parish, the rapidly growing and strengthening tornado would then crossed the Yazoo River in Warren County, Mississippi, and struck Downtown Vicksburg, causing major devastation throughout the city. It destroyed electrical services and multiple buildings in and around downtown, ignited several fires, and totaled numerous automobiles. The tornado was officially given an F5 rating, but the rating is questionable since the tornado reportedly demolished only frail structures. Thomas P. Grazulis unofficially gave this tornado an F4 rating.

== Non-tornadic effects ==
On December 1, severe thunderstorm winds destroyed several barns and chicken houses, damaged a house, and blew down a few trees in Huntsville, Texas. Several fronts produced strong winds throughout various regions on December 4, causing severe damage and several casualties. In Southeastern Wisconsin, one person was killed and another was injured while in Central Arizona, there were seven injuries and one death. Additionally, severe thunderstorm winds injured seven people near Clarksdale, Mississippi on December 5.

== Aftermath and recovery ==
The F4 tornado in Louisiana temporarily knocked out power to the Alexandria area, hampering communications. The tornado was initially headed towards the downtown area as well as the VA hospital, however it dodged five miles north of the city. No one was injured and no property damage was reported there or in the city.

In Vicksburg, Mississippi, the F5 tornado broke the city's gas line, which remained out of service after repairs. Residents were forced to go without cooked food even as temperatures dropped to 31 °F (−1 °C) overnight on December 6.

== See also ==
- 1966 Candlestick Park tornado outbreak – A small, but significant outbreak that produced a powerful F5 tornado that devastated portions of Jackson, Mississippi
- 2011 Philadelphia, Mississippi tornado – First of two EF5 tornadoes in Mississippi during the 2011 Super Outbreak
- 2011 Smithville tornado – Second of two EF5 tornadoes in Mississippi during the 2011 Super Outbreak
- List of F5 and EF5 tornadoes
- List of tornadoes and tornado outbreaks
  - List of North American tornadoes and tornado outbreaks
