= Rose Hill Farm =

Rose Hill Farm may refer to:

- Rose Hill Farm (Upperville, Virginia), listed on the NRHP in Virginia
- Rose Hill Farm (Winchester, Virginia), listed on the NRHP in Virginia
- Rose Hill Farm (Shepherdstown, West Virginia), listed on the NRHP in West Virginia
- Rose Hill Farmstead, Vincennes Indiana

== See also ==
- Rose Hill (disambiguation)
- Rose Hill Plantation (disambiguation)
