= Leander, Louisiana =

- Unincorporated community
- Location within Louisiana Location within the United States
- Coordinates: 31°08′55″N 92°50′48″W
- Country: United States
- State: Louisiana
- Parish: Vernon
- Elevation: 236 ft (72 m)
- Time zone: UTC-6 (Central (CST))
  - Summer (DST): UTC-5 (CDT)
- ZIP code: 71438
- Area code: 337
- GNIS feature ID: 555010

Leander (also Leandre) is an unincorporated community in Vernon Parish, Louisiana, United States. Its ZIP code is 71438.

Leander did not participate in the 2010 census.

== 1953 tornado ==
On December 3, 1953, a tornado clipped the northwest side of town, causing tremendous damage with four homes incurring F4-level damage. Seven people were killed, and 20 others were injured.
