= Flowers, Mississippi =

- Unincorporated community
- Location within Mississippi Location within the United States
- Coordinates: 32°23′22″N 90°40′26″W
- Country: United States
- State: Mississippi
- County: Warren
- Time zone: UTC-6 (Central (CST))
  - Summer (DST): UTC-5 (CDT)
- GNIS feature ID: 691863

Flowers is an unincorporated community in Warren County, Mississippi. It is located approximately three miles east of Bovina and is part of the Vicksburg Micropolitan Statistical Area. The Ceres Industrial Park, one of many industrial areas in Warren County, is located in Flowers.
