= Rose Hill Historic District =

Rose Hill Historic District may refer to:

- Rose Hill Historic District (Sioux City, Iowa), listed on the NRHP in Iowa
- Rose Hill Historic District (Versailles, Kentucky), listed on the NRHP in Kentucky

== See also ==
- Rose Hill (disambiguation) § United States 2
