= Yokena, Mississippi =

- Unincorporated community
- Location within Mississippi Location within the United States
- Coordinates: 32°10′31″N 90°56′31″W
- Country: United States
- State: Mississippi
- County: Warren
- Time zone: UTC-6 (Central (CST))
  - Summer (DST): UTC-5 (CDT)
- GNIS feature ID: 679954

Yokena is an unincorporated community in southern Warren County, Mississippi, United States. It is bordered to the south by the Big Black River, to the north by Warrenton, to the east by Campbell Swamp, and to the west by U.S. Highway 61.

Yokena was named for the old Hyland Plantation that was originally known as Lucca Yokena, which means 'Black Dirt' in the local Choctaw language. There are no major industrial or commercial entities in Yokena.

The major roadways in Yokena are U.S. Highway 61, Hankinson Road, Jeff Davis Road, and Campbell Swamp Road.

There are two noteworthy landmarks in Yokena: The Yokena Presbyterian Church and the Hankinson Road pivot bridge over the Big Black River. Yokena Presbyterian Church was organized on May 11, 1884, and was built on land that was part of a Spanish land grant and given by Mrs. Patty Hyland Gould Hankinson. Dedication was held August 5, 1886. The first pastor, the Reverend Charles Pier Colmery, served from 1888 until his death in 1938.

== Climate ==
The climate in this area is characterized by relatively high temperatures and evenly distributed precipitation throughout the year. According to the Köppen Climate Classification system, Yokena has a Humid subtropical climate, abbreviated "Cfa" on climate maps.

Climate data for Yokena, Mississippi
Month	Jan	Feb	Mar	Apr	May	Jun	Jul	Aug	Sep	Oct	Nov	Dec	Year
Mean daily maximum °C (°F)	14 (57)	16 (60)	20 (68)	24 (75)	28 (82)	31 (88)	32 (90)	32 (90)	30 (86)	25 (77)	19 (66)	15 (59)	24 (75)
Mean daily minimum °C (°F)	4 (40)	6 (43)	9 (49)	13 (56)	18 (64)	21 (70)	23 (73)	22 (72)	19 (67)	14 (57)	8 (47)	6 (42)	14 (57)
Average precipitation mm (inches)	130 (5.2)	120 (4.9)	150 (5.8)	130 (5.3)	110 (4.3)	97 (3.8)	110 (4.2)	81 (3.2)	71 (2.8)	64 (2.5)	100 (4.1)	130 (5.2)	1,300 (51.2)
Source: Weatherbase
