= Bedford Brown =

American politician

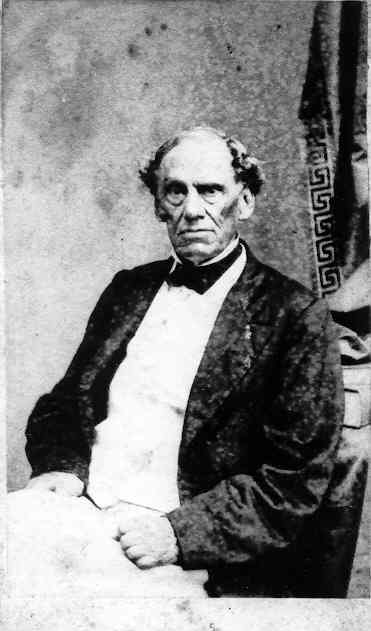

United States Senator from North Carolina
- In office December 9, 1829 – November 16, 1840
- Preceded by: John Branch
- Succeeded by: Willie P. Mangum

Member of the North Carolina Senate
- In office 1828–1828; 1858–1860

Member of the North Carolina House of Commons
- In office 1815–1817; 1823

Personal details
- Born: June 6, 1795 Caswell County, North Carolina, U.S.
- Died: December 6, 1870 (aged 75) Caswell County, North Carolina, U.S.
- Party: Democratic

Bedford Brown (June 6, 1795 – December 6, 1870) was a Democratic United States Senator from the State of North Carolina between 1829 and 1840.

== Biography ==
Bedford Brown was born on June 6, 1795, in what now is Locust Hill Township, Caswell County, North Carolina. His parents were Jethro Brown and Lucy Williamson Brown. After attending the University of North Carolina for one year, Brown was elected to the North Carolina House of Commons.

On July 13, 1816, Brown married Mary Lumpkin Glenn. The couple had seven children: William Livingston, Bedford, Jr., Wilson Glenn, Isabella Virginia, Laura, and Rosalie.

In 1828, upon the death of Bartlett Yancey, Jr., Brown was chosen in a special election to replace Yancey in the North Carolina Senate. Like Bartlett Yancey, Jr., before him, Brown was elected Speaker of the North Carolina Senate.

In 1829, he was elected as a Jacksonian (the party that would become the Democratic Party) to succeed John Branch as a United States Senator from North Carolina. In the Senate, he chaired several committees, including the Agriculture Committee. Brown resigned his seat in 1840 due to a dispute with the state legislature. He was elected to the state Senate again in 1842, before spending some years out of the state.

Leading up to the Civil War, Brown, a state senator again from 1858 to 1860, counseled in favor of North Carolina's remaining in the Union. However, after President Lincoln requested troops from North Carolina to serve in the Union Army, Brown, along with most of his colleagues, supported secession.

In 1868 Brown, still a Democrat, was again elected to the North Carolina Senate. However, the Reconstruction Republicans controlled the North Carolina Legislature and refused to seat Brown. He was replaced by Republican John W. Stephens.

Brown was buried on the grounds at Rose Hill, just outside Yanceyville, North Carolina. Rose Hill was added to the National Register of Historic Places in 1973.

== Descendants ==
Brown was the grandfather of architect Glenn Brown.

== Footnotes ==
U.S. Senate
Preceded by John Branch	U.S. senator (Class 2) from North Carolina; 1829–1840; Served alongside: James Iredell, Jr., Willie P. Mangum, Robert Strange	Succeeded by Willie P. Mangum
