= Rose Hills =

Rose Hills may refer to:

- Rose Hills Memorial Park, a cemetery
- Rose Hills, California, a census-designated place consisting of the area around the cemetery
- Rose Hills, Los Angeles, a neighborhood surrounding Rose Hill Park.

== See also ==
- Rose Hill (disambiguation)
