= Rosehill =

Rosehill may refer to:

== Places ==
=== Australia ===
- Rosehill, New South Wales, in Sydney, Australia

=== Canada ===
- Rosehill, Ontario, a neighborhood in Caledon, Ontario
- Rosehill, Toronto, a neighborhood in the Toronto-St. Paul electoral district

=== Ireland ===
- Rosehill, Templeport, a townland in County Cavan, Ireland

=== New Zealand ===
- Rosehill, New Zealand, a suburb of Auckland

=== United Kingdom ===
- Rosehill, Aberdeenshire, an area of Aberdeen, Scotland
- Rosehill, Cornwall
- Rosehill, Greater Manchester, England, a U.K. location
- Rosehill, Lancashire, England, a U.K. location
- Rosehill, London
- Rosehill, North Tyneside, England, a U.K. location
- Rosehill, Pembrokeshire, Wales, a U.K. location
- Rosehill, Shropshire, a U.K. location
- Rosehill Quarry Community Park, Swansea, Wales
- Rosehill, Wrexham, Wales
- Rosehill, the Coventry home of Charles Bray that frequently hosted intellectuals and reformers

=== United States ===
- Rosehill Cemetery, Chicago, Illinois
- Rosehill (Gambrills, Maryland), a historic home on the National Register in Anne Arundel County, Maryland
- Rosehill, Mississippi, Marion County, Mississippi
- Rosehill, Philadelphia, a place in Pennsylvania
- Rose Hill, Texas

== Other uses ==
- Rosehill (elm hybrid) (Ulmus × intermedia 'Rosehill')
- Jay Rosehill (born 1985), professional ice hockey player
- SS Rosehill, a 1911 English steam cargo ship

== See also ==
- Rose Hill (disambiguation)
