= Rose Hill Township =

Rose Hill Township may refer to:

- Rose Hill Township, Cottonwood County, Minnesota
- Rose Hill Township, Johnson County, Missouri
- Rose Hill Township, Duplin County, North Carolina, in Duplin County, North Carolina
- Rose Hill Township, Foster County, North Dakota, in Foster County, North Dakota
- Rose Hill Township, McHenry County, North Dakota, in McHenry County, North Dakota
- Rose Hill Township, Hand County, South Dakota, in Hand County, South Dakota
