= Rose Hill, Rappahannock County, Virginia =

Unincorporated community in Virginia, US

Coordinates: 38°42′59″N 78°07′31″W

Rose Hill, Rappahannock County is an unincorporated community in Rappahannock County, in the U.S. state of Virginia.
