= Rose Hill Cemetery =

Rose Hill Cemetery may refer to:

== United Kingdom ==
- Rose Hill Cemetery, Oxford

== United States ==
- Rose Hill Cemetery (Arkadelphia, Arkansas)
- Rose Hill Cemetery (Harrison, Arkansas)
- Rose Hill Cemetery (Antioch, California), in the Black Diamond Mines Regional Preserve
- Rose Hill Cemetery, Nortonville, California
- Rose Hill Cemetery, Commerce City, Colorado
- Rose Hill Cemetery (Tarpon Springs, Florida), on the National Register of Historic Places for Pinellas County, Florida
- Rose Hill Cemetery (Macon, Georgia), listed on the NRHP in Georgia
- Rose Hill Cemetery, Royston, a cemetery in Georgia
- Rose Hill Cemetery and Goddard Chapel, Marion, Illinois
- Rose Hill Cemetery, Bloomington, Indiana
- Rose Hill Cemetery, Elizabeth, Indiana
- Rose Hill Cemetery, Cain Township, Fountain County, Indiana
- Rose Hill Cemetery, Albion Township, Noble County, Indiana
- Rose Hill Cemetery, Calamus, Iowa
- Rose Hill Cemetery, Central City, a cemetery in Kentucky
- Rose Hill Cemetery (Maryland)
- Rose Hill Cemetery, Volinia Township, Michigan
- Rose Hill Cemetery, Meridian, Mississippi
- Rose Hill Cemetery, Massillon, a cemetery in Ohio
- Rose Hill Cemetery (Columbia, Tennessee)
- Rose Hill Cemetery (Texarkana, Texas)

== See also ==
- Rose Hill Burial Park (Oklahoma City, Oklahoma)
- Rose Hills Memorial Park, in Whittier, California
