= Rose Hill, Warren County, Mississippi =

Rose Hill, Mississippi
- Unincorporated community
- Location within Mississippi Location within the United States
- Coordinates: 32°21′33″N 90°48′25″W
- Country: United States
- State: Mississippi
- County: Warren
- Elevation: 331 ft (101 m)
- Time zone: UTC-6 (Central (CST))
  - Summer (DST): UTC-5 (CDT)
- Area codes: 601 & 769
- GNIS feature ID: 692185

Rose Hill is an unincorporated community in Warren County, Mississippi, United States.
