= Warren County, Mississippi =

County in Mississippi, United States

- County
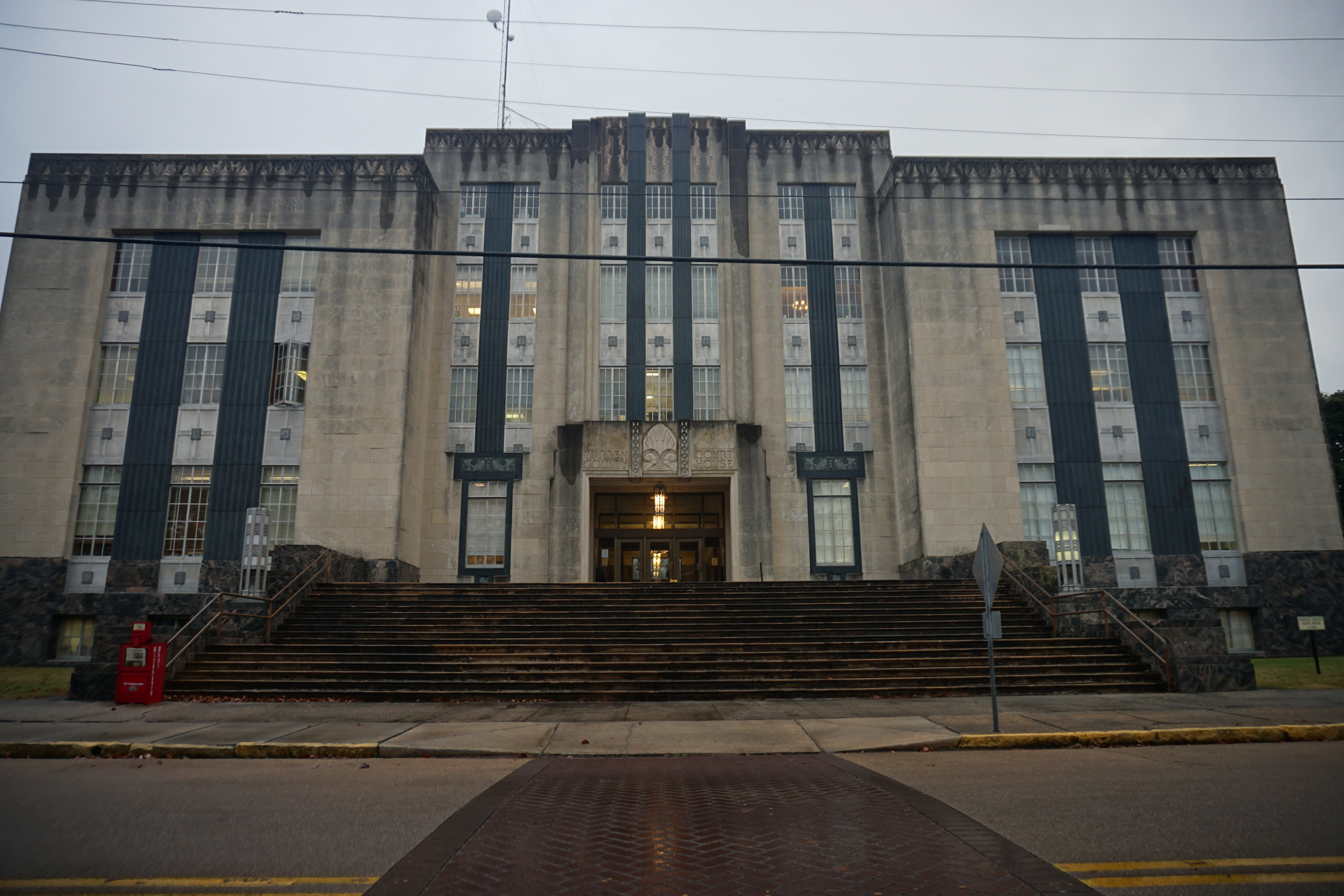
- Warren County Courthouse in Vicksburg, built c. 1940, located across from the Old Courthouse Museum.

- Location within the U.S. state of Mississippi
- Coordinates: 32°22′N 90°51′W
- Country: United States
- State: Mississippi
- Founded: December 22, 1809
- Named for: Joseph Warren
- Seat: Vicksburg
- Largest city: Vicksburg

Area
  - Total: 619 sq mi (1,600 km^{2})
  - Land: 589 sq mi (1,530 km^{2})
  - Water: 30 sq mi (78 km^{2}) 4.9%

Population (2020)
  - Total: 44,722
  - Estimate (2025): 41,759 ▼
  - Density: 75.9/sq mi (29.3/km^{2})
- Time zone: UTC−6 (Central)
  - Summer (DST): UTC−5 (CDT)
- Congressional district: 2nd
- Website: www.co.warren.ms.us

Warren County is a county located in the U.S. state of Mississippi. Its western border is formed by the Mississippi River. As of the 2020 census, the population was 44,722. Its county seat is Vicksburg. Established by legislative act of December 22, 1809, Warren County is named for American Revolutionary War officer Joseph Warren.

Part of the Mississippi Delta and the historic cotton culture, Warren County had major plantations. Vicksburg was an important river port. Today the county is included in the Vicksburg, MS Micropolitan Statistical Area, which is also included in the Jackson-Vicksburg-Brookhaven, MS Combined Statistical Area.

== Geography ==
According to the U.S. Census Bureau, the county has a total area of 619 square miles (1,600 km^{2}), of which 589 square miles (1,530 km^{2}) is land and 30 square miles (78 km^{2}) (4.9%) is water.

The county exists in two sections, connected only by a narrow 500-foot wide section between Madison Parish, Louisiana and Issaquena County, Mississippi along the delta of the Yazoo River. This area was once along the Mississippi River, but has since become an oxbow lake and marsh and no roads traverse this strip of land. The community of Eagle Bend is in this area.

=== Major highways ===
- Interstate 20
- U.S. Route 61
- U.S. Route 80
- Mississippi Highway 3
- Mississippi Highway 27

=== Adjacent counties and parishes ===
- Issaquena County (north)
- Yazoo County (northeast)
- Hinds County (east)
- Claiborne County (south)
- Tensas Parish, Louisiana (southwest)
- Madison Parish, Louisiana (west)

=== National protected areas ===
- Theodore Roosevelt National Wildlife Refuge (part)
- Vicksburg National Military Park (part)

== Demographics ==
Historical population
Census	Pop.	Note	%±
1810	1,114		—
1820	2,693		141.7%
1830	7,861		191.9%
1840	15,820		101.2%
1850	18,120		14.5%
1860	20,696		14.2%
1870	26,769		29.3%
1880	31,238		16.7%
1890	33,164		6.2%
1900	40,912		23.4%
1910	37,488		−8.4%
1920	33,362		−11.0%
1930	35,785		7.3%
1940	39,595		10.6%
1950	39,616		0.1%
1960	42,206		6.5%
1970	44,981		6.6%
1980	51,627		14.8%
1990	47,880		−7.3%
2000	49,644		3.7%
2010	48,773		−1.8%
2020	44,722		−8.3%
2025 (est.)	41,759	▼	−6.6%
U.S. Decennial Census; 1790-1960 1900-1990; 1990-2000 2010-2013

Age pyramid Warren County

=== 2020 census ===
Warren County, Mississippi – Racial and ethnic composition Note: the US Census treats Hispanic/Latino as an ethnic category. This table excludes Latinos from the racial categories and assigns them to a separate category. Hispanics/Latinos may be of any race.
Race / Ethnicity (NH = Non-Hispanic)	Pop 1980	Pop 1990	Pop 2000	Pop 2010	Pop 2020	% 1980	% 1990	% 2000	% 2010	% 2020
White alone (NH)	31,582	28,743	27,049	24,143	20,909	61.17%	60.03%	54.49%	49.50%	46.75%
Black or African American alone (NH)	19,064	18,609	21,341	22,836	21,290	36.93%	38.87%	42.99%	46.82%	47.61%
Native American or Alaska Native alone (NH)	42	44	109	106	67	0.08%	0.09%	0.22%	0.22%	0.15%
Asian alone (NH)	316	223	303	412	364	0.61%	0.47%	0.61%	0.84%	0.81%
Native Hawaiian or Pacific Islander alone (NH)	x	x	5	10	0	x	x	0.01%	0.02%	0.00%
Other race alone (NH)	41	7	31	15	99	0.08%	0.01%	0.06%	0.03%	0.22%
Mixed race or Multiracial (NH)	x	x	292	355	1,117	x	x	0.59%	0.73%	2.50%
Hispanic or Latino (any race)	582	254	514	896	876	1.13%	0.53%	1.04%	1.84%	1.96%
Total	51,627	47,880	49,644	48,773	44,722	100.00%	100.00%	100.00%	100.00%	100.00%

=== 2020 census ===
As of the 2020 census, the county had a population of 44,722. The median age was 40.9 years. 23.3% of residents were under the age of 18 and 18.6% of residents were 65 years of age or older. For every 100 females there were 90.5 males, and for every 100 females age 18 and over there were 86.3 males age 18 and over.

The racial makeup of the county was 47.2% White, 47.9% Black or African American, 0.2% American Indian and Alaska Native, 0.8% Asian, <0.1% Native Hawaiian and Pacific Islander, 0.8% from some other race, and 3.1% from two or more races. Hispanic or Latino residents of any race comprised 2.0% of the population.

57.5% of residents lived in urban areas, while 42.5% lived in rural areas.

There were 18,480 households in the county, of which 30.5% had children under the age of 18 living in them. Of all households, 37.7% were married-couple households, 20.4% were households with a male householder and no spouse or partner present, and 36.5% were households with a female householder and no spouse or partner present. About 32.6% of all households were made up of individuals and 13.6% had someone living alone who was 65 years of age or older.

There were 21,452 housing units, of which 13.9% were vacant. Among occupied housing units, 66.2% were owner-occupied and 33.8% were renter-occupied. The homeowner vacancy rate was 1.4% and the rental vacancy rate was 10.1%.

=== 2010 census ===
In 2010, there were 48,773 people living in the county. 50.3% were White, 47.0% Black or African American, 0.8% Asian, 0.3% Native American, 0.7% of some other race and 0.9% of two or more races. 1.8% were Hispanic or Latino (of any race).

=== 2000 census ===
In 2000, there were 49,644 people, 18,756 households, and 13,222 families living in the county. The population density was 85 people per square mile (33 people/km^{2}). There were 20,789 housing units at an average density of 35 units per square mile (14 units/km^{2}). The racial makeup of the county was 54.97% White, 43.19% Black or African American, 0.23% Native American, 0.62% Asian, 0.02% Pacific Islander, 0.33% from other races, and 0.66% from two or more races. 1.04% of the population were Hispanic or Latino of any race.

2005 census estimates based on the American Community Survey suggested that non-Hispanic whites were 51.5% of Warren County's population. Warren County was the only county in Mississippi along the Mississippi River, in addition to Desoto, where whites made up a majority of the population. African Americans were 46.0% of the county's population. People identifying as of two or more races were 0.6%, less than in the previous ACS. The Latino population was 1.2% of the total for the county.

In 2000 there were 18,756 households, out of which 35.60% had children under the age of 18 living with them, 46.80% were married couples living together, 19.10% had a female householder with no husband present, and 29.50% were non-families. 25.80% of all households were made up of individuals, and 9.70% had someone living alone who was 65 years of age or older. The average household size was 2.61 and the average family size was 3.14.

In the county, the population was spread out, with 28.50% under the age of 18, 9.10% from 18 to 24, 28.40% from 25 to 44, 22.40% from 45 to 64, and 11.70% who were 65 years of age or older. The median age was 35 years. For every 100 females there were 88.30 males. For every 100 females age 18 and over, there were 84.40 males.

The median income for a household in the county was $35,056, and the median income for a family was $41,706. Males had a median income of $33,566 versus $21,975 for females. The per capita income for the county was $17,527. About 15.00% of families and 18.70% of the population were below the poverty line, including 27.80% of those under age 18 and 16.20% of those age 65 or over.

Warren County has the seventh highest per capita income in the state of Mississippi.

== Government and politics ==
Warren County was historically Democratic until 1948, then was a Republican stronghold until 2008 (when it was narrowly carried by John McCain), and has recently become a bellwether. It voted for Barack Obama in 2012, Donald Trump in 2016, Joe Biden in 2020, and Donald Trump in 2024. Warren County is one of two counties (the other being Nash County, North Carolina) to alternate its presidential vote the last five elections. (Note: Prince of Wales–Hyder Census Area, Alaska, although not a county, has also followed this pattern.)

=== Board of Supervisors ===
Members are elected from each of the five supervisory districts. The Board of Supervisors guides and establishes policies for the county government. Members of the board of make decisions regarding economic development, public health and welfare and county roads.

United States presidential election results for Warren County, Mississippi
Year	Republican		Democratic		Third party(ies)	
Year	No.	%	No.	%	No.	%
1912	55	4.11%	1,135	84.76%	149	11.13%
1916	73	5.69%	1,204	93.92%	5	0.39%
1920	161	12.80%	1,082	86.01%	15	1.19%
1924	328	15.46%	1,794	84.54%	0	0.00%
1928	530	16.07%	2,769	83.93%	0	0.00%
1932	169	6.47%	2,422	92.76%	20	0.77%
1936	122	3.63%	3,233	96.19%	6	0.18%
1940	192	5.92%	3,048	94.05%	1	0.03%
1944	304	8.67%	3,202	91.33%	0	0.00%
1948	245	5.88%	320	7.67%	3,605	86.45%
1952	3,458	59.38%	2,366	40.63%	0	0.00%
1956	2,419	45.40%	1,857	34.85%	1,052	19.74%
1960	2,277	34.57%	2,289	34.75%	2,021	30.68%
1964	7,409	81.96%	1,631	18.04%	0	0.00%
1968	2,392	16.95%	4,503	31.91%	7,217	51.14%
1972	10,420	71.97%	3,480	24.04%	578	3.99%
1976	8,699	55.39%	6,299	40.11%	707	4.50%
1980	10,151	56.00%	7,489	41.31%	488	2.69%
1984	12,959	60.99%	8,054	37.90%	235	1.11%
1988	12,507	62.01%	7,437	36.87%	226	1.12%
1992	10,209	49.61%	8,175	39.73%	2,194	10.66%
1996	9,261	47.77%	8,774	45.26%	1,350	6.96%
2000	10,892	58.49%	7,485	40.19%	246	1.32%
2004	11,356	57.71%	8,224	41.79%	99	0.50%
2008	11,152	51.24%	10,489	48.19%	123	0.57%
2012	10,457	48.89%	10,786	50.42%	148	0.69%
2016	9,767	50.30%	9,284	47.82%	365	1.88%
2020	10,365	49.23%	10,442	49.60%	246	1.17%
2024	9,407	51.41%	8,683	47.45%	208	1.14%

== Communities ==
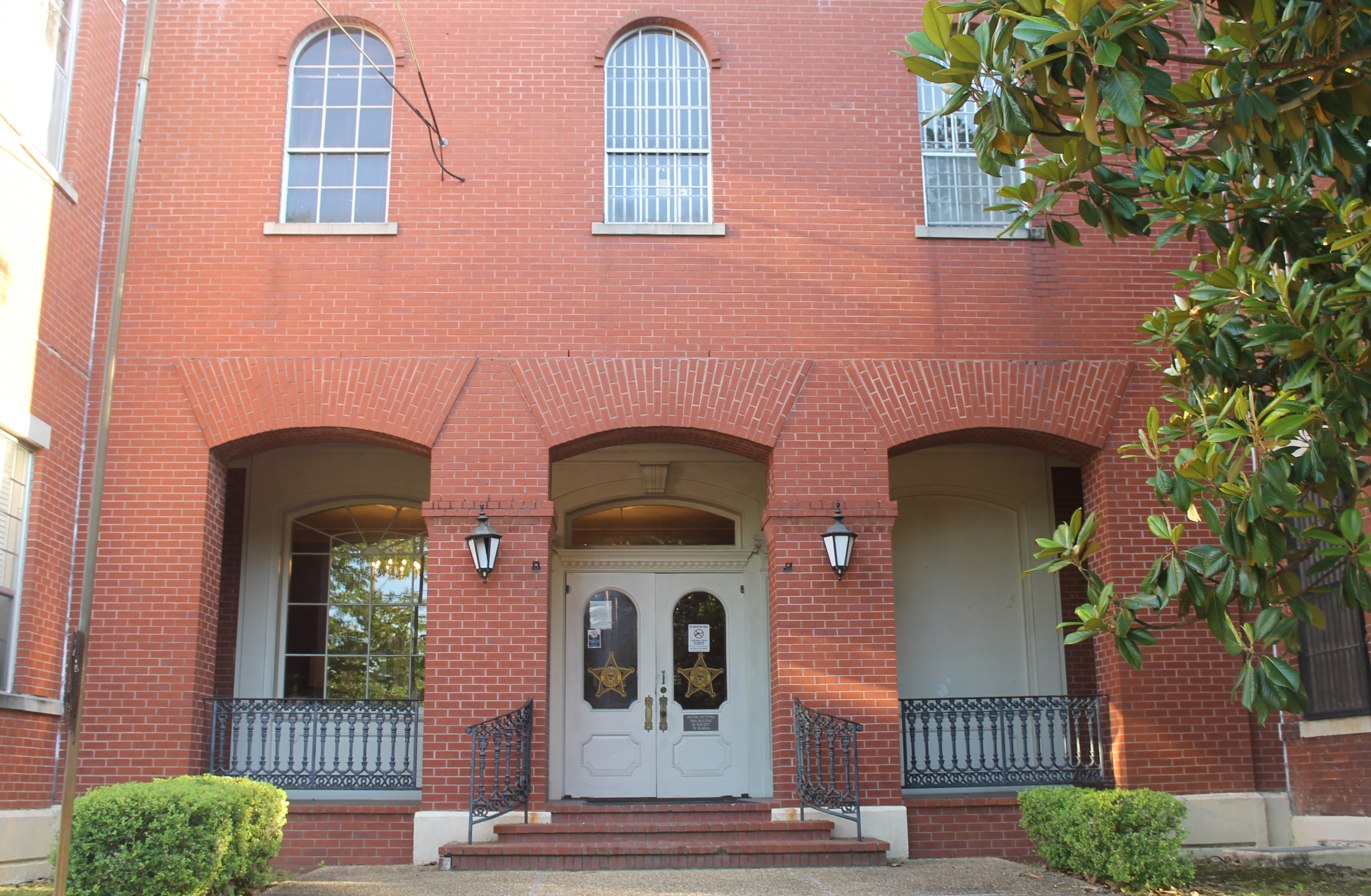
The Warren County sheriff's department is located in an annex building across from the courthouse.

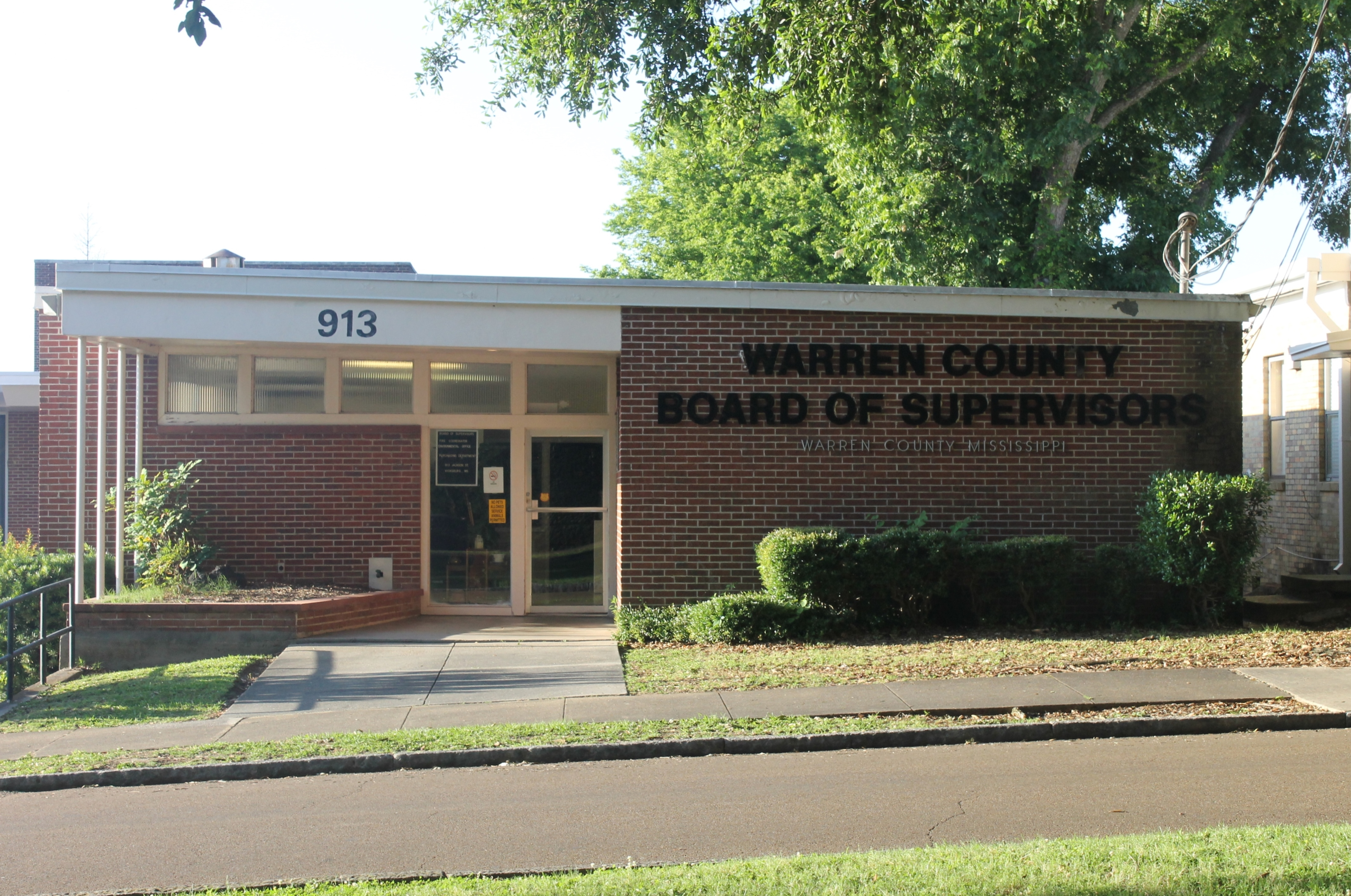
The Warren County Board of Supervisors meets in this mall building in Vicksburg.

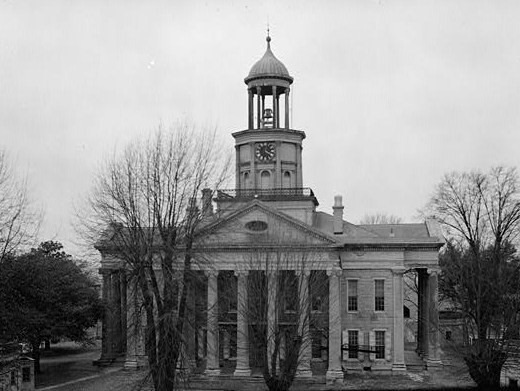
Old Courthouse Museum, also known as the Eva W. Davis Memorial is located in Vicksburg across the street from the 1940 courthouse.

=== City ===
- Vicksburg (county seat and only municipality)

=== Unincorporated areas ===
==== Census-designated places ====
- Beechwood
- Bovina
- Eagle Bend
- Redwood

==== Other communities ====
- Flowers
- LeTourneau settled by the Lynn family in 1910
- Rose Hill
- Waltersville
- Warrenton
- Yokena

=== Ghost towns ===
- Brunswick
- Nanachehaw

== Education ==
All of the county is in the Vicksburg Warren School District.

The county is in the district of Hinds Community College.

== Notable people ==
- Lawrence Owen Cooper Sr. (1908 – 1986), founder of Mississippi Chemical Corporation and past president of Southern Baptist Convention
- Sarah Gibson Humphreys (1830 – 1907), author and woman suffragist

== See also ==
- National Register of Historic Places listings in Warren County, Mississippi
- Joseph A. Biedenharn, first bottler of Coca-Cola
