= Rose Hill Manor =

Historic house in Maryland, United States

- U.S. National Register of Historic Places
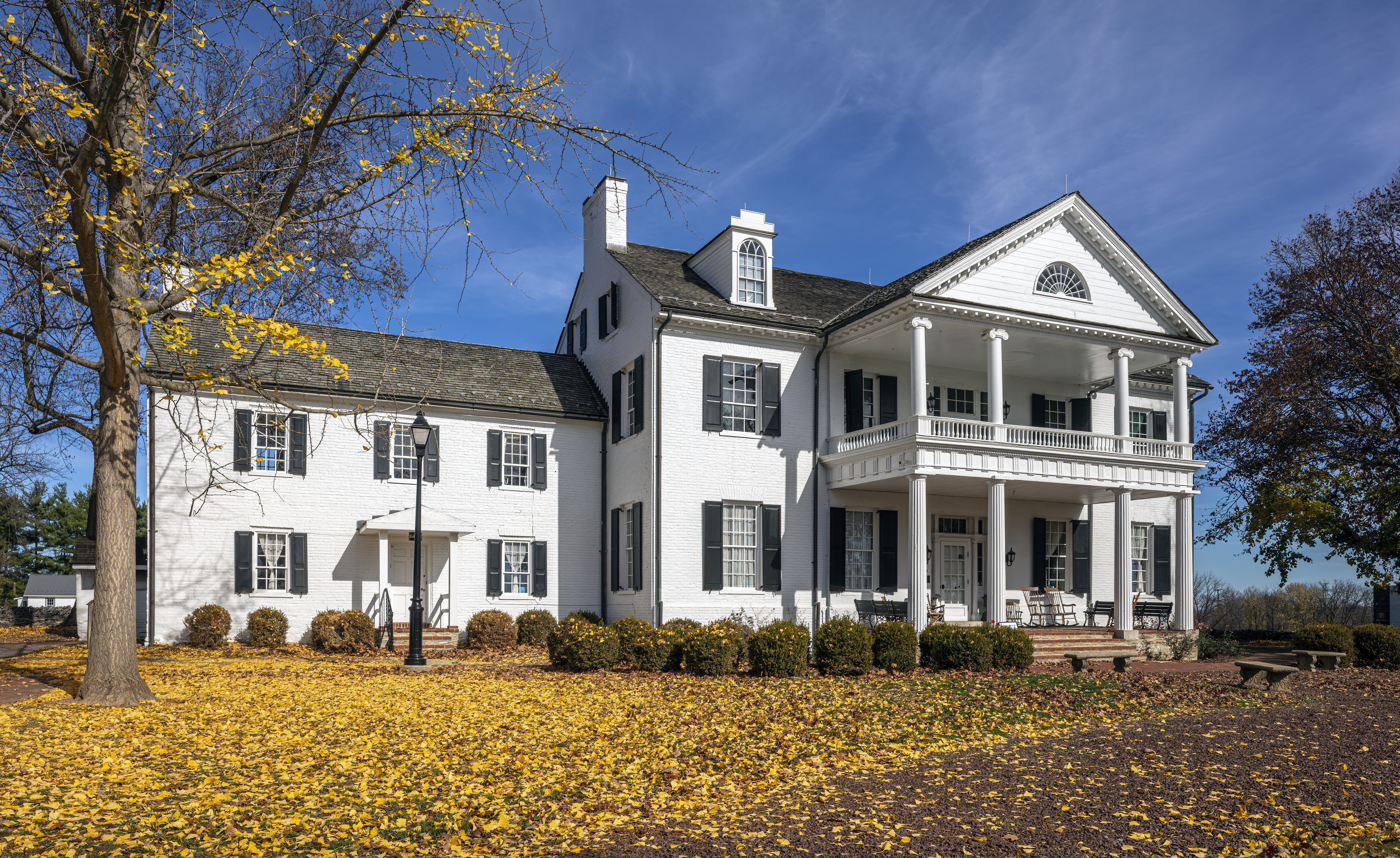
- Rose Hill Manor in November, 2022

- Location within Maryland Location within the United States
- Interactive map showing the location of Rose Hill Manor
- Location: 1611 N. Market St., Frederick, Maryland
- Coordinates: 39°26′11″N 77°24′21″W
- Area: 43.4 acres (17.6 ha)
- Built: 1792
- Architectural style: Federal / Georgian, Greek Revival
- NRHP reference No.: 71000374
- Added to NRHP: December 9, 1971

Rose Hill Manor, now known as Rose Hill Manor Park & Children's Museum, is a historic home located at Frederick, Frederick County, Maryland. It is a 2 1/2-story brick house. A notable feature is the large two-story pedimented portico supported by fluted Doric columns on the first floor and Ionic columns on the balustraded second floor. It was the retirement home of Thomas Johnson (1732–1819), the first elected governor of the State of Maryland and Associate Justice of the United States Supreme Court. It was built in the mid-1790s by his daughter and son-in-law.

It was listed on the National Register of Historic Places in 1971.

== History of the property ==
This land was a part of "Tasker's Chance", a 7,000-acre tract owned in 1726 by Benjamin Tasker. In 1737 a group of German farmers took out an option on the entire tract of land described as containing some of the area's finest potential home-sites. Unable to raise the sum of money Tasker had asked for the land, the small farmers, all of them poor, went to Annapolis lawyer and land speculator Daniel Dulany for financing. Agreeing to undertake the financial arrangements Dulany bought the option, then the tract itself, selling small lots to the enterprising Germans. One 225-acre section was bought in 1746 for 20 pounds by a German, Hans Peter Hoffman. He called the tract "Rose Garden." His descendants subsequently sold his whole plantation to Maryland's first elected governor, Thomas Johnson in 1778 for 4,000 pounds, current money of Maryland at that time.

The 225-acre tract was given by Governor Thomas Johnson to his eldest daughter, Ann Jennings Johnson as a wedding gift on the eve of her marriage to Major John Colin Graham. Following the death of his wife, Governor Johnson spent the last 25 years of his life living as a guest of his daughter Ann at Rose Hill.

Under Graham's hand, Rose Hill's acreage doubled. By the mid-1820s Graham was having problems making ends meet and he sold off some of his slaves, 100 acres of Rose Hill and 300 acres of a farm located 5 miles to the west of Rose Hill. His will instructed his wife to sell the estate after his death, pay debts and keep what was left.

=== Later ownership ===
- In 1833, Captain John McPherson who married Mrs. Graham's niece purchased Rose Hill. He never occupied the mansion, thus protecting Mrs. Graham's right to remain there until her death in 1837.
- In 1837, Rose Hill was sold to Colonel William Slater, an Irish immigrant and wealthy merchant from Philadelphia and Baltimore.
- In 1843, Colonel Slater sold the estate to his brother George.
- In 1845 the property was sold to John J. Willson (married to Anna Tyler) who spent a considerable amount of money on renovating it.
- In 1853 the estate was sold to David Ogle Thomas, a direct descendant of one of the original purchasers of Tasker's Chance. Upon his death, the property was left to his wife who sold it in 1894 and moved to Baltimore.
- The estate was on the market for 12 years and unoccupied, when the agent Noel Cramer bought it and lived in it until the mid-1920s. He gave it to his son, James, who thought it was too far from town and it was left vacant for 25 years, except in 1930 when it served as a hotel and restaurant.
- In the 1950s the Cramer's returned and restored it, but the owner died in 1957.
- In 1968, the board of county commissioners of Frederick County purchased the remaining 43-acre site for $401,400 of federal, state and county funds. The house is currently owned by the county and is operated as part of Rose Hill Manor Park & Children's Museum.
- In 1972 a unique 'see and touch' children's museum was opened in the mansion as a joint venture with the Frederick County Parks Commission and the board of education.

== Description of the house and property ==
Thought to have been built by local craftsman the Rose Hill manor house construction began shortly after the wedding of Ann Jennings Johnson and Major John Colin Graham. The construction of the 2 1/2-story, white frame, brick wall mansion stretched over an eight-year period from laying the foundation to its occupation around 1798.

The house rests on a low fieldstone foundation with brick cellar walls. The front façade faces the south and is laid in Flemish bond and all other is in common bond. A nineteenth century galleried portico with white columns fronts the mansion.

Rose Hill Mansion is approached by a driveway off an entrance road adjoining the northern boundary of Governor Thomas Johnson High School from the west side of North Market Street.

The portico forms two porches: One is on the ground floor at the entrance level with four Doric columns supporting a structure between the columns and a roof consisting of an architrave, frieze and elaborate, carved cornice. The other is above on the second floor with four Ionic columns supporting the pediment lighted by a lunette window. On either side of the large pediment, the roof is pierced by a dormer window with round-arch and a parapet. A similar pediment with a lunette window also graces the rear elevation of the mansion. A flush chimney rises from each gable end of the main block. The mansion's design reflects the late Georgian style of Tidewater, Maryland and the Greek Revival style.

At the north end of the wide entrance hall is a broad staircase that rises to a landing from which a window overlooks the north garden. The stair continues up in units of six steps to the third story. The upper rails and banisters are light in weight and plain.

Off the east side of the entrance hall is a 26-foot square, high ceiling drawing room containing six windows, a mantel piece and a large chandelier with crystal prisms.

To the west of the entrance hall is a dining room of the same dimensions which recalls an age of good living and entertainment.

The second floor center hall south door opens directly onto the upper level of the front porch that faces the high school.

On either side of the upper hall are two large bedrooms with fireplaces and two smaller bedrooms that have had a section partitioned off for a bathroom.

A kitchen with a fireplace and beehive oven is adjoined to the western side of the mansion with a flush brick chimney rising from the west gable end. There is a service entrance at the front and a verandah on the back overlooking formal gardens. There are several small rooms over the kitchen.

Windows on the first floor are nine-over-nine sash and on the second floor are nine-over-six sash all with colonial shutters having widely spaced louvers with hand wrought hardware and headed by jack arches.

The attic contains two large finished rooms. It is lighted by nine-over-six sash pane round arched dormer windows headed by local style stepped gables on the front and rear.

A formal, native fieldstone walled garden and orchard with old trees occupies about a half an acre on the northern side of the mansion. The garden is accented by an attractive, two-tier cast iron fountain with the pedestal and bowls decorated by Greek acanthus leaves. This was topped by a "putti" [cherub] embracing a swan.

Other buildings include a brick smokehouse with hour glass design louvers, a hipped roof summer kitchen, ice house, old tool shed, an 1835 log cabin, a new building known as the Robert H. Renneberger Carriage Museum features a collection of restored carriages and sleighs, a carriage repair shop and blacksmith shop, three exhibit buildings housing steam engines, antique farm machinery and a livestock barn, the Farm Museum displays include tractors, 19th and early 20th century agriculture tools and equipment, farm family life, a carpentry shop and a broom shop.

== Rose Hill Manor Park & Children's Museum ==
Address: 1611 North Market Street, Frederick, Maryland 21701

The mission of Rose Hill Manor Park and Museums is to preserve and present the living heritage of the property known as Rose Hill from 1746 to 1950. In a child-friendly, hands-on environment the museums present the daily life of Thomas Johnson, Maryland's first governor, and the individuals who lived on the property as well as the history of agriculture and transportation in Frederick County

(Updated 1 Feb 2014 by Frederick Chapter National Society Daughters of the American Revolution Historic Preservation Committee)
