= Rose Hill (Locust Hill, North Carolina) =

Historic house in North Carolina, United States

- U.S. National Register of Historic Places
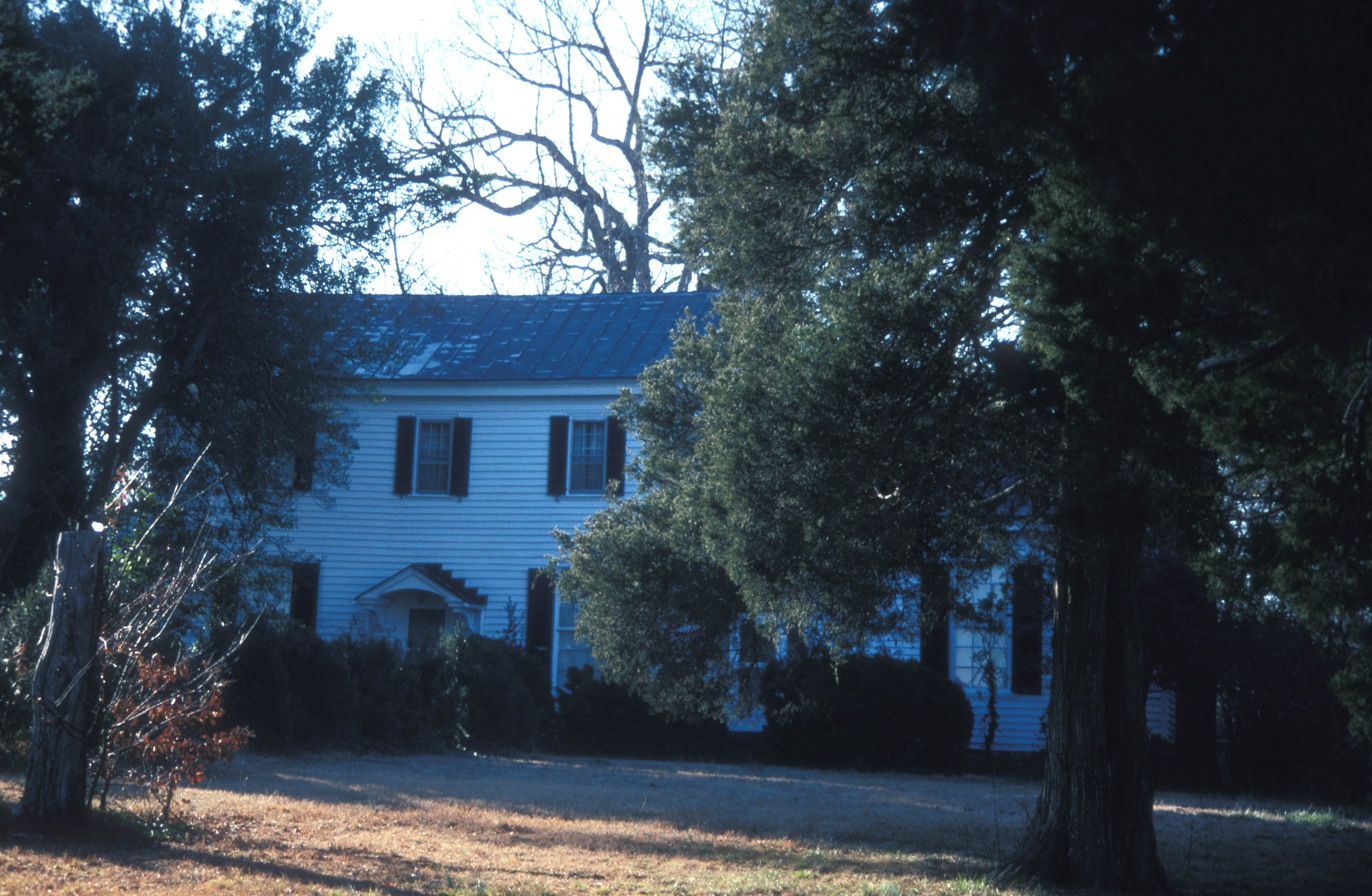
- Rose Hill, July 1971

- Location within North Carolina Location within the United States
- Location: On U.S. 158 at jct. with NC 150, Locust Hill, North Carolina
- Coordinates: 36°22′22″N 79°25′59″W
- Area: 9 acres (3.6 ha)
- Built: 1802, c. 1835
- Architectural style: Federal
- NRHP reference No.: 73001305
- Added to NRHP: October 25, 1973

Rose Hill, also known as the Bedford Brown House, is a historic plantation house located near Locust Hill, Caswell County, North Carolina. It was built in 1802, and Federal style frame dwelling consisting of two blocks connected by an enclosed breezeway. The main block is two stories, three bays by two bays, connected to a one-bay by one-bay block by the breezeway. Also on the property is a contributing is a steep hip-roof smokehouse. It was the home of U.S. Senator Bedford Brown (1795-1870).

It was added to the National Register of Historic Places in 1973.
