= Rose Hill Plantation House =

Historic house in South Carolina, United States

- U.S. National Register of Historic Places
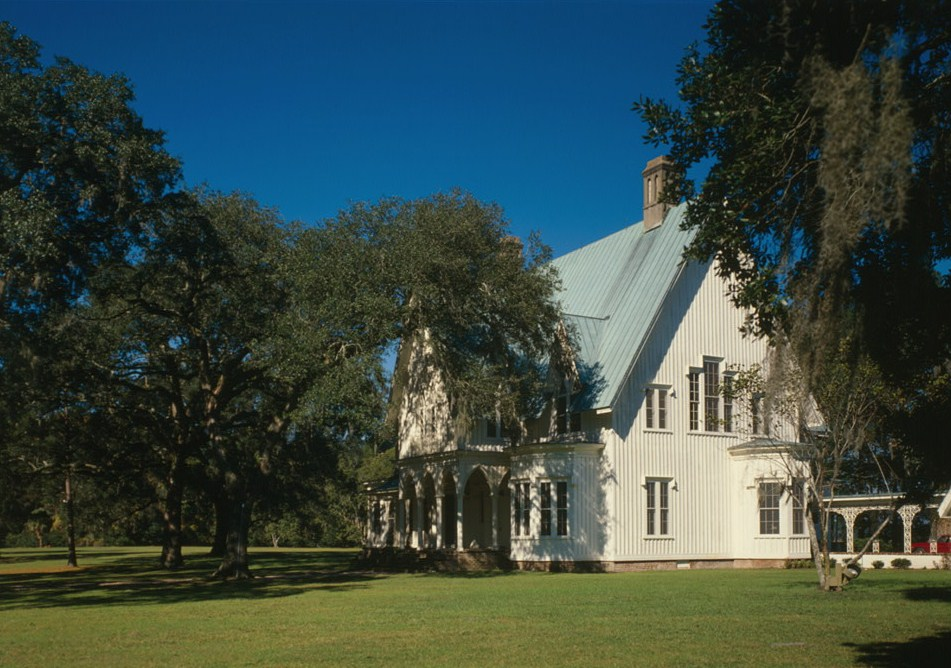
- Rose Hill Plantation House in 1986

- Location within South Carolina Location within the United States
- Nearest city: Bluffton, South Carolina
- Coordinates: 32°17′42″N 80°52′31″W
- Area: 11.7 acres (4.7 ha)
- Built: 1858, 1946-1949
- Architect: 1858, unknown; 1946-1949, Willis Irvin
- Architectural style: Carpenter Gothic
- NRHP reference No.: 83002185
- Added to NRHP: May 19, 1983

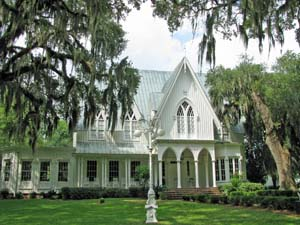
Rose Hill Mansion, Bluffton, SC

Rose Hill Plantation House (sometimes Rose Hill Mansion) is an historic Carpenter Gothic house located on US 278 in Bluffton, Beaufort County, South Carolina. It was begun in 1858 for Dr. John Kirk and Caroline Kerk, his wife, but construction was interrupted by the Civil War and not resumed until after World War II when it was renovated and finished by architect Willis Irvin for John Sturgeon and Florence Sturgeon, his wife. On May 19, 1983, it was added to the National Register of Historic Places. It preserves the antebellum plantation home of Dr. & Mrs. John William (1803–1868) & Caroline (1815–1864) Kirk, a wealthy enslaver and physician.

According to tradition, the house was spared ordered destruction during the Civil War after a Union soldier declared "this house is too beautiful to be burned".

== History ==
The original Rose Hill Plantation property of 1880 acres was a wedding gift from James Brown Kirk to his eldest daughter, Caroline in 1838. Construction on the plantation house began in 1858. During these years, the Kirk family profited from the labor and talent of enslaved people who grew cotton, rice, and indigo on the land. Rice and cotton were the primary cash crops, and salt was harvested from the nearby brackish creeks.

Sometime during the early years of the American Civil War, the Kirks had to flee to nearby Grahamville when word came of Sherman's Union troop movement in the area. Union troops did camp on the grounds, as evidenced by words scratched on the mirror that hung in the entryway: ”J.W. Co E ..... 115th NY ..... Flee Rebels ..... Hell is here ..... 12 July 1863 ". Civil war bullets and other period artifacts have been dug from the acreage in the last few years.

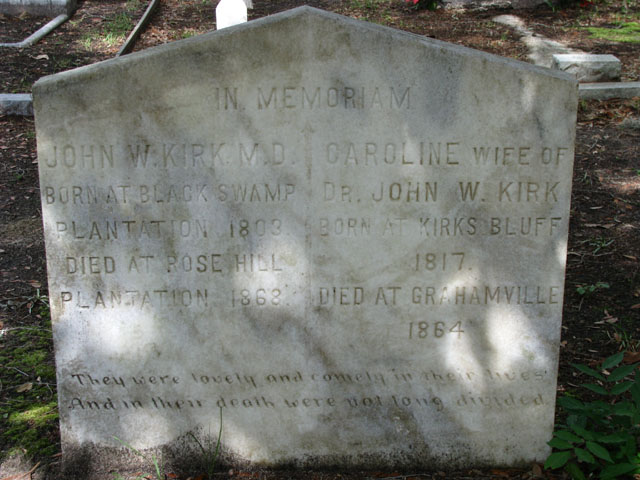
Tombstone for Dr. John Kirk and Caroline Kirk

Caroline Kirk died in Grahamville in June 1864, but Dr. Kirk moved back to Rose Hill by 1866, along with his son William and brother in law Clarence Kirk. The Kirks attempted to plant crops once again, but never realized the wealth and prosperity of those years before the war. After the war, family letters indicate that the Kirks were in dire economic straits. Many of their former slaves who had tended the crops had run away and others (freedmen) who had remained for wages now refused to work. Dr. Kirk died in 1868, with his two children Emily and William inheriting the plantation. They were able to retain Rose Hill in the Kirk name until the early part of the 20th century.

During the ensuing years, the house sat hidden in the woods for long periods abandoned to the elements, while tenant farmers lived in the house during some of those years.

In 1946, John and Betsy Gould Sturgeon, III, purchased the house, situated on the remaining 1400 acres, and employed prominent architect Willis Irvin Sr, to direct the renovation of the house into an elegant home. Irvin stayed “within the original style in his additions” and the finished interior reflected the sophisticated taste of Mrs. Sturgeon.

Betsy Gould Sturgeon died in 1966. After John Sturgeon's death in 1978, the estate was purchased, in 1981, by The Rose Hill Plantation Development Co., a joint venture of the Welton Corporation and Ontario Properties. The company developed Rose Hill Plantation into a gated community of approximately 950 residential home sites that vary in size from patio lots to multi-acre tracts, an Equestrian Center, a golf course, and many amenities for the use of its residents. The plantation house was a showplace and focal point of this development.

Under the supervision of Mrs. Iva Roberts Welton, Director of Rose Hill Plantation House, a rehabilitation of the house was completed in 1985. The plantation house was open for tours by reservation and many social events were held. In 1983, due mainly to the intense efforts of Mrs. Welton, the Rose Hill Plantation house was listed in the National Register of Historic Places.

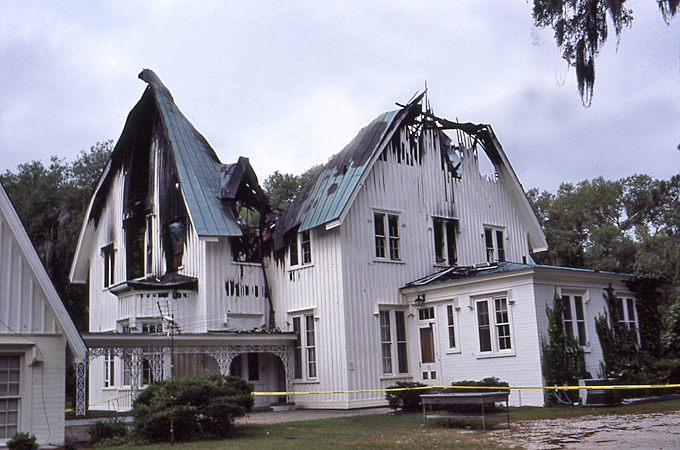
Rose Hill Fire Damage - view from rear of house

Shortly thereafter it suffered extensive damage by a fire. The copper roof, porch, entryway and stairs were restored to preserve the beautiful outer shell and entrance, but the extensive damage to the house interior made the house uninhabitable, and it sat a charred, empty hull until 1996. The few original heart of pine floors on the lower floor that were not destroyed by the fire were damaged severely and would require extensive repair. The few walls downstairs that were not completely destroyed were scorched and paint was peeling from any intact wood. Only one mantel (in the dining room) survived at all and most of the huge doors, though heavily scorched, had been saved. The chimneys had collapsed so none of the fireplaces were repairable. In 1996, the Middleton White Foundation purchased the house and the surrounding 12.5 acres and began a new era of restoration on the house as a private home.

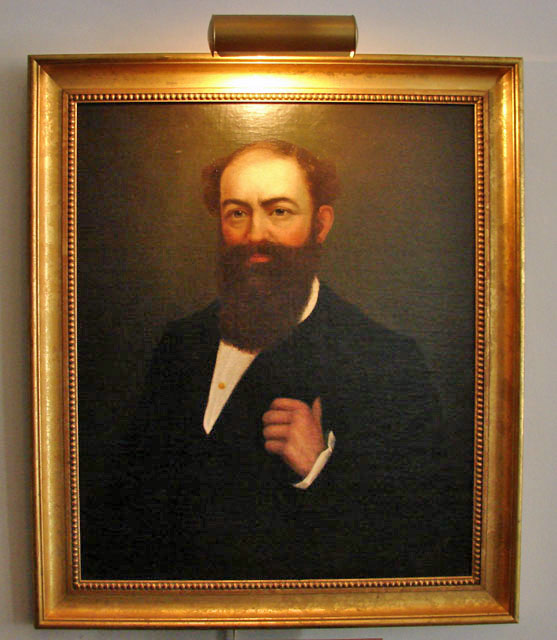
Portrait of Dr. John Kirk donated by direct descendant, Kathryn Kirk

It also is a local historical home that features multiple rooms filled with curated antiques. The property can be used for events, gathering, weddings and luxury nightly rental stays.

== Architecture ==
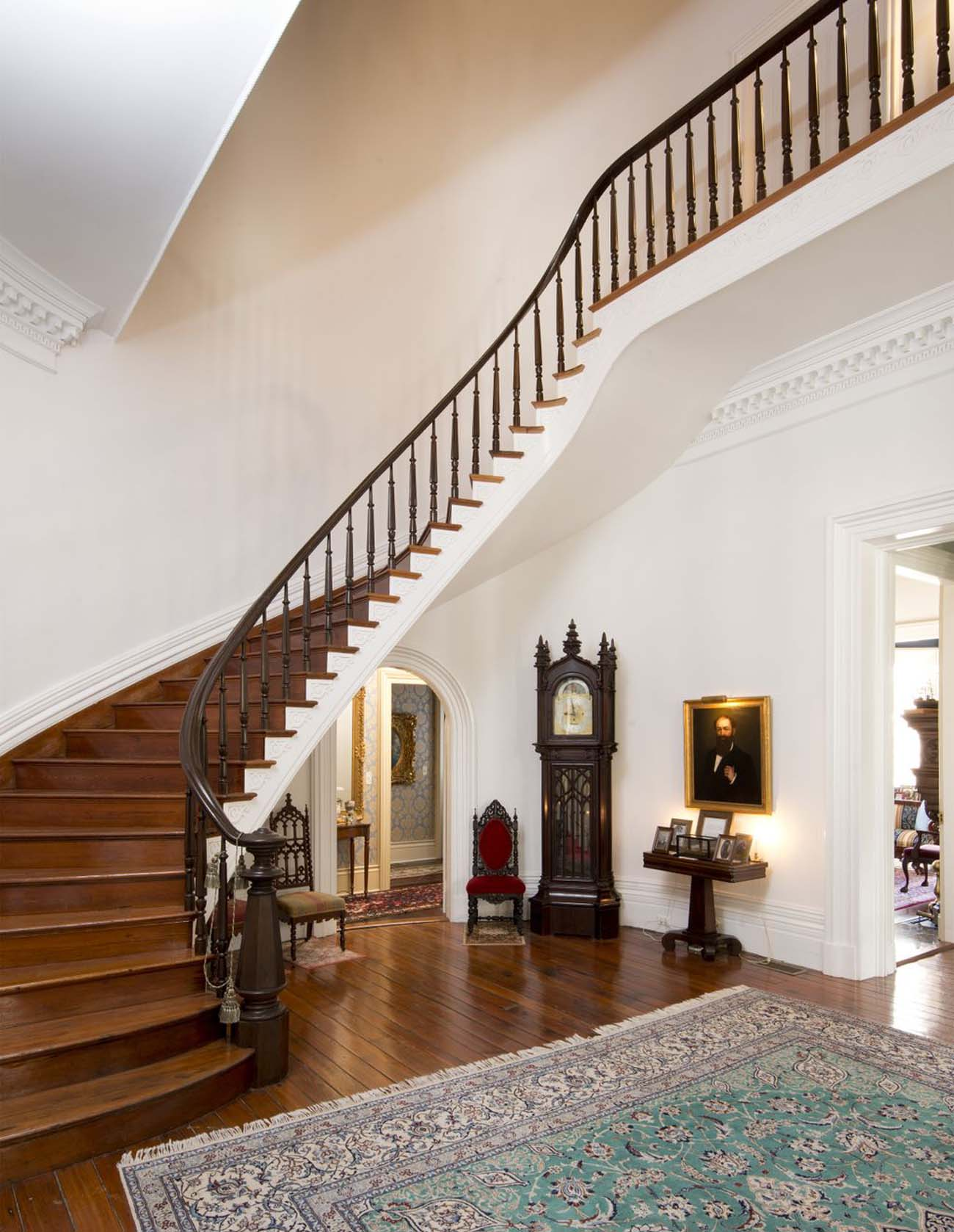
Rose Hill Entryway

According to The National Register of Historic Places:

Rose Hill, on the Colleton River in Beaufort County, South Carolina, is a two-story, frame, cruciform, Gothic Revival building with a brick foundation, vertical board-and-batten siding, and a steeply pitched gable roof sheathed in standing-seam metal [copper]. The façade (south elevation) has a projecting arm of the cruciform plan composed of a first-story porch and a second-story porch room. [This second-story porch was destroyed by the fire, but the fourteen-foot Gothic double windows/door remain intact]. The interior has a cruciform plan arranged around a central domed stair-hall which is oval-shaped and has an open-stringer staircase rising at the north end of the hall and following the curve of the call to the second-floor gallery. An elliptical dome rises above the hall with a chandelier suspended from the dome’s apex. Rose Hill is significant as an exceptional example of antebellum Gothic Revival residential architecture. The renovations have painstakingly preserved most of the original fabric and matched all new construction to the style of the house. The details of Rose Hill are integrated in a highly sophisticated manner, and exhibits extraordinary craftsmanship, with the interior millwork being of exceptional note. The combination of Gothic Revival and classical details, as at Rose Hill, was not unknown in the mid-nineteenth century.

The 1996 renovations developed a third floor storage area and a fourth floor (above the entry dome that contains two art studios/storage on either side of the small foyer. A covered walkway on the northeast corner of the house leads to a guest cottage which has a steep gable roof and windows similar to those of the main house. The kitchen and laundry room at the rear of the house that was adding during the Sturgeon years has been completely renovated and updated with period-looking modern appliances.
