= Rose Hill (Nashville, North Carolina) =

Historic house in North Carolina, United States

- U.S. National Register of Historic Places
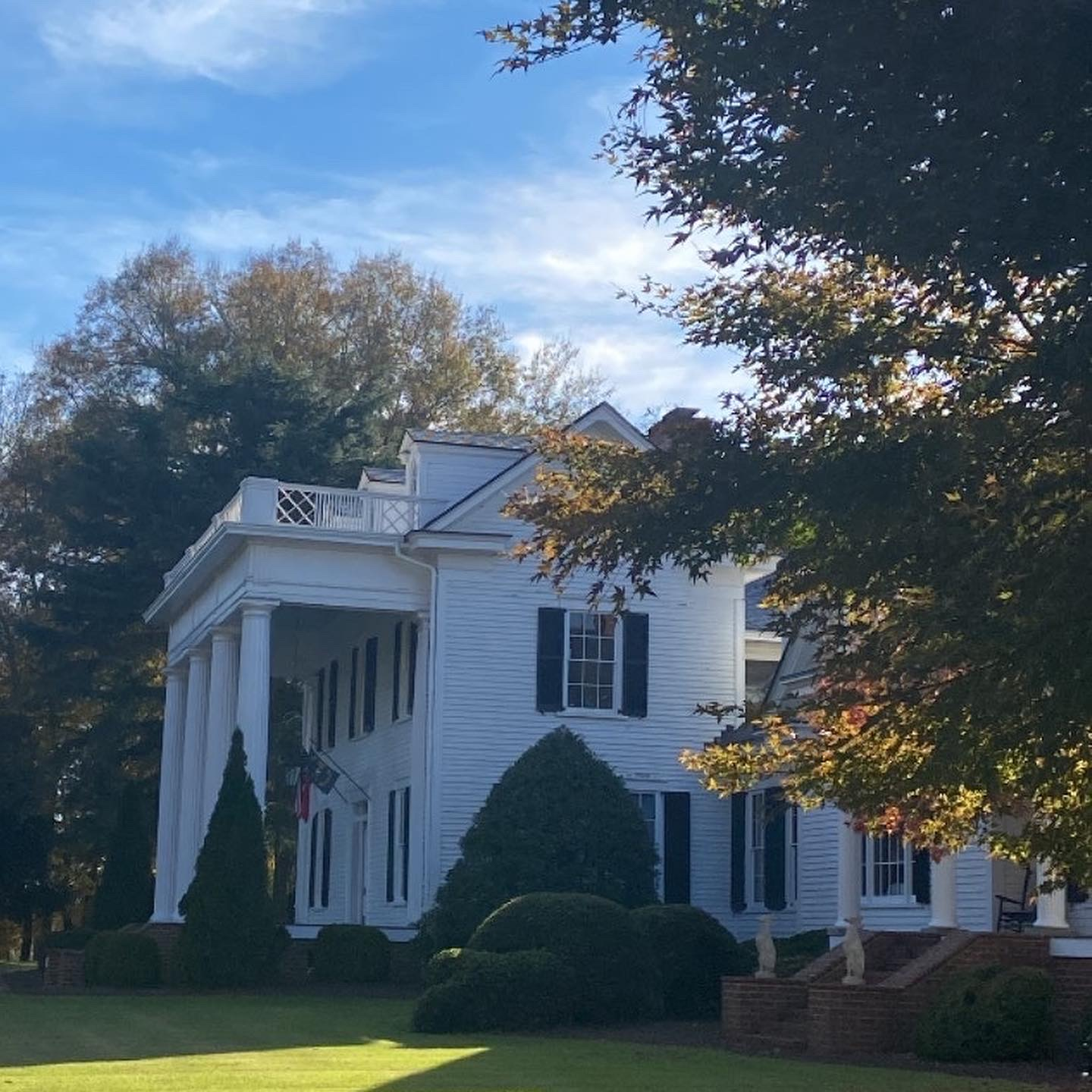
- Rose Hill in November 2021

- Location within North Carolina Location within the United States
- Location: N of Nashville off NC 58, near Nashville, North Carolina
- Coordinates: 36°0′4″N 78°1′31″W
- Area: 1.5 acres (0.61 ha)
- Architectural style: Late Victorian, Influence
- NRHP reference No.: 82003492
- Added to NRHP: April 28, 1982

Rose Hill is a historic plantation house located near Nashville, Nash County, North Carolina. It consists of a late-18th or early-19th century dwelling with a Victorian addition. The earlier section comprises the 1 1/2-story, rear wing. The Victorian section is a basically square two-story structure, three bays wide, topped by a gable roof. The front facade features an early-20th century, two-story portico with fluted Doric order columns.

It was listed on the National Register of Historic Places in 1982.

== History ==
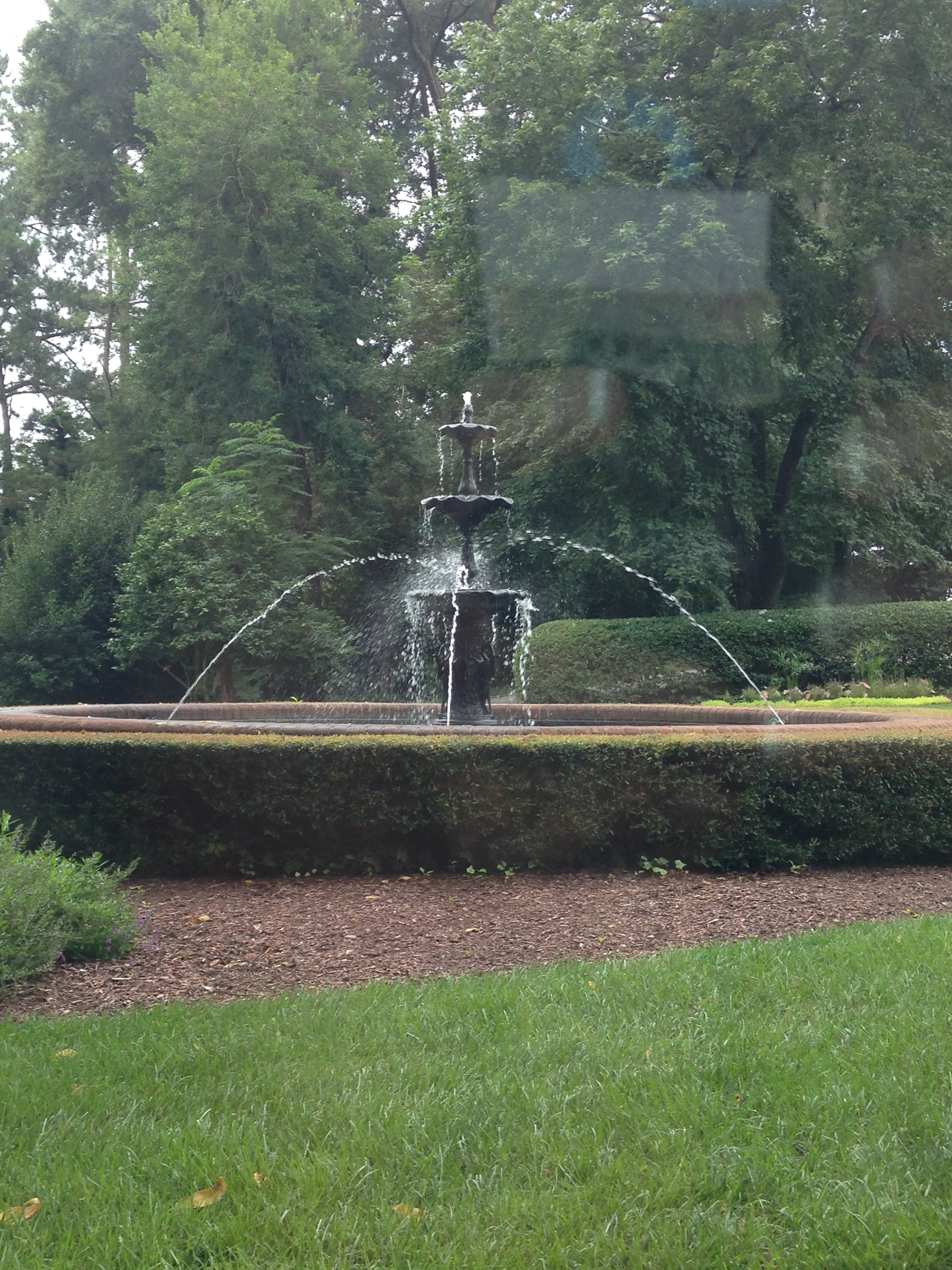
Fountain in the front park at Rose Hill in August 2014

Rose Hill was given in a land grant from George III to the Boddie family in 1762. Nathan Boddie, one of the founders of Nash County, built a manor house on the land for his son, George Boddie, in the late 18th-century. George Boddie owned the property between 1797 and 1842. He left the plantation and 50 enslaved people under the direction of his second wife, Lucy Williams, until his son, Nicholas William Boddie, was of age. Nicholas was likely responsible for the large Victorian additions to the manor house.

The plantation consisted of the manor house, a 9,400 acre-farm, and a mill. In 1790, Nathan and George Boddie enslaved forty-five people on the plantation. In 1840, George Boddie enslaved eighty-two people at Rose Hill. In 1860, Nicholas William Boddie enslaved twenty-seven people.

Rose Hill now operates as a wedding venue and 830-acre working cattle farm, still owned by the Boddie family.
