= Rose Hill (Grassy Creek, North Carolina) =

Historic farm in North Carolina, United States

- U.S. National Register of Historic Places
- U.S. Historic district
- Location within North Carolina Location within the United States
- Location: NC 1442, near Grassy Creek, North Carolina
- Coordinates: 36°31′20″N 78°36′35″W
- Area: 50 acres (20 ha)
- Built: 1834
- Architectural style: Greek Revival
- MPS: Granville County MPS
- NRHP reference No.: 88000415
- Added to NRHP: April 28, 1988

Rose Hill is a historic tobacco plantation house and national historic district located near Grassy Creek, Granville County, North Carolina. The house was built about 1834, and is a two-story, three bay by two bay, Greek Revival-style red brick dwelling. It has a low hipped roof and a Colonial Revival-style front porch added in the late-19th or early-20th century. Also on the property are the contributing garage, two frame corn cribs, four log tobacco barns, a log striphouse, a frame packhouse, and a tenant house.

It was listed on the National Register of Historic Places in 1988.
