= Waltersville, Mississippi =

- Unincorporated community
- Location within Mississippi Location within the United States
- Coordinates: 32°22′47″N 90°52′04″W
- Country: United States
- State: Mississippi
- County: Warren
- Time zone: UTC-6 (Central (CST))
  - Summer (DST): UTC-5 (CDT)
- GNIS feature ID: 679314

Waltersville is an unincorporated community in Warren County, Mississippi, United States.
