= List of Carnegie libraries in Illinois =

The following list of Carnegie libraries in Illinois provides detailed information on United States Carnegie libraries in Illinois, where 106 public libraries were built from 105 grants (totaling $1,661,200) awarded by the Carnegie Corporation of New York from 1903 to 1914. In addition, a second list of academic libraries that were built at five institutions (totaling $90,000) is listed below.

== Key ==
Building still operating as a library
Building standing, but now serving another purpose
Building no longer standing
Building listed on the National Register of Historic Places
Building contributes to a historic district on the National Register of Historic Places

== Carnegie libraries ==
	Library	City or town	Image	Date granted	Grant amount	Location	Notes
1	Aledo	Aledo		May 21, 1913	$10,000	200 N. College Ave.	In June 1974, the Mercer Carnegie Library was one of two buildings in Aledo named “Landmarks in Mercer County” by the Historic Sites Division of the Illinois Department of Conservation. Closed as a library in April 2019 upon opening of new location.
2	Arcola	Arcola		Mar 27, 1903	$10,000	407 E. Main St.	
3	Aurora	Aurora		Jan 16, 1901	$50,000	1 E. Benton St.	Opened 22 Aug 1904, extensively altered in 1969, closed 23 May 2015
4	Beardstown	Beardstown		Jan 22, 1903	$10,000	105 W. 3rd St.	Now city hall
5	Belleville	Belleville		Aug 11, 1913	$45,000	121 E. Washington St.	Dedicated 20 Jan 1916
6	Belvidere	Belvidere		Apr 8, 1910	$17,500	320 N. State St.	Constructed in 1912 and opened to the public in February 1913. A 15,000 square foot expansion was added in 1987.
7	Blue Island	Blue Island		Mar 14, 1902	$15,000		Open 1903–1970
8	Brookfield	Brookfield	Red brick Carnegie library building, Brookfield, IL	Apr 3, 1912	$10,000	3609 Grand Boulevard	Opened June 27, 1914. An annex added in 1958 and the building was demolished in 1985 when a new facility was built. On July 31, 2021, the new Linda Sokol Francis Brookfield Library opened across the street at 3541 Park Avenue. The original Carnegie library site currently serves as the Library's parking lot and Pollinator Garden. The concrete "Public Library" sign from the Carnegie library has been installed in the garden.
9	Carmi	Carmi		Jan 14, 1914	$10,000	203 N. Church St.	Now a genealogy library
10	Carrollton	Carrollton		Oct 3, 1901	$10,000	509 S. Main St.	
11	Centralia	Centralia		Feb 14, 1901	$20,000	515 E. Broadway	
12	Charleston	Charleston		Oct 3, 1901	$15,000	712 6th St.	Opened 15 Jan 1904
13	Chicago Heights	Chicago Heights		Mar 14, 1902	$15,000	1627 Halsted St.	Open 1903–1972, demolished 1974
14	Chillicothe	Chillicothe		Apr 19, 1915	$10,000	822 N. 2nd St.	
15	Danville (Main)	Danville		Dec 21, 1901	$65,000	307 N. Vermillion St.	Now a museum
16	Danville Veterans Branch	Danville		Dec 21, 1901	—		Part of Danville Branch, National Home for Disabled Volunteer Soldiers Historic District
17	Decatur	Decatur		Feb 6, 1901	$60,000		Demolished 1970
18	DeLand	De Land		Apr 25, 1911	$8,000	130 N. Highway Ave.	Open 1912–2009
19	Delavan	Delavan		Apr 28, 1913	$10,000	208 Locust St.	
20	Des Plaines	Des Plaines		Apr 10, 1906	$5,000		Open 1907-1936
21	Downers Grove	Downers Grove		Feb 13, 1906	$8,500		Was completely surrounded by an addition in 1956, Demolished 1975
22	Edwardsville	Edwardsville		Feb 12, 1903	$12,500	112 S. Kansas St.	
23	El Paso	El Paso		Sep 1, 1905	$6,000	149 W. 1st St. 40°44′22″N 89°01′07″W	
24	Evanston	Evanston		Dec 14, 1903	$50,000		Open 1907–1960
25	Farmington	Farmington		Jan 29, 1906	$5,600	266 E. Fort St.	
26	Flora	Flora		Feb 20, 1903	$10,000		Open 1903–1990
27	Freeport	Freeport		Feb 21, 1901	$30,000	314 W. Stephenson St.	Open 1902–2004
28	Fulton	Fulton		Dec 14, 1908	$5,000	501 10th Ave.	Opened 27 Oct 1909
29	Galena	Galena		Apr 20, 1905	$12,500	601 S. Bench St.	Dedicated 4 July 1908. Part of Galena National Register Historic District
30	Galesburg	Galesburg		Feb 14, 1901	$50,000		Opened 1902, burned 9 May 1958
31	Galva	Galva		Feb 10, 1908	$8,000	120 NW 3rd Ave.	Opened July 1910
32	Geneva	Geneva		Jan 23, 1907	$7,500	127 James St.	Opened 1908
33	Gilman	Gilman		Sep 29, 1915	$10,000	117 E. 2nd St.	Open 1916–2002
34	Glen Ellyn	Glen Ellyn		May 17, 1912	$10,000	671 Crescent Blvd.	Open 1914–1995, extensively altered, now school district offices
35	Grayville	Grayville		May 16, 1911	$6,000	110 W. Mill St.	Open 1912–2010. Razed sometime between 2021 and 2024.
36	Greenup	Greenup		Jan 27, 1904	$8,000	101 N. Mill St.	Now a museum
37	Greenville	Greenville		Apr 23, 1903	$11,000	414 W. Main St.	
38	Griggsville	Griggsville		Apr 19, 1915	$5,000	119 S. Corey St.	Opened 1916
39	Harrisburg	Harrisburg		Mar 21, 1908	$12,500	101 E. Church St.	Open 1909–2000, now a church
40	Harvey	Harvey		Feb 1, 1905	$13,500	155th St. and Turlington Ave.	Open 1906–1971
41	Havana	Havana		Oct 3, 1900	$8,000	201 W. Adams St.	Opened 1902
42	Highland Park	Highland Park		Mar 27, 1903	$12,000		Demolished 1929
43	Hillsboro	Hillsboro		Nov 25, 1903	$11,000	214 School St.	
44	Hoopeston	Hoopeston		Feb 12, 1903	$12,500	110 N. 4th St.	Opened 1905
45	Jacksonville	Jacksonville		Feb 6, 1901	$40,000	201 W. College Ave.	
46	Jerseyville	Jerseyville		Apr 11, 1902	$12,000	105 N. Liberty St.	Opened 1904
47	Kewanee	Kewanee		Mar 14, 1901	$25,000	102 S. Tremont St.	Opened 1908
48	La Grange	La Grange		Mar 27, 1903	$12,500		Open 1905–1968
49	La Harpe	La Harpe		Dec 20, 1904	$5,000	209 E. Main St.	Opened 1906
50	LaSalle	LaSalle		Jun 2, 1904	$25,000	305 Marquette St.	Opened 19 Jan 1907, designed by Chicago architect Victor Andre Matteson
51	Lewistown	Lewistown		Dec 16, 1905	$5,400	321 W. Lincoln Ave.	
52	Lincoln	Lincoln		Mar 6, 1901	$25,000	725 Pekin St.	
53	Litchfield	Litchfield		Jan 6, 1903	$15,000	400 N. State St.	Tourism Office and Chamber of Commerce
54	Macomb	Macomb		Apr 13, 1903	$15,000	235 S. Lafayette St.	Opened 1904
55	Marion	Marion		Feb 13, 1909	$18,000	206 S. Market St.	Opened 29 Feb 1916
56	Marseilles	Marseilles		Jun 2, 1904	$10,000	155 E. Bluff St.	Opened 23 Nov 1905
57	Mattoon	Mattoon		Jun 21, 1901	$25,000	1600 Charleston Ave.	Opened 1903
58	Maywood	Maywood		Aug 19, 1904	$12,500	121 S. 5th Ave.	Opened 31 Mar 1906
59	Mendota	Mendota		Jan 14, 1904	$10,000	901 Washington St.	Now a museum
60	Metropolis	Metropolis		Jan 27, 1912	$9,000	317 Metropolis St.	Dedicated 27 Nov 1915
61	Milford	Milford		Dec 30, 1904	$7,000	2 S. Grant Ave.	
62	Moline	Moline		Aug 16, 1901	$40,000	504 17th St.	Open 1903–2008
63	Morris	Morris		Jan 6, 1912	$12,500	604 Liberty St.	Open 1913–1970, replaced on the same site
64	Mount Carmel	Mount Carmel		Apr 10, 1909	$15,000	120 E 5th St	Currently in use as an attorney's office. In use as a Library until 1970
65	Mount Carroll	Mount Carroll		Jan 19, 1905	$11,000	208 N. Main St.	
66	Mount Vernon	Mount Vernon		Mar 27, 1903	$15,000	101 S. 7th St.	Opened 1905
67	Olney	Olney		Jan 6, 1903	$11,500	401 E. Main St.	Now a museum
68	Onarga	Onarga		Dec 13, 1906	$5,000	209 W. Seminary Ave.	Opened 1907
69	Oregon	Oregon		Apr 20, 1905	$10,000	300 Jefferson St.	Designed by Pond and Pond.
70	Pana	Pana		Jan 31, 1911	$14,000	303 E. 2nd St.	
71	Paris	Paris		Mar 14, 1902	$18,000	207 S. Main St.	
72	Park Ridge	Park Ridge		Dec 2, 1909	$7,500	1 N. Northwest Hwy.	Open 1913–1957, now a beauty salon. Designed by Pond and Pond.
73	Paxton	Paxton		Mar 20, 1903	$10,000	254 S. Market St.	
74	Pekin	Pekin		Aug 8, 1900	$17,500		Open 1902–1972, demolished 1974
75	Peoria Lincoln Branch	Peoria		Dec 13, 1909	$20,000	1312 W. Lincoln Ave.	Renovated and a 12,000 foot addition was constructed on the rear of the building in 2013.
76	Peru	Peru		Apr 8, 1910	$15,000	Putnam St.	Open 1910–1986
77	Petersburg	Petersburg		Dec 13, 1906	$8,000	220 S. 6th St.	
78	Pittsfield	Pittsfield		Nov 24, 1905	$7,500	205 N. Memorial St.	
79	Plano	Plano		Dec 20, 1904	$10,250	15 W. North St.	
80	Polo	Polo		Apr 13, 1903	$10,000	302 W. Mason St.	
81	Ridge Farm	Ridge Farm		Apr 28, 1909	$9,000	104 N. State St.	
82	Robinson	Robinson		Aug 6, 1904	$11,000	301 E. Main St.	Open 1906-1976
83	Rochelle	Rochelle		Apr 25, 1911	$10,000	619 4th Ave.	
84	Rockford	Rockford		Mar 6, 1901	$70,000	215 N. Wyman St.	Was completely surrounded by a 1967 addition; demolished in 2018
85	Rushville	Rushville		Feb 13, 1906	$7,500	104 N. Monroe St.	
86	Savanna	Savanna		Apr 23, 1903	$11,350	326 3rd St.	
87	Sheffield	Sheffield		May 2, 1911	$4,000	136 E. Cook St.	
88	Shelbyville	Shelbyville		Jan 22, 1903	$10,000	154 N. Broadway	
89	Sheldon	Sheldon		Jun 1, 1915	$9,000	125 N. 5th St.	
90	Spring Valley	Spring Valley		Jan 27, 1912	$15,000	215 E. Cleveland St.	
91	Springfield	Springfield		Mar 8, 1901	$75,000		Demolished in 1974
92	St. Charles	St. Charles		Dec 13, 1906	$12,500	1 S. 6th Ave.	
93	Sterling	Sterling		Jan 2, 1903	$17,500	102 W. 3rd St.	
94	Streator	Streator		Feb 19, 1901	$35,000	130 S. Park St.	
95	Sycamore	Sycamore		Jan 13, 1903	$12,000	103 E. State St.	
96	Taylorville	Taylorville		Mar 27, 1903	$14,000	222 W. Market St.	Opened 1904, now a law office
97	Toulon	Toulon		Jul 23, 1914	$6,000	306 W. Jefferson St.	
98	Tuscola	Tuscola		Apr 13, 1903	$10,000	112 E. Sale St.	
99	Vienna	Vienna		Jan 20, 1908	$6,000	401 Poplar St.	
100	Warren	Warren		Aug 17, 1910	$7,000	210 Burnett Ave.	
101	Waterman	Waterman		Jan 31, 1913	$3,500	110 S. Elm St.	
102	Waukegan	Waukegan		Mar 20, 1903	$27,500	1 N. Sheridan Rd.	Open 1903–1965
103	Waverly	Waverly		May 16, 1911	$4,500	291 N. Pearl St.	
104	Wilmette	Wilmette		Mar 20, 1903	$11,000		Open 1905–1951
105	Winchester	Winchester		Feb 10, 1908	$7,500	215 N. Main St.	
106	Wyoming	Wyoming		Nov 3, 1913	$5,600	119 N. 7th St.	

== Academic libraries ==
	Institution	Locality	Image	Year granted	Grant amount	Location	Notes
1	Ewing College	Ewing		Mar 12, 1906	$10,000		
2	Monmouth College	Monmouth		Sep 1, 1905	$30,000	800 block of East Broadway	Now Poling Hall, houses the business, dean of students, and registrar offices and the career center
3	North-Western College	Naperville		Apr 18, 1905	$25,000		Now Carnegie Hall, houses the computer science department at North Central College
4	Shurtleff College	Upper Alton		Mar 2, 1907	$15,000		Now the biomedical library for Southern Illinois University School of Dental Medicine
5	University of Chicago	Chicago		Nov 7, 1907	$10,000	1116 E. 59th St.	Andrew Carnegie was one of many donors to the William Rainey Harper Memorial Library which opened June 11, 1912.

== See also ==
- Illinois Carnegie Libraries Multiple Property Submission
- List of libraries in the United States
