= Illinois Carnegie Libraries Multiple Property Submission =

- Illinois Carnegie Libraries MPS
- U.S. National Register of Historic Places
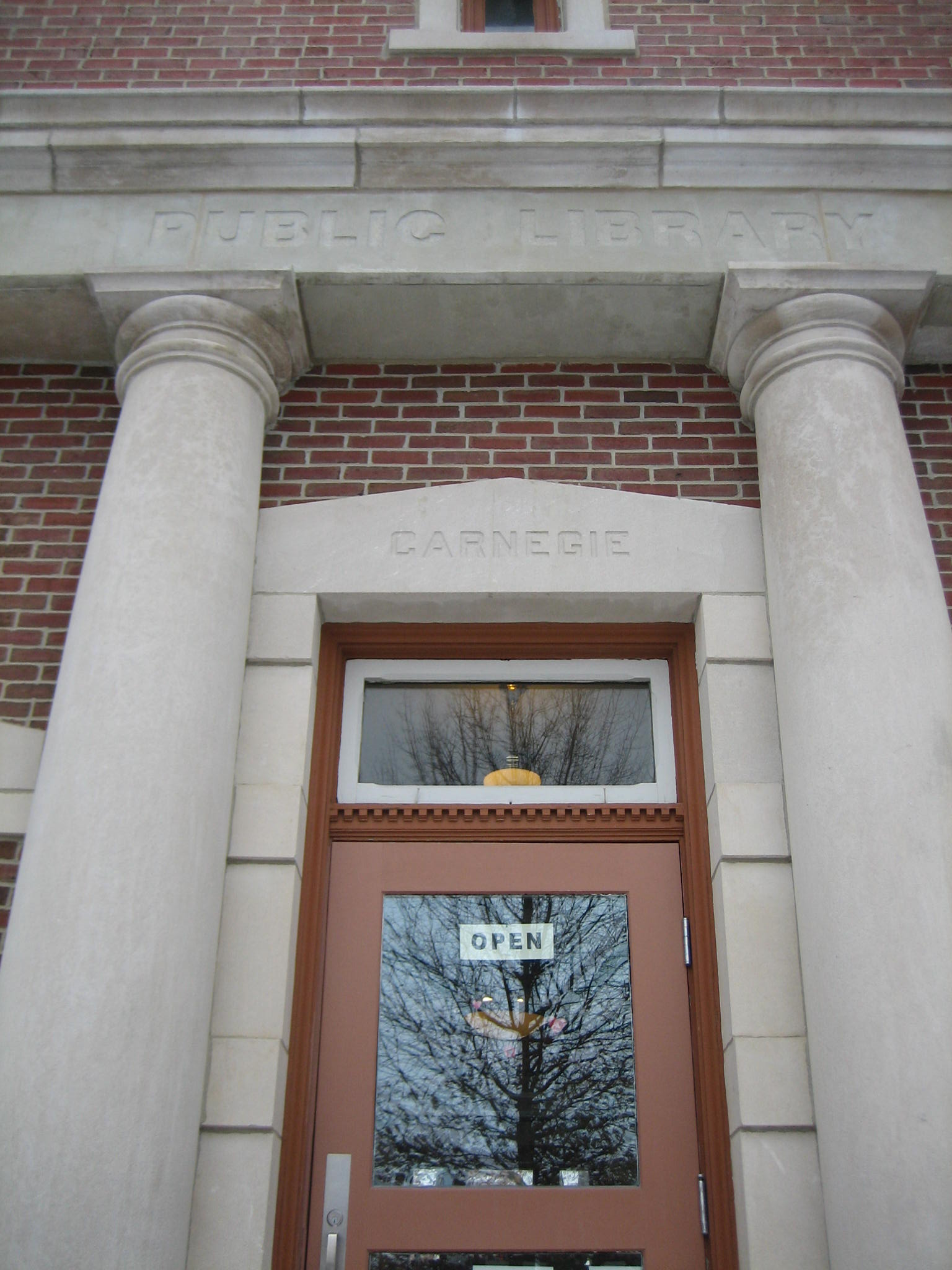
- Buffalo Township Public Library in Polo, Illinois.
- Location: Illinois, USA
- Built: Various
- Architect: Normand Smith Patton, Grant Miller, Paul O. Moratz, William A. Otis, Pond and Pond, John Grant Beadle, Louis Ward Claude and Edward F. Starck, Clifford Shopbell.
- Architectural style: Romanesque Revival, Classical Revival, Arts & Crafts
- MPS: MPL015 - Illinois Carnegie Libraries Multiple Property Submission
- NRHP reference No.: 64500205
- Added to NRHP: February 16, 1994

Illinois Carnegie Libraries Multiple Property Submission was a National Register of Historic Places Multiple Property Submission in the U.S. state of Illinois, approved on February 16, 1994. The submission included a group of sixteen Illinois libraries whose construction was funded by early 20th century philanthropist Andrew Carnegie. The sixteen libraries were all added to the National Register of Historic Places between 1978 and 2002.

== Context ==
Carnegie, a business mogul, donated roughly $40,000,000 to library construction in the late 19th and early 20th centuries. Disseminated in the form of grants, Illinois received 106 such grants, the third highest total nationwide. In addition to the 106 community libraries Carnegie helped create he also provided funding for four state university libraries in Illinois. The Carnegie Library, in Illinois and nationwide, represents a significant period in the history of the American public library, which is part of the very social history that threads its way through the American past. Collectively the buildings of the Illinois Carnegie Library Multiple Property Submission come from a time period when Americans were beginning to demand the library as a necessary public institution and the library was altering the way society functioned. Taxes were instituted in towns across the country in order to support public libraries and, perhaps much less noticeable, library design began to change to meet differing needs. In all 1,679 libraries were built with the help of Carnegie funding.

== History ==
Between the years 1886 and 1919 Andrew Carnegie gave away $56 million worldwide in library benefactions. There are two main divisions within those years, often described as "retail" and "wholesale," based upon the number of libraries constructed. For the first ten years of his philanthropy Carnegie donated around $1,000,000 which benefacted only six communities in the United States and constructed a total of 14 library buildings. Those years, 1886-1896 are described as the "retail" years. The retail philanthropy was limited to five Pennsylvania communities, Pittsburgh, Allegheny, Johnstown, Braddock and Homestead, and one town in Iowa, Fairfield.

As Carnegie went from his retail to wholesale period of library funding he refined his philanthropical philosophy. Instead of providing funding for large, multi-purpose buildings in larger urban areas he began to focus on providing more and smaller locales with libraries, communities that may not have had much in the way of cultural institutions before Carnegie's benefaction.

== Libraries ==
As it became obvious in the late 1880s that Carnegie intended to give away a portion of his wealth, communities, including those in Illinois, began to scramble for the grants. Towns across Illinois petitioned Carnegie, who from 1897 delegated responsibility for screening applications to his personal secretary James Bertram. Bertram was the man that municipalities dealt with when trying to obtain a library; he was known as efficient to the point of rudeness.

Though Carnegie funded 106 libraries in Illinois, the Multiple Property Submission included just 17 of those libraries scattered in small towns across the state. The libraries included: Oregon Public Library, Arcola Carnegie Public Library, Ayer Public Library, Buffalo Township Public Library, (in Polo), Danville Public Library, El Paso Public Library, Greenville Public Library, Havana Public Library, Hoopeston Carnegie Public Library, Jacksonville Public Library, Lincoln Public Library, Litchfield Public Library, Olney Carnegie Library, Paris Carnegie Public Library, Paxton Carnegie Public Library, Streator Public Library, and the Vienna Public Library.

Before the construction of the Carnegie libraries the condition of libraries in small town Illinois can be described as poor, at least based on the descriptions in correspondence to Bertram regarding the grants. Littered among the glowing self-reviews of various communities are indications of the state of libraries in communities seeking Carnegie grants. For instance, in Oregon, Illinois, the Oregon Public Library was forced to occupy "undesirable rented rooms," first in a drug store and then later in a bank building. The 12,000 volume library in Havana was housed in a small room in city hall, cluttered among other municipal offices and departments. The accuracy of these statements is hard to know as the communities were vying for competitive grants for new libraries, but the correspondence can give some idea of the condition of libraries around the state prior to the influx of Carnegie's money.

== Other Illinois Carnegie libraries ==
- Flagg Township Public Library
- Sycamore Public Library
- List of Carnegie libraries in Illinois

== See also ==
- Carnegie libraries
