= Patton & Miller =

Historic architecture firm

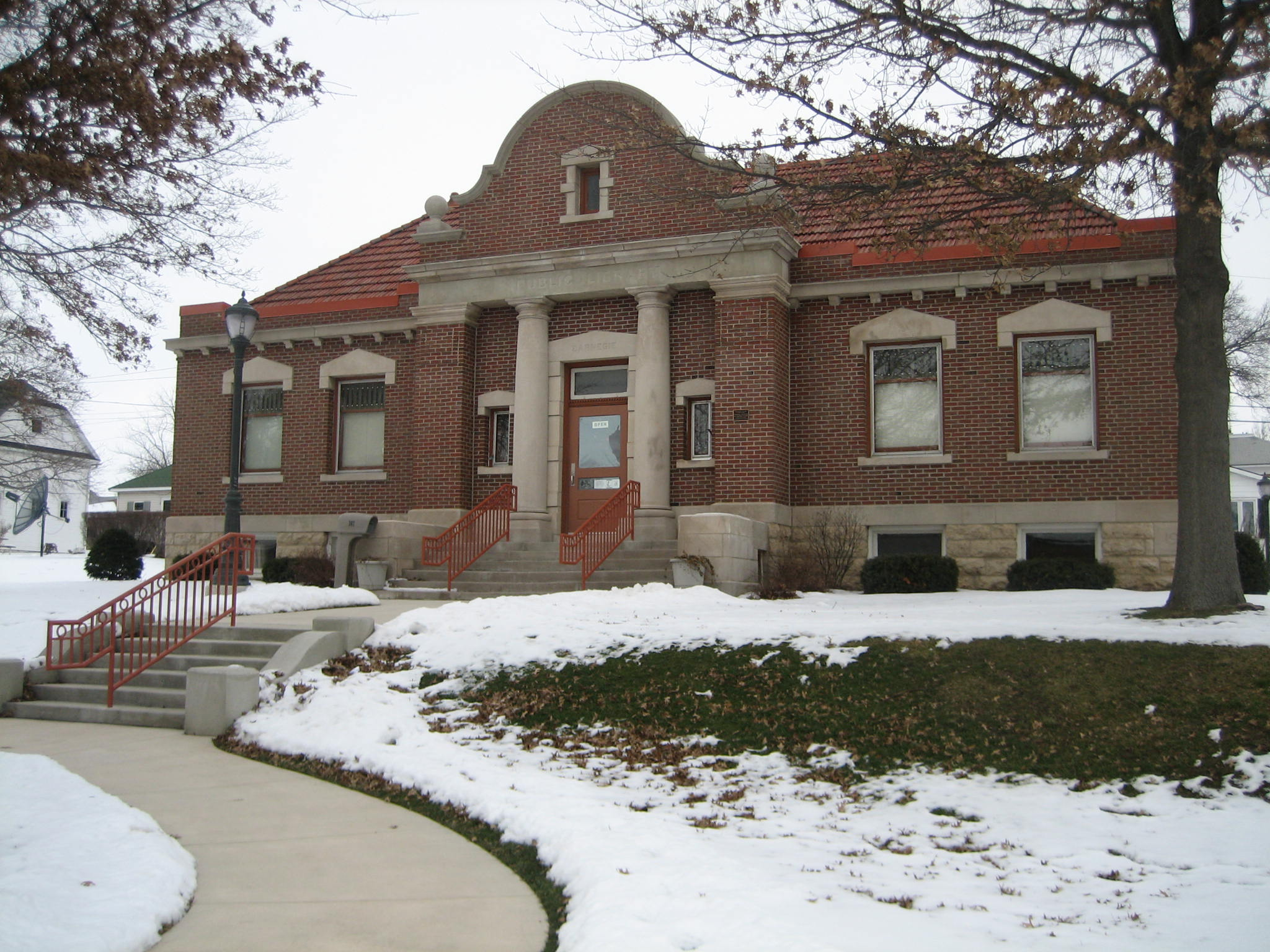
Buffalo Township Public Library

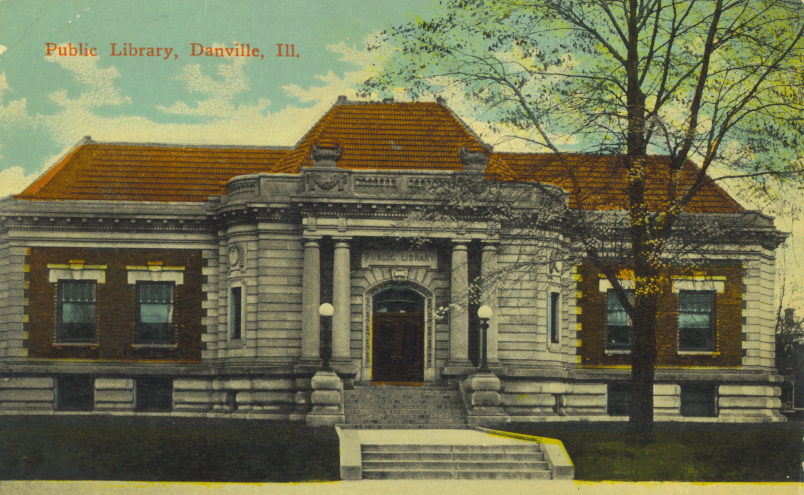
Danville Public Library, circa 1920

Patton & Miller was an architectural firm of Chicago, Illinois. Active from 1901, it was notable for its contribution to library architecture.

Normand Smith Patton had been in partnership with other architects before he went into business with Grant C. Miller. They designed over 100 Carnegie libraries nationwide, including Buffalo Township Public Library and 14 more in Illinois.

They designed numerous buildings which have been preserved and are listed on the National Register of Historic Places.

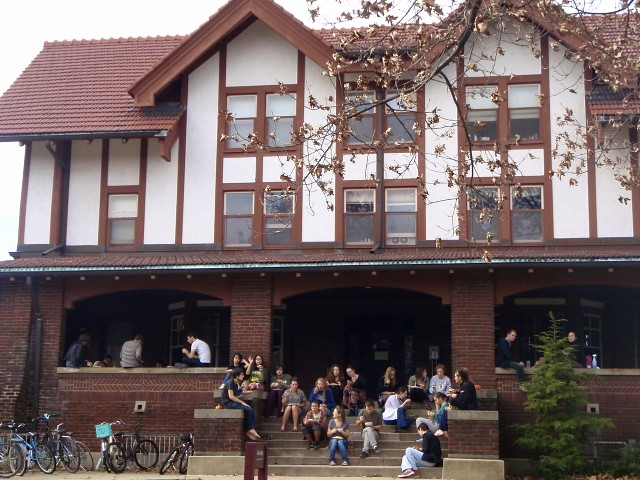
Keep Cottage, in Oberlin, Ohio.

Works (with attribution variations) include:

- Belmonte Flats, Chicago, NRHP-listed
- Bethany Evangelical Lutheran Church Bible Chapel, Chicago (Patton & Miller)
- Illinois Institute of Technology Academic Campus, built in the Romanesque revival architecture style that were designed by Patton & Fisher and their successor firm, Patton, Fisher & Miller
- Spies Public Library
- Peter White Public Library
- Buffalo Township Public Library, 302 W. Mason St. Polo, IL (Patton and Miller), NRHP-listed
- Carnegie Public Library, 125 S. College St. Tyler, TX (Patton & Miller), NRHP-listed
- Carnegie Library, 634 College St., Beloit, Wisconsin (Patton and Miller, 1904), part of Near East Side Historic District
- Chariton Free Public Library, 803 Braden Chariton, IA (Patton & Miller), NRHP-listed
- Chillicothe and Ross County Public Library, 140 S. Paint St. Chillicothe, OH
- Clinton Public Library, 306 8th Ave, S. Clinton, IA (Patton & Miller), NRHP-listed
- Council Bluffs Free Public Library, 200 Pearl St. Council Bluffs, IA (Patton and Miller), NRHP-listed
- Crawfordsville High School, 201 E. Jefferson St. Crawfordsville, IN (Patton & Miller), NRHP-listed
- Danville Public Library, 307 N. Vermillion St. Danville, IL (Patton & Miller), NRHP-listed
- Eau Claire Public Library, 217 S. Farwell St. Eau Claire, WI (Patton & Miller), NRHP-listed
- Eckhart Public Library and Park, 603 S. Jackson St. Auburn, IN (Patton & Miller), NRHP-listed
- Eldora Public Library, 1219 14th Ave. Eldora, IA (Patton & Miller), NRHP-listed
- Elkhart County Courthouse, Courthouse Sq. Goshen, IN (Patton & Miller), NRHP-listed
- Goshen Carnegie Public Library, 202 N. 5th St. Goshen, IN (Patton, Fisher, & Miller of Chica), NRHP-listed
- Thomas A. Hendricks Library, College Dr. (Campus Rd.) Hanover, IN (Patton & Miller), NRHP-listed
- Calvin C. Hill House (1904), 312 N. Euclid Avenue, Oak Park, Illinois (Patton & Miller)
- Jacksonville Public Library (Illinois), 201 W. College Ave. Jacksonville, IL (Patton & Miller), NRHP-listed
- Keep Cottage, 154 North Main St. Oberlin, OH (Patton & Miller), NRHP-listed
- Kendall Young Public Library, 1201 Willson Ave. Webster City, IA (Patton & Miller), NRHP-listed
- Kewanee Public Library, 102 S Tremont Kewanee, IL (Patton and Miller), NRHP-listed
- Laird Hall, 70 Greenfield St. Tiffin, OH (Patton & Miller), NRHP-listed
- Linton Public Library, 110 E. Vincennes St. Linton, IN (Patton & Miller), NRHP-listed
- Lorain Historical Society, Carnegie Center at 329 W 10th St. Lorain, OH (Patton & Miller)
- Mason City Public Library, 208 E. State St. Mason City, IA (Patton & Miller), NRHP-listed
- Mount Pleasant Public Library, 200 N. Main St. Mount Pleasant, IA (Patton & Miller), NRHP-listed
- Onawa Public Library, Iowa Ave. and 7th St. Onawa, IA (Patton & Miller), NRHP-listed
- Oak Park and River Forest High School (1906), 201 N. Scoville Avenue, Oak Park, Illinois (1906 work attributed to Normand S. Patton and Robert C. Spencer; 1908 and 1911 work attributed to Patton & Miller)
- Princeton Public Library, Illinois, (formerly Matson Public Library), 698 E. Peru St. Princeton, IL (Patton & Miller)
- Pfleiderer Center for Religion and the Humanities, 28 Greenfield St. Tiffin, OH (Patton & Miller), NRHP-listed
- Red Oak Public Library, 2nd and Washington Sts. Red Oak, IA (Patton & Miller), NRHP-listed
- Streator Public Library, 130 S. Park St. Streator, IL (Patton & Miller), NRHP-listed
- Vinton Public Library, 510 2nd Ave. Vinton, IA (Patton & Miller of Chicago), NRHP-listed
- Williard Hall, 116 Greenfield St. Tiffin, OH (Patton & Miller), NRHP-listed
- One or more works in Linton Commercial Historic District, roughly bounded by B St. N, 1st St. E, A St. S, 1st St. W Linton, IN (Patton & Miller), NRHP-listed

== See also ==
- Patton & Fisher

== Notes ==
1. Clinton, Iowa architectural firm of Patton & Miller. Beaux Arts Classicism style with a monumental entry with processional steps and flanking paired columns. ...
2. Freeport, Illinois Carnegie Library in Illinois and one of the first Carnegie Libraries designed by the famous Chicago architectural firm of Patton and Miller. ...
3. Illinois Carnegie Libraries Multiple Property Submission
