= Danville Public Library =

Danville Public Library may refer to:

- Danville Public Library (Danville, Illinois), listed on the NRHP in Illinois
- Danville Public Library (Danville, Virginia), listed on the NRHP in Virginia
