= Lincoln Public Library =

Lincoln Public Library may refer to the following libraries in the United States:

in the United States (by state then city)

- Lincoln Public Library (Lincoln, California), listed on the NRHP in Placer County, California
- Lincoln County Library, Lincolnton, Georgia
- Lincoln Public Library (Lincoln, Illinois), listed on the NRHP in Logan County, Illinois
- Lincoln Carnegie Library, Lincoln, Kansas, listed on the NRHP in Lincoln County, Kansas
- Lincoln Public Library (Lincoln, Massachusetts)
- Lincoln City Libraries in Lincoln, Nebraska
