= Clinton Public Library =

- U.S. National Register of Historic Places
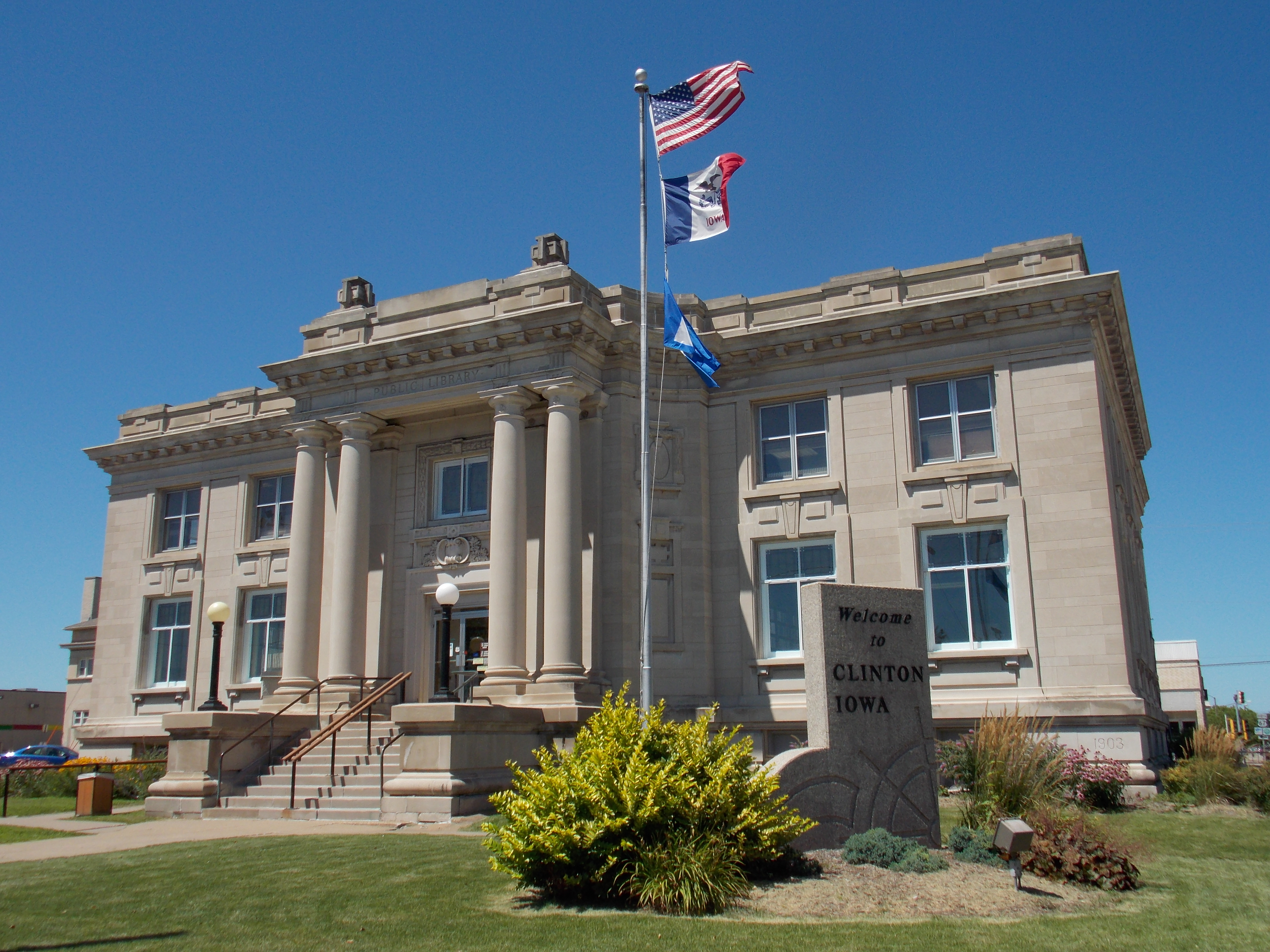

- Location within Iowa Location within the United States
- Location: 306 8th Ave, S. Clinton, Iowa
- Coordinates: 41°50′17″N 90°11′29″W
- Built: 1903-1904
- Architect: Patton & Miller
- Architectural style: Beaux-Arts
- MPS: Public Library Buildings in Iowa TR
- NRHP reference No.: 83000349
- Added to NRHP: May 23, 1983

Clinton Public Library is located in Clinton, Iowa, United States. The main library is located downtown and is listed on the National Register of Historic Places. The Lyons Branch is located on the north side of the city.

== Main Library ==
The main library building was designed by the Chicago architectural firm of Patton & Miller and funded by Andrew Carnegie. The Beaux-Arts style building was constructed by Daniel Haring from 1903 to 1904. It is a two-story structure built on top of a raised basement. The exterior walls are composed of cut and dressed limestone. An addition was built in the rear of the original building and houses the main two-level stack area. A modern canopy was added over the entry at grade level to the basement. It was listed on the National Register of Historic Places in 1983.
