= Kendall Young Public Library =

Library in Webster City, Iowa

Kendall Young Library
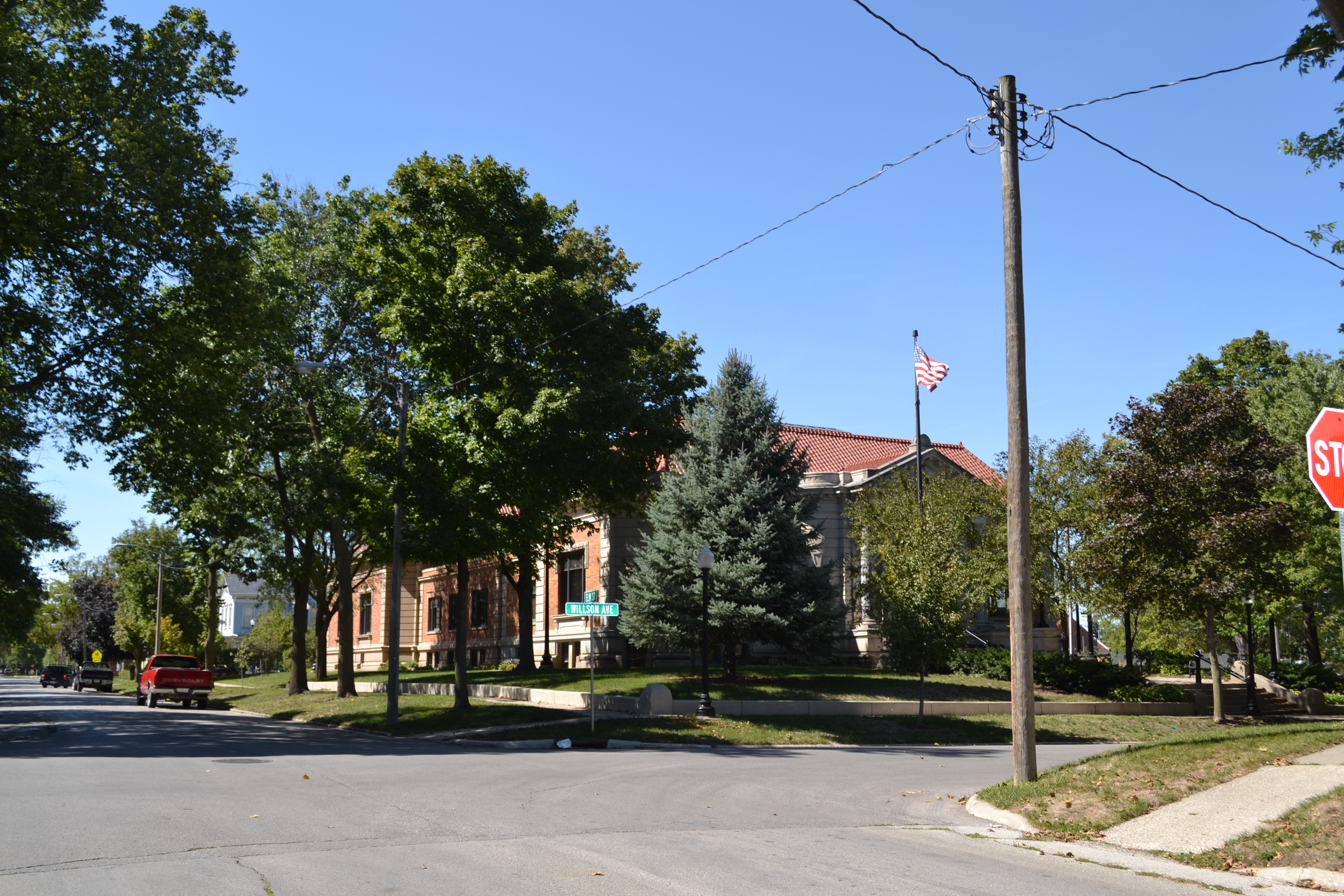
- Location: 1201 Willson Ave. Webster City, Iowa, United States
- Type: Free
- Established: 1896
- Architect: Patton & Miller

Access and use
- Access requirements: Resident of Webster City

Other information
- Website: Website
- Kendall Young Public Library
- U.S. National Register of Historic Places
- Location within Iowa Location within the United States
- Coordinates: 42°27′55″N 93°49′11″W
- Area: less than one acre
- Built: 1916
- Architect: Patton & Miller
- Architectural style: Beaux-Arts
- MPS: Public Library Buildings in Iowa TR
- NRHP reference No.: 83000361
- Added to NRHP: May 23, 1983

The Kendall Young Library is located in Webster City, Iowa, United States. The library was established in 1896 from an endowment left by Kendall Young. The historic building was designed by the Chicago architectural firm of Patton & Miller. The library is an elaborate Beaux-Arts style building. The main facade is largely composed of rusticated masonry. The columns of the portico are of the Ionic order. The delivery room on the interior features a stained glass dome. It was listed on the National Register of Historic Places in 1983.
