= Kewanee Public Library =

- U.S. National Register of Historic Places
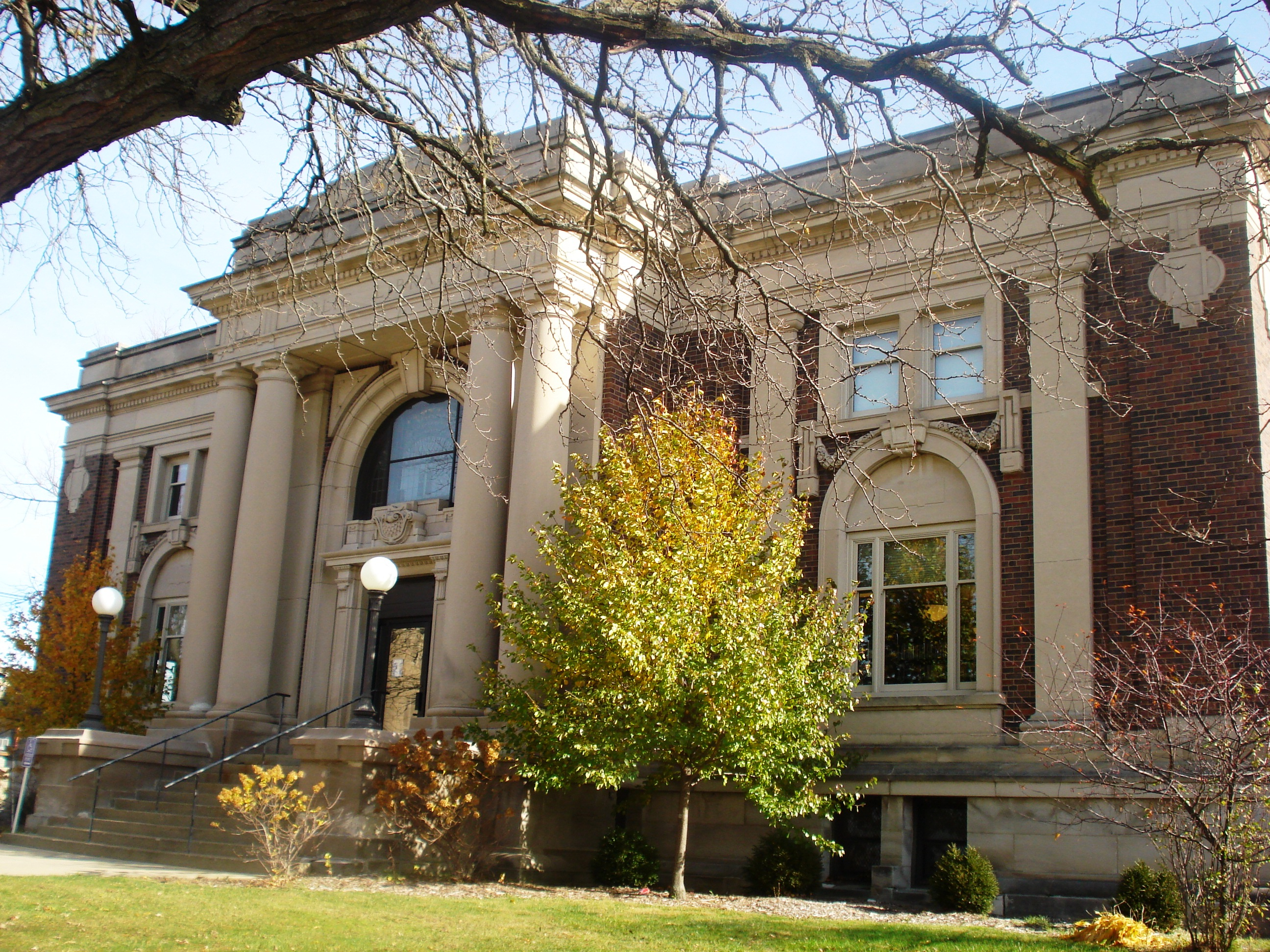

- Location within Illinois Location within the United States
- Location: 102 S. Tremont; Kewanee, Illinois
- Coordinates: 41°14′43″N 89°55′34″W
- Area: less than one acre
- Built: 1907-08
- Built by: Nels Granquist, Peter Swanson
- Architect: Patton and Miller
- Architectural style: Classical Revival
- MPS: Illinois Carnegie Libraries MPS
- NRHP reference No.: 06000447
- Added to NRHP: May 31, 2006

The Kewanee Public Library is a Carnegie library located at 102 South Tremont Street in Kewanee, Illinois. The library was built in 1907–08 to house the city's public library, which was formed in 1875 and had previously occupied a room in the town hall. The city's first attempt at building a Carnegie library came in 1901, but it could not secure funding to match Carnegie's $20,000 grant; later in the decade, it approved additional community funding and convinced Carnegie to supply an additional $5,000. Chicago architects Patton & Miller, who were well known for their work on Carnegie libraries, designed the Classical Revival building. The library's design includes an entrance flanked by four stone columns and topped by a portico, stone pilasters to either side of the front windows, and a classical entablature with a frieze and dentillated cornice.

The library was added to the National Register of Historic Places on May 31, 2006.
