= Council Bluffs Public Library =

Public library in Council Bluffs, Iowa, U.S.

- 41°15′32.3″N 95°50′58.8″W
- Location: 400 Willow Ave, Council Bluffs, Iowa, United States
- Type: Public
- Established: 1866; 160 years ago

Collection
- Size: 186,970

Access and use
- Circulation: 550,000 (2015)

Other information
- Director: Antonia Krupicka-Smith
- Website: www.councilbluffslibrary.org

The Council Bluffs Public Library is a public library in Council Bluffs, Iowa. The library serves the residents of Council Bluffs, along with unincorporated and rural areas of Pottawattamie County. Several cities also contract with the library to provide services. It dates back to 1866. The library is currently located on Willow Avenue and opened in 1998. The previous library building on Pearl Street was listed on the National Register of Historic Places in 1999.

== History ==
- Council Bluffs Free Public Library
- U.S. National Register of Historic Places
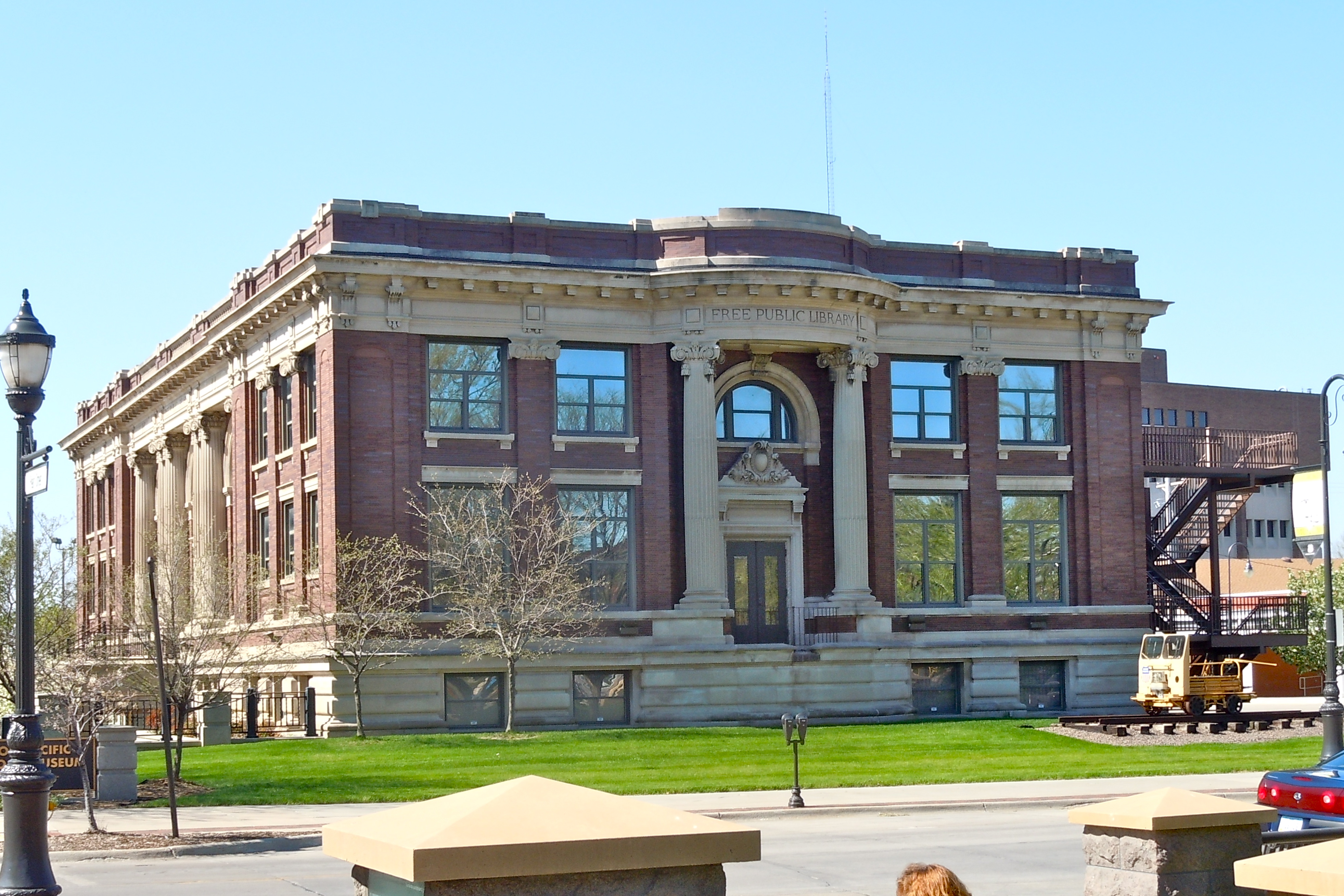
- The former Council Bluffs Public Library building in 2011
- Location: 200 Pearl St., Council Bluffs, Iowa, U.S.
- Coordinates: 41°15′29.4″N 95°51′05.3″W
- Area: less than one acre
- Built: 1905
- Architect: Patton and Miller
- Architectural style: Beaux-Arts
- NRHP reference No.: 99000048
- Added to NRHP: January 27, 1999

The Council Bluffs Public Library was formed in 1870 under the Council Bluffs High School Library Association. The Council Bluffs Free Public Library opened in 1871 and was located in rented space. The library did not have a permanent location until in 1903, W. S. Baird, a library trustee, requested a donation from Andrew Carnegie. Carnegie donated $50,000 under the condition that the city agreed to provide a site and institute an annual tax of $5,000 to operate the facility. The grant was awarded on January 6, 1903, and the new building was dedicated on September 12, 1905. The library was later added to the National Register of Historic Places on January 27, 1999.

Following the previous library's small size and deteriorating condition, a new library was announced in 1994. Demolition of the properties on site was completed in 1996, and construction on the library began in 1997. The library would be three times the size of the previous library, but would only be two stories tall. The new Council Bluffs Public Library officially opened in September 1998. The previous Carnegie library closed that same month and demolition was decided against. The former library was later converted into the Union Pacific Railroad Museum in 2013.

== Architecture ==
The original library was designed by the Chicago architectural firm of Patton & Miller in the Beaux-Arts-style. It was the largest Carnegie library built in the state of Iowa. The current library was designed by Leo A. Daly.

== List of contract cities ==
- Crescent, Iowa
- McClelland, Iowa
- Neola, Iowa
- Treynor, Iowa
- Underwood, Iowa
