= Vinton Public Library =

- U.S. National Register of Historic Places
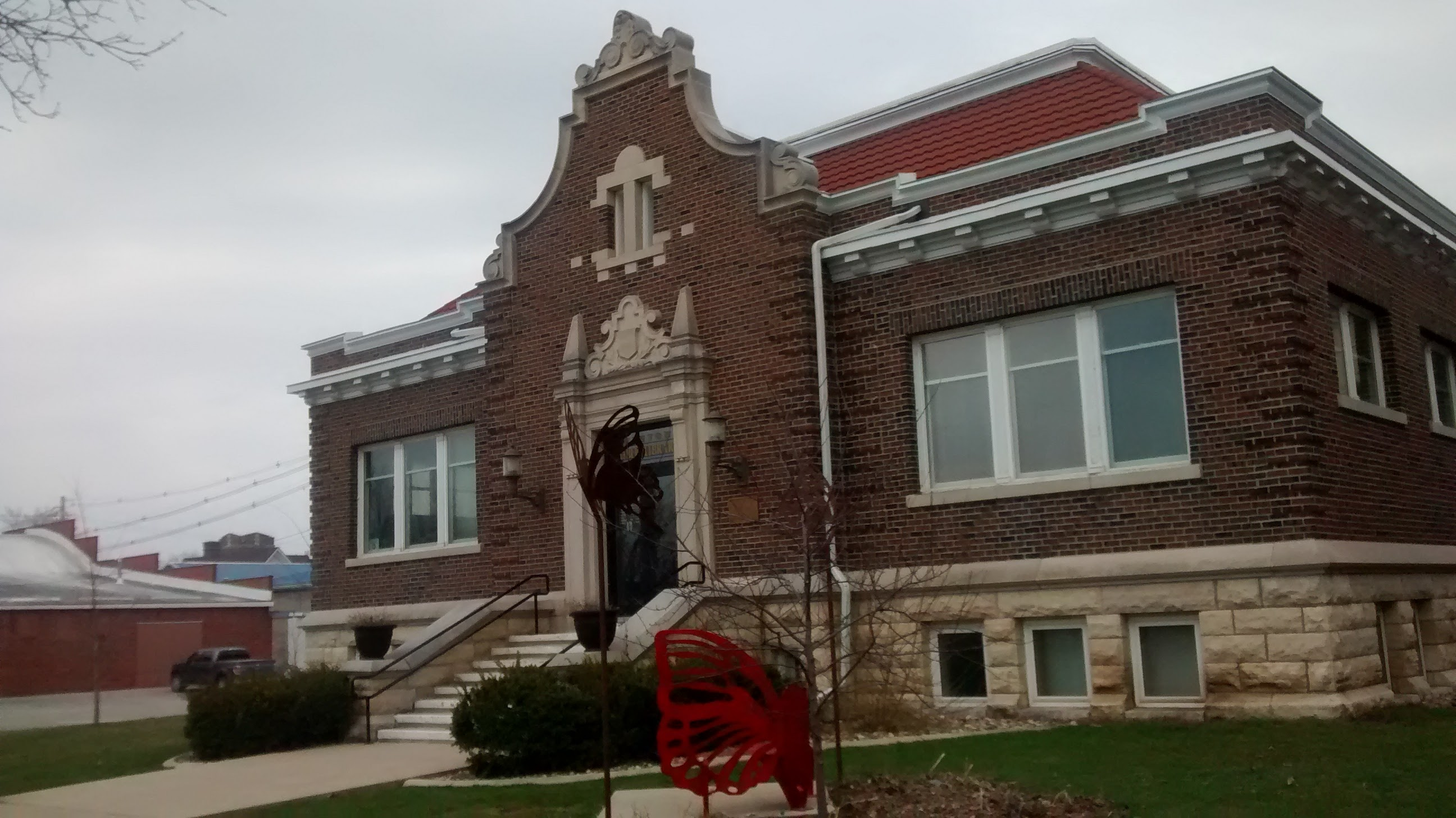

- Location within Iowa Location within the United States
- Location: 510 2nd Ave. Vinton, Iowa
- Coordinates: 42°09′59″N 92°01′21″W
- Built: 1903–1904 (122 years ago)
- Architect: Patton & Miller
- Architectural style: Renaissance Revival
- MPS: Public Library Buildings in Iowa TR
- NRHP reference No.: 83000341
- Added to NRHP: May 23, 1983

The Vinton Public Library is located in Vinton, Iowa, United States.

== History ==
The community applied to the Carnegie Corporation of New York for a grant to build a public library, and on January 22, 1903, they were awarded $12,500. It was one of 22 public libraries in Iowa that were built with Carnegie grants that year, the most in the history of the program for both the state and the country. The Chicago architectural firm of Patton & Miller designed the Renaissance Revival building. It features a full parapet, hipped roof with a deck, and a Flemish gable. It was dedicated on August 25, 1904, and it has subsequently been expanded. The building was listed on the National Register of Historic Places in 1983.
