= Princeton Public Library, Illinois =

Princeton Public Library
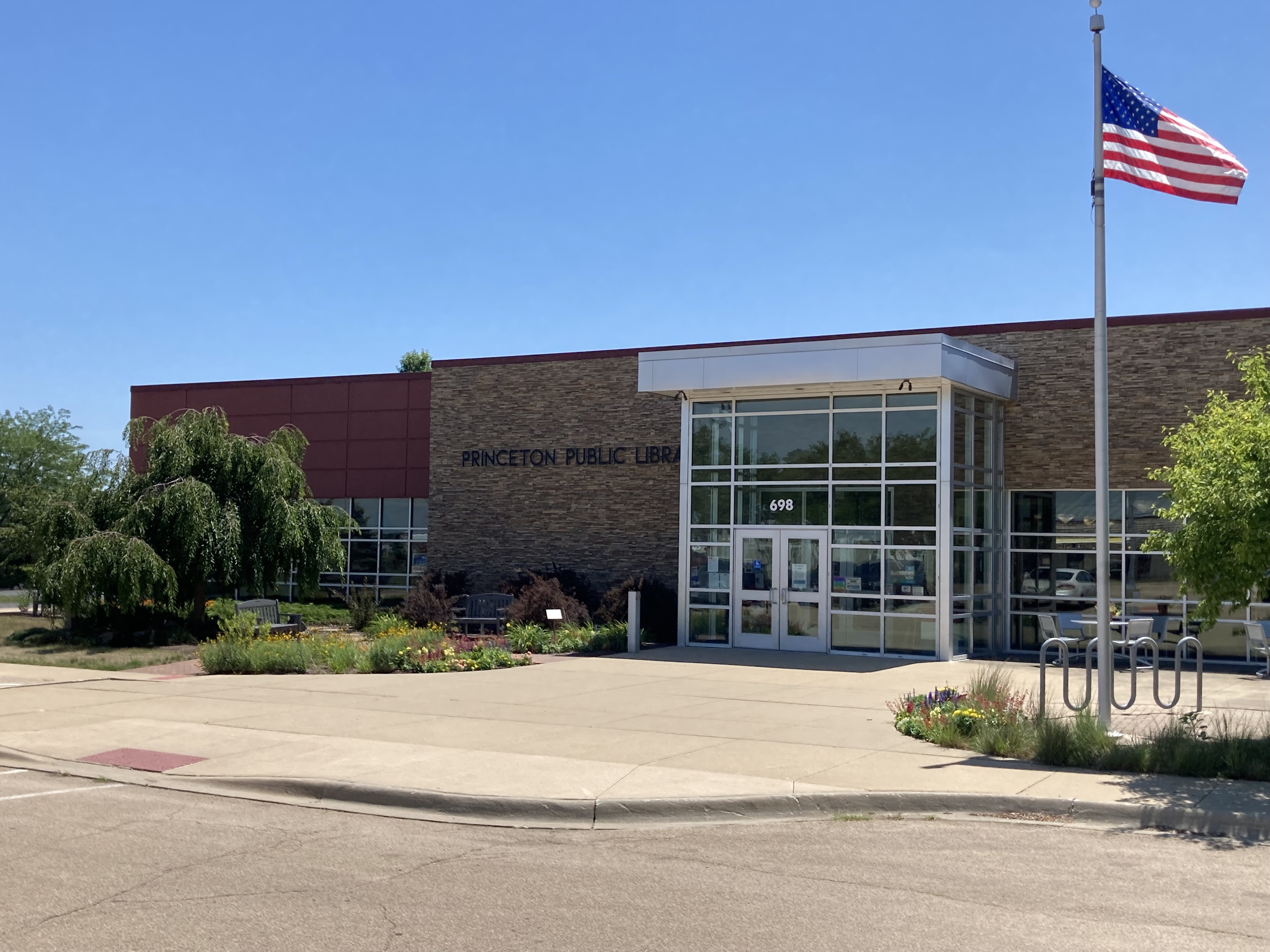
- Princeton Public Library in Princeton, Illinois
- 41°22′14″N 89°27′5″W
- Location: 698 East Peru St, Princeton, Illinois, USA
- Type: Public library
- Established: 1890

Collection
- Size: 70,562

Access and use
- Circulation: 35,447
- Population served: 7,660

Other information
- Director: Julie Wayland
- Website: princetonpl.org

Princeton Public Library is located in Princeton, Illinois, the county seat of Bureau County.

== History ==
In the late 19th century, it was realized that Princeton was in need of an open to public Library. The earliest loaning of books was by a private individual, Cyrus Bryant. Later organizations were begun such as The Bryant Circle and The Princeton Book Club. In the late 19th century work began on developing a public library.

=== 1885 – The beginning of a dream ===
Princeton Public Library, formerly known as Matson Public Library, began as a realization of a dream of Nehemiah Matson. In 1885, anticipating a bequest, the town council adopted an ordinance accepting the legacy in trust of Nehemiah to be set apart as a library fund for the city. They provided a board of nine directors to have exclusive control of the fund for the city and the power to purchase, lease or construct a building that would be suitable for a library. The town council would have custody of the building and the grounds and they would appoint suitable librarians and assistants and decide how much they would be paid.

=== 1885 to 1890 – Establishing Princeton's first library ===
On October 1, 1885, the first board of directors was appointed.

In 1886, three years after Nehemiah's death, the county court paid his bequest to the town council for the establishment of a free public library and reading room in the city of Princeton. The amount of money left to accomplish this task was $11,862.67.

In 1888, Nehemiah's legacy reached $15,000 and the board worked on finding a location for the new library.

In 1889, the board purchased a two-room structure at 529 South Main Street for $1,600 and spent an additional $655 on repair and remodeling the structure for the purpose of serving as a library. It did not have city water or a furnace. The front room was sublet and the rear room was fitted with shelves for books.

The library opened in 1890. The city council decided that its Library and Reading Room should be known as the Princeton Public Library. The first books put on the shelves were a gift from the Princeton Book Club. It was the entire collection and consisted of 800 volumes. A trained librarian, Miss Elizabeth Clark, installed the cataloging and Dewey Decimal Classification.

=== 1890 to 1900 – Princeton Public Library receives a new name ===
In 1892 the name of the library was changed to The Matson Public Library after its benefactor, Nehemiah Matson. Water was put in and in 1893 a furnace was installed.

By 1896, the library collection was growing so rapidly that a 23-foot extension was added to the east side of the building. That made room for only one table seating for six readers.

=== 1900 to 1950 – Matson Public Library gets a new home ===
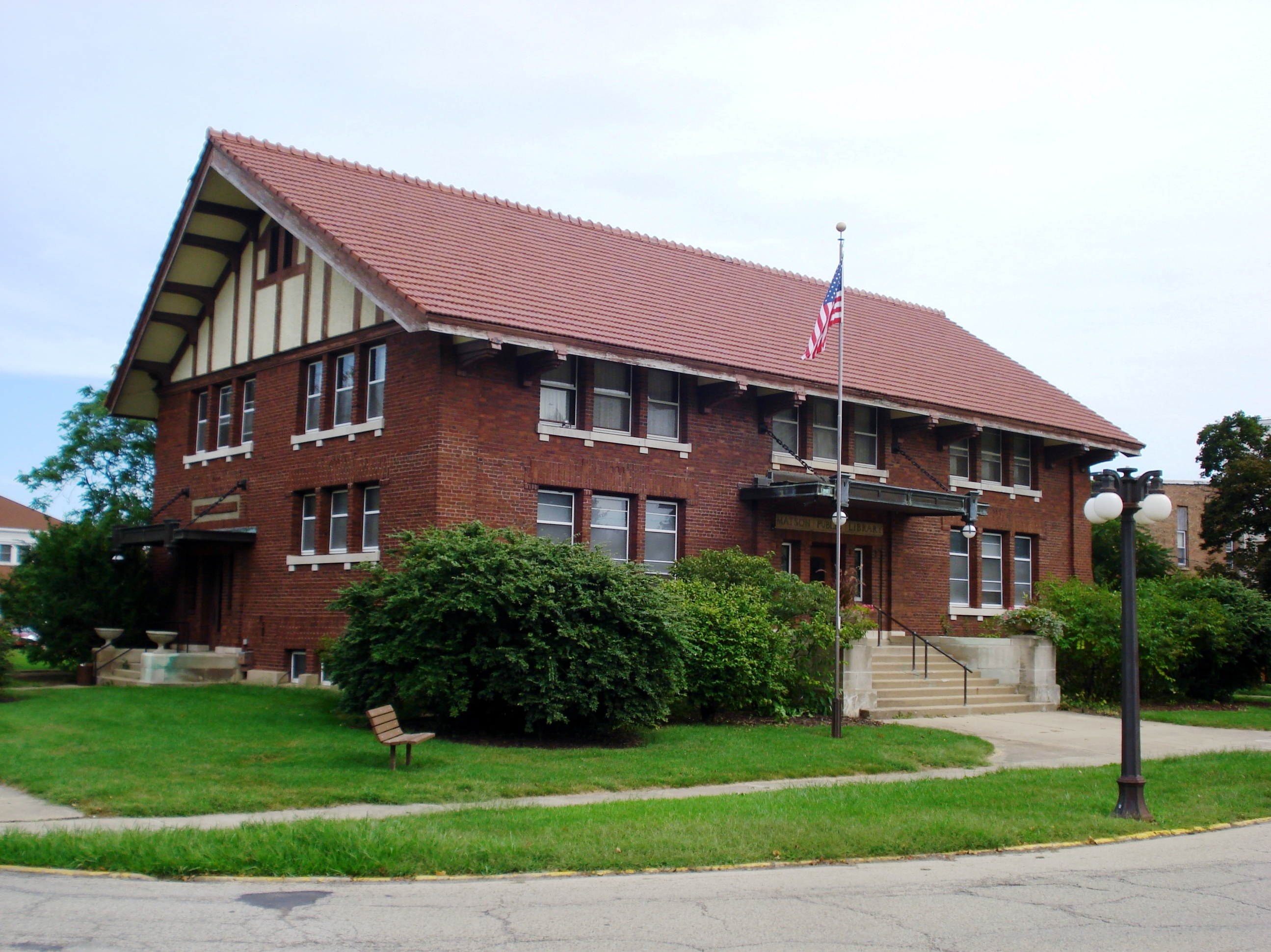
Matson Public Library, location of Princeton's library from 1913 to 2007

In 1911, Samuel P. Clark offered the board the site for the library, located at 15 Park Avenue West. It was valued at $2,500. There was a stipulation that the new building had to be well under construction within a year. First National Bank donated a strip of land adjoining on the north and later Mr. Clark added a gift of $7,720 for the purchase of the lot to the east of the library property. The board was to remove an existing building and hire a landscape gardener to enhance the property.

In 1913 the library building was completed at the cost of $23,000 and was designed by the Chicago firm Patton & Miller. The Women's Club contributed $3,400 with the reservation that there be an assembly hall on the second floor for a meeting place until the amount of rent equaled their donation. The library's collection had grown from 800 to 10,760 volumes.

The library was dedicated on April 15, 1913. It was 30 years after Nehemiah Matson's death.

In 1920 the North End Library opened as a branch in the Chapter House building erected by the American Woman's League. The purpose of this addition was to provide more accessibility. In 1958, a deed was acquired to this property.

=== 1950 to 2000 – Growing pains ===
In 1962, one of the largest basement rooms of the main library was converted in a children's room with its own entrance on Pleasant Street. This project was financed entirely by a private donation of $7,000.

Realizing that a day would come for possible expansion, the library acquired the house and lot adjoining the library grounds on the north side for $24,500.

In the late 1990s Matson Public Library was experiencing a shortage of space and parking. In July 1990 the Americans with Disabilities Act was signed by George Bush. and handicapped accessibility became a priority.

In September 1997 the library board made public their plans for two expansion sites under consideration: the existing building and the Transamerican Building at the corner of Pleasant and Crown Streets.

In November 1997 the board sponsored a public forum and selected the Transamerican Building as a site for a new library, pending on City Council and voter approval, but in March 1998 the referendum was defeated.

In October 1998 the board decided to proceed with expansion at the present library site.

=== 2000 to present – Looking toward the future ===
In August 2000 the Building Site Committee recommended that the board pursue library expansion at a new site. Over the next two years the board would consider more than 10 sites for the new Princeton Library.

In August and September 2002 complaints were filed with Office of Civil Rights, U.S. Department of Education against the library for lack of handicapped accessibility.

In July 2004, the Matson Public Library board selected a new site for the library that consisted of five acres and was located north of East Central Avenue and east of Fifth Street. They employed Burnidge-Cassell Associates to begin preliminary drawings. Once again the referendum failed.

In March 2006, Princeton voters were once again asked to vote on a $2 million referendum which would provide money necessary to buy and remodel the former Eagles/BOGO building into a modern library. This time the referendum passed and the bidding process began for contractors to undertake the remodeling process.

In August 2006 the library board began a capital campaign to raise $600,000 from private funds to help finance the building project that was estimated at $3 million.

On July 21, 2007, the Matson Public Library closed and reopened at its new location on Peru Street. Once again, for the second time in the history of the library, it took the name of Princeton Public Library and on August 1, 2007, the newly remodeled building opened its doors offering a fully accessible library with abundant parking space, a spacious library.

== Current library ==
Currently, the Princeton Public Library employs one full-time Director and three full-time librarians. The Princeton Public Library also employs ten part-time librarians. The Library Board consists of nine members. Friends of the Library is a volunteer organization that both assists library staff, delivers to home-bound patrons, and raises funds to aid the library with purchases of technology, equipment, and programs. Princeton Public Library houses a collection of over 60,000 items, and is able to order from 8 million items from more than 250 library locations through PRAIRIECAT. Princeton Public Library cardholders may also check out e-books and digital audio books through Online Media of Northern Illinois.

The library offers a wide variety of services which includes lamination, microfilm readers, fax service, online catalogs, magnifying readers, free Wi-Fi throughout the building, and a drive-up book drop. The library provides federal and state tax forms.

The library has housed a wide range of programs and exhibits which includes, "Art & Architecture In Illinois Libraries","Bookstock: 6 Days of Music & Memories, "A Remembrance: Cherry Mine 1909, "From Both Sides: An Exhibit of Artists & Their Admirers, and a traveling Smithsonian exhibit, "Between Fences". From November 18 through December 29, 2012, the library hosted its second traveling Smithsonian exhibit, "Journey Stories."

In July 2010, The Library Cafe was added. The cafe employs two part-time baristas.
