= Linton Commercial Historic District =

Historic district in Indiana, United States

- U.S. National Register of Historic Places
- U.S. Historic district
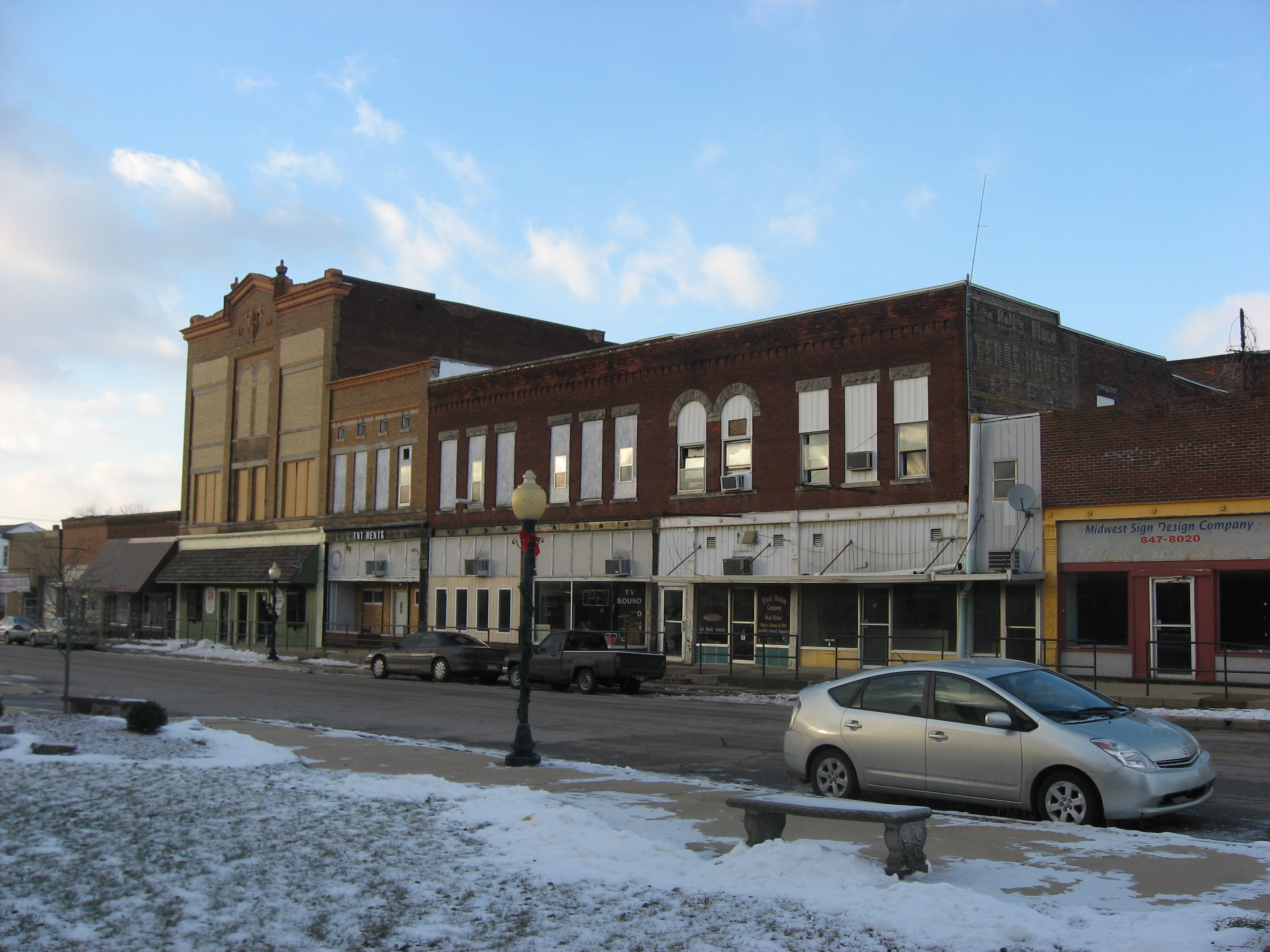
- Linton Commercial Historic District, December 2010

- Location within Indiana Location within the United States
- Location: Roughly bounded by B St. N, 1st St. E, A St. S, 1st St. W, Linton, Indiana
- Coordinates: 39°02′03″N 87°09′58″W
- Area: 18 acres (7.3 ha)
- Architect: Patton & Miller; Fredick, Ewin T., et al.
- Architectural style: Italianate, Romanesque, et al.
- NRHP reference No.: 07000214
- Added to NRHP: March 30, 2007

Linton Commercial Historic District is a national historic district located at Linton, Indiana. It encompasses 66 contributing buildings in the central business district of Linton. It developed between about 1870 and 1950, and includes notable examples of Italianate and Romanesque Revival style architecture. Notable buildings include the Linton Masonic Hall (c. 1900), I.O.O.F. Building (1892), Fourth Vein Coal Company Department Story (c. 1890), Telephone Exchange Building (1910), Linton Post Office (1934), Cine Theater (1938), and Linton City Hall (1913).

It was listed on the National Register of Historic Places in 2007.
