= Onawa Public Library =

- U.S. National Register of Historic Places
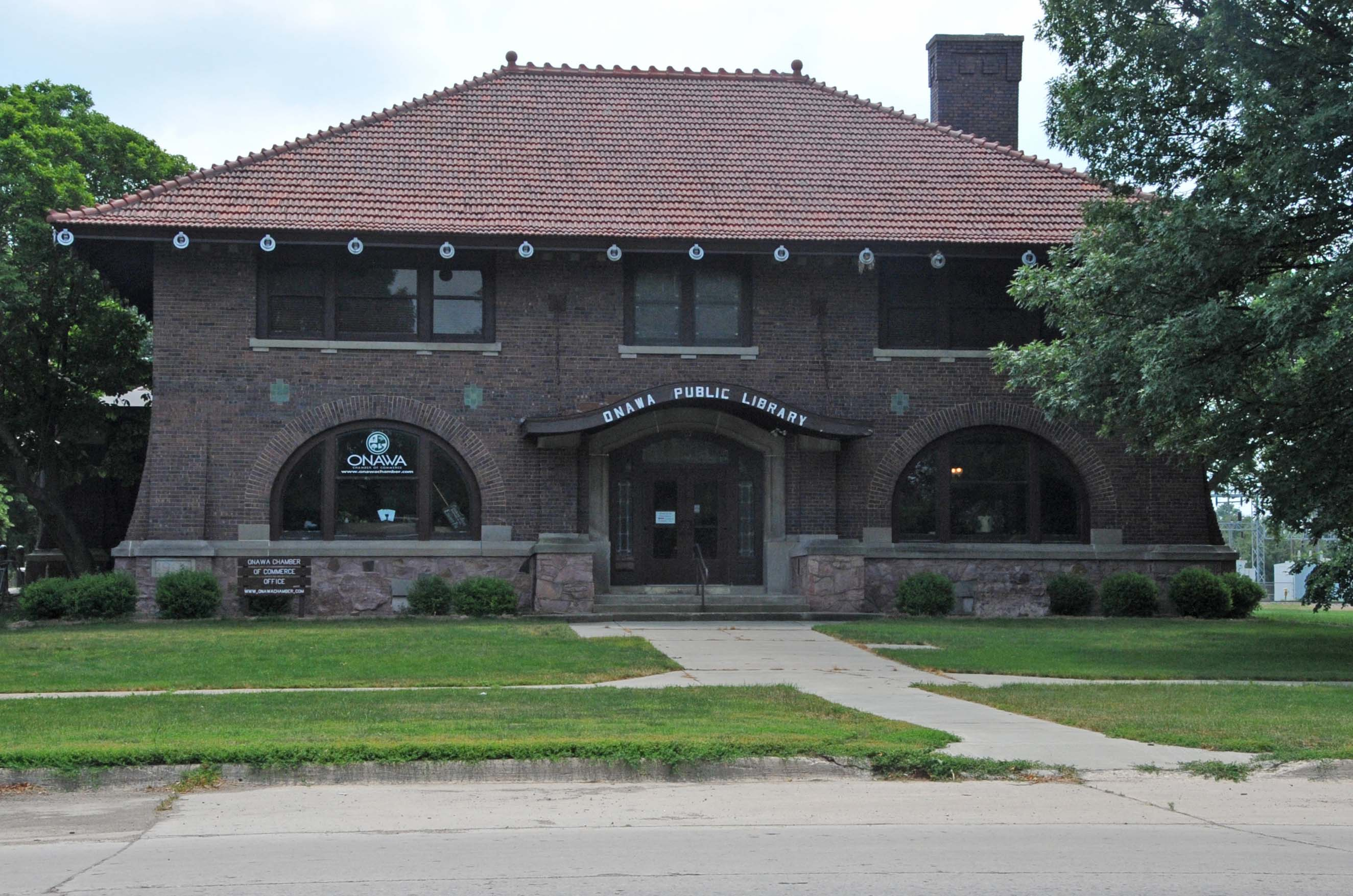

- Location within Iowa Location within the United States
- Location: Iowa Ave. and 7th St. Onawa, Iowa
- Coordinates: 42°01′34.7″N 96°05′36.5″W
- Built: 1909
- Architect: Patton & Miller
- Architectural style: Prairie School
- NRHP reference No.: 79000917
- Added to NRHP: October 1, 1979

Onawa Public Library is located in Onawa, Iowa, United States. The public library began in 1902 when Judge Addison Oliver offered to buy the former Congregational Church for a library building, and funds to buy books and fixtures. His offer was accepted by the community, which also promised to maintain the facility as a free library. The library soon outgrew the old church and in November 1906 the board of directors approached the Carnegie Corporation of New York for a grant to build a library building. A $10,000 grant was approved on December 13, 1907. Judge Oliver donated another $10,000 for the building, and an additional $10,000 for an endowment fund. The Chicago architectural firm of Patton & Miller designed the Prairie School building, which was dedicated on October 22, 1909. It was listed on the National Register of Historic Places in 1979.

The library is a two-story brick structure built on a foundation of Sioux Falls granite that is laid as random rubble. The granite extends to the bottom of the first floor windows. The central entry is flanked by side- and toplights, and surrounded by white limestone. A curved canopy is suspended by a pair of chains over the steps. Buttress piers at the corners curve upward from the limestone water table and fade into the wall surface at the second floor. The arched windows on the first floor are surrounded by brick arches that rise from limestone impost blocks at the water table. The building is capped with a tile hipped roof.
