= Jacksonville Public Library (Illinois) =

- U.S. National Register of Historic Places
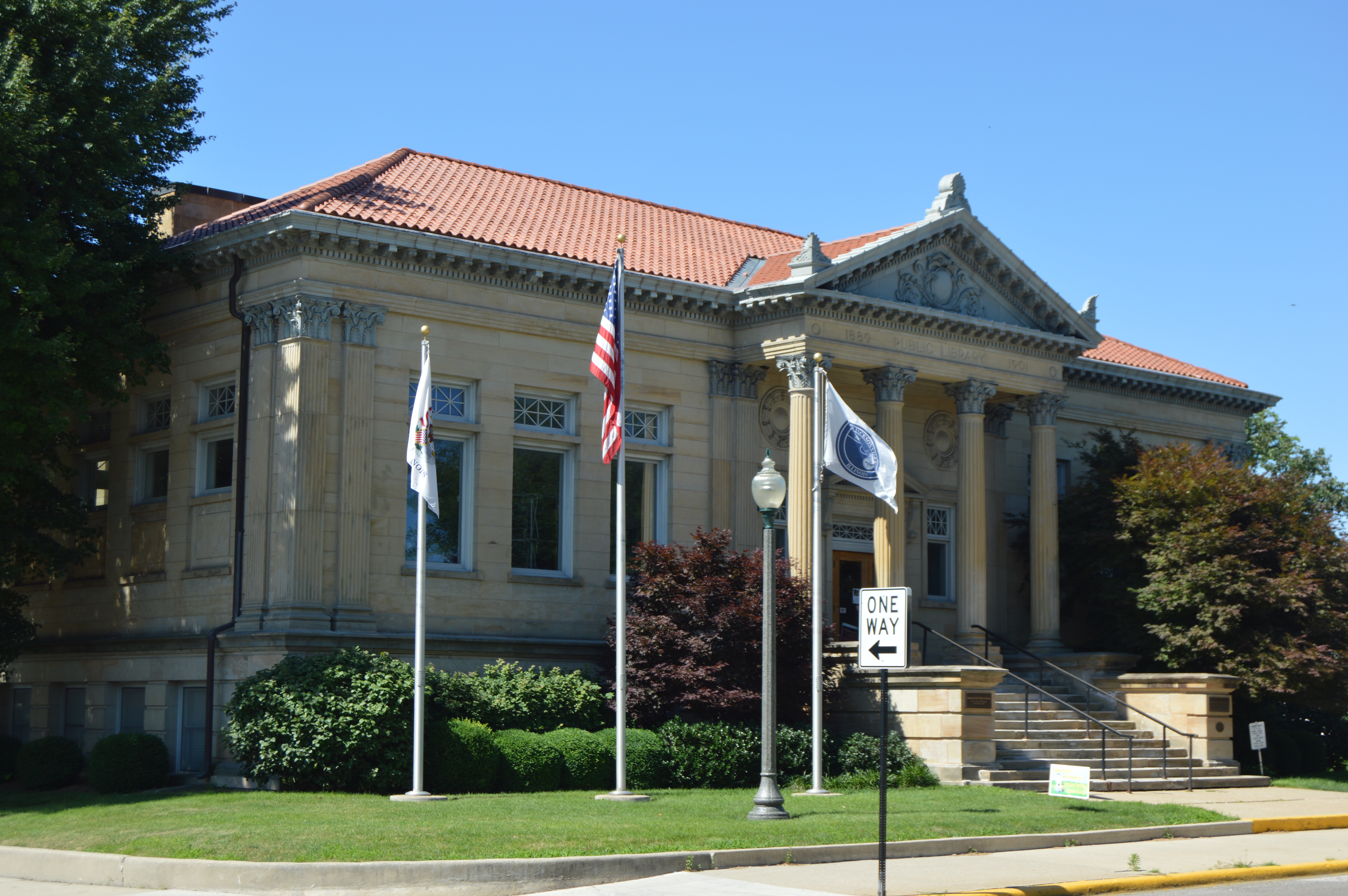

- Location within Illinois Location within the United States
- Location: 201 W. College Ave., Jacksonville, Illinois
- Coordinates: 39°43′56″N 90°13′49″W
- Area: less than one acre
- Built: 1902
- Architect: Patton & Miller
- Architectural style: Classical Revival
- MPS: Illinois Carnegie Libraries MPS
- NRHP reference No.: 00000953
- Added to NRHP: August 24, 2000

The Jacksonville Public Library is a Carnegie library located at 201 West College Avenue in Jacksonville, Illinois. The library was built in 1902 to house the city's library program, which began in 1870. Chicago architects Patton & Miller designed the Classical Revival building. The building still houses the city's public library and is listed on the National Register of Historic Places.

== History ==
Jacksonville began its library program in 1870, but the library did not have a permanent home for its first three decades. The original program was a members-only program based out of the county courthouse. A free reading room opened in 1874, and the City of Jacksonville took control of the library in 1881; at this time, it was relocated to the city's YMCA. The library moved to a larger space in a building on South Main Street in 1897, but by this point it was growing fast enough to need a separate building. Lawyer L. O. Vaught petitioned Andrew Carnegie for a donation to build a library in 1901; the Carnegie Foundation gave the city $40,000 for a building. The library was built in 1902 and opened to the public in February of the following year.

The library was added to the National Register of Historic Places on August 24, 2000. The building was expanded in the 1990s and continues to house the city's library.

== Architecture ==
Chicago architects Patton & Miller, who designed over 80 library buildings, designed the library. The two-story library has a Classical Revival design and a cross-shaped plan, the preferred library plan of Carnegie's secretary James Bertram. A portico supported by four Corinthian columns covers the front entrance; the front door features glass sidelights and transoms. A dentillated and bracketed pediment tops the entrance, and a dentillated cornice runs along the library's roof line. Double pilasters mark each corner of the building.
