= Greenville Public Library =

- U.S. National Register of Historic Places
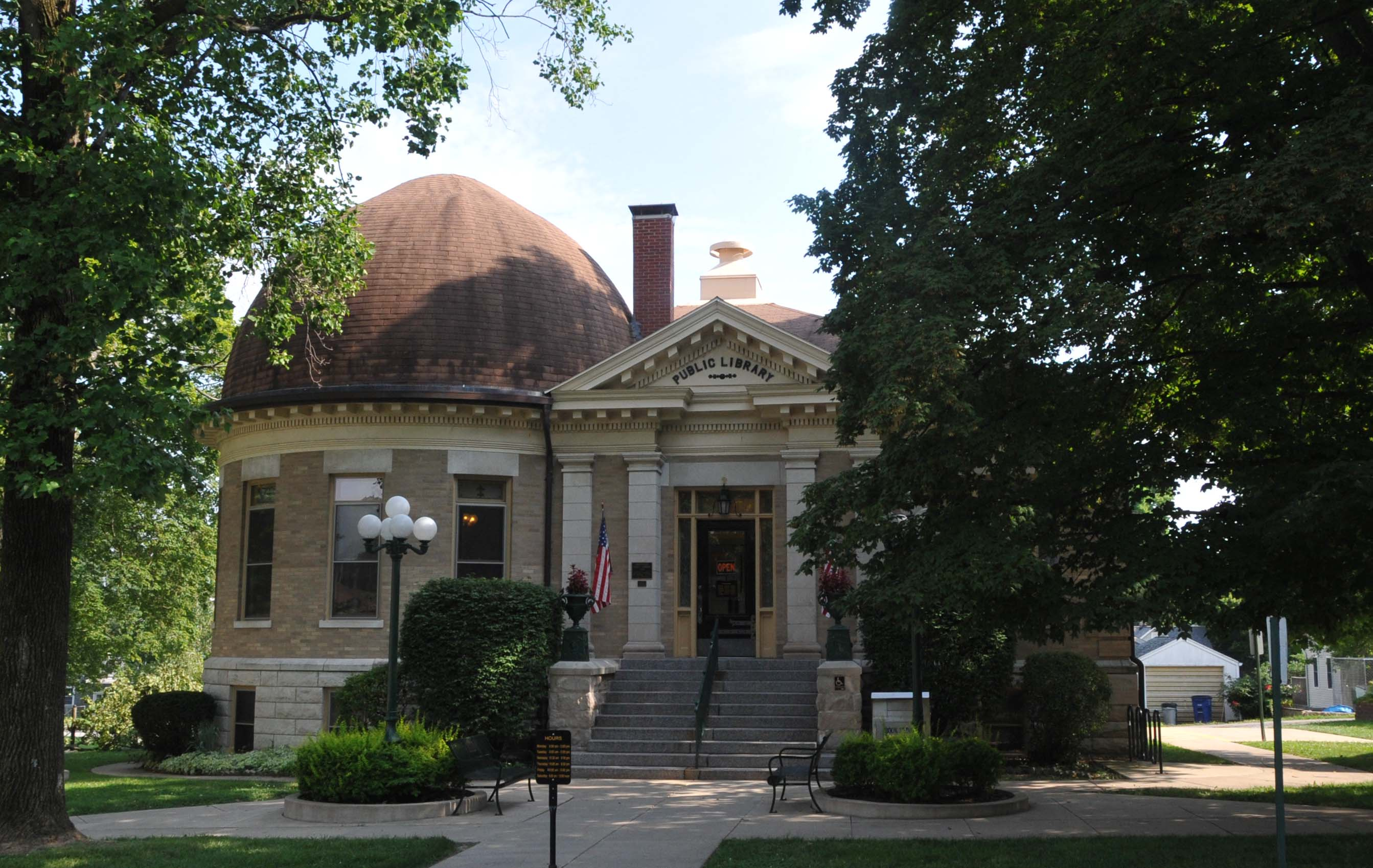

- Location within Illinois
- Location: Greenville, Illinois, United States
- Coordinates: 38°53′22″N 89°24′13″W
- Built: 1905
- Architect: Paul O. Moratz
- Architectural style: Classical Revival
- MPS: MPL015 - Illinois Carnegie Libraries Multiple Property Submission
- NRHP reference No.: 95000991
- Added to NRHP: August 4, 1995

The Greenville Public Library is located in the Bond County, Illinois city of Greenville. It was built in 1905 and was added to the National Register of Historic Places in 1995.

== History ==
In January 1856, the Ladies Social Circle of Greenville met to form a group to promote the intellectual and moral elevation of society. For nearly fifty years this group raised funds to support a library. In late 1800s, the Ladies Library Association raised $1,000.00 from the community and collected 4,000 books. The first book purchased for the library's holdings was the Holy Bible. At first the library was housed in the librarian's home, then in rented rooms, and eventually in the courthouse.

In 1903, Andrew Carnegie was contacted for possible funds. His donation of $10,000 was used to construct a public library to be built on city-owned land and which was to be tax supported. Architect Paul O. Moratz of Bloomington, Illinois, designed the Classical Revival style structure. The library opened in August 1905 after much community support and work.

== Collection ==
The library houses 25,000 volumes plus video tapes and audio books. The holdings of the Bond County Genealogical Society are housed on the lower level of the library. The collection also includes every issue of the Greenville Advocate, the local newspaper, from the 1858 to present, on microfilm.

The Greenville Public Library is a member of the Illinois Heartland Library System and offers many services. One notably unique service is that patrons may check out fishing poles provided by Illinois Department of Natural Resources (three-day loan).
