= Paxton Carnegie Public Library =

Public library in Paxton, Illinois, US

- U.S. National Register of Historic Places
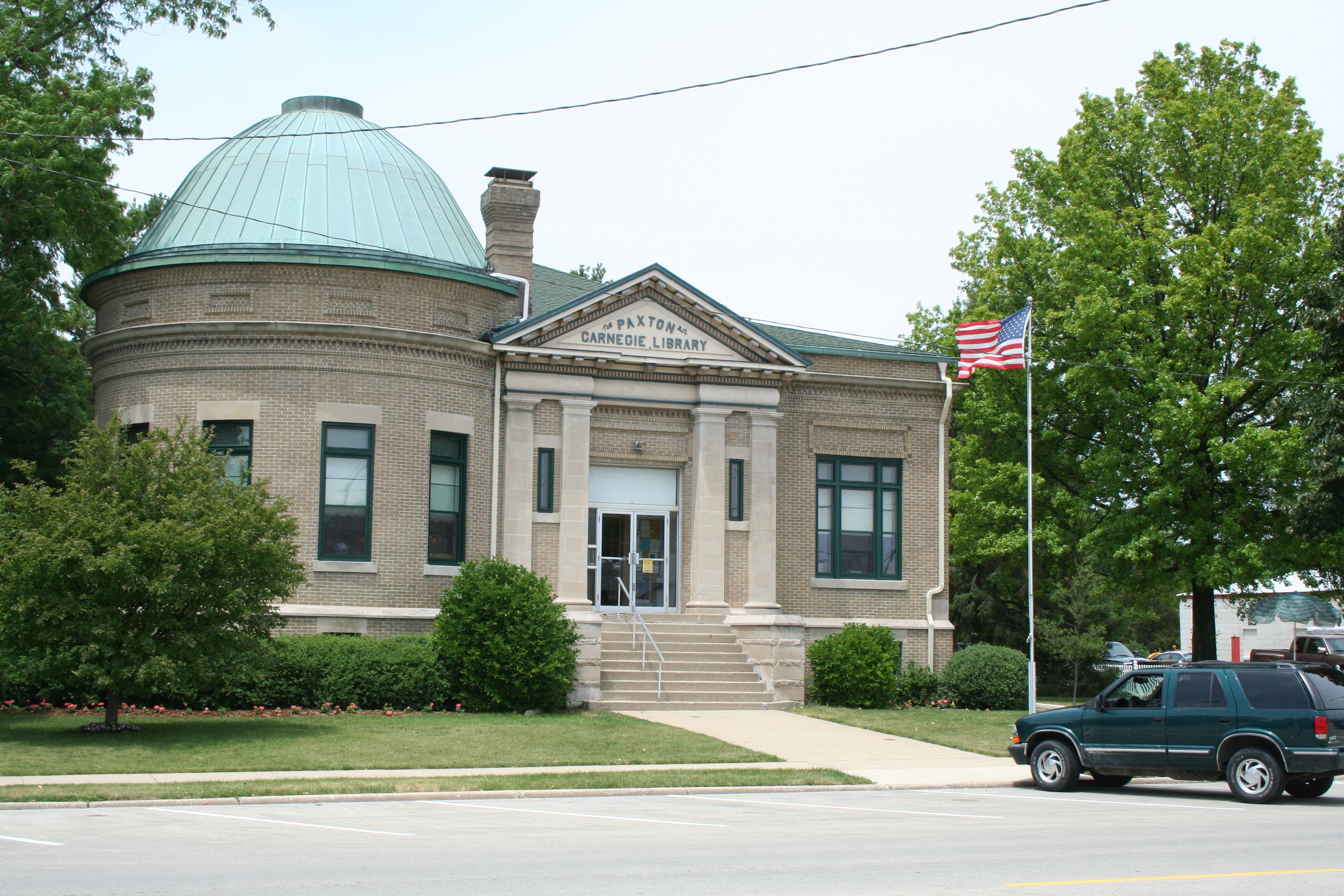
- Paxton Carnegie Public Library, 2007

- Location within Illinois Location within the United States
- Location: 254 S. Market St., Paxton, Illinois
- Coordinates: 40°27′31″N 88°5′45″W
- Built: 1904
- Architect: Paul O. Moratz
- Architectural style: Classical Revival
- MPS: MPL015 - Illinois Carnegie Libraries Multiple Property Submission
- NRHP reference No.: 02000463
- Added to NRHP: May 17, 2002

Paxton Carnegie Public Library is in the Ford County, Illinois city of Paxton. The building is on the National Register of Historic Places. The building is still used by the Paxton Carnegie Library and is open as a public library.

== History ==
This Carnegie Library was established in 1903 with the help of a grant from steel magnate Andrew Carnegie. The building was designed by architect Paul O. Moratz of Bloomington, Illinois, and its unique architectural features have been preserved throughout its over 100-year history. Construction on the Paxton Library began when the $10,000 Carnegie grant came through; the cornerstone was laid by Harry and George Turner in October 1903. The interior has been restored to its original 1903 appearance, the original furnishings are still in use as is the original oak circulation desk. In 2003 the cornerstone of the library was removed during the 100th-anniversary celebration by Harry Turner's grandson, Alan Turner of Paxton.

== Today ==
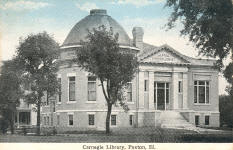
The Paxton Carnegie Library, shortly after its completion, is depicted in this early 20th-century postcard.

The Paxton Carnegie Library is governed by a nine-member board of trustees which meets the first Wednesday of each month. Today, the library houses over 26,000 volumes, subscriptions to 73 periodicals for adults and 10 for children and 4 newspapers, 1,000 videos, 300 audio books, microfilm, vertical files, city and county history information, large print books and computers and fax machines for public use. Books are circulated for two weeks at a time, magazines and DVDs for one week. There are overdue fines assessed. All residents of the city of Paxton may have a free library card while non-residents are required to pay an annual fee. The library is an active member of the Illinois Heartland Library System.

== See also ==
- Sycamore Public Library
