= Paris Carnegie Public Library =

Carnegie library in Paris, Illinois, US

- U.S. National Register of Historic Places
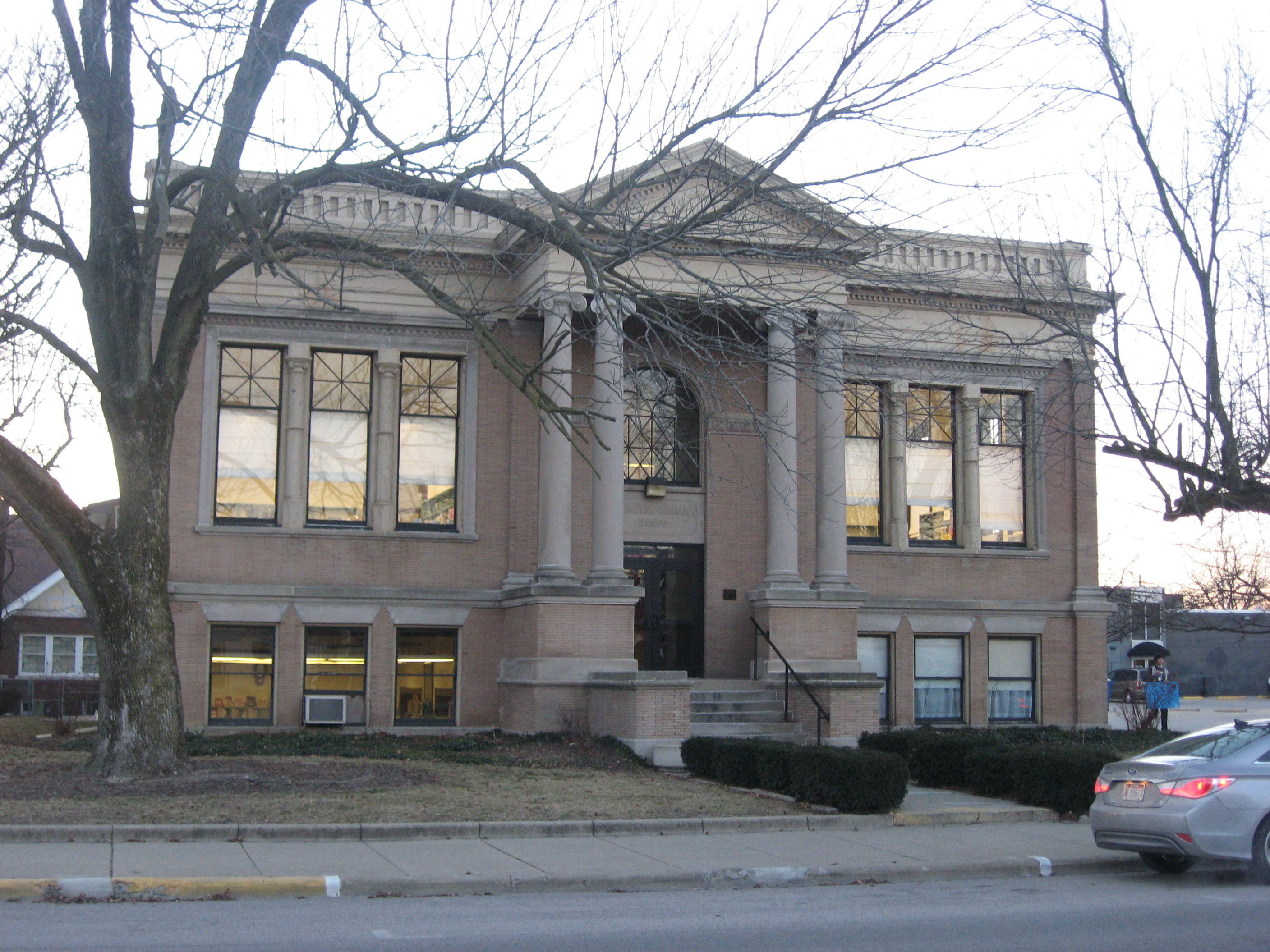
- Front of the library
- Location: Paris, Illinois, Edgar County, Illinois, United States
- Coordinates: 39.60941°N 87.69526°W
- Built: 1903–1904
- Architect: Charles Henry & Son
- Architectural style: Classical Revival
- MPS: MPL015 - Illinois Carnegie Libraries Multiple Property Submission
- NRHP reference No.: 02000464
- Added to NRHP: May 2002

The Paris Carnegie Public Library was opened to the public on June 24, 1904. The building is on the National Register of Historic Places and is still home to the Paris Public Library at 207 South Main Street in Paris, Illinois, located in Edgar County.

== History ==
=== Establishment and construction ===
The 1904 establishment of the Paris Carnegie Public Library came out of a small library started by the Paris Women's Club and facilitated by an $18,000 grant from Andrew Carnegie. The building was dedicated on June 24, 1904, at the Christian Church in Paris, following the dedication celebration the library was first opened to the public for inspection. The library, upon opening, was home to over 3,000 volumes.

The process of securing a Carnegie Library for Paris was described by Dr. E.O. Laughlin, a member of the city council in Paris when the library was granted to the city. "The idea of securing a Carnegie Library for Paris crystallized in the Ferris drug store, which served the purpose of a popular club in the ‘90’s and later. It was presided over by the genial Dr. Edmund Ferris, veteran of the Civil War, who talked well, listened better, and whose hospitality was such that he never thought of closing the store as long as one guest would remain," Laughlin said. This "club" gathered at the drug store where it was determined that the way to get Carnegie to support a library in Paris was through the written word. Ferris undertook the task of writing the first of several letters to the Carnegie Foundation.

The city levied a two mill tax, which was 10% of the $18,000 grant provided by Carnegie. The mayor at the time, Dr. Z.T. Baum appointed a nine-member library board which was sworn in on April 2, 1902. The appointees were to serve a term of three years. The board established a committee in charge of securing options for various possible building sites for the new library. By May 6, 1902, the present-day site, 207 S. Main Street, of the library was selected over six other possible locations at a cost of $6,500. During the month of May it was also learned that the grant would be remitted in installments of $3,000 or $4,000 upon written request of two board members.

On August 8, 1902, the architectural firm of Charles Henry & Son out of Akron, Ohio was selected to design the building. It wasn't until February 17, 1903, that the local contractor H.B. Newman was awarded the building contract with a bid of the grant amount, $18,000 and work began at the construction site.

=== The library opens ===
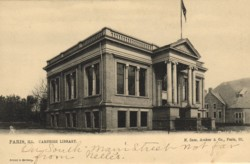
The library, shortly after its completion, is depicted in this early 1900s postcard.

On June 4, 1904, the library board met in the newly constructed building for the first time. The library joined 81 other structures in Illinois that Carnegie grants made possible. By the 1920s over 1,700 Carnegie libraries had been established throughout the United States. The Paris Library was built before the time that Carnegie and his secretary James Bertram began to restrict the amount of leeway communities were given in designed their Carnegie libraries. By 1908 Carnegie and Bertram began exercising more control over library plans. Carnegie's plans generally included brick buildings, for low maintenance, no fireplaces, for they wasted space, basements (necessitating stairs). Though the Paris Library was built four years before these plans were outlined the building is still pretty typical of Carnegie library buildings.

=== Later history ===
The Paris Public Library became a member of the Lincoln Trail Libraries System, an inter-library loan program, in 1966. That same year Katherine Bishop left a $90,000 bequest in memory of her sister, Lucy. The money was used to increase the library's reference collection and nonfiction collection. The collection at the Paris Library grew through the years until it finally reached capacity. In 1972 the meeting room in the library was renovated to house the children's collection. But eventually it was necessary to expand the Paris Public Library. The library board hired Frederick A Schlipf of Urbana Free Library as a consultant and Bhupen Panchal as architect. Panchal designed a 2,540-square-foot (236 m^{2}) addition at an estimated cost of $314,000. By this time, spring of 1990, the library board applied for a construction grant from the Illinois State Library.

July 12, 1990 then Secretary of State and State Librarian Jim Edgar arrived in Paris where he announced the Paris Carnegie Public Library would receive a grant in the amount of $124,000. Volunteers then took to the phones to raise contributions until $100,000 was reached. Among the notable contributors to the library's fund drive were the Monday Club, a club which had met in the library for over 70 years and the Paris Women's Club, the original holders of the Paris Library which was disbanding at the time of the addition to the library. The construction contract was awarded to R.J. King Company, Inc. and ground was broken on the new addition on July 25, 1991.

Construction began on September 11, 1991, and by June 1992 the new handicapped accessible entrance was opened to the public. The entire construction project was completed at a cost of $322,895 with an additional $9,045 spent on new shelving. Throughout the construction period the library remained open to the public with a circulation, 67,616, just 1,000 items short of a typical year's circulation. The new addition included, as well as the shelving for the library's 33,000+ volumes, an elevator, two new public restrooms, the handicapped accessible entrance, and a large meeting room named for Gibson. In 2002 the library adapted the northwest room to house two walls of books and six computers, of which four have Internet access. In 2004 the southeast reading room was rearranged to house the collection of large print books.

== Library people ==
=== Librarians ===
The Paris Women's Club operated its library until the new library building opened and donated their book collection, housed in the Bibo Building on West Court Street, to the library. Jane Bishop became the first librarian at the Women's Club Library; she received a salary of $2.00 per week. When Bishop resigned Emma Boyd became the library's first librarian in its new building. Following Boyd a number of others served as librarian, Ruth Link, Cressie Strimple, Minnie Denton, and Leota Price all held the post. In 1929 Nina Dulin Russell took over librarian from Price, she held the post until 1961. Her tenure was the longest of any librarian in Paris Library's history. Russell was trained as a librarian at the University of Illinois and served as first assistant librarian from 1924 to 1929 before becoming head librarian. After Russell's tenure the post was held by Alice Feutz from 1962 to 1969, Susanne J. Spicer from 1969 to 1982, Judy Caveney from 1982 to 1988. As of 2006 Teresa Pennington has held the post since 1988.

=== Library Board ===
Mary Ida Riedell has had the Paris Library Board's longest tenure. Riedell served on the board from 1948 until 2002. She held each office on the board more than once. The board's first president was J.E. Parrish in 1902. From 1915 to June 1918 there was no appointed library board. During this time period the Paris City Council made appointments of librarians. The mayor swore in a new and complete nine member library board on June 14, 1918. Additionally Robert Gibson served on the library board from 1983 until his death in 2001.

== Other Paris libraries ==
The Paris Carnegie Public Library and the Women's Club library were not the first libraries in Paris. The first one was likely the Paris Library Association which started in December 1857. The subscriber supported library charge members $25 in installments of $5, by December 1857 the Association had collected nearly $400. The chairman of the Library Association was Thomas Marks and Henry W. Davis served as secretary. By October 1858 the library held six to seven hundred volumes at a value of $925. the books were stored in various locations and loaned out during normal business hours. After the Civil War the association was disbanded and the book collection divided up amongst the stockholders.

In the 1870s and 1880s a library holding over 1,000 volumes was run by the YMCA. The books were housed in a reading room used by young men and boys. The YMCA library lasted until the end of the 1880s. Until the Women's Club established its 1,000 volume library in 1899 Paris had no library.
