= Spies Public Library =

Coordinates: 45.107548°N 87.604749°W

- Location: Menominee, Michigan, United States
- Established: 1904

Collection
- Size: 61,558

Access and use
- Circulation: 74,655
- Members: 6,071 active

Other information
- Budget: US$48,307,419
- Director: Cheryl Hoffman
- Employees: 10
- Website: Spies Public Library

Spies Public Library is a public library in Menominee, Michigan. It was built in 1903 and was funded by Agustus Spies.

== Services ==
Among Spies Library's collections are books, audiobooks, downloadable digital audio and E-books, magazines, newspapers, CDs, videos, DVDs, CD-ROMs, and microfilm. It also offers free Internet and free Wi-Fi, as well as free programs each for patrons of all ages. The library's website provides access to the library catalog, over 50 commercial research databases through Michigan eLibrary, and other information resources.

== History ==
March 1903, Mr. and Mrs. Augustus Spies announced their plans to donate money to build and furnish a new Library that would bear their name. The Spies' selected the architectural firm of Patton & Miller from Chicago. This firm was the same firm that designed many Carnegie Libraries. Perhaps, this is why even today people think the Spies Public Library is a Carnegie Library. It was built in the style of a French country chateau and is an example of Beaux-Arts architecture. The actual bid for the building was awarded to the RM. Garthwait Co. of Chicago for $21,950. The remainder of the $30,000 Spies donated was spent on furnishings many of which are still being used today. The Spies Public Library was completed and dedicated on March 30, 1905. At the ceremony, Agustus Spies said, "That it will prove a source of much good to all is my greatest wish and desire." When the library first opened it contained 5,184 volumes and 48 periodicals. Mrs. Gertrude B. Munger was the first librarian. During the first year of operation, 24,746 items were borrowed. Each year the circulation continued to grow as more citizens used the library. In 1918, a separate book collection was purchased to provide library service to all residents of the county. In compliance with the Americans with Disabilities Act, the Spies Public Library was expanded to double its size. The dedication of the new and improved library was in April 1997.
