= Vienna Public Library =

Carnegie library in Vienna, Illinois, US

- U.S. National Register of Historic Places
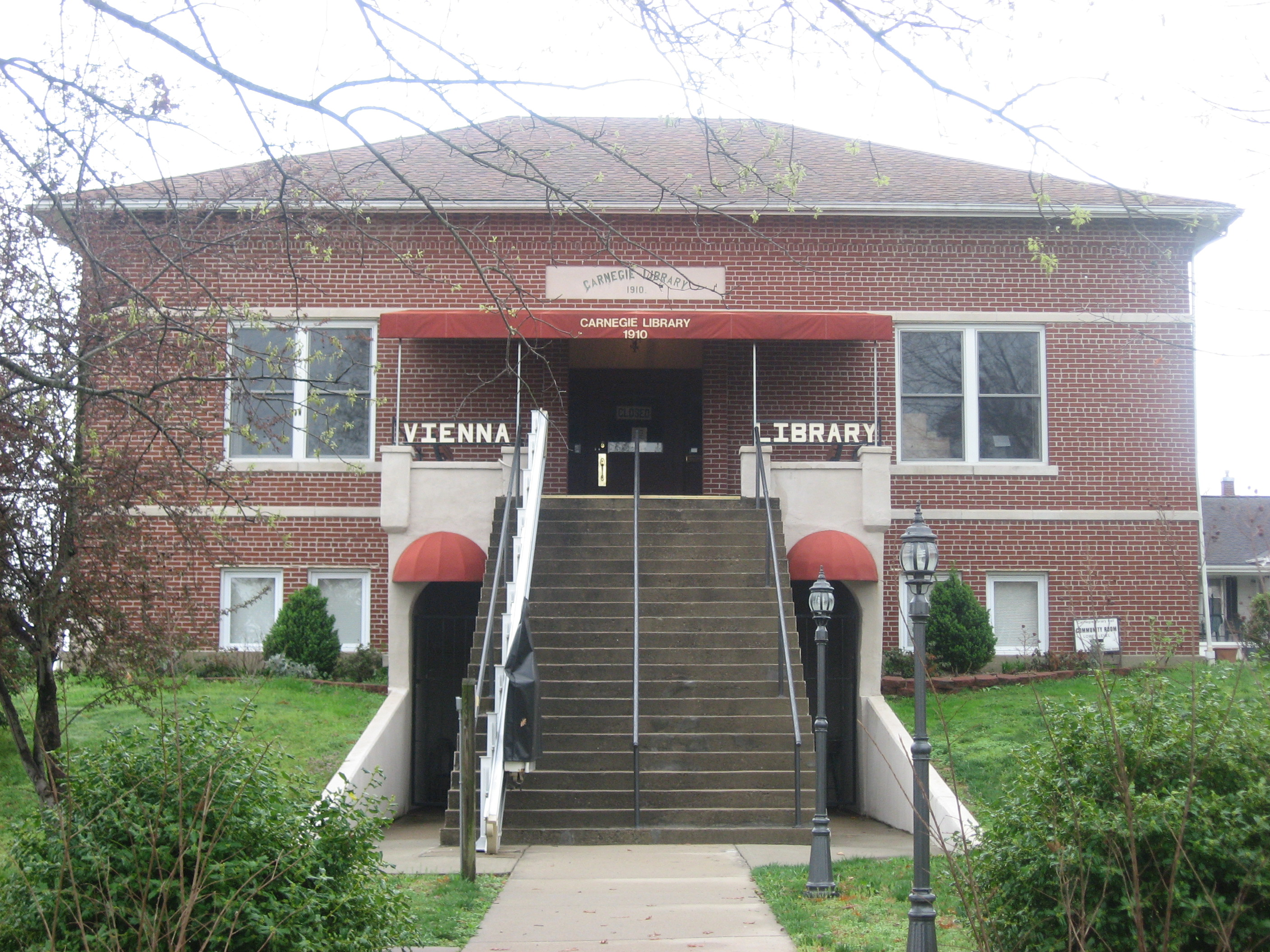
- Front of the library

- Location within Illinois Location within the United States
- Location: 401 Poplar St., Vienna, Illinois
- Coordinates: 37°24′58″N 88°53′39″W
- Built: 1911
- Built by: Davis and Bellamy
- Architect: Clymer, Thomas
- Architectural style: Classical Revival
- Website: viennapubliclibrary.org
- MPS: MPL015 - Illinois Carnegie Libraries Multiple Property Submission
- NRHP reference No.: 94001603
- Added to NRHP: January 24, 1995

The Vienna Public Library, also known as Vienna Carnegie Library, is a Carnegie library at 401 Poplar St. in Vienna, Illinois. It was built in 1911 with a $5000 grant from the Carnegie Foundation. The brick building, designed by local architect Thomas Clymer, features a tall flight of stairs leading to the front entrance; two pilasters flank the staircase. The building provided a permanent home for Vienna's library program, which was established in 1895 and had rotated through a number of local buildings prior to 1911. County medical services have also been based in the library: The American Red Cross used the building as its headquarters during a 1917 influenza outbreak, and a trachoma clinic operated in the basement from 1936 to 1964. The building has also been used as a gym, a headquarters for city services, and a meeting place for several women's organizations and the Johnson County Historical Society.

The library was added to the National Register of Historic Places on January 24, 1995. It is one of two buildings on the National Register in Johnson County, along with the Johnson County Courthouse.
