= Hoopeston Carnegie Public Library =

- U.S. National Register of Historic Places
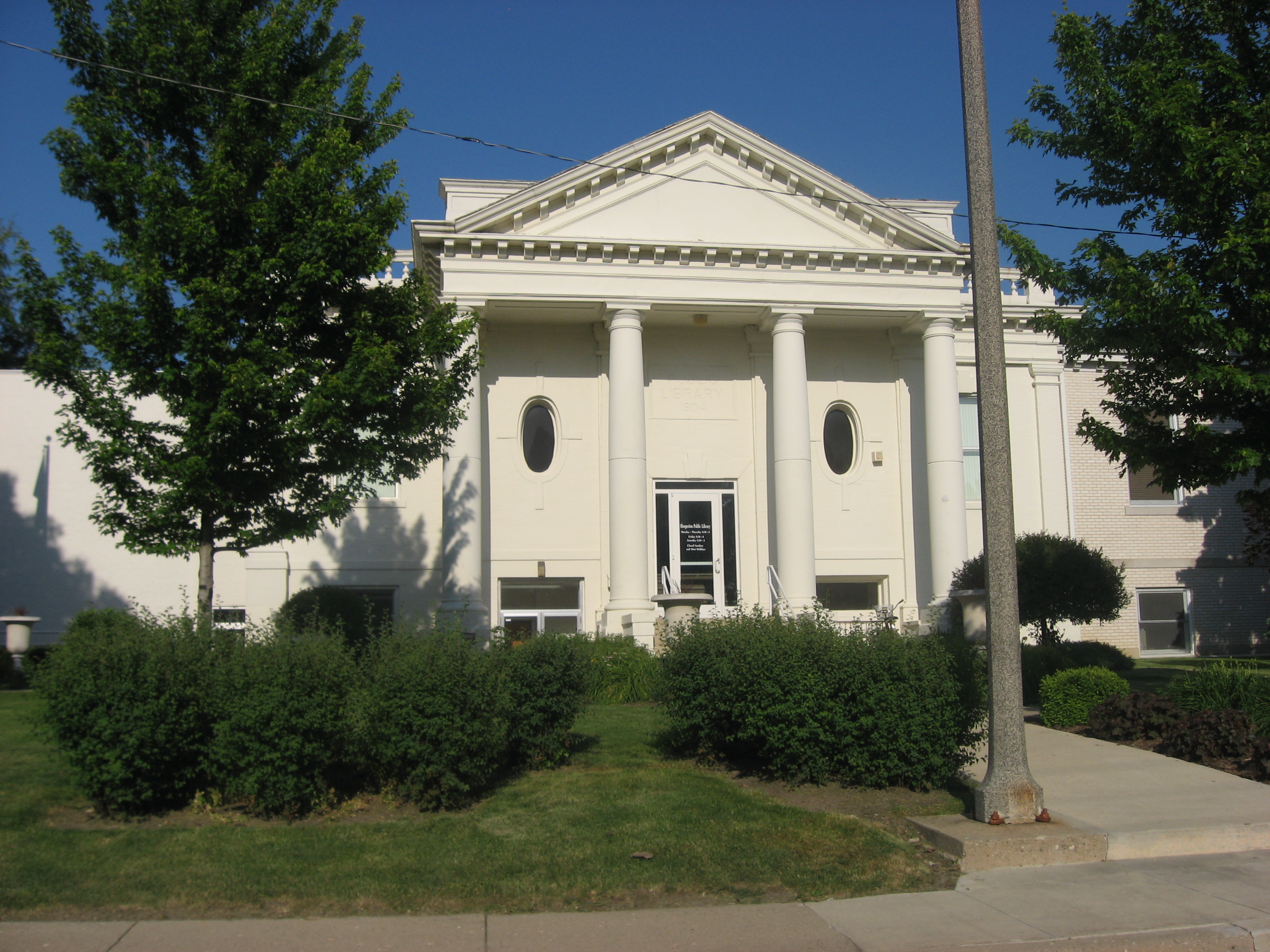

- Location within Illinois Location within the United States
- Location: 110 N. Fourth St., Hoopeston, Illinois
- Coordinates: 40°28′7″N 87°39′54″W
- Area: less than one acre
- Built: 1904
- Architect: Alexander, James F.
- Architectural style: Classical Revival
- MPS: Illinois Carnegie Libraries MPS
- NRHP reference No.: 02000458
- Added to NRHP: May 9, 2002

The Hoopeston Carnegie Public Library is a Carnegie library located at 110 N. Fourth St. in Hoopeston, Illinois. Hoopeston's library program began in 1898, when the Mary Hartwell Catherwood Club started a library in the town hall. In 1903, the program acquired a $12,500 grant from the Carnegie Foundation for a library building; the building was completed in 1904. Architect James F. Alexander designed the Classical Revival building, which features a portico entrance supported by four Tuscan columns. In 1975, an addition was placed on the building.

The building was added to the National Register of Historic Places on May 9, 2002.
