= Buffalo Township Public Library =

- U.S. National Register of Historic Places
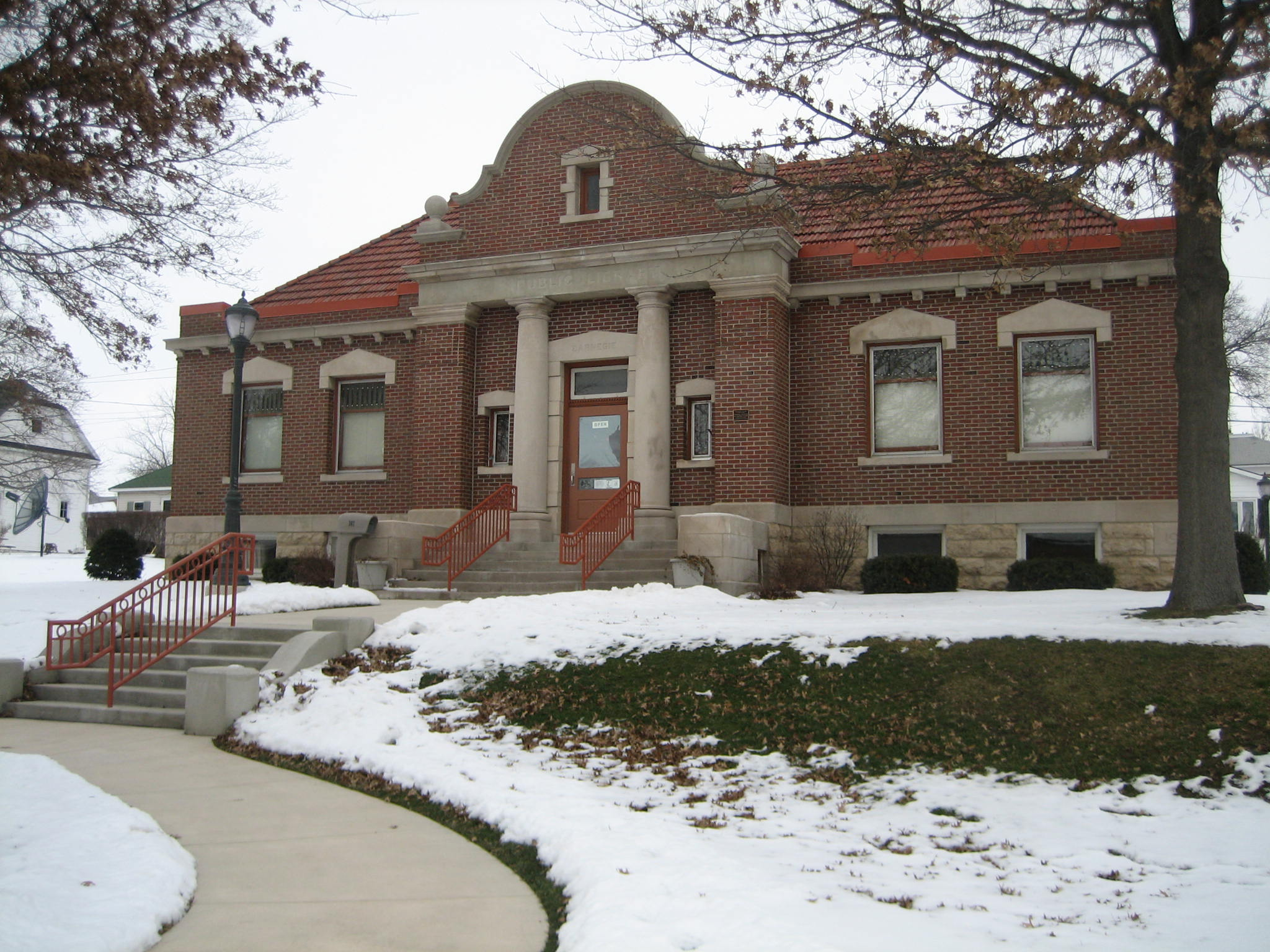
- The Carnegie Buffalo Township Public Library in Polo, Illinois.

- Location within Illinois Location within the United States
- Location: 302 W. Mason St., Polo, Illinois
- Coordinates: 41°59′13″N 89°34′38″W
- Built: 1903-04
- Architect: Patton & Miller
- Architectural style: Classical Revival
- MPS: Illinois Carnegie Libraries MPS
- NRHP reference No.: 95001236
- Added to NRHP: November 7, 1995

The Buffalo Township Public Library, now the Polo Public Library, is a Carnegie library listed on the National Register of Historic Places in the Ogle County, Illinois city of Polo.

== Architecture ==
The brick Buffalo Township Public Library sits atop a limestone foundation and features a ceramic tile roof. The library was constructed between 1903 and 1904 and was built by the firm of Greig & Baum. The Classical Revival building was designed by the architectural firm of Patton & Fisher, a firm better known as Patton & Miller which designed over 100 Carnegie libraries nationwide, including 15 in Illinois.

== Significance ==
The Buffalo Township Public Library was listed on the National Register of Historic Places on November 7, 1995, for its significance in the area of education.
