= Danville Public Library (Danville, Illinois) =

- U.S. National Register of Historic Places
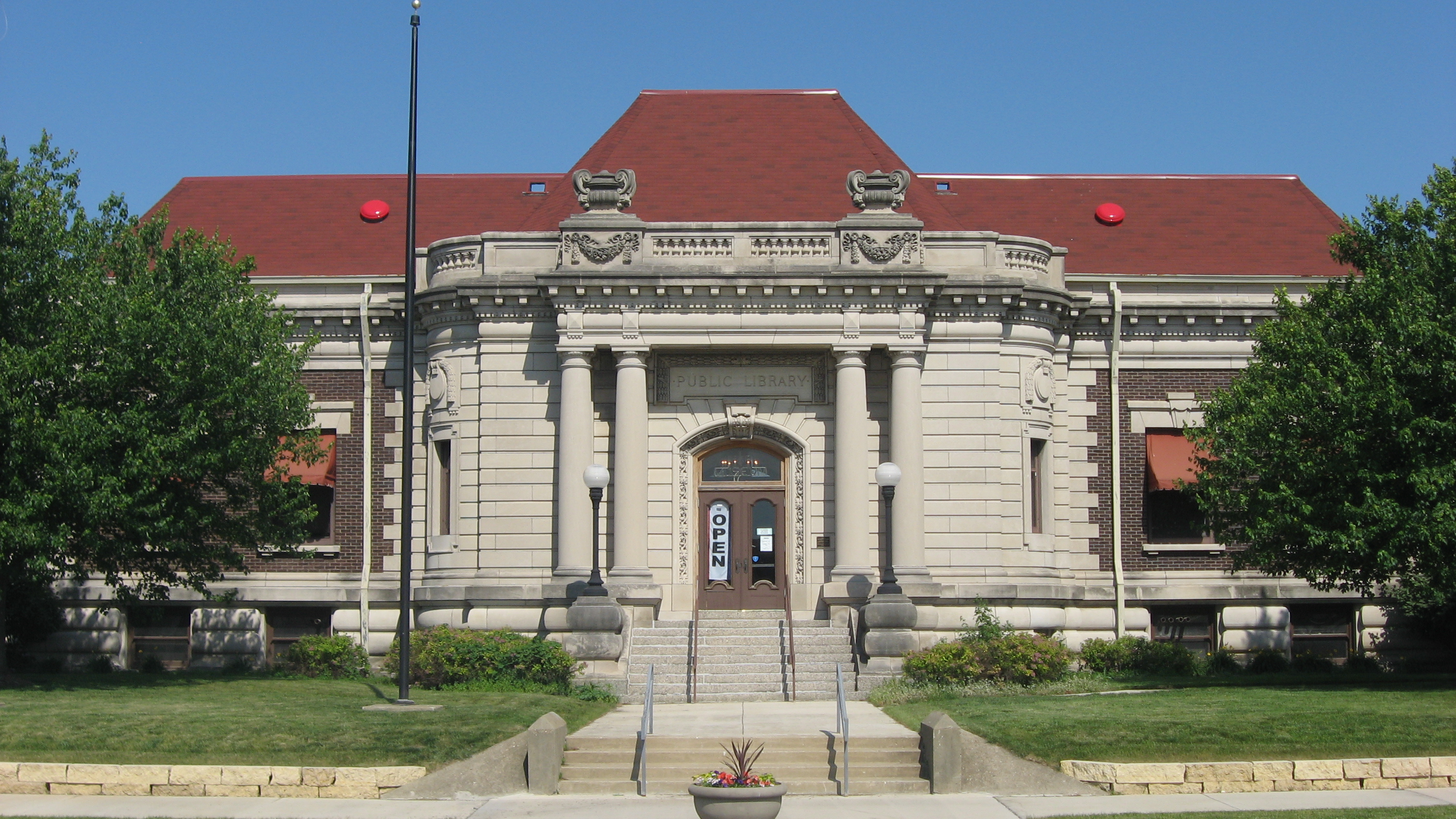
- The old Carnegie Library, now the Vermilion County War Museum

- Location within Illinois Location within the United States
- Location: 307 N. Vermillion St., Danville, Illinois
- Coordinates: 40°7′46″N 87°37′47″W
- Area: less than one acre
- Built: 1904
- Architect: Patton & Miller
- Architectural style: Beaux Arts
- NRHP reference No.: 78003064
- Added to NRHP: November 30, 1978

Danville Public Library is a library in Danville, Illinois, formed in 1883 by consolidating several existing collections. Originally it existed in rented space in buildings in downtown Danville. On November 7, 1904, a new Carnegie library opened and served for the next 91 years. The library had a Beaux-Arts design with columns flanking the front doors and a parapet wall above the entrance. It was expanded in 1929 thanks to a gift from Augustus Webster.

Construction of a new library building, located just north of the existing structure, commenced in 1994 and was completed in 1995. The grand opening of the new library took place on November 7, 1995.

The original Carnegie building still stands and now functions as the Vermilion County War Museum.

== Gallery ==
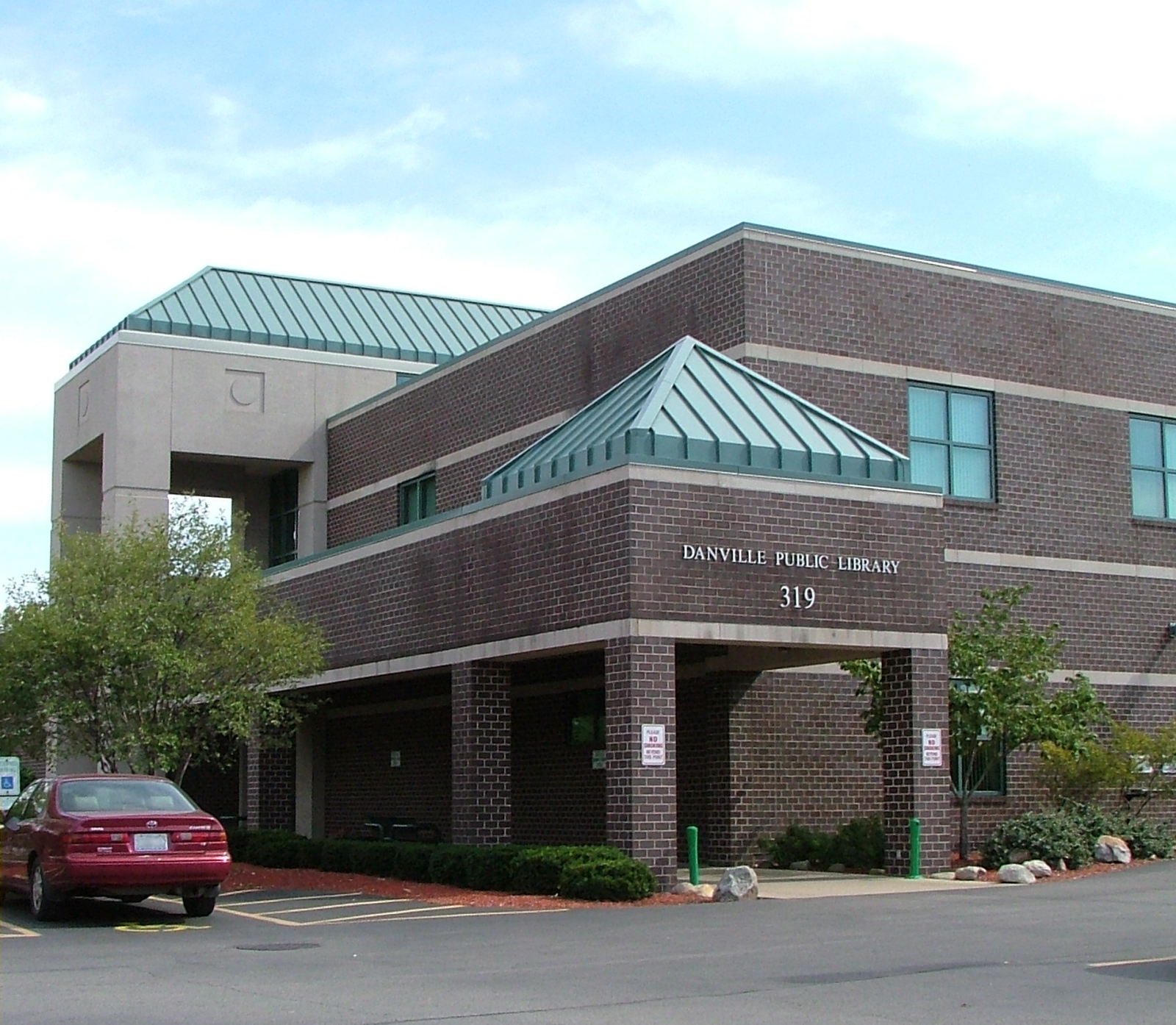
Danville Public Library

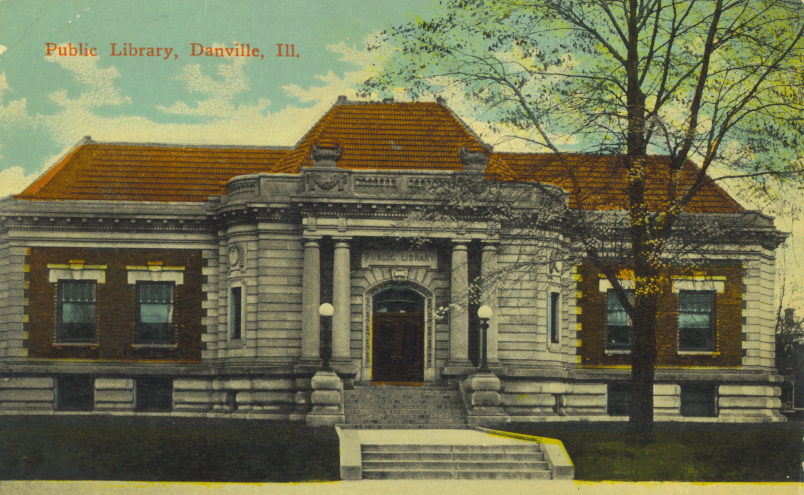
The Carnegie library circa 1920

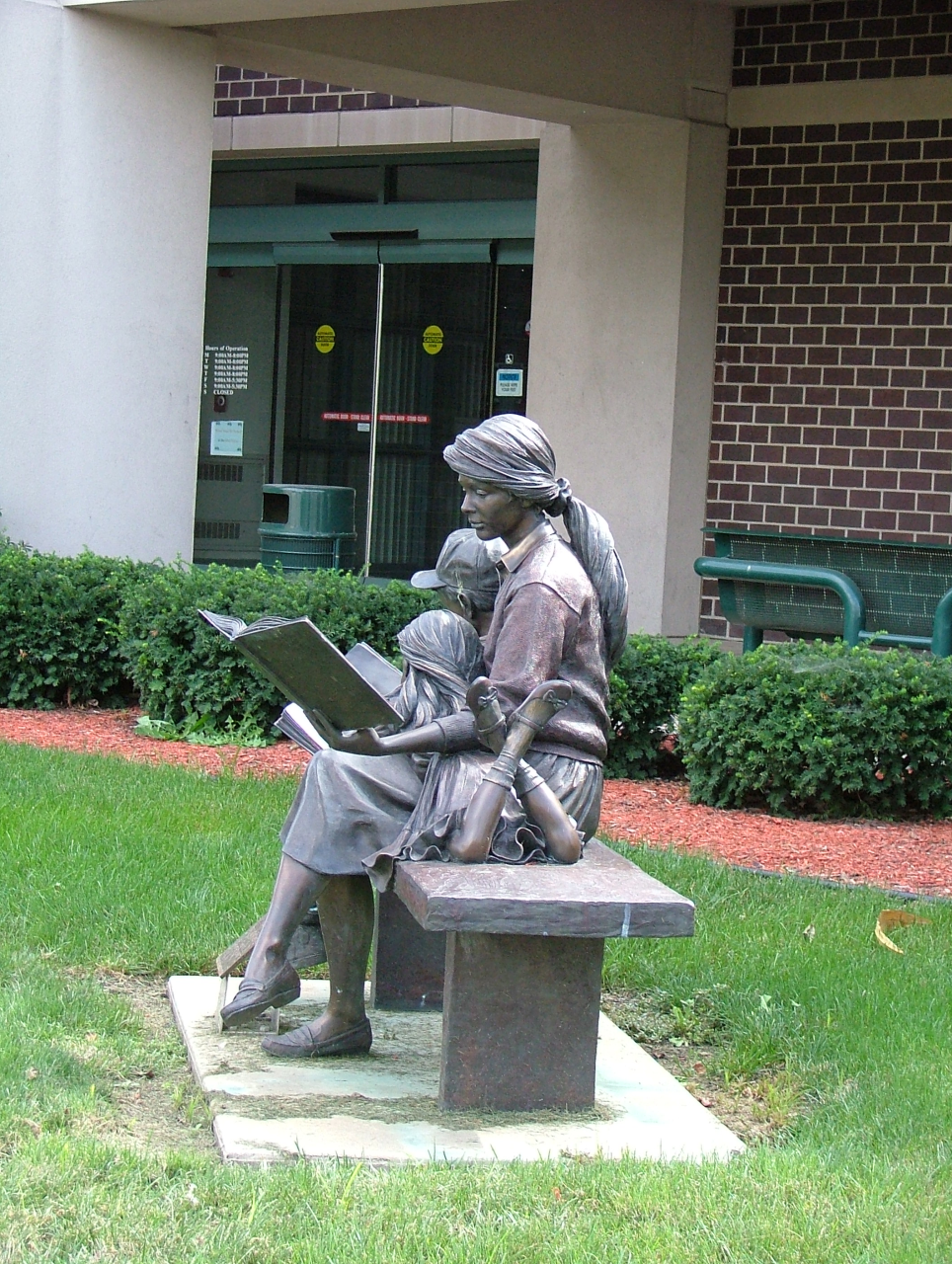
Statue at the library entrance
