= Havana Public Library =

Historic library in Havana, Illinois, US

- U.S. National Register of Historic Places
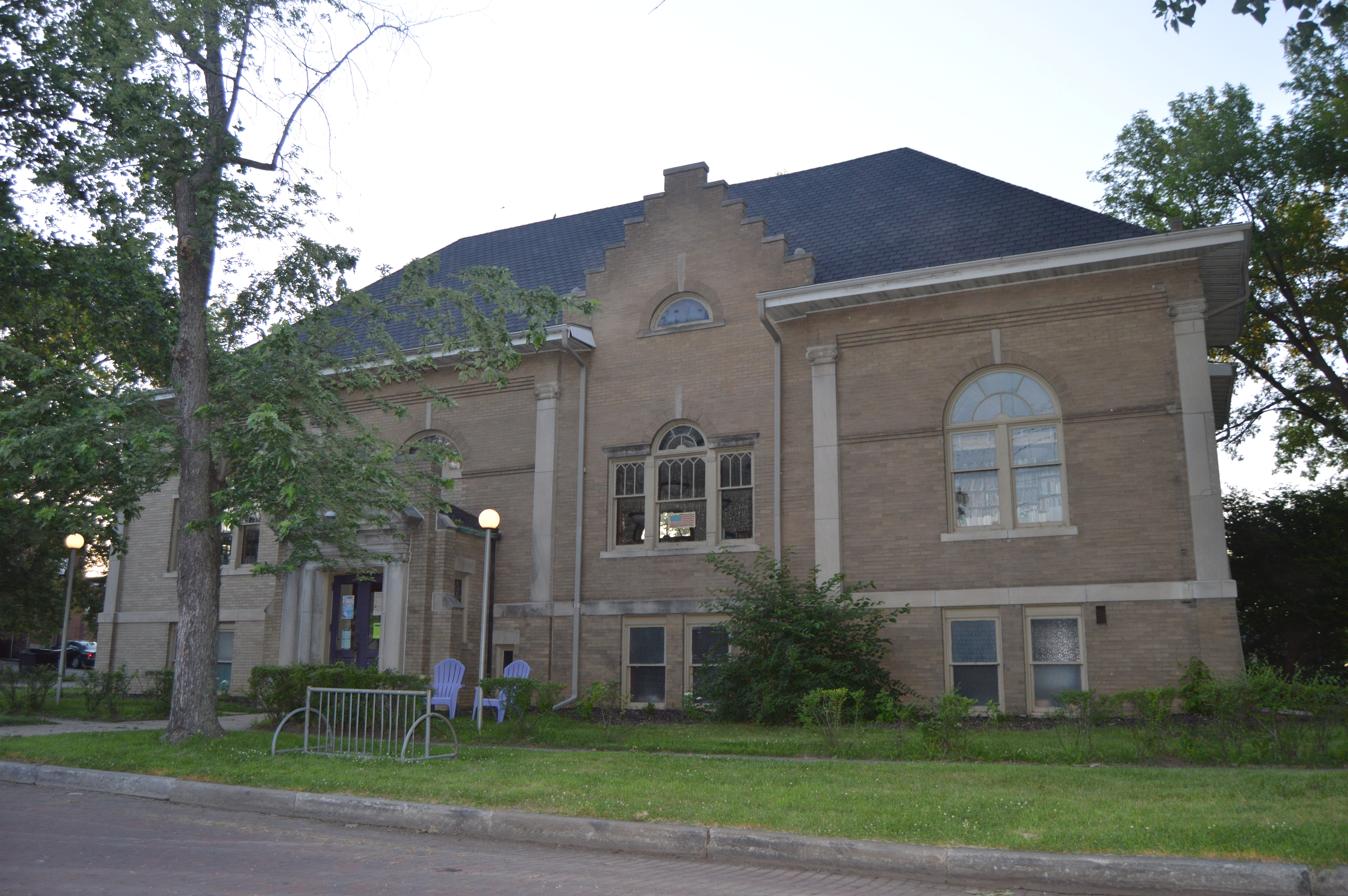

- Location within Illinois Location within the United States
- Location: 201 W. Adams St., Havana, Illinois
- Coordinates: 40°17′49″N 90°3′36″W
- Area: less than one acre
- Built: 1901
- Architect: C.E. Hair (1901 building); Deal and Ginzel (1937 addition)
- Architectural style: Classical Revival
- MPS: Illinois Carnegie Libraries MPS
- NRHP reference No.: 94000014
- Added to NRHP: February 16, 1994

The Havana Public Library is a Carnegie library located at 201 W. Adams St. in Havana, Illinois. The library was built in 1902 to house Havana's library program, which began in 1896 and was previously kept in a room of the city hall. The building's construction was funded by an $8,000 grant from the Carnegie Foundation as well as a local library tax. The blond brick building was designed in the Classical Revival style. The front of the building features four bays separated by five Ionic pilasters, an asymmetrical pedimented entrance, and a stepped parapet atop the entrance bay.

The library was added to the National Register of Historic Places on February 16, 1994.
