= Lincoln Public Library (Lincoln, Illinois) =

- U.S. National Register of Historic Places
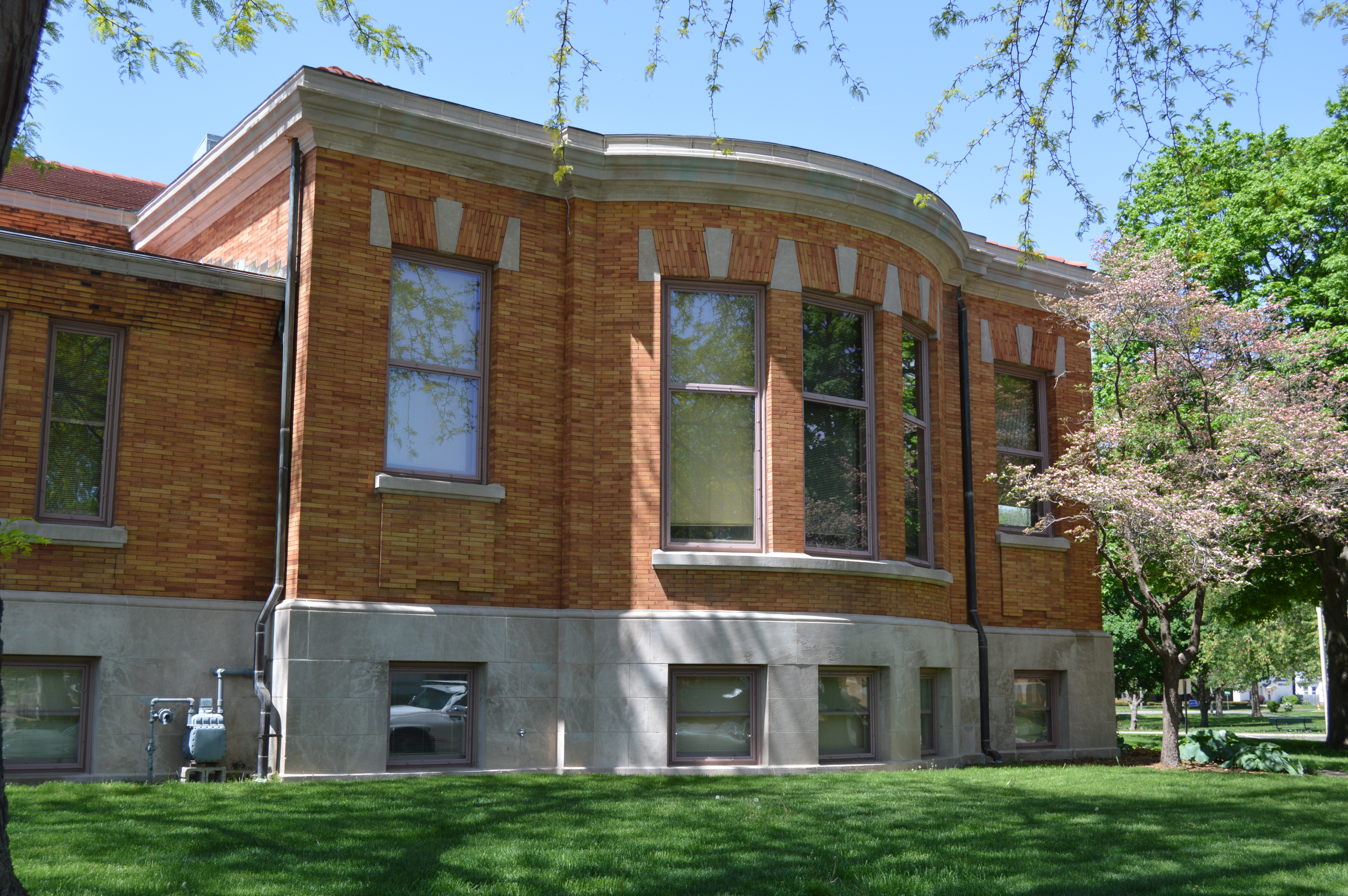
- Eastern side

- Location within Illinois Location within the United States
- Location: 725 Pekin St., Lincoln, Illinois
- Coordinates: 40°08′49″N 89°21′40″W
- Area: 0.6 acres (0.24 ha)
- Built: 1902
- Architect: Otis, W. A.
- Architectural style: Classical Revival
- NRHP reference No.: 80001384
- Added to NRHP: September 12, 1980

The Lincoln Public Library is a Carnegie library located at 725 Pekin St. in Lincoln, Illinois. Built in 1902, the library was funded by a $25,000 grant from the Carnegie Foundation. Chicago architect W. A. Otis designed the library in the Classical Revival style. The building's design features an entrance portico, a raised first floor, a Tuscan cornice, stone decorations, and a red tile roof. The portico includes four Tuscan columns, a pediment with its own cornice, a plinth, and acanthus decorations, and an oak double door with another cornice and an overhead window. The library has been continuously used since its opening.

The library was added to the National Register of Historic Places on September 12, 1980.
