= Scoville Memorial Library =

Scoville Memorial Library may refer to:

- Scoville Library, known also as Scoville Memorial Library, in Connecticut
- Scoville Memorial Library (Carleton College)
