= Normand Smith Patton =

American architect

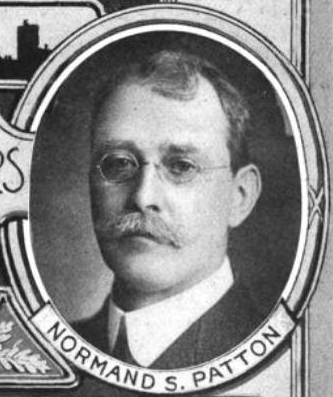
- Born: July 10, 1852; Hartford, Connecticut, U.S.
- Died: March 15, 1915 (aged 62); Chicago, IL
- Occupation: Architect
- Buildings: Armour Institute, 3300 S. Federal St., Chicago, IL, with Reynolds Fisher (1892-1893, extant.); The Chicago Academy of Sciences, 2001 N. Clark St., Chicago, IL, With Reynolds Fisher (pictured above, 1893, extant.)

Normand Smith Patton (July 10, 1852 – March 15, 1915) was an American architect based in Chicago, Illinois and Washington, D.C.

== Early life ==
Patton was born in Hartford, Connecticut, the son of the Reverend William Weston and Mary Boardman Patton (née Smith). He received a BA from Amherst College in 1873 and an MA in 1876, also from Amherst. He also attended the Massachusetts Institute of Technology while he pursued his graduate studies at Amherst.

== Architectural career ==
=== Practices ===
Patton began practicing architecture in Chicago in 1874, leaving in 1876 for Washington D.C. where he remained until 1883. He then returned to Chicago and shortly thereafter opened a practice with another architect, C.E. Randall. Randall died in 1885 but Patton's firm survived under various incarnations (as Patton & Fisher, then Patton, Fisher and Miller, then Patton & Miller, then Patton, Holmes & Flinn) until his death. As Patton & Miller, it designed over 100 Carnegie libraries around the country, making a specialty of designing libraries and other educational buildings.

During his time as a Chicago architect Patton maintained a residence at 225 Grove in the west suburban community of Oak Park (demolished) with his wife Fanny Maria (née Keep, 1856–1895) and their four children. His office was on South Dearborn Street in Chicago. In 1899 he was the president of the Chicago Chapter of the Illinois Institute of Architects.

=== Works ===
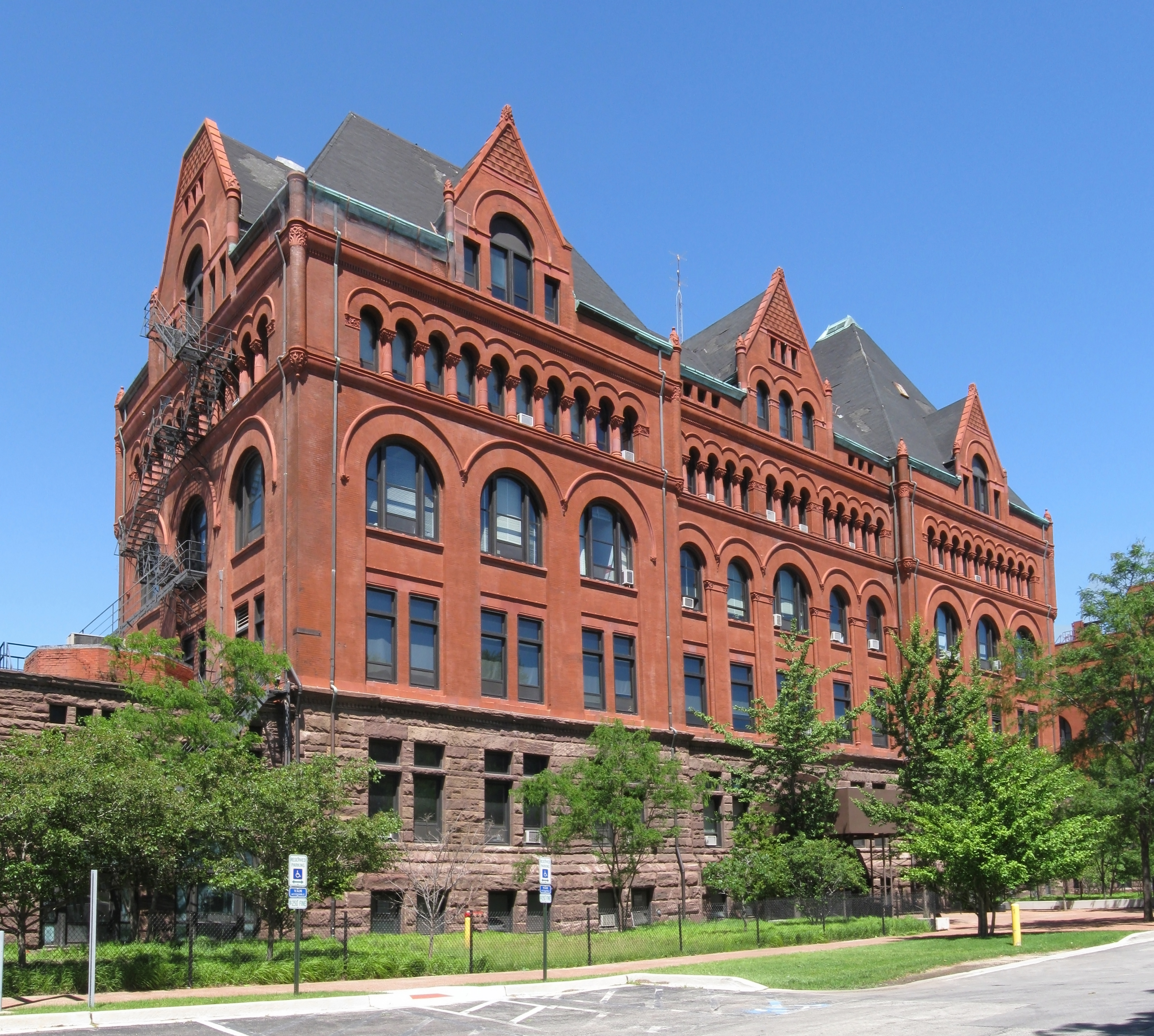
Armour Institute - Now Illinois Institute of Technology

Patton's firm specialized in public buildings and from 1896 to 1898 he was the architect for the Chicago Board of Education. Other noted architects from the period affiliated with the school board included August Fiedler (1893-1896), Robert Seyfarth (1895-?) and William B. Mundie (1898-1904). Patton and his firm were responsible for many public school buildings in Chicago and in other cities. He is responsible for the Fiske building on the Wichita State University campus. He also designed libraries at Oberlin College (1905-1908, Indiana University, and Augustana College. He was also responsible for the campus plan of Carleton College. He designed the Skinner Memorial Chapel at Carleton College but died before its completion.
