= Weitz Center for Creativity =

Academic building at Carleton College, Minnesota

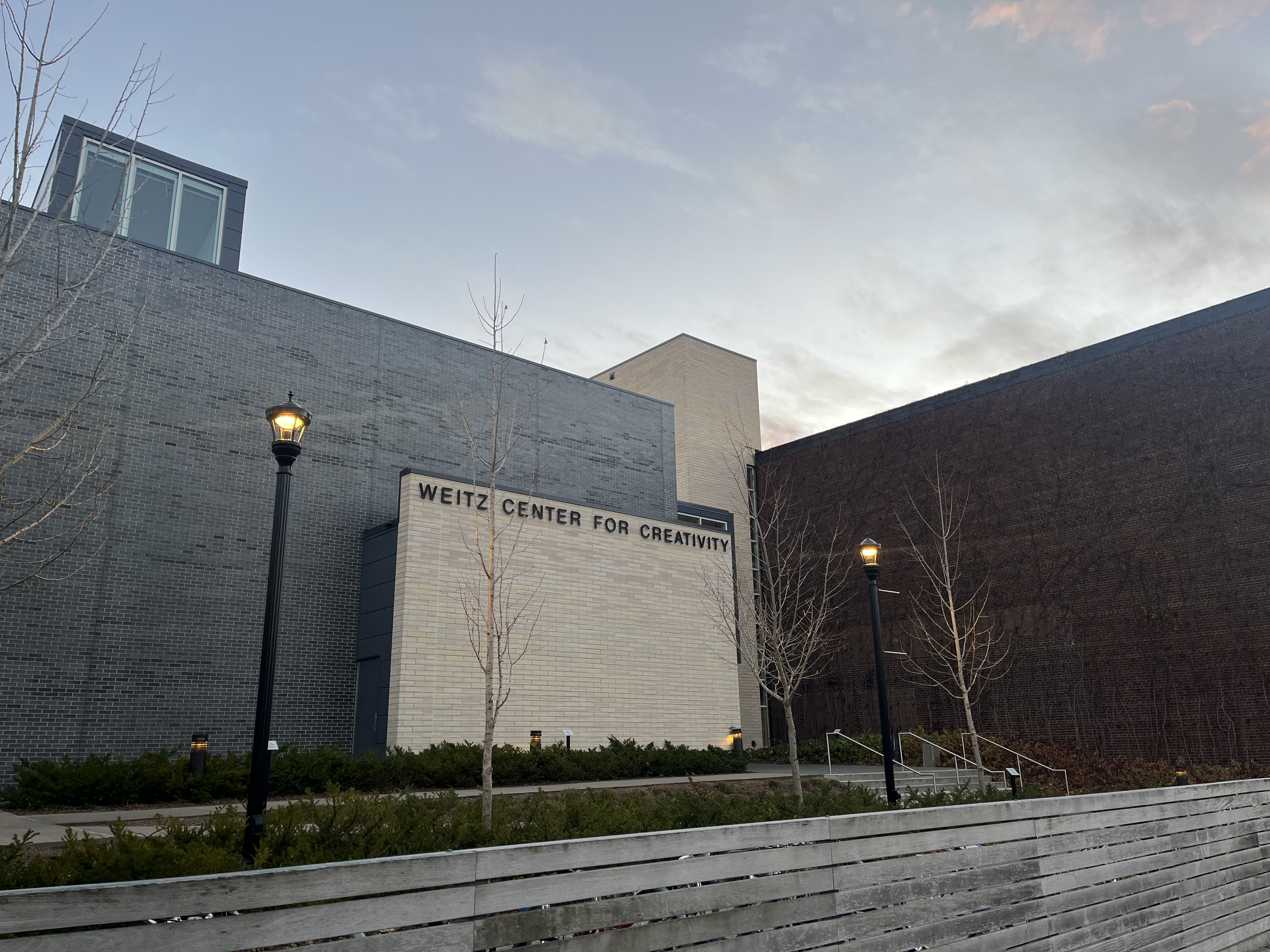
Main entrance to the new section of the Weitz Center

The Weitz Center for Creativity is an academic building at Carleton College, located in Northfield, Minnesota, United States. Formerly a middle school and high school, it opened in the fall of 2011. In addition to classrooms, the center houses the Perlman Teaching Museum, a theater, and two dance studios. In 2017, a new addition for music and performing arts was completed, adding a performance hall, rehearsal spaces, and faculty offices. The building is LEED gold certified.

The building was funded by Wally Weitz and the Weitz Family who have contributed over $45 million in total gifts to the college.
