= Skinner Memorial Chapel =

- Skinner Memorial Chapel--Carleton College
- U.S. National Register of Historic Places
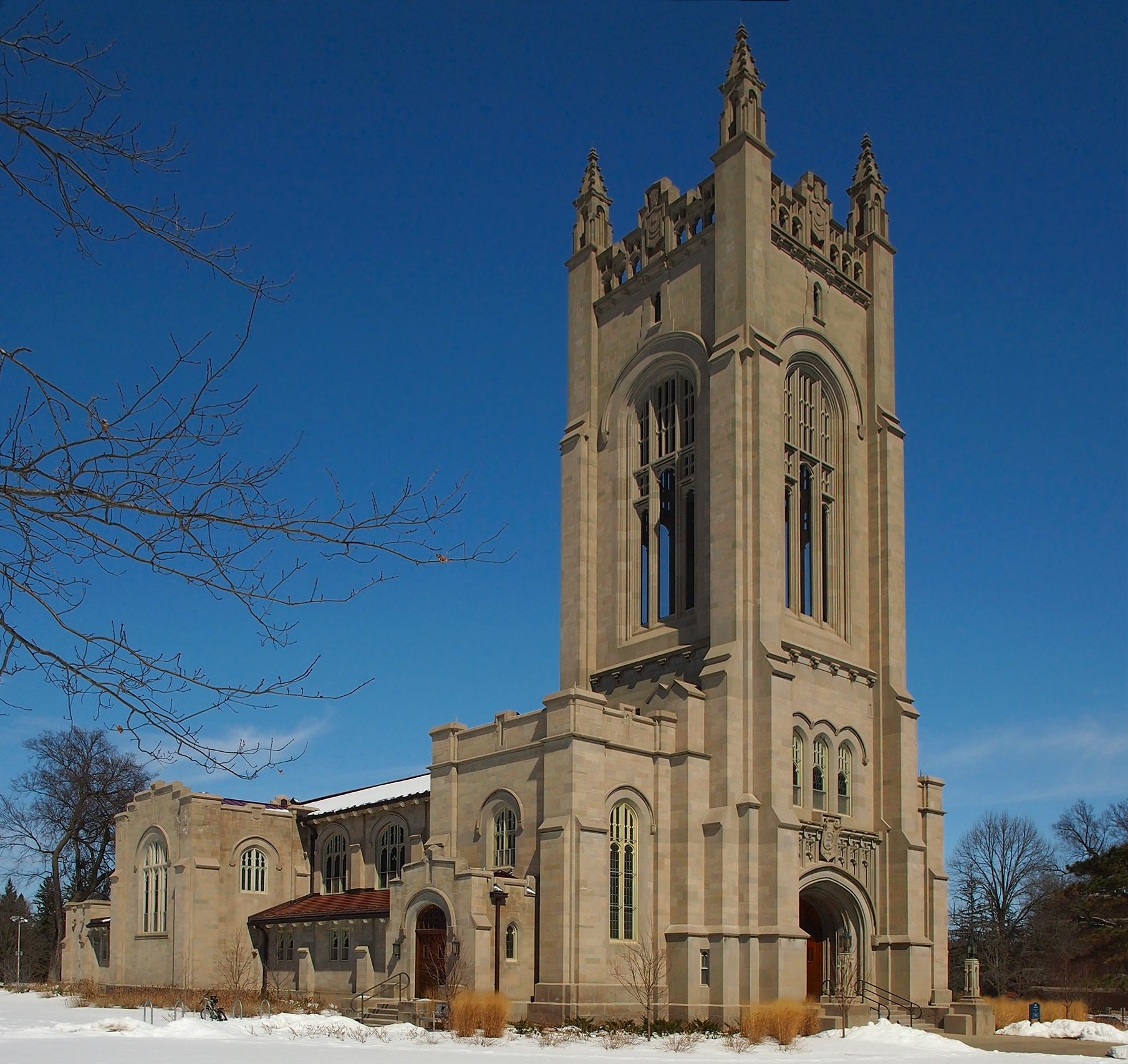
- Skinner Memorial Chapel from the southwest
- Location: 1st, Winona, and College Streets, Northfield, Minnesota
- Coordinates: 44°27′36″N 93°9′15″W
- Built: 1916
- Architect: Patton, Holmes & Flinn
- Architectural style: Late Gothic Revival
- MPS: Rice County MRA
- NRHP reference No.: 82003031
- Added to NRHP: April 6, 1982

Skinner Memorial Chapel is a chapel and historic building on the campus of Carleton College in Northfield, Minnesota, United States. It is listed on the National Register of Historic Places.

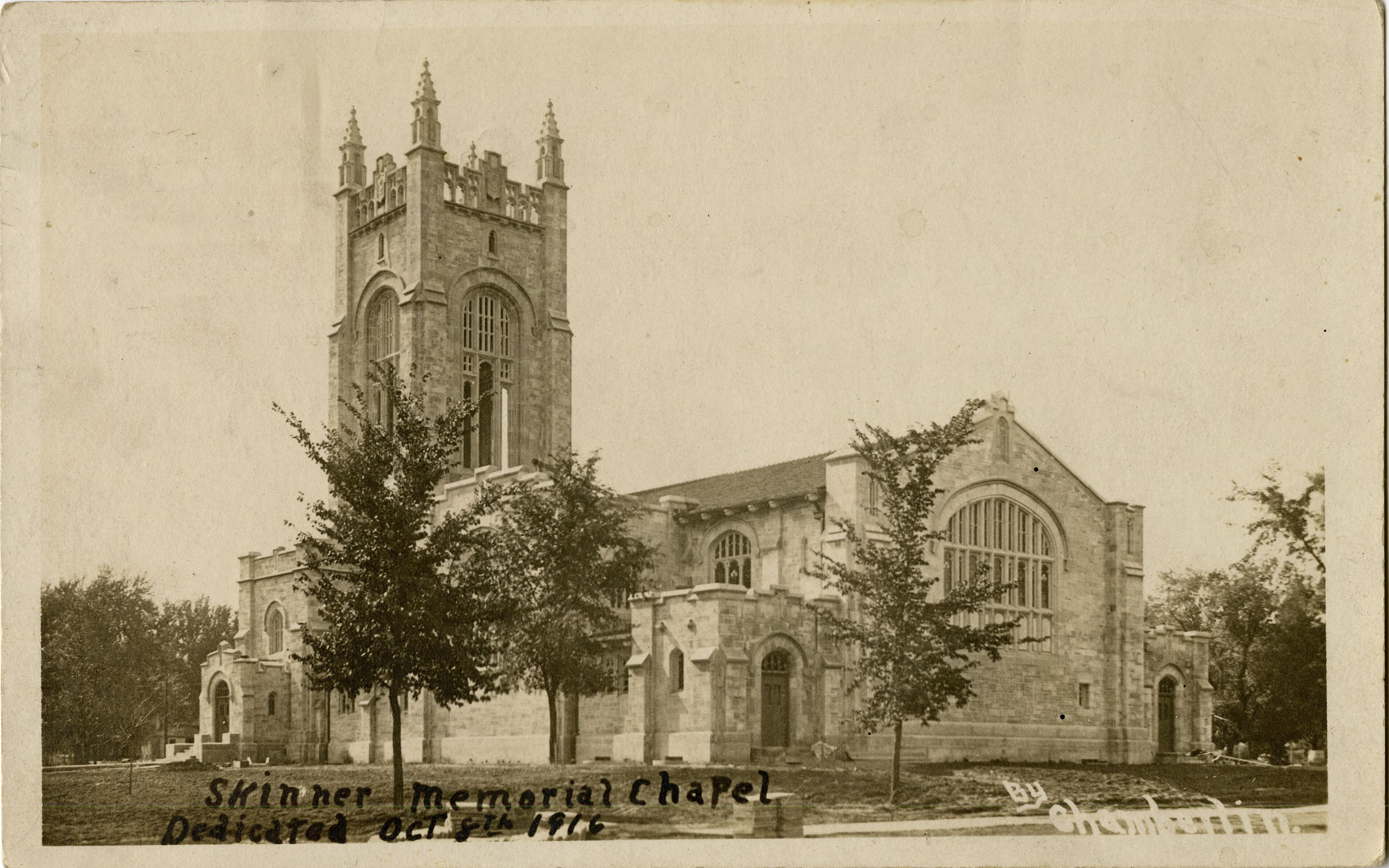
Skinner Memorial Chapel dedicated October 8, 1916

The chapel was built in 1916, fifty years after Carleton College was founded, and was financed by a gift from Emily Willey Skinner. Her husband, Miron Skinner, had been a trustee of the college until his death in 1909. The chapel was designed by the firm of Patton, Holmes & Flinn, who had organized an architectural plan for the college and designed eight other buildings. The chapel is of English Gothic Revival design, with a Latin cross shape and a tall bell tower. The interior has a dark wood ceiling with dark beams.

It hosts services from a variety of religious traditions as well as weekly Carleton functions.
