= Jo Ryo En Japanese Garden =

Japanese garden in Minnesota, US

Coordinates: 44.4592°N 93.1497°W

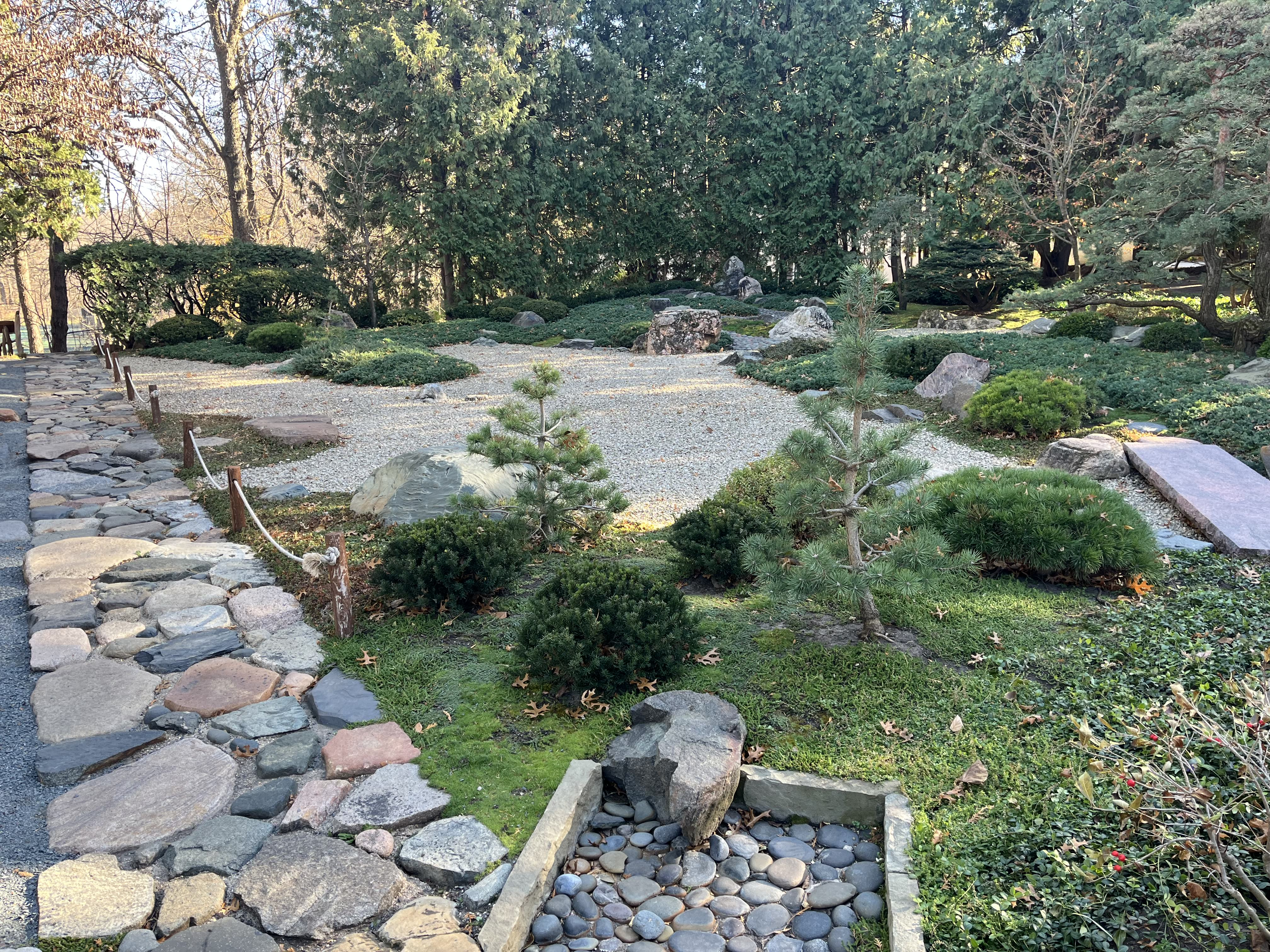
The nobedan (stone path) and landscape in November

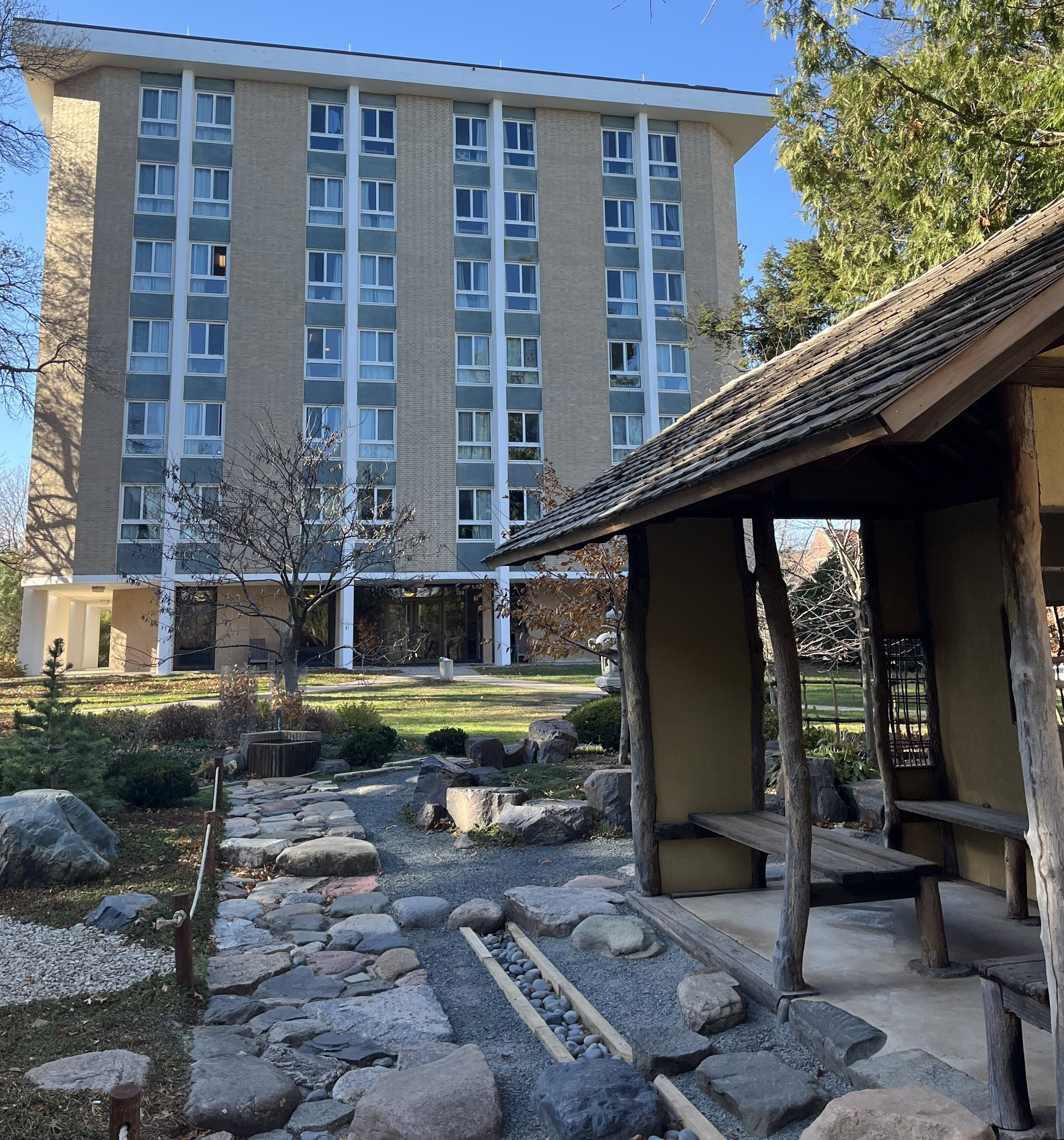
The entrance to and viewing pavilion of the garden, with Minoru Yamasaki's Watson Hall in the background

The Jo Ryo En Japanese Garden is a Japanese garden located on the campus of Carleton College in Northfield, Minnesota, USA. Commonly translated as the "garden of quiet listening," the garden is a small (1/4 acre) setting located behind Watson Hall on the Carleton College campus.

The garden was conceived and built between 1974 and 1976, under the design guidance of David Slawson. Instigation for the design and construction for the garden came from Bardwell Smith, the John W. Nason Professor Emeritus of Asian Studies at Carleton College.

The garden is in the style of a karesansui or dry landscape garden, and contains several features:

- stone lanterns
- a bamboo drip and basin
- paved stone path (nobedan)
- viewing pavilion
- rock simulating a stream of dark, flat stones emptying into a lake of white gravel
- rocks, low shrubs, and trees to simulate hills and mountains

Entrance to the garden is free.

In 2000, the garden was named one of the 10 highest-quality gardens outside Japan by the Journal of Japanese Gardening.
