= The Cave (pub) =

Music and entertainment venue in Minnesota

- Interactive map of The Cave
- Location: Carleton College Northfield, MN
- Coordinates: 44.460618°N 93.149868°W
- Seating type: standing room with limited lounge seating
- Capacity: 150
- Type: Music venue
- Event: Various

Construction
- Opened: 1927

Website
- http://orgs.carleton.edu/cave

The Cave is a student-led music and entertainment venue, located at Carleton College. It is a favorite gathering place for students at Carleton College and is one of a limited number of music venues in Northfield, Minnesota. Founded in 1927, it is the oldest student-run pub in America and is housed on the lowest level of the Margaret Evans residence hall.

The Cave has undergone many transformations over the decades: from lounge, to cabaret-style theater, to game room and finally, a music venue. The Cave stopped serving alcohol in 2013, although of-age students can bring their own alcohol.

The Cave is open Tuesday-Saturday for Carleton students during the academic term. There are typically several shows each week, most often on Friday and Saturday nights. A Carleton College ID card is usually required for entry, but there are sometimes shows that are open to the public.

== Notable guests and performers ==
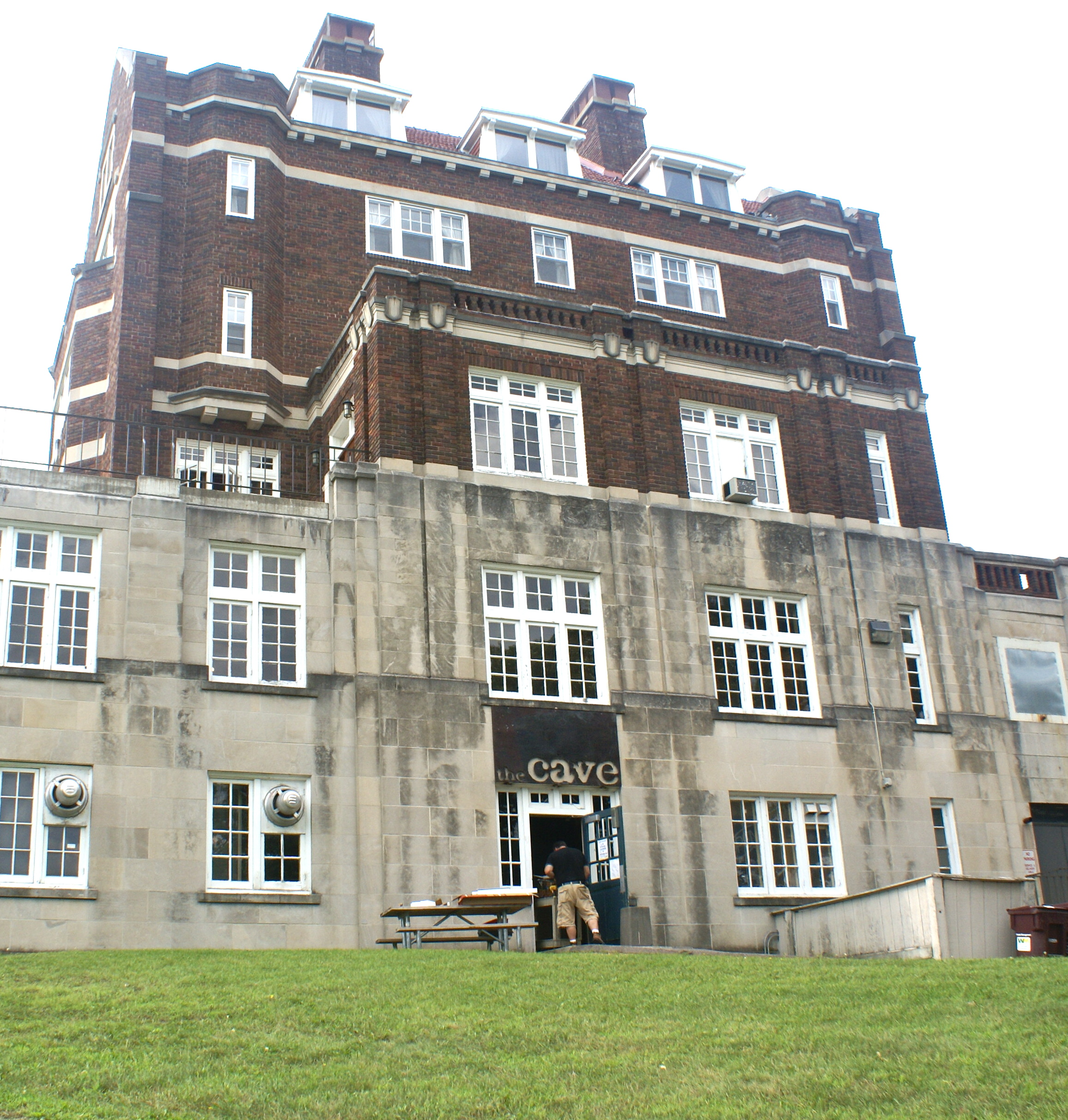
The Cave is in the basement of Margaret Evans dormitory at Carleton College in Northfield, MN.

The Cave has hosted a number of distinguished musicians, guests, and performers over the years.

=== Musicians ===
- Angel Olsen
- Ani DiFranco
- Armand Hammer
- Car Seat Headrest
- Caroline Smith
- Chairlift
- Dan Deacon
- Das Racist
- Deeper
- Disq
- Doomtree
- Explosions in the Sky
- Finom
- Florry
- Frankie Cosmos
- Friko
- Fust
- Gear Daddies
- Graham Hunt
- Guided by Voices
- Haley Bonar
- Haley Heynderickx
- Har Mar Superstar
- Homeshake
- Indigo Girls
- Jens Lekman
- The Jesus Lizard
- The Slaps
- Little Dragon
- Lifeguard
- Low
- Lutalo
- Mal Blum
- Mark Mallman
- Merce Lemon
- Mei Semones
- milo
- Phish
- Sharp Pins
- She's Green
- Soul Asylum
- Squirrel Flower
- Sword II
- Tapes 'n Tapes
- Toro y Moi
- Ty Segall
- Wilco
- Wye Oak

=== Spoken word ===
- Andrea Gibson
- Darkmatter
- Sarah Kay
