= Willis Hall (Carleton College) =

- Willis Hall--Carleton College
- U.S. National Register of Historic Places
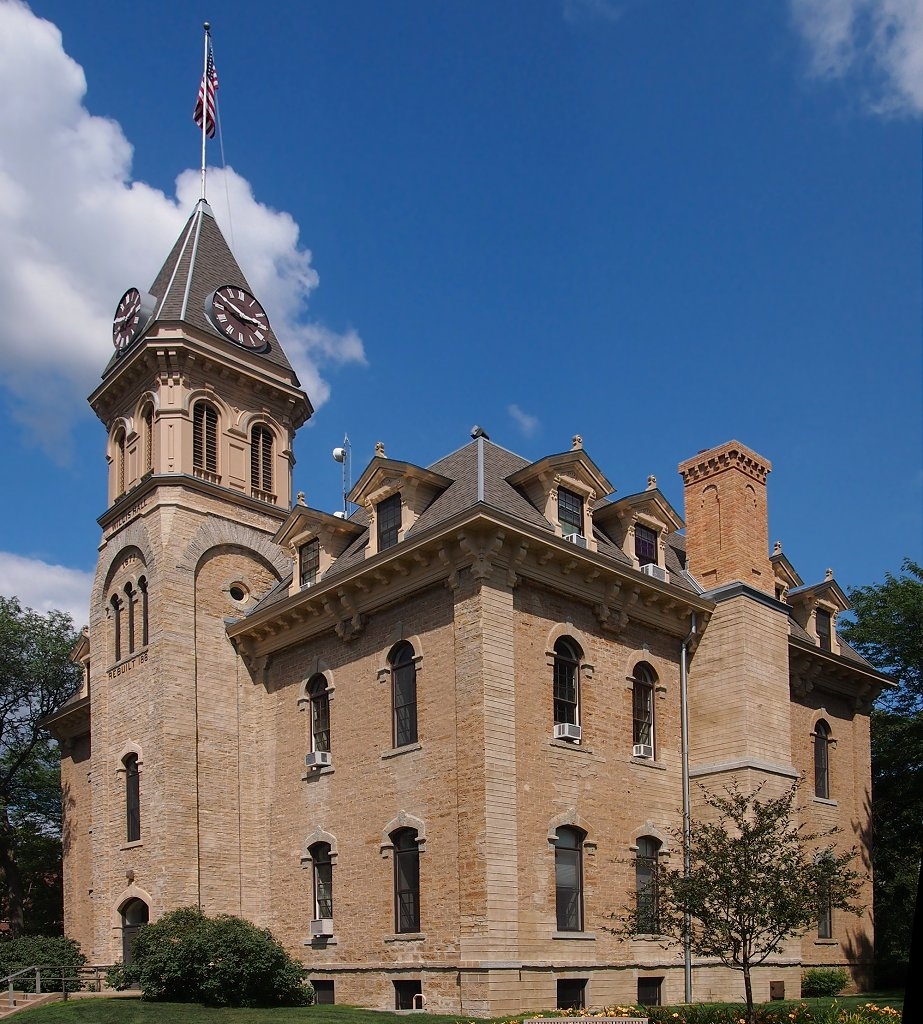
- Willis Hall viewed from the southwest

- Location within Minnesota Location within the United States
- Location: College Street, Northfield, Minnesota
- Coordinates: 44°27′38″N 93°9′21″W
- Built: 1868–72
- Architect: D. C. Hill
- Architectural style: Second Empire
- NRHP reference No.: 75001026
- Added to NRHP: June 13, 1975

Willis Hall is a historic building on the campus of Carleton College in Northfield, Minnesota, United States. It is listed on the National Register of Historic Places.

== History ==
=== 19th Century ===
Willis Hall was the first building specifically built for the college. The first students started attending classes at the former American House hotel in Northfield in 1867, but the building had some serious mechanical problems. Construction of a new building began in 1868, but construction was slow and halted before the building could be erected due to a lack of funds. The president of the college, James W. Strong, traveled to New England in 1870 for a fundraising tour. After Strong was injured in a railroad accident and subsequently recovered from his injuries, benefactor William Carleton donated $50,000 to the college to ensure its survival. His wife, Susan Willis Carleton, donated $10,000 to help clear the construction debt of the college's first permanent building. The building was named Willis Hall in her honor. It was designed in the French Second Empire style by a prominent Minneapolis architecture firm, Alden and Howe. The upper floor was a men's dormitory, the first floor was a chapel, and the rest of the building was used for lecture space and a library.

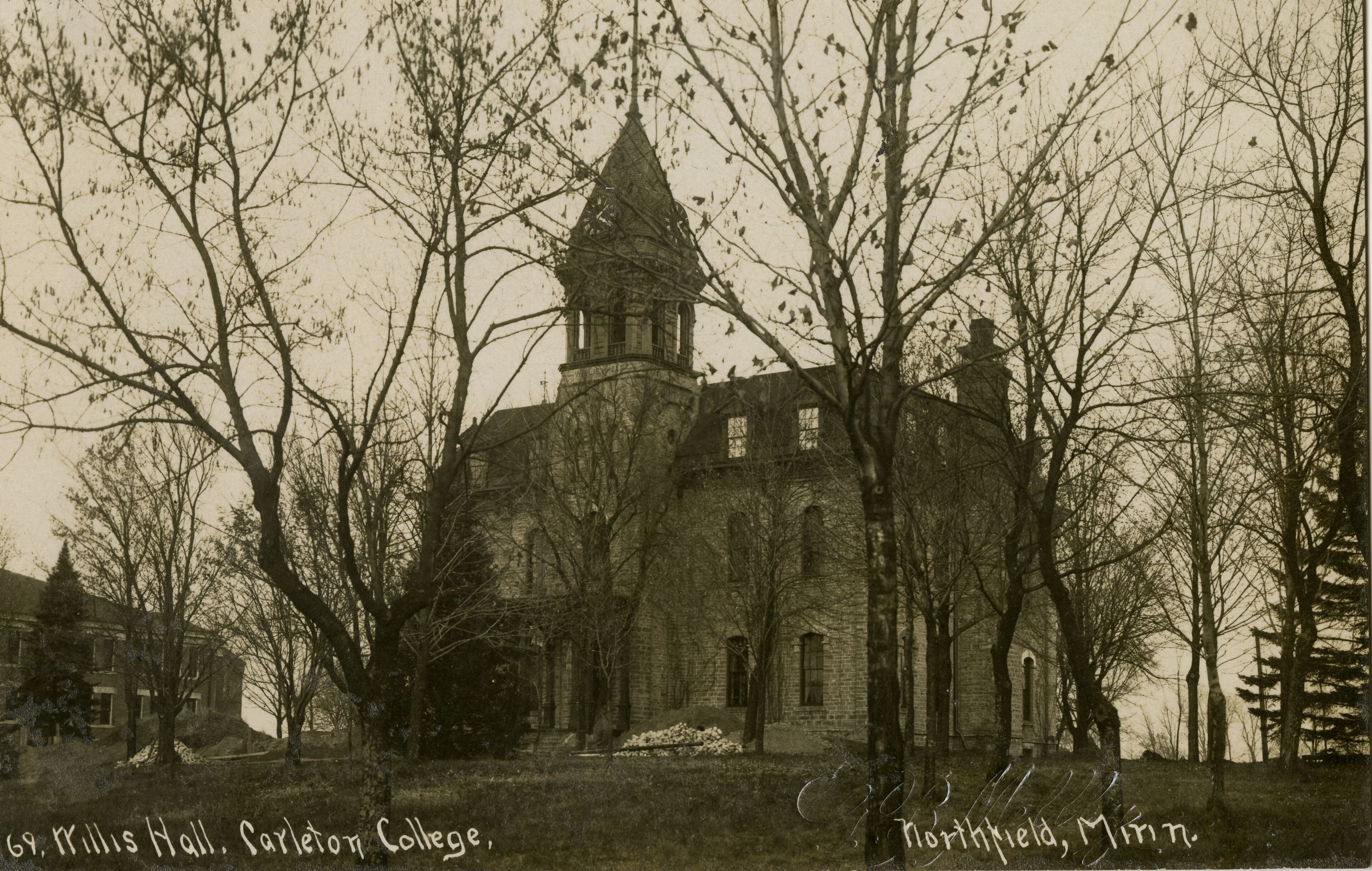
Exterior view of Willis Hall with Sayles-Hill Gymnasium on the Carleton College campus, 1909-1910

On December 23 1879, a fire ravaged the building, gutting it entirely. It was rebuilt with minor changes to the exterior, as well as improvements to the chapel, a new classroom, and a furnace.

=== 20th & 21st Centuries ===
From 1954 to 1979, Willis officially operated as the campus student union, and it housed the campus bookstore, the post office, a game room, a darkroom, lounges, and the KARL radio station (now known as KRLX).

Currently, the building houses the following departments:

- American Studies
- Economics
- Educational Studies
- Environmental Studies
- Linguistics
