= Patton & Fisher =

American architectural firm

Patton & Fisher was an architectural firm in Chicago, Illinois. It operated under that name from 1885 to 1899 and later operated under the names Patton, Fisher & Miller (1899–1901) and Patton & Miller (1901–1915). Several of its works are listed on the National Register of Historic Places.

== Firm history ==
The firm of Patton & Fisher was established in 1885 by architects Normand Smith Patton (July 10, 1852 - May 12, 1915) and Reynolds Fisher. The firm continued to operate under that name until 1899. In 1899, the firm became Patton, Fisher & Miller when Grant C. Miller became a partner. In 1901, Fisher left the practice, and the firm became known as Patton & Miller. Normand Patton was a partner in the firm during its entire existence from 1885 until his death in 1915. Patton was also a Fellow of the American Institute of Architects.

The firm has several works that are listed on the National Register of Historic Places.

== Works ==
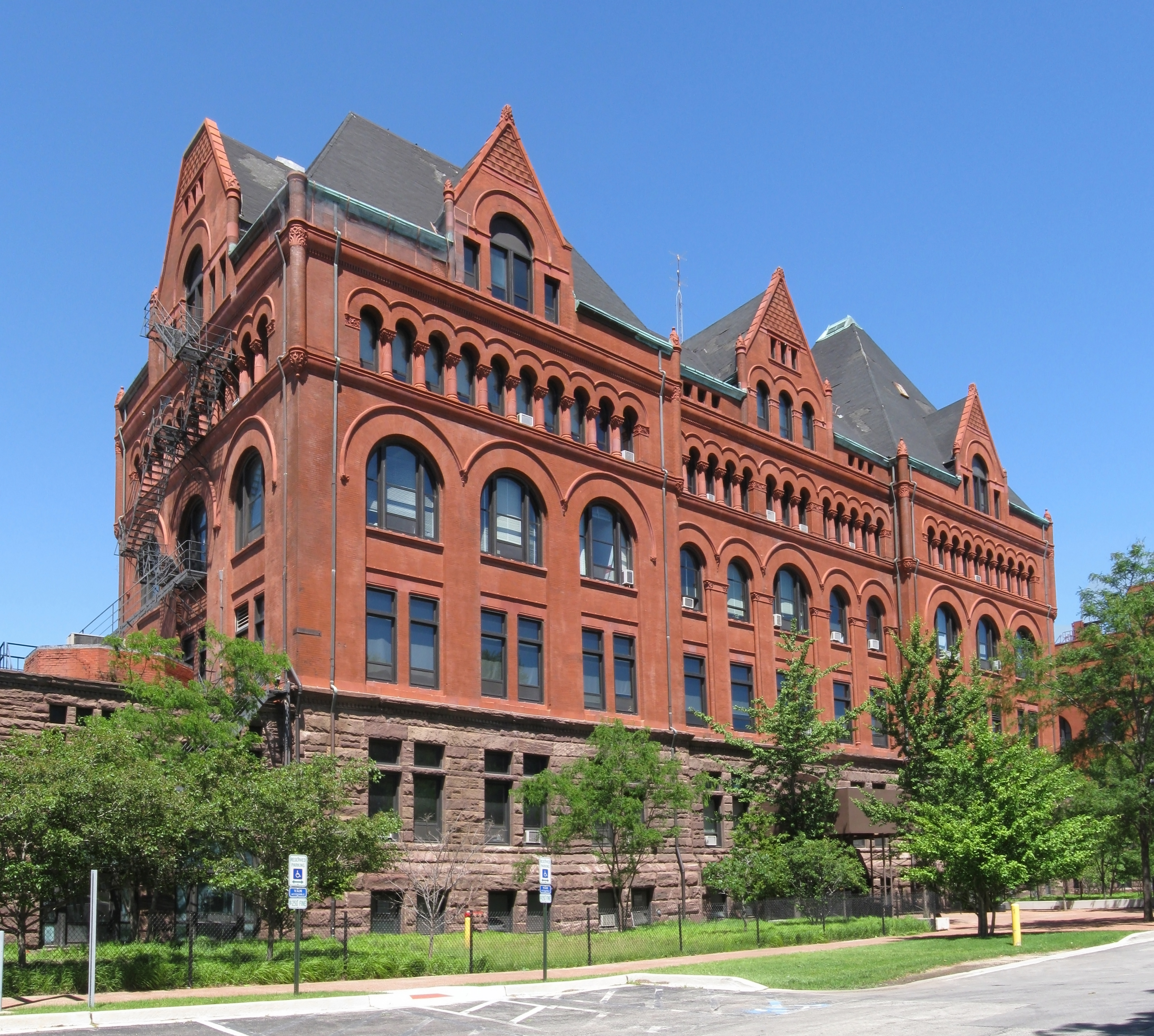
Main Building of Armour Institute

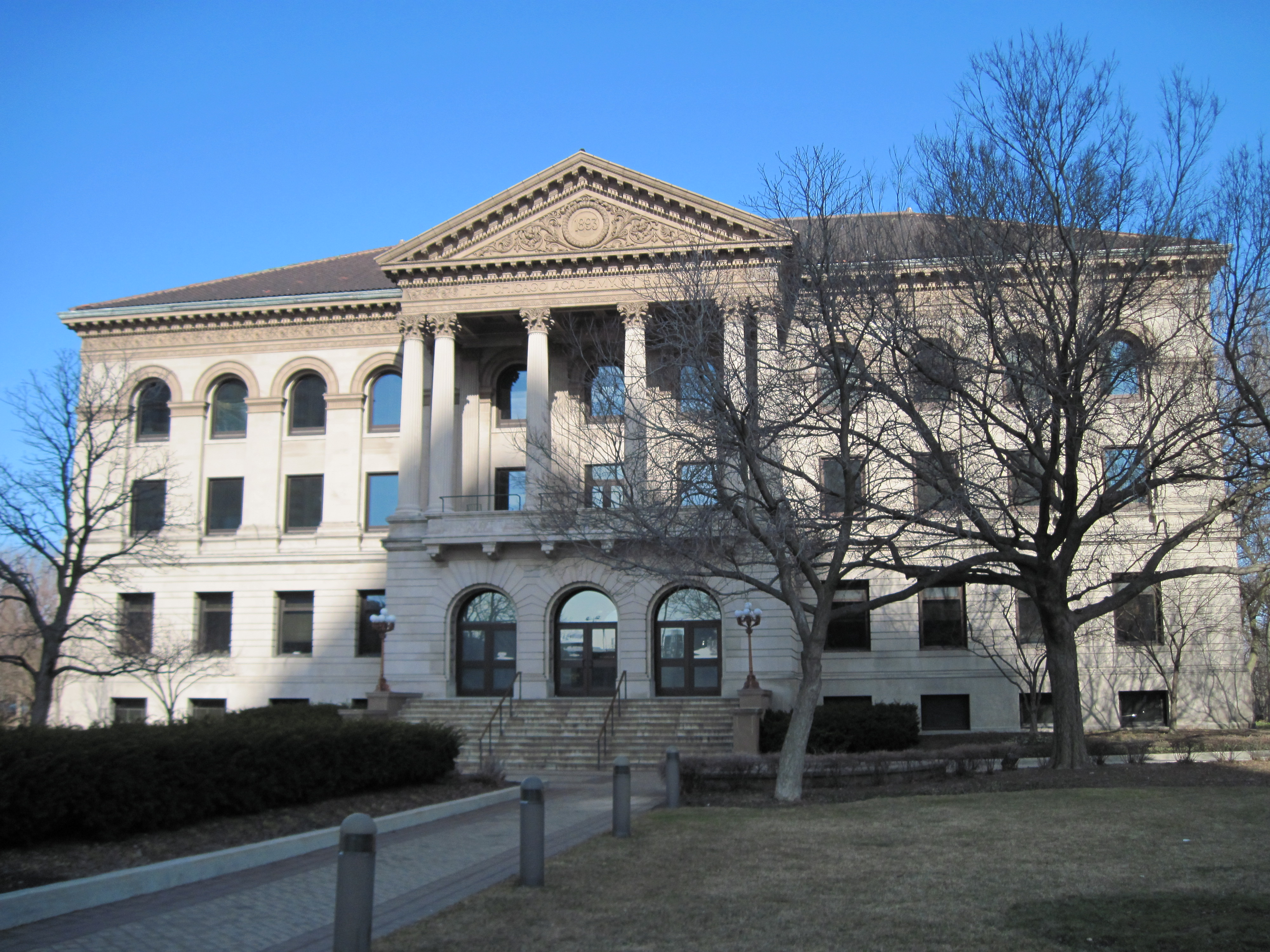
Matthew Lafflin Memorial Building

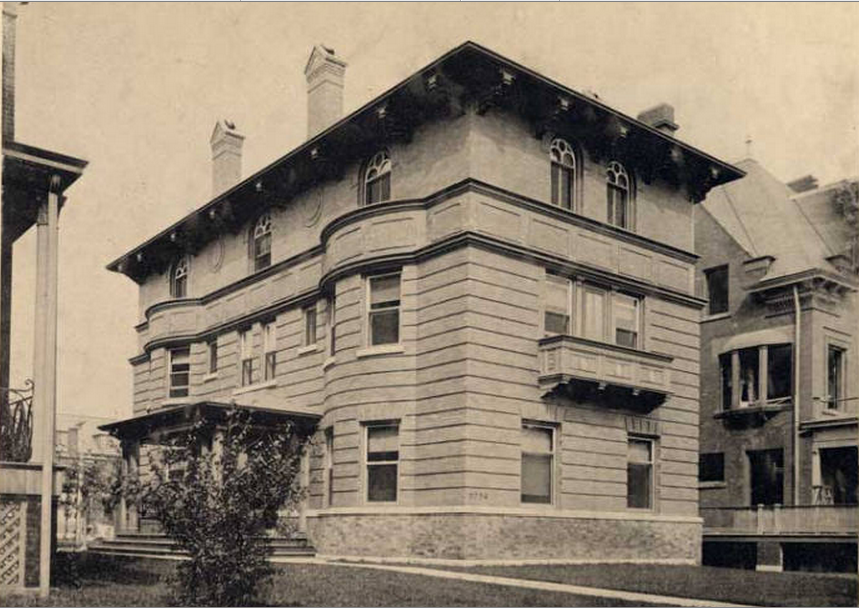
Jacques Loeb Residence

The works of Patton & Fisher and successor firms include:

=== Patton & Fisher ===
==== Chicago ====
- Belmonte Flats (1893), 4257-4259 S. Dr. Martin Luther King Jr. Dr., and 400-412 E. 43rd St., Chicago, Illinois (Patton and Fisher), NRHP-listed
- Chicago Theological Seminary, Chicago
- Henry H. Donaldson Residence (1895), 5740 Woodlawn Avenue, Chicago
- Erie Apartment Building (1891), later the Hotel Dana Hotel, 666 N. State St., Chicago, built 1891, demolished 2006
- First Baptist Church of Hyde Park
- Reynolds Fisher House (1890), 4734 North Kimbark Avenue, Chicago
- Richard Norman Foster House (1892), 1532 West Jackson Boulevard, Chicago
- Joseph H. Howard House (1891), 4801 North Kimbark Avenue, Chicago
- Illinois Institute of Technology, formerly Armour Institute of Technology: Machinery Hall (1901) and the Main Building (1891–1893), 3300 S. Federal Street, Chicago
- The Kenwood Club (1896), Chicago (Patton & Fisher with Charles S. Frost)
- Lincoln Park Zoo Headquarters (1893), formerly the Matthew Lafflin Memorial Building at the Chicago Academy of Sciences, 2001 North Clark Street, Chicago
- Jacques Loeb Residence (c. 1896), 5754 Woodlawn Avenue, Chicago
- Newberry Hotel (c. 1891), 817 N. Dearborn St., Chicago, demolished 1960s
- W. S. Walker Residences (1887), block of four houses on Ellis Avenue near 37th Street, Chicago
- Washington Park Congregational Church (1896), 129 E. 51st St. (originally 1010 E. 51st St.), Chicago

==== Oak Park ====
- Cicero Gas Company Building (1893), 115 N. Oak Park Avenue, Oak Park, Illinois
- William A. Douglas House (1893), 317 North Kenilworth Avenue, Oak Park, Illinois
- David J. Kennedy House (1888), 309 North Kenilworth Avenue, Oak Park, Illinois
- Walter Thomas Mills House (1897), 601 North Kenilworth Avenue, Oak Park, Illinois
- Pilgrim Congregational Church (1889, 1899), 460 West Lake Street, Chicago (south half by Patton & Fisher, 1889; north half by Patton, Fisher & Miller, 1899)
- John Rankin House (1891), 245 N. Kenilworth Avenue, Oak Park, Illinois
- Scoville Block (1899), 116-132 N. Oak Park Avenue, Oak Park, Illinois
- Scoville Institute, later known as Oak Park Public Library, Oak Park, Illinois
- Second Congregational Church, Chicago (Patton & Fisher; and Patton, Fisher & Miller)
- Richard S. Thain Residence, Oak Park, Illinois

==== Beloit ====
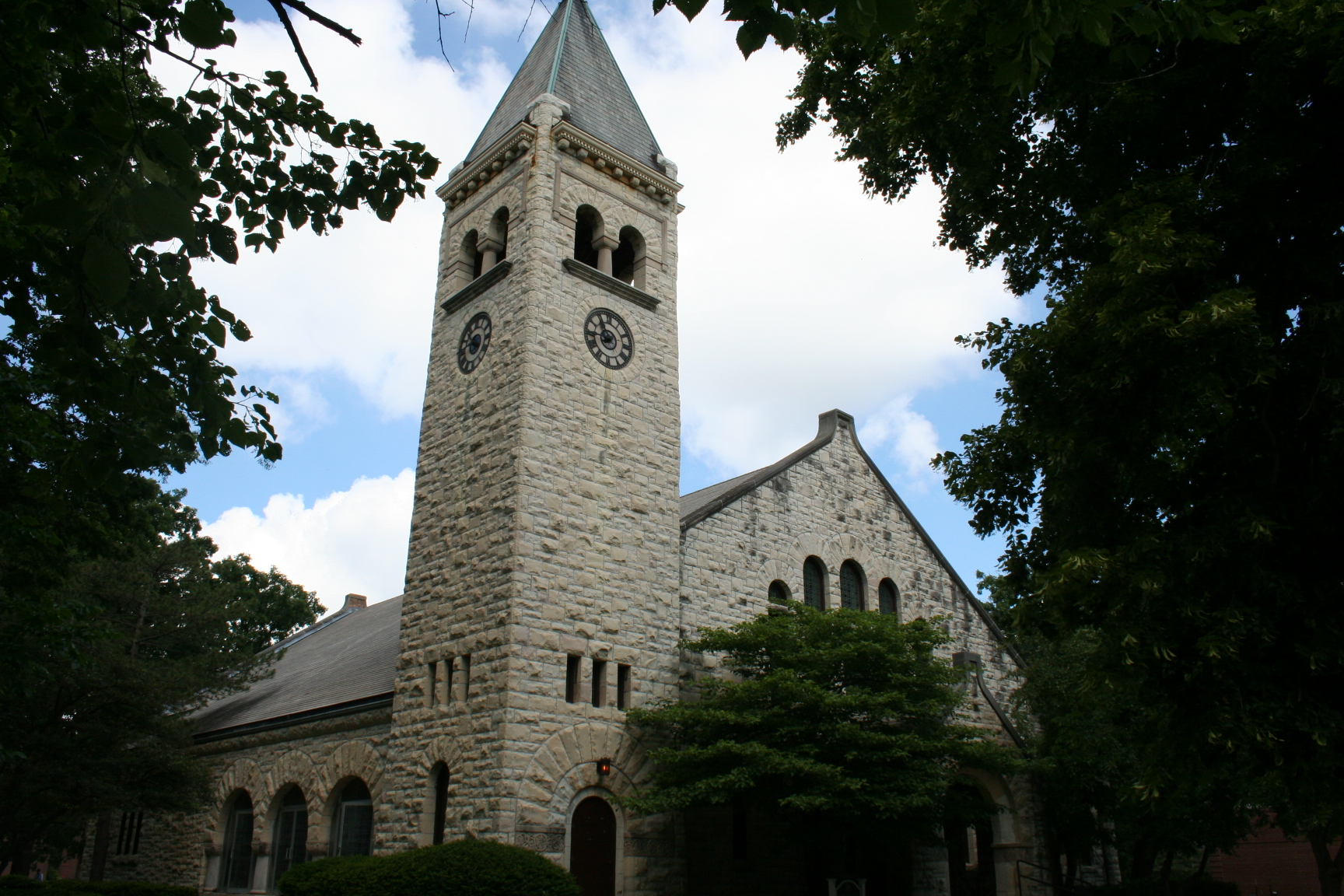
Eaton Chapel at Beloit College

- Beloit College Academy, Beloit, Wisconsin
- Beloit College, Edward Dwight Eaton Chapel (1891-1892), Beloit, Wisconsin (renovations in 1938 and 1954 designed by Maurice Webster)
- Beloit College, Emerson Hall (1897-1898), Beloit, Wisconsin (Patton & Fisher), NRHP-listed (converted into a senior citizen apartment center in 1982)
- Beloit College, Scoville Hall (1889-1890), Beloit, Wisconsin (demolished in 1973)
- Beloit College, Smith Gymnasium Building, Beloit, Wisconsin

==== Muskegon and Kalamazoo ====
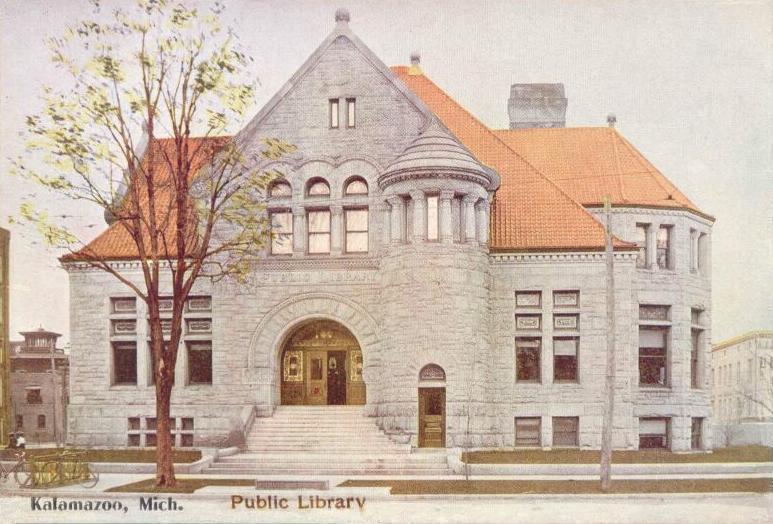
Old Kalamazoo Public Library

- Hackley Library (1889), Muskegon, Michigan
- Hackley Manual Training School (1897), Muskegon, Michigan
- Kalamazoo Public Library (1891-1893), Kalamazoo, Michigan
- Muskegon High School, Muskegon, Michigan

==== Elsewhere ====
Former public library in Quincy

- Gardner Museum of Architecture and Design (1888), originally the Free Public Library, 32 Maine Street, Quincy, Illinois
- James W. Ridgway Residence (1888), Hinsdale, Illinois
- Scoville Memorial Library-Carleton College (1896), renamed Scoville Hall in 1957, 1st St., E. and College St., Northfield, Minnesota (Patton & Fisher), NRHP-listed
- State Savings Loan and Trust, 428 Maine St., Quincy, Illinois (Patton & Fisher), NRHP-listed
- Wichita State University, Fairmount College of Liberal Arts and Sciences (c. 1888), Wichita, Kansas
- Williston Hall at Wheaton College (1895), Wheaton, Illinois

=== Patton, Fisher & Miller ===
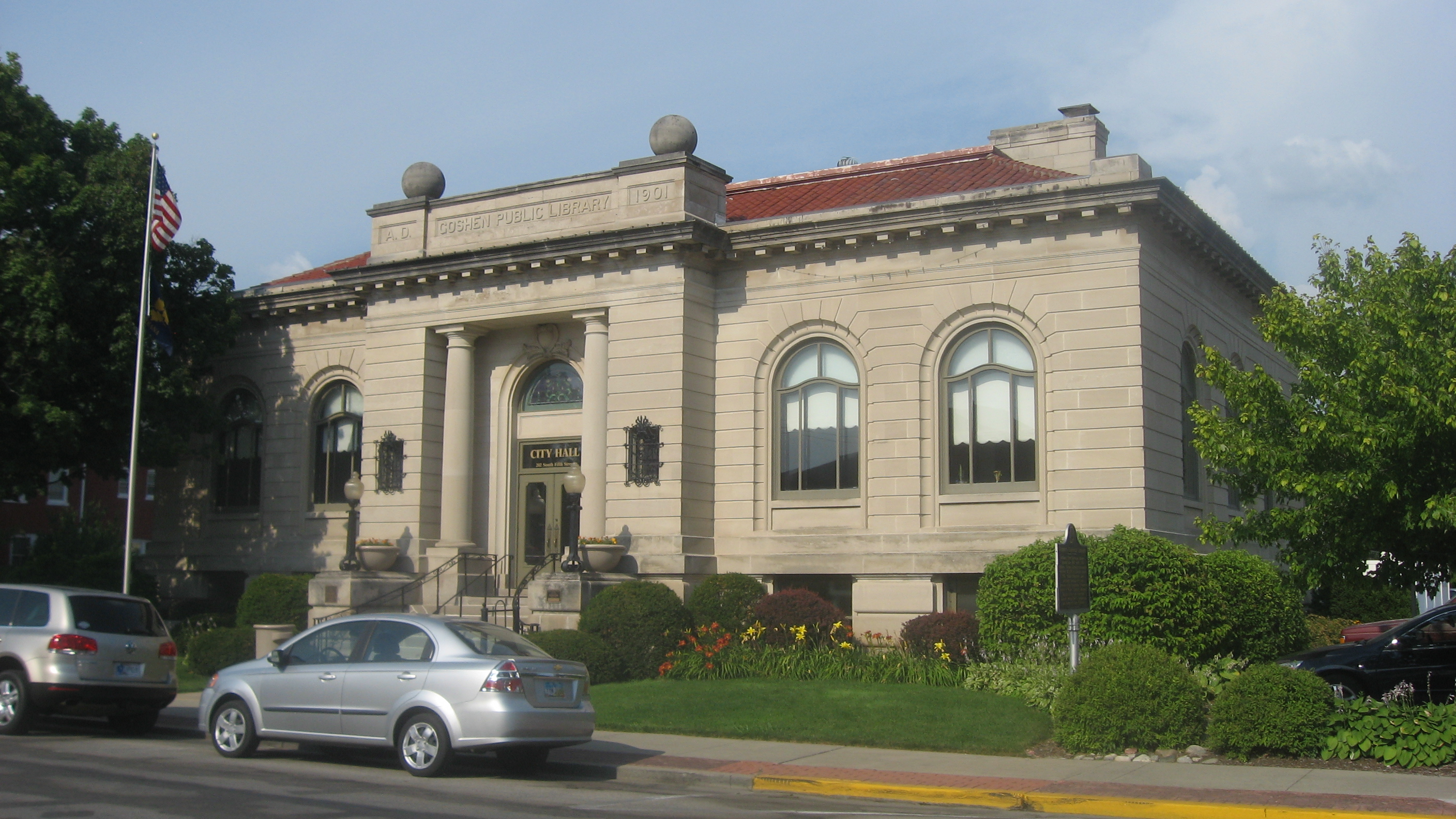
Goshen Carnegie Library

- Goshen Carnegie Public Library (1901), 202 South 5th St., Goshen, Indiana (Patton, Fisher & Miller), NRHP-listed (Indiana's first Carnegie library)
- Memorial Baptist Church, Chicago (Patton, Fisher & Miller)
- Monumental Baptist Church, Chicago (Patton, Fisher & Miller)

=== Patton & Miller ===
- See Patton & Miller

== See also ==
- Patton & Miller
- Normand Smith Patton
