= Scoville Memorial Library (Carleton College) =

- Scoville Memorial Library-Carleton College
- U.S. National Register of Historic Places
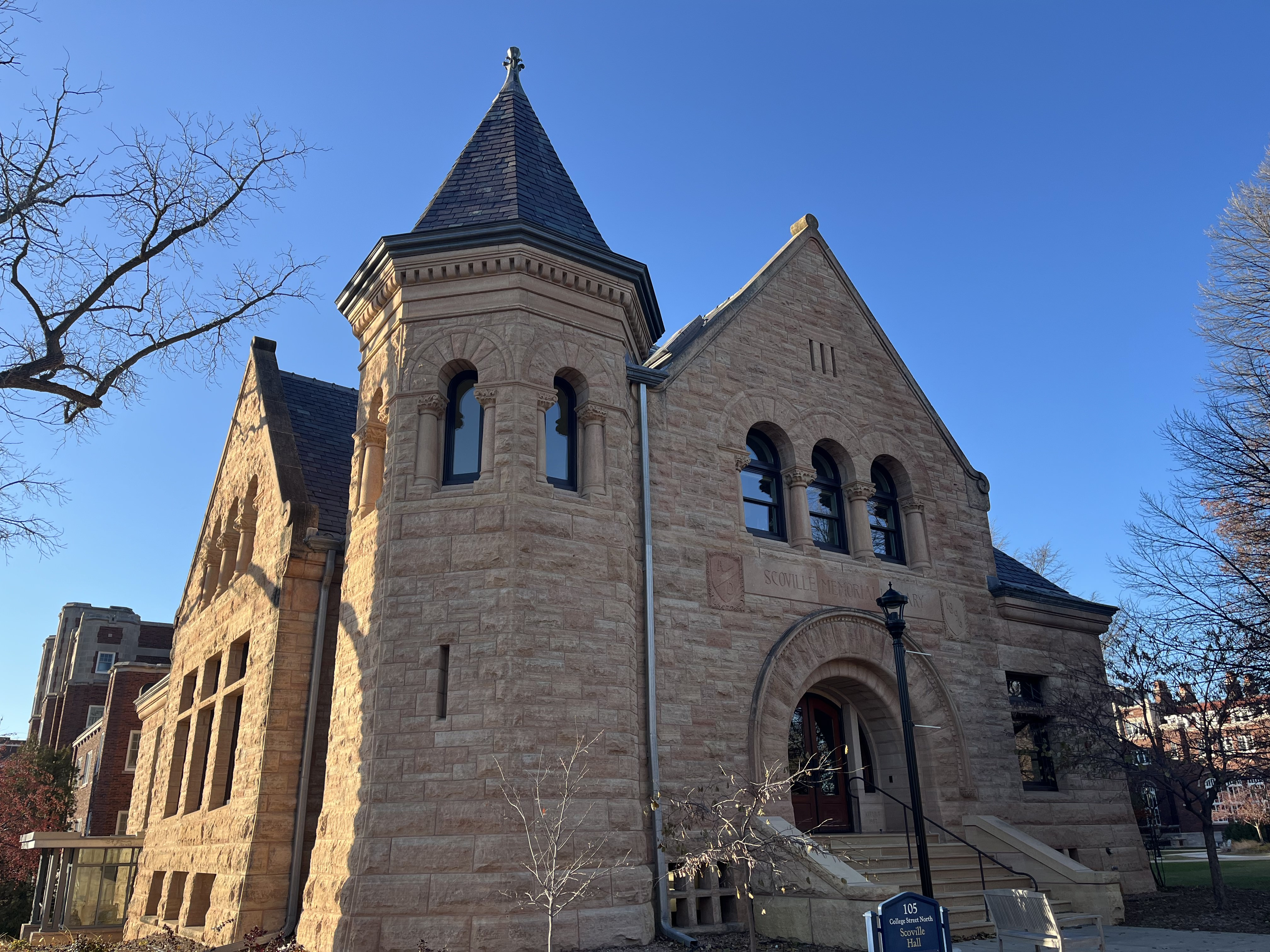
- Scoville Memorial Library from the southeast

- Location within Minnesota Location within the United States
- Location: 1st St., E. and College St. Northfield, Minnesota
- Coordinates: 44°27′36″N 93°9′20″W
- Built: 1896
- Architect: Patton & Fisher; D.H. Lord
- Architectural style: Richardsonian Romanesque
- MPS: Rice County MRA
- NRHP reference No.: 82003030
- Added to NRHP: April 6, 1982

Scoville Memorial Library is a historic building on the campus of Carleton College in Northfield, Minnesota, United States. It is listed on the National Register of Historic Places. It was the college's library until the current library was built in the 1950s. Until 2016 it housed several student support organizations and the Cinema and Media Studies department. The building underwent extensive renovations for restoration and accessibility and currently houses the Admissions and Financial Aid offices.

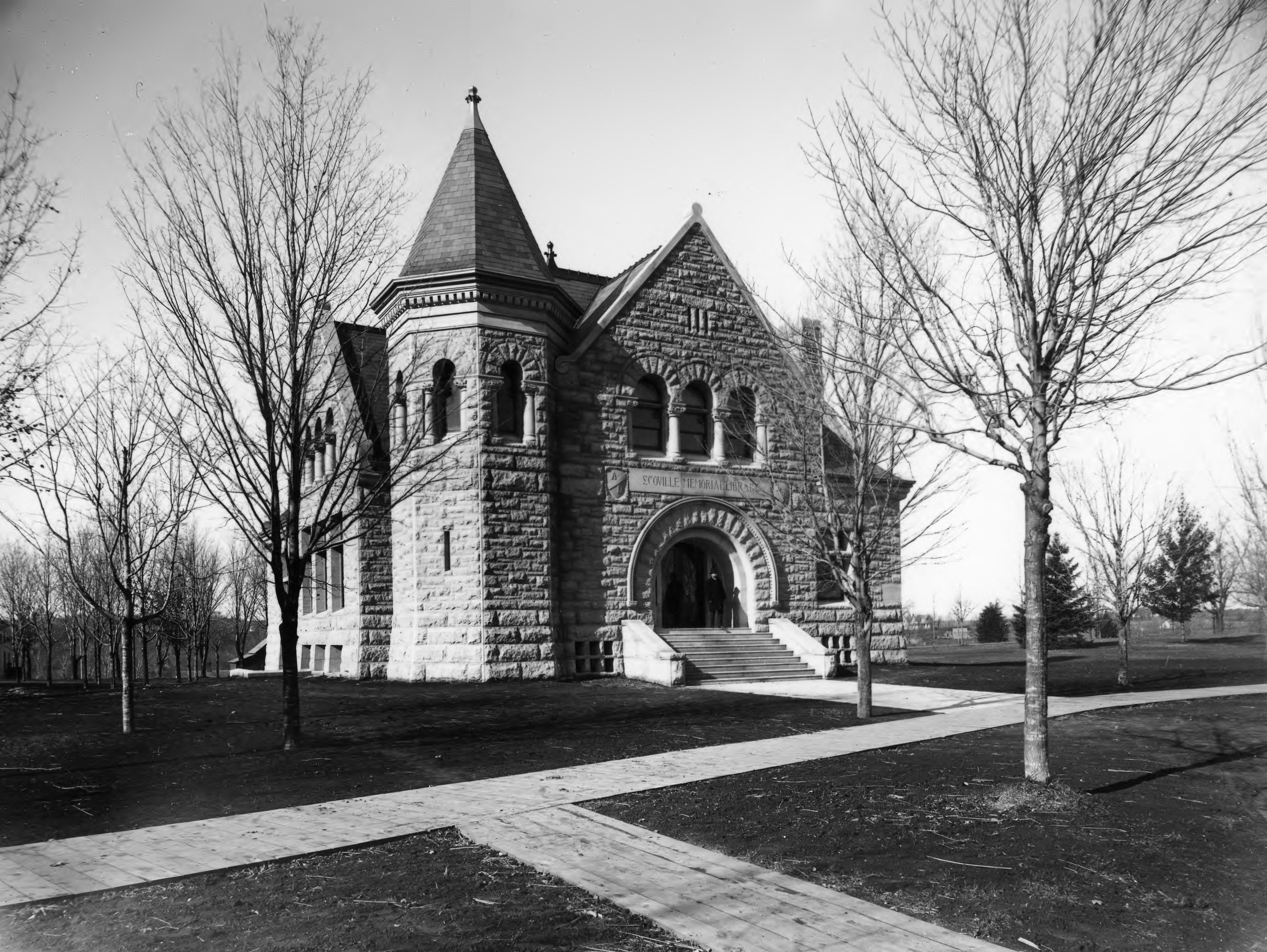
Scoville Memorial Library shortly after construction, c. 1897

It was built in 1896 and listed on the National Register of Historic Places (NRHP) in 1982.

The construction of this library "completed the historic core of buildings" on the Carleton College campus. Also NRHP-listed on the campus are Willis Hall, built 1868–72, and Goodsell Observatory, built 1887.
