= Belmonte Flats =

Apartment building in Chicago, Illinois

- U.S. National Register of Historic Places
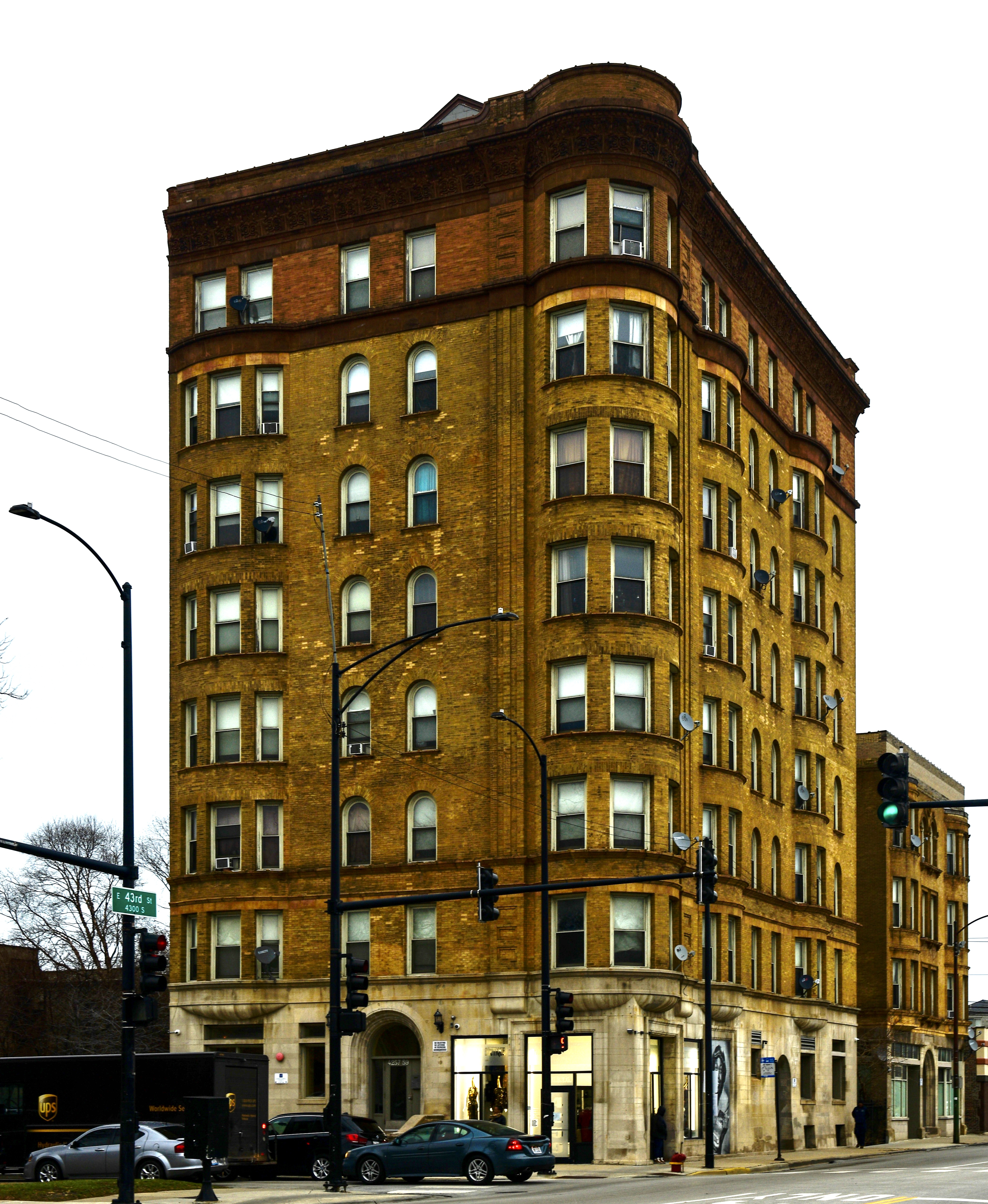

- Location within Chicago metropolitan area Location within Illinois Location within the United States
- Location: 4257-4259 S. Dr. Martin Luther King Jr. Dr., and 400-412 E. 43rd St., Chicago, Illinois
- Coordinates: 41°49′01″N 87°36′59″W
- Area: less than one acre
- Built: 1893
- Architect: Patton and Fisher
- Architectural style: Chicago School, Queen Anne, Richardsonian Romanesque
- NRHP reference No.: 98000063
- Added to NRHP: February 5, 1998

The Belmonte Flats are two connected apartment buildings at the intersection of 43rd Street and King Drive in the Grand Boulevard community area of Chicago, Illinois. The older and taller of the two buildings was built in 1893, while the other building opened in 1896. The Grand Boulevard area was popular with affluent Chicagoans at the time, and apartments like the Belmonte Flats served as luxury apartment housing for these residents. Chicago architecture firm Patton & Fisher designed the apartments; both buildings have matching Chicago school designs with Queen Anne and Richardsonian Romanesque elements. The buildings both feature brick exteriors with limestone bases and terra cotta cornices, and the taller building has a turret at its corner. The interior features extensive detailing typical of luxury housing, including ornamental moldings and brackets and a mosaic tile floor in the lobby.

The buildings were added to the National Register of Historic Places on February 5, 1998.
