= Carleton College Cowling Arboretum =

Arboretum in Minnesota, United States

Coordinates: 44.469°N 93.151°W

Cowling Arboretum
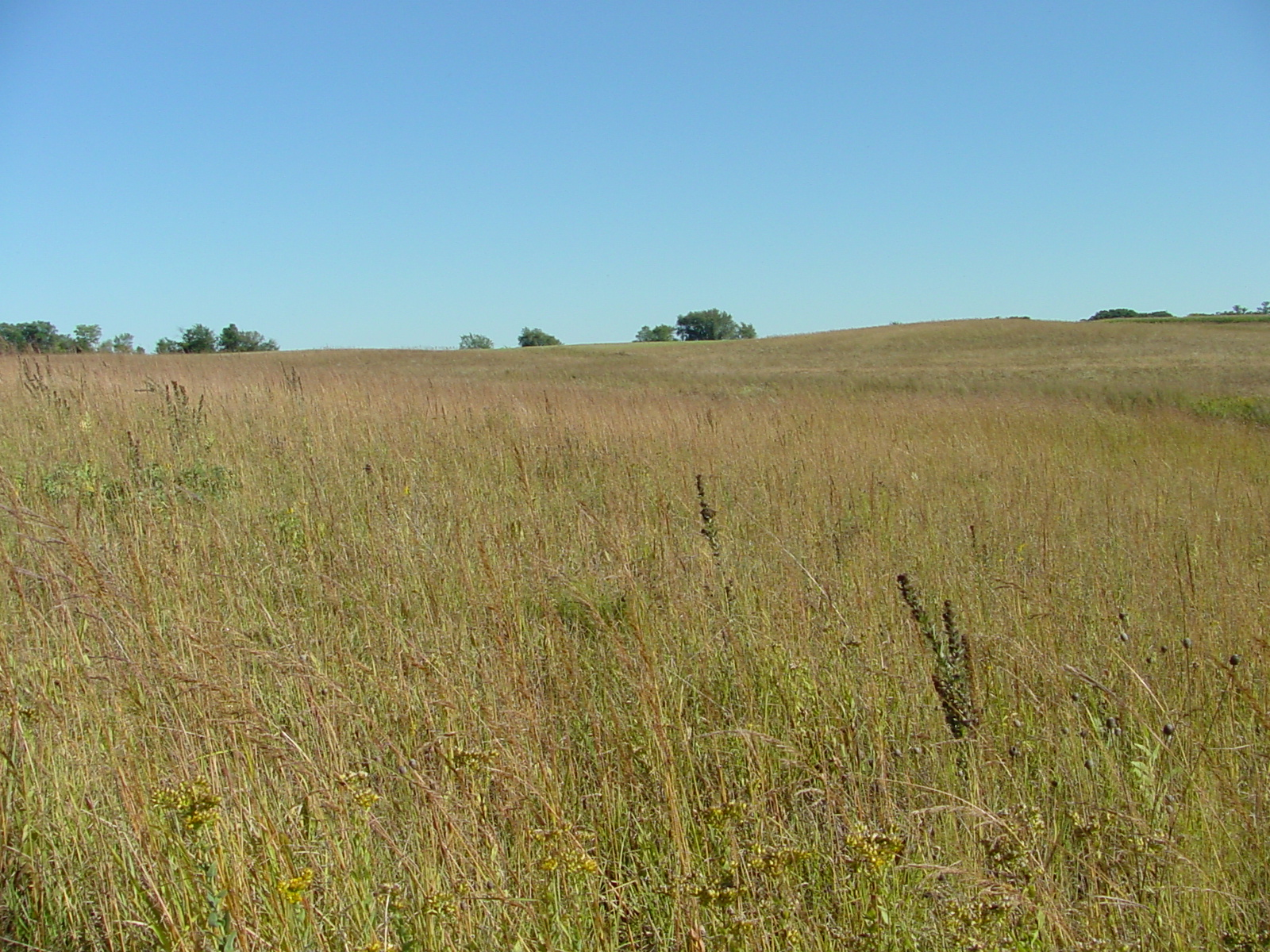
- Part of the prairie section.
- Interactive map of Cowling Arboretum
- Website: Official website

Cowling Arboretum (or The Arb) is an arboretum of 800 acres (320 ha) adjacent to Carleton College in Northfield, Minnesota. It is located on a natural border between prairie and forest habitat, and in part on the floodplain of the Cannon River. Its 15 miles (24 km) of trails are open to the public for free year-round.

The Arboretum was established by Donald J. Cowling and Harvey E. Stork in the 1920s for education, conservation, and recreation. It is a Minnesota State Game Refuge.

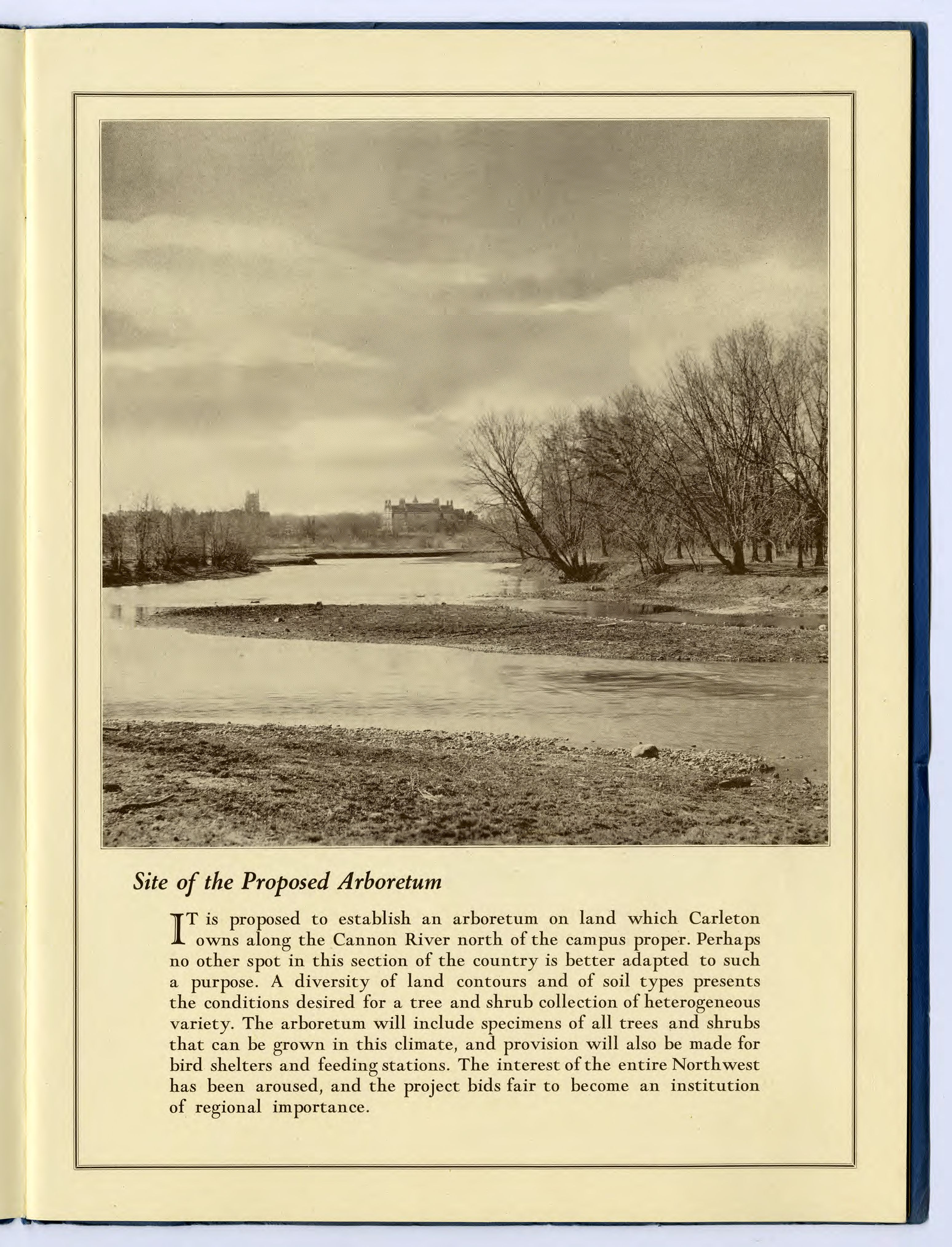
Site of the proposed arboretum in the Carleton College Viewbook, 1927

== See also ==
- List of botanical gardens in the United States
