= KRLX =

Coordinates: 44.461°N 93.156°W

- United States
- Broadcast area: Northfield, Minnesota
- Frequency: 88.1 (MHz)
- Branding: KRLX 88.1 FM

Programming
- Format: Campus radio

Ownership
- Owner: Carleton College

History
- First air date: 1948
- Call sign meaning: Ka RLten(X)

Technical information
- Licensing authority: FCC
- Class: A
- ERP: 100 watts
- HAAT: 5 meters

Links
- Public license information: Public file; LMS
- Website: krlx.org

KRLX is a student-run, freeform radio format, non-commercial FM campus radio station broadcasting from Northfield, Minnesota. The station is affiliated with Carleton College. The station's call sign was chosen to read "KaRL-ten," since X is the Roman numeral for ten. KRLX broadcasts with 100 watts of power at 88.1 MHz and produces live streaming media, expanding the station's reach to the world.

The KRLX studios are located in the basement of the Sayles-Hill Campus Center, Carleton's student union; they feature basic production tools, a record library, and a live FM studio. The record library contains around 12,000 CDs and 15,000–20,000 LPs, making it one of the largest collections at an American college radio station. The basement location is the motivation for the station's motto, "It's better on the bottom."

KRLX is licensed for continuous broadcast, but because the station is student-run, the signal is present only when school is in session. Because Carleton does not offer a summer term, the station generally broadcasts September through June, though not during winter and spring breaks. In the fall of 2005, KRLX introduced podcasting for all of its non-music shows, including all of the station's original news programming and Periscope.

Beginning in 2005, The Princeton Review began ranking KRLX as one of the nation's top college radio stations. In 2009, KRLX was ranked the 12th best station in the country. By 2018, it had moved up to position #4 on the Princeton Review list of best college radio stations.

In March 2020, Nicole Collins led the station in restarting its music arts and culture magazine, No Fidelity, which had previously ceased publication in 2016. Beginning in 2020, the publication also launched a record label, Music Imprint, releasing compilations of music made by Carleton students. New issues are released once each academic term at Carleton, and the magazine receives over $3,000 in funding annually.

== History ==
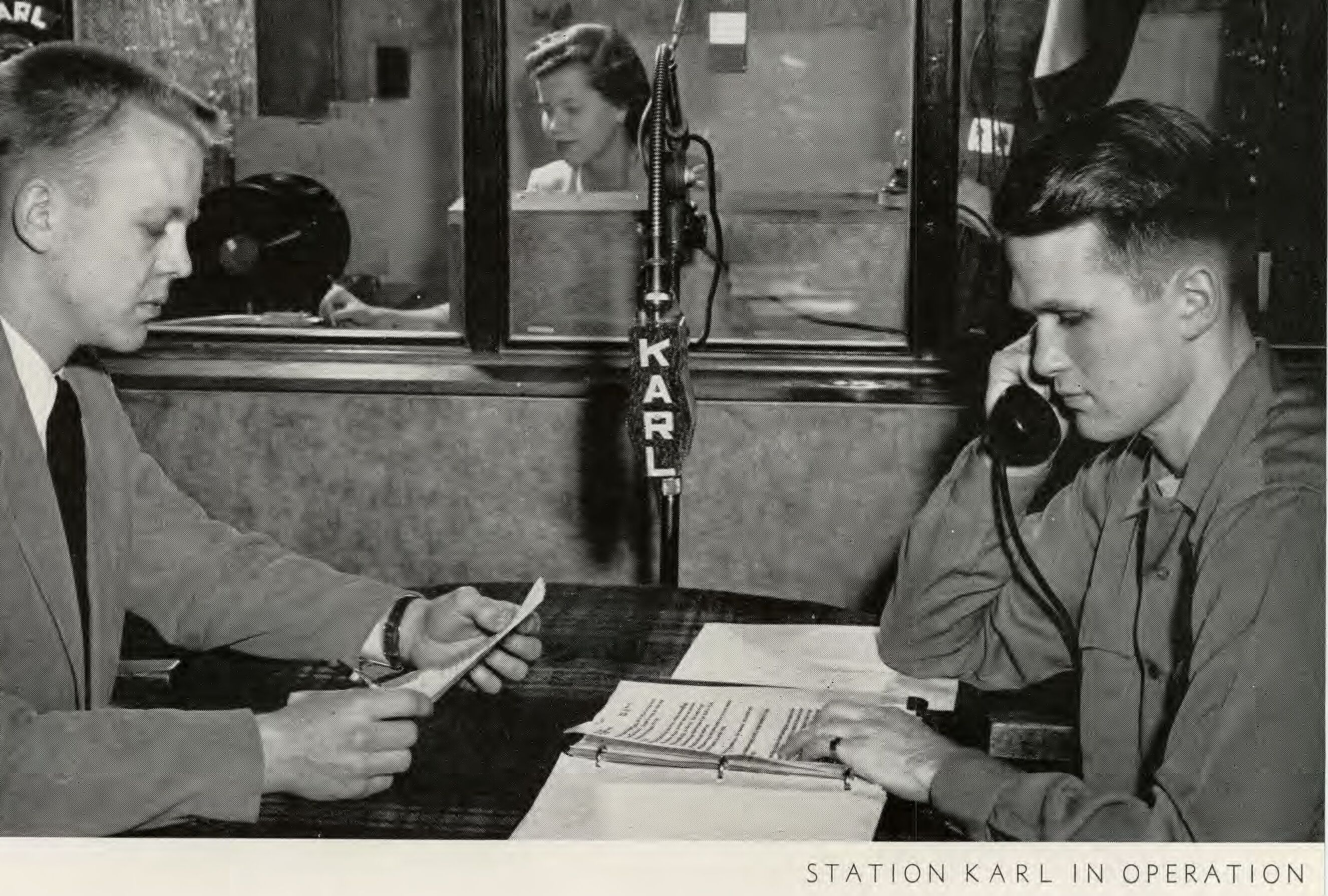
Carleton students operated their own campus broadcasting station, KARL, in 1950.

Carleton College radio started in 1917 with the Music Department's initiative to bring radio to Northfield, MN. With an antenna mounted atop Willis Hall, this AM station broadcast until 1929 at an unknown frequency. In 1948 several students on the G.I. Bill, most veterans from the United States Navy, sought to construct and operate a radio station for students on the Carleton College campus. Using money raised from local businesses and out-of-pocket, they paid the college to allow them to construct a small studio dug out next to the foundation of Scoville Memorial Library on the South side. All electronics were handmade out of spare parts and the transmitter was from a scrapped World War II destroyer. The carrier current transmission was carried via coaxial cable through the Carleton College tunnel complex and radio station KARL 680 was born. The studios were relocated to the top floor of Willis (then the student union) sometime before 1970.

During the early 70s, station manager James Stiles led the effort to take the station to the broadcast airwaves. Washington DC Carl alums assisted with the FCC licensing process, and by 1975 a boxy FM transmitter had arrived on campus. After a winter of engineering challenges, chief engineer Ben Stiegler (with a lot of help from consultant John Rooks and the MPR engineering team) achieved the first broadcast and the greater Northfield area tuned in. For a brief time, KRLX retained the carrier current operation as a training ground for new DJs; eventually it was decommissioned.

KRLX is one of the most popular student organizations at Carleton, with over 200 students DJs each trimester—roughly one out of every eight students.

== Programming ==
KRLX's format-free nature makes for very diverse programming, and recently the station has started to program vertically so that similar shows are scheduled consecutively. Radio programs on KRLX run the gamut from bluegrass to independent hip hop to classical, and DJs are restricted only by Federal Communications Commission (FCC) guidelines. Despite the station's flexibility, there are several long-running programs that are consistent in format, if not in content. Bandemonium is a weekly show devoted to the works of a single band, tracing artists' history and influences. Periscope is the station's documentary program, and the station also programs evening news and hourly news briefs. Although almost all of KRLX's programming has its genesis at Carleton, the station also broadcasts the syndicated news program Democracy Now! KRLX's content largely consists of music broadcasting, and the station contributes to the College Media Journal Radio 200 chart.

KRLX's programming can be heard around the world via live stream from their website.

== Technical data ==
- Service Designation: Full Service FM Site
- Channel & Class: 201A, 88.1 MHz
- FCC Facility Identification: 8867
- Location:
  - 44° 27' 39.00" N latitude
  - 93° 09' 21.00" W longitude
- Effective Radiated Power (ERP): 0.1 kW (100 watt)
- Antenna Height Above Average Terrain: 5 M HAAT
- Antenna Height Above Mean Sea Level: 309 M AMSL
- Antenna Height Above Ground Level: 20 M AGL

== See also ==
- Campus radio
- List of college radio stations in the United States
