= Carleton College =

Private liberal arts college in Northfield, Minnesota, U.S.

Coordinates: 44°27′43″N 93°9′13″W

- Former name: Northfield College (1866–1871)
- Motto: Declaratio Sermonum Tuorum Illuminat (Latin)
- Motto in English: The Revelation / Announcement of Your Words Illuminates
- Type: Private liberal arts college
- Established: December 1866; 159 years ago
- Academic affiliations: ACM; Annapolis Group; CLAC; COFHE; NAICU; Oberlin Group; Space-grant
- Endowment: $1.33 billion (2025)
- President: Alison Byerly
- Faculty: 268 (2024)
- Undergraduates: 2,019 (2025)
- Location: Northfield, Minnesota, United States
- Campus: Small City, 1,040 acres (420 ha)
- Colors: Blue and Maize
- Nickname: Knights
- Sporting affiliations: NCAA Division III – MIAC
- Website: www.carleton.edu

Carleton College (/ˈkɑːrltɪn/ KARL-tin) is a private liberal arts college in Northfield, Minnesota, United States. Founded in 1866, the 200-acre (81 ha) main campus is between Northfield and the approximately 800-acre (320 ha) Cowling Arboretum, which became part of the campus in the 1920s.

The college offers courses from 33 major programs and 39 minor programs, and has the option for students to design their own majors. Carleton's varsity sports compete at the NCAA Division III level in the Minnesota Intercollegiate Athletic Conference.

== History ==
The school was founded in 1866, when the Minnesota Conference of Congregational Churches unanimously accepted a resolution to locate a college in Northfield. Two Northfield businessmen, Charles Augustus Wheaton and Charles Moorehouse Goodsell, each donated 10 acres (4 ha) of land for the first campus. The first students enrolled at the preparatory unit of Northfield College in the fall of 1867. In 1870, the first college president, James Strong, traveled to the East Coast to raise funds for the college. On his way from visiting a potential donor, William Carleton of Charlestown, Massachusetts, Strong was badly injured in a collision between his carriage and a train. Impressed by Strong's survival of the accident, Carleton donated $50,000 to the fledgling institution in 1871. As a result, the Board of Trustees renamed the school to Carleton College in his honor.

The first graduating class was in 1874 and consisted of James J. Dow and Myra A. Brown, who married each other later that year. A third student, Bayard T. Holmes, had originally been in the same class, but withdrew before graduating.

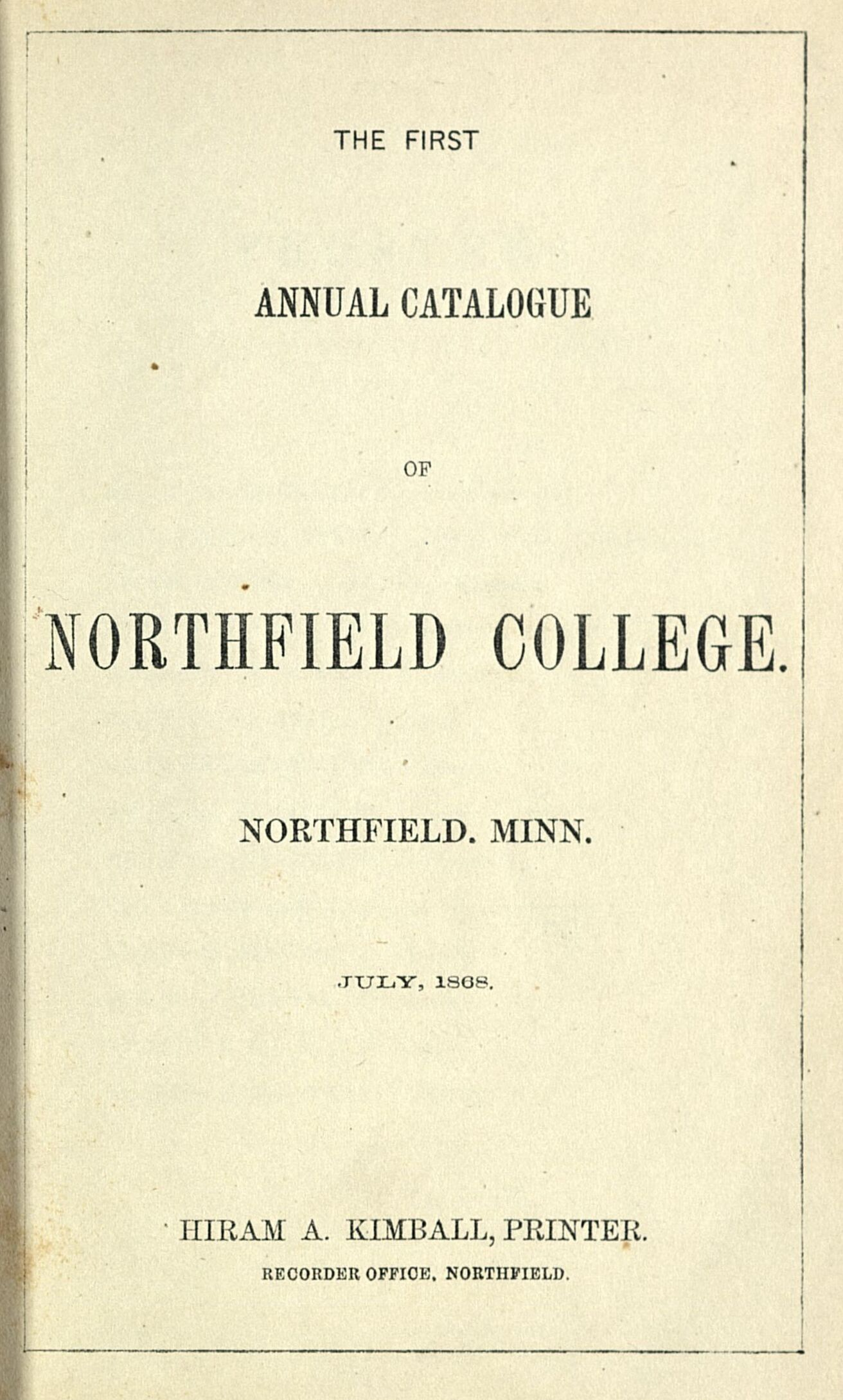
Title page to the first academic catalog for Northfield College

On September 7, 1876, the James-Younger Gang, led by outlaw Jesse James, tried to rob the First National Bank of Northfield. Joseph Lee Heywood, Carleton's Treasurer, was acting cashier at the bank that day. He was shot and killed for refusing to open the safe, foiling the attempt. Carleton later named a library fund after Heywood. The Heywood Society is the name for a group of donors who have named Carleton in their wills.

In its early years under the presidency of James Strong, Carleton reflected the theological conservatism of its Minnesota Congregational founders. In 1903, modern religious influences were introduced by William Sallmon, a Yale Divinity School graduate, who was hired as college president. Sallmon was opposed by conservative faculty members and alumni, and left the presidency by 1908. After Sallmon left, the trustees hired Donald J. Cowling, another theologically liberal Yale Divinity School graduate, as his successor. In 1916, under Cowling's leadership, Carleton began an official affiliation with the Minnesota Baptist Convention. It lasted until 1928, when the Baptists severed the relationship as a result of fundamentalist opposition to Carleton's liberalism, including the college's support for teaching evolution. Non-denominational for a number of years, in 1964 Carleton abolished its requirement for weekly attendance at some religious or spiritual meeting.

In 1927, students founded the first student-run pub in the nation, The Cave. Located in the basement of Evans Hall, it continues to host live music shows and other events several times each week.

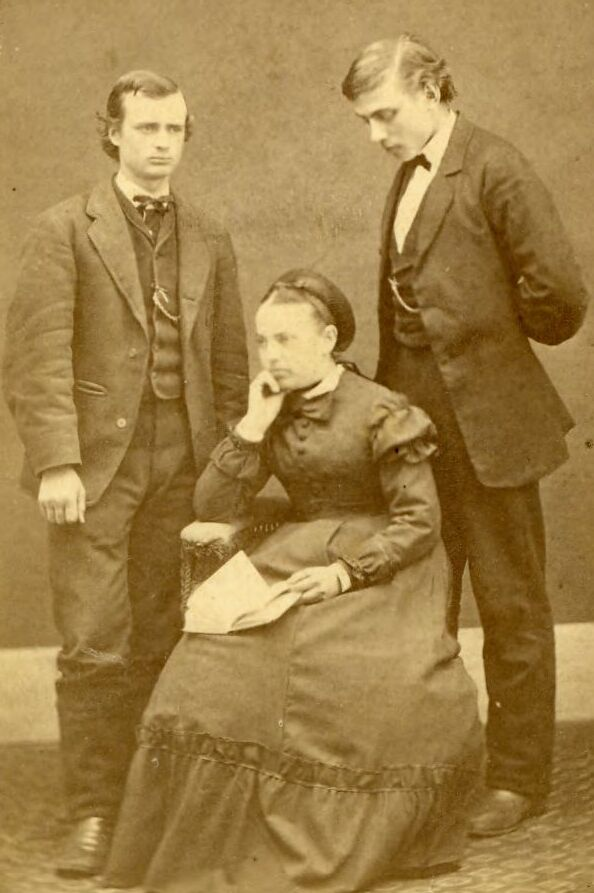
James J. Dow, Myra A. Brown, and Bayard T. Holmes

In 1942, Carleton purchased land in Stanton, about 10 miles (16 km) east of campus, to use for flight training. During World War II, several classes of male students went through air basic training at the college. Since being sold by the college in 1944, the Stanton Airfield has been operated for commercial use. Also during this time, Japanese American students in concentration camps were invited to study at Carleton.

The world premiere production of the English translation of Bertolt Brecht's play, The Caucasian Chalk Circle, was performed in 1948 at Carleton's Little Nourse Theater.

In 1963, Carleton students founded the Reformed Druids of North America, initially as a means to be excused from attendance of then-mandatory weekly chapel service. Within a few years, the group evolved to engage in legitimate spiritual exploration. Its legacy remains in campus location names such as the Stone Circle (commonly called "the Druid Circle") and the Hill of the Three Oaks. Meetings continue to be held in the Carleton College Cowling Arboretum.

President Bill Clinton gave the last commencement address of his administration at Carleton, on June 10, 2000, marking the first presidential visit to the college.

== Campus ==
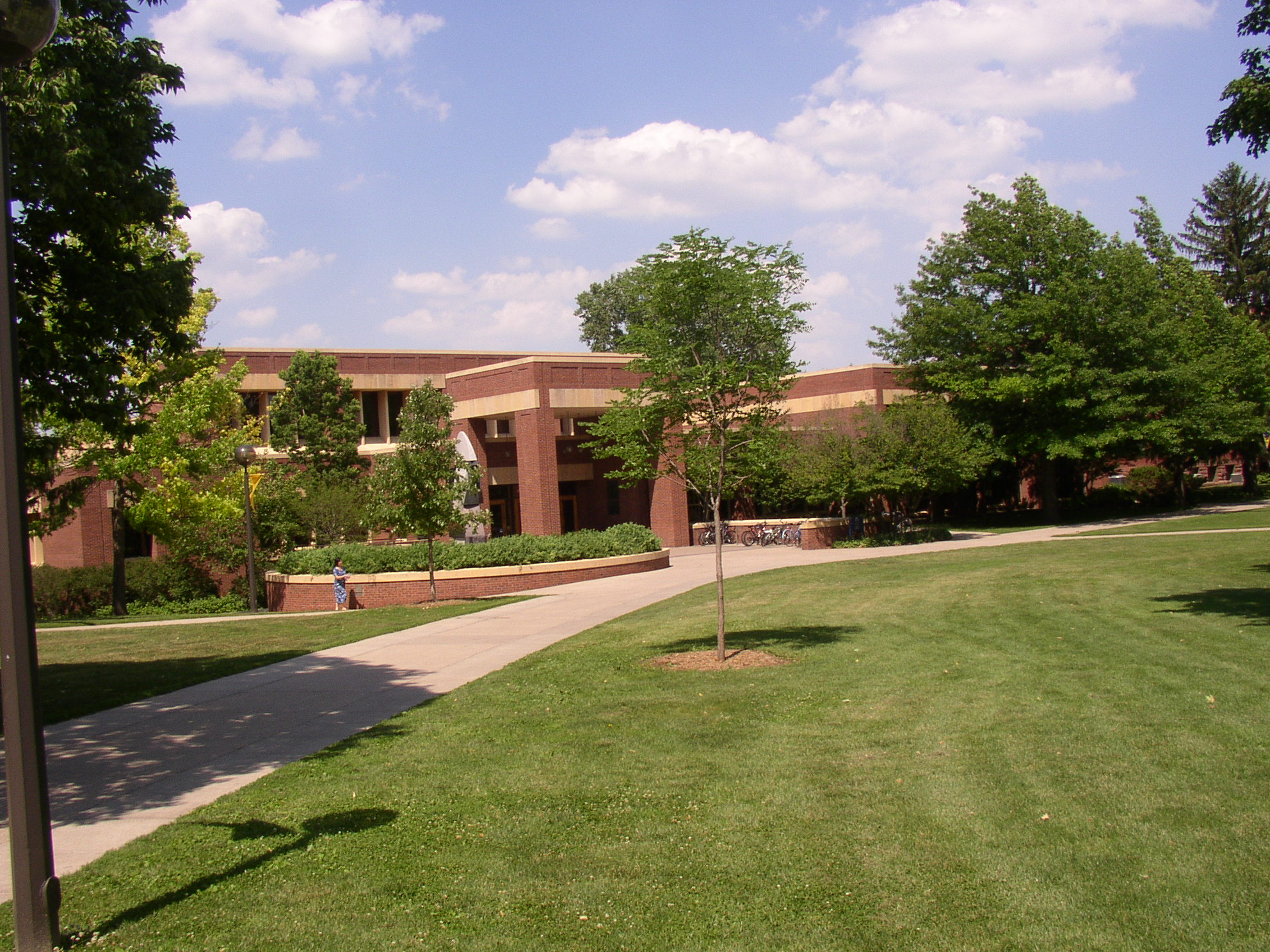
The Laurence McKinley Gould Library operates all days of the week, and was built in 1956 and enlarged in 1983.

The college campus was created in 1867 with the gifts of two 10-acre (4 ha) parcels from local businessmen Charles M. Goodsell and Charles Augustus Wheaton. The 1,040-acre (420 ha) school campus is on a hill overlooking the Cannon River, at the northeast edge of Northfield. To the north and east is the 800-acre (320 ha) Cowling Arboretum, which was farm fields in the early years of the college.

The 0.25-acre (0.10 ha) Jo Ryo En Japanese Garden is located behind Watson Hall in the center of the campus.

=== Campus buildings ===
Several of Carleton's older buildings have been listed on the National Register of Historic Places (NRHP). Willis Hall, the first building on campus, was constructed from 1869 to 1872. Originally the hall contained the men's dormitory, classrooms, library, and chapel. The building was gutted by fire in 1879, after which it was entirely rebuilt within the existing stone shell. The original front of the building became the rear entrance with the construction of Severance Hall in 1928. As new buildings were constructed, various academic departments cycled through the building. Beginning in 1954, Willis served as the college student union, until it was replaced in 1979 by the Sayles-Hill Student Center, a converted gymnasium. Willis Hall now houses the Economics, Political Science, and Educational Studies offices.

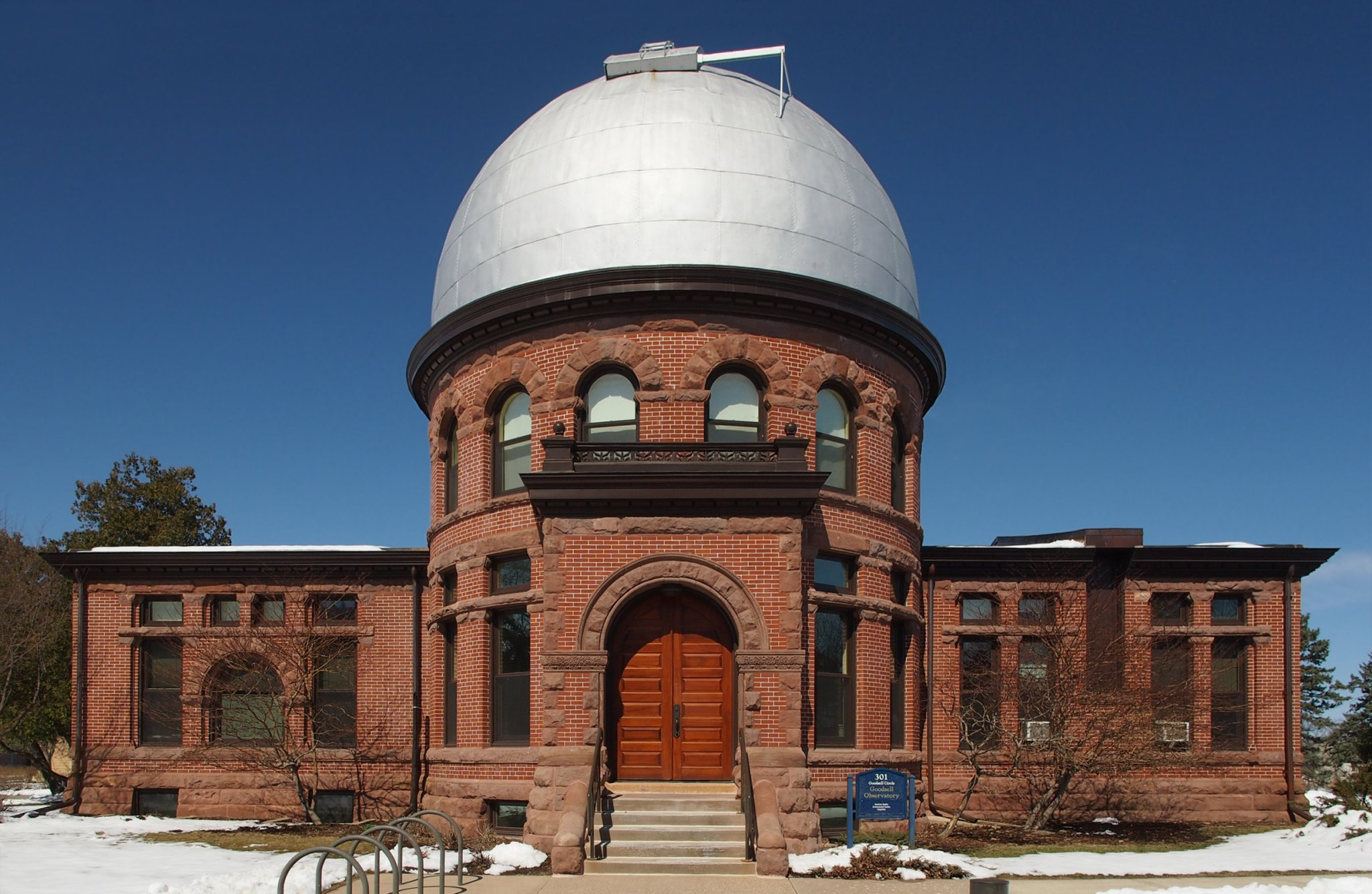
Goodsell Observatory at Carleton College is on the National Register of Historic Places and is currently the largest observatory in Minnesota.

Goodsell Observatory, also on the NRHP, was constructed in 1887 and at the time was the largest observatory in the state of Minnesota. It was named for Charles Goodsell, who donated land for the campus. From the late 19th century to the end of World War II, Goodsell Observatory kept the time for every major railroad west of the Mississippi River, including Northern Pacific Railway, the Great Northern Railway, the Chicago, Milwaukee, and St. Paul Railroad, and the St. Paul, Minneapolis and Manitoba Railway.

Scoville Hall (originally Scoville Memorial Library), completed in 1896, is on the NRHP. Replaced in function by the Gould Library in the 1950s, Scoville was adapted for administrative space.

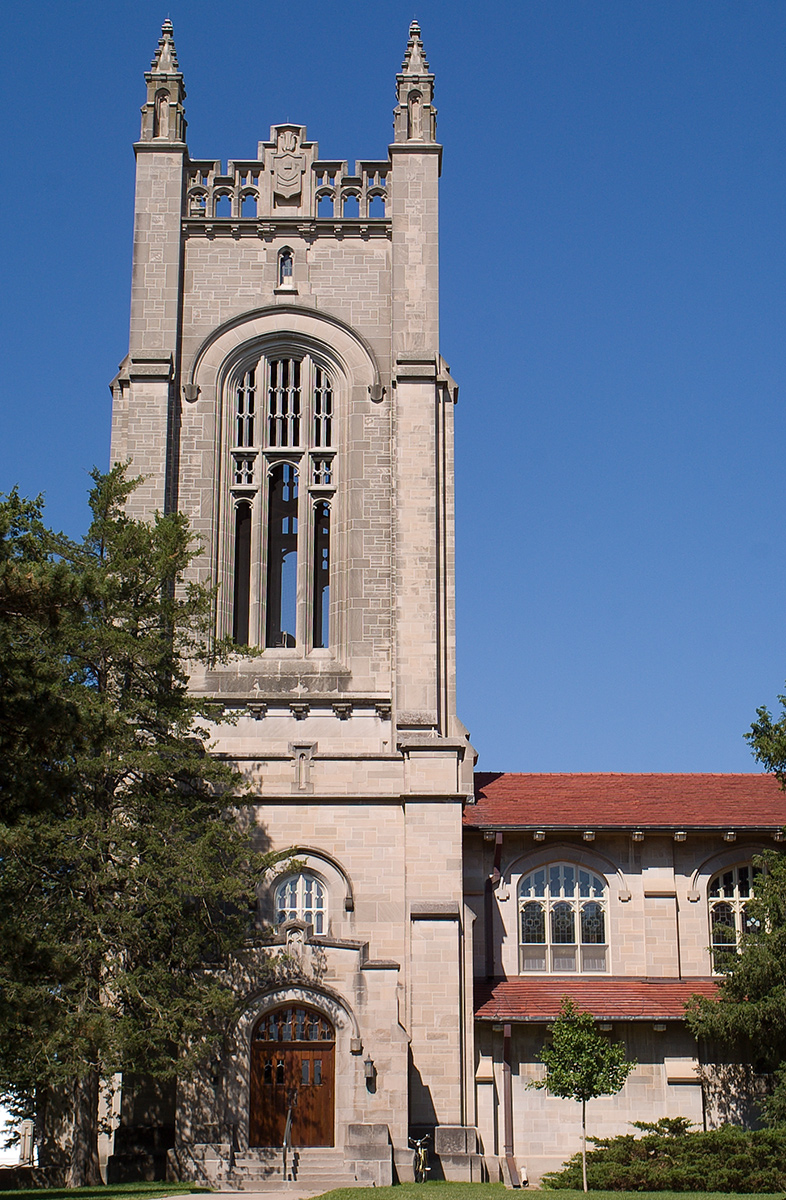
Skinner Memorial Chapel hosts spiritual life events as well as the weekly convocation.

Four nineteenth-century buildings have been demolished. Gridley Hall (1882) was the main women's dormitory for many years, and was torn down in 1967 for construction of the Music and Drama Center. Williams Hall (1880) was the college's first science building, and was demolished in 1961. Seccombe House (1880) was used for music instruction until 1914, and was located near the site of the current Skinner Chapel. The first observatory (1878) was replaced by Goodsell Observatory in 1887, and the old building was demolished in 1905 to make way for Laird Hall.

Laird Hall was built for science classes in 1905; the classical-revival building now houses the English department and administrative offices, including the president's office. Sayles-Hill was built as the first school gymnasium in 1910, and converted to a student center in 1979.

The eclectic styles of the eight buildings that made up the college in 1914, when Donald Cowling became president, were replaced by a uniform Collegiate Gothic style for the nine buildings erected during his tenure. Skinner Memorial Chapel, completed in 1916, is on the NRHP. Three connected western dorms were built for men: Burton Hall (1915), Davis Hall (1923), and Severance Hall (1928), and two residence halls were built for women: Nourse Hall (1917) and Margaret Evans Hall (1927). Evans Hall was notable for decades for its subdivision into adjacent columns of rooms off stairwells, rather than the more typical arrangement of floors of rooms on hallways. In the fall of 2012, Evans was heavily refurbished to modernize the internal layout and increase overall occupancy. Music Hall was built in 1914, and has housed the Political Science and International Relations department as Hasenstab Hall since 2022. Laird Stadium which stands at the site of the football and track field, was built in 1927. Leighton Hall (1920), originally built for the Chemistry department, now houses academic and administrative offices, including the business office.

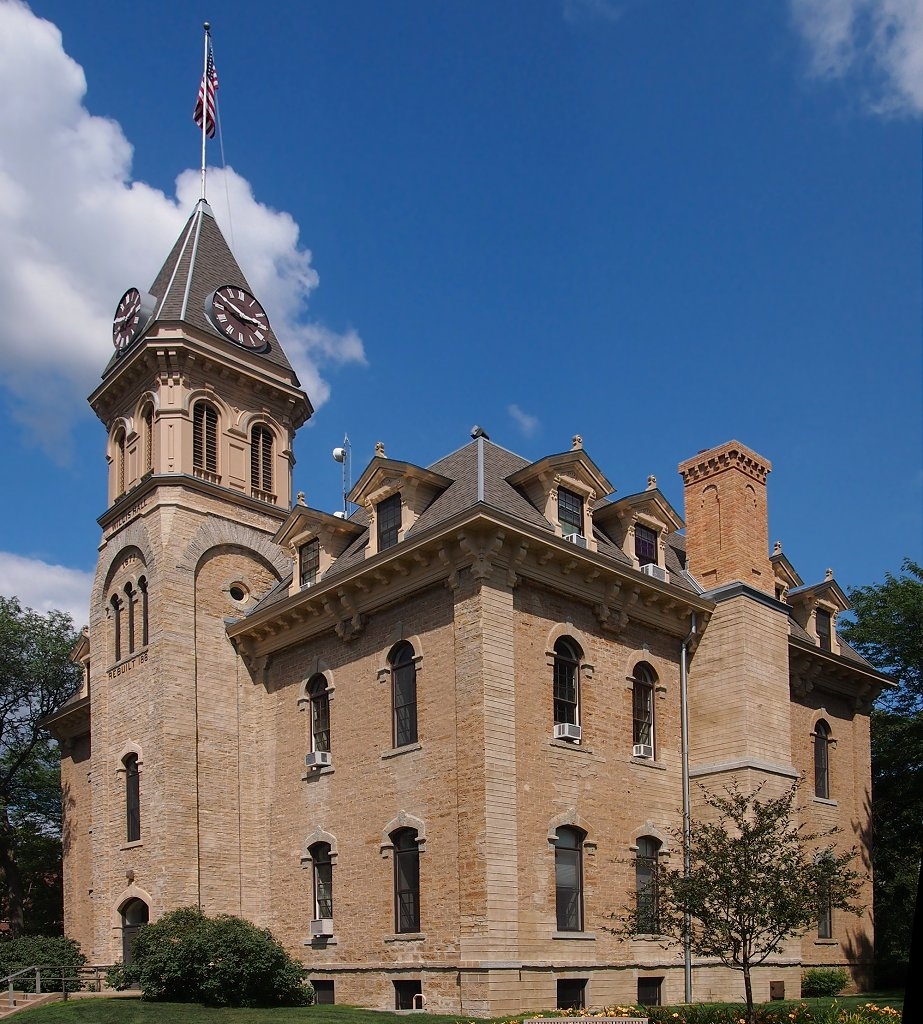
Willis Hall is one of the oldest remaining campus buildings, constructed in 1872 and refurbished after a fire in 1880.

The Great Depression and World War II essentially ended the construction boom for two decades. Boliou Hall was built in 1949 in a modernist style, using yellow sandstone as a major element. It was enlarged using a similar style and materials in the early 1990s. The Library was built in 1956 in a similar style, but was expanded in a brick-based style in the mid-1980s. It was renamed the Gould Memorial Library in 1995 for former President Larry Gould. Musser and Myers Halls were built in 1958 as men's and women's dorms respectively, in a bare-bones modernist brick style.

Minoru Yamasaki, architect of the Northwestern National Life Building in Minneapolis and of the original New York World Trade Center, designed five buildings at Carleton in the 1960s. Olin Hall of Science (1961) has a distinctive "radiator" grill work on the exterior. Goodhue (1962) and Watson (1966) Halls were built as dormitories. At seven floors, Watson is the tallest building on campus. The West Gym (1964) and Cowling Gym (1965) were built to replace Sayles-Hill for indoor athletic facilities, originally for men and women respectively.

Carleton's largest athletic facility is the Recreation Center, built in 2000. The 1969 Music and Drama Center's functions were largely taken over by the Weitz Center of Creativity upon its completion in 2012, and it was demolished in 2022. The college's science facilities, anchored in Yamasaki's Olin Hall, were significantly expanded by the construction of Hulings Hall (1995) and Evelyn M. Anderson Hall (2020).

The 2020s also saw the construction of several new townhouse-style accommodations at Lilac Hill, near the Recreation Center, and Union Street, near downtown Northfield.

=== Cowling Arboretum ===
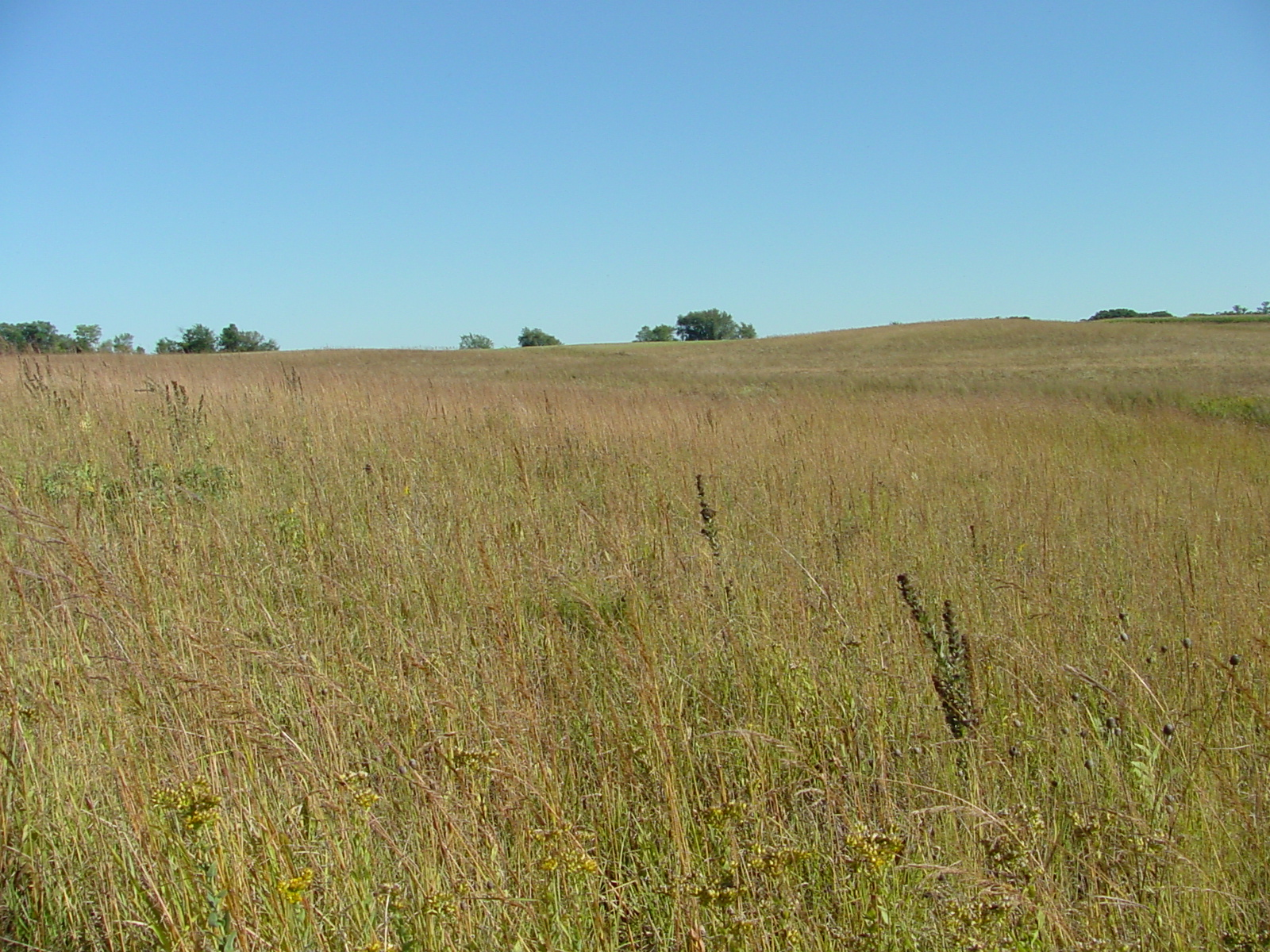
Carleton prairie in the Arboretum

Since 1970, acreage has been removed from cultivation in sections. The Arboretum has approximately 800 acres (320 ha) of restored and remnant forest, Cannon River floodplain, bur oak (Quercus macrocarpa) savannah, and tallgrass prairie. The Arboretum is divided by Minnesota Highway 19 into the larger Lower Arb to the north (so-called because it includes the Cannon River valley) and the smaller Upper Arb. Pedestrian trails are located throughout the Arboretum, as well as the school's cross-country running and skiing courses, and a paved mixed-use bicycle/running trail in the Upper Arb.

=== Sustainability ===
The College Sustainability Report Card, which evaluated 200 colleges and universities with the largest endowments in the United States and Canada, Carleton received a grade of A−, earning the award of "Overall College Sustainability Leader". A wind turbine located near the campus generates the equivalent of up to 40 percent of Carleton's electrical energy use; it is configured to sell this power back to the local grid for the most efficient use system wide. In late 2011, Carleton installed a second wind turbine that provides power directly to the campus, providing more than 25 percent of the college's electrical energy use.

Three different geothermal bore fields are on campus, underneath two of the main green spaces and Bell Field.

== Academics ==
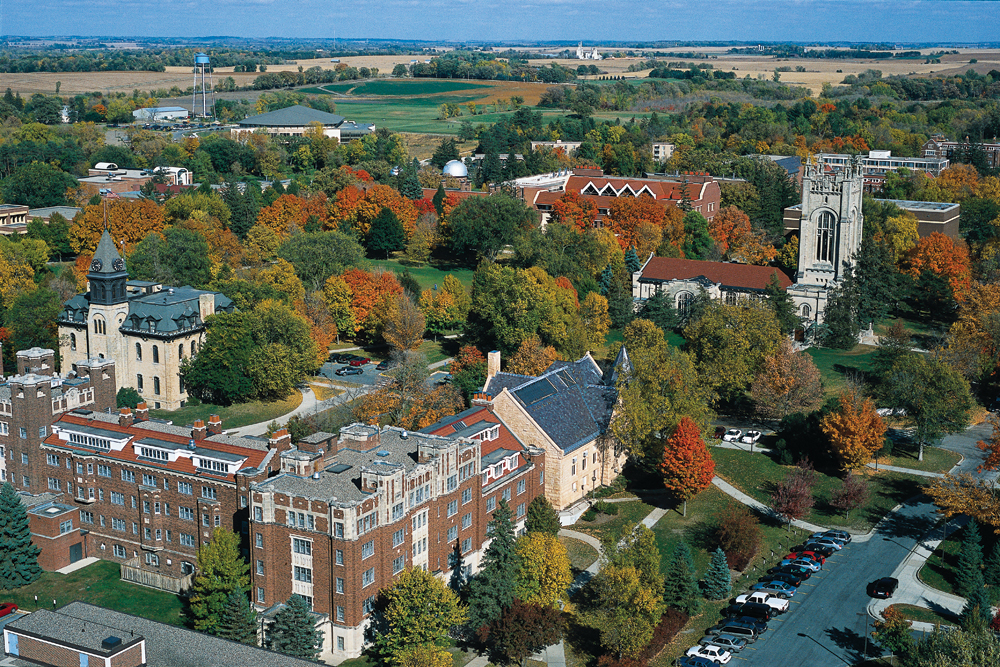
Aerial view of the campus

Carleton is a small, liberal arts college offering 33 different majors and 39 minors, and is accredited by the Higher Learning Commission. Students also have the option to design their own major, although gaining approval for a special major petition is infrequent, and requires approval by the Academic Standing Committee (ASC). Ten languages are offered: Spanish, French, German, Chinese, Japanese, Russian, Arabic, Latin, Greek, and Hebrew. The academic calendar follows a trimester system in which students usually take three classes per 10-week term. As of January 2026, Computer Science is the most popular major, with 147 declared majors in the combined classes of 2026 and 2027. Biology is the second most common major with 123 students, followed by Psychology with 97 students.

Carleton's graduation requirements are designed to expose students to a wide variety of disciplines independent of their selected major subject. Degree students are required to demonstrate proficiency in a second language (which can be achieved through testing, placement examinations, or classes at Carleton). All first-year non-transfer students are assigned to an Argument and Inquiry (A&I) seminar in their first term. During their studies, students are required to take a writing-rich course, three quantitative reasoning encounters (courses in which students work with quantitative data and arguments), four terms of physical education activity, as well as courses in international studies, intercultural domestic studies, humanistic inquiry, literary/artistic analysis, arts practice, science with lab, formal or statistical reasoning, and social inquiry.

Studying abroad is common at Carleton: 76% of the senior class of 2018 studied abroad at least once over their four years. Carleton offers a number of its own programs each year, which are led by Carleton faculty and available only to Carleton students. In 2017–2018, 17 such programs were offered. Although many students opt to go on a Carleton-specific program, because full financial aid and academic credits can transfer to other programs, many students choose to study with other schools or organizations.

=== Admissions ===
Admission to Carleton has been categorized as "most selective" by U.S. News & World Report. The class of 2029 admittance rate was 20%, making Carleton the most selective college in Minnesota.

Carleton has a history of enrolling students who are in the National Merit Scholarship Program, often enrolling more than any other liberal arts college in the nation. The class of 2026 included 38 National Merit Scholars.

=== Rankings ===
Academic rankings

Liberal arts
- U.S. News & World Report: 16
- Washington Monthly: 19

National
- Forbes: 172
- WSJ/College Pulse: 35

Carleton was in the top 10 liberal arts colleges in the U.S. News & World Report rankings from 1997 to 2025–2026. In 2025 it was tied for 8th overall, 1st for "Best Undergraduate Teaching", and 17th for "Best Value". Carleton's U.S. News ranking dropped to 16 in the 2026–2027 rankings. In 2019, the Washington Monthly ratings — using criteria of social mobility, research, and service — ranked Carleton the 24th best college in the liberal arts college category. In the 2019 Forbes ranking of 650 American colleges, which combines liberal arts colleges, service academies and national research universities, Carleton is ranked 52nd.

Kiplinger's Personal Finance places Carleton 13th in its 2019 ranking of the 149 best value liberal arts colleges in the United States. Carleton was ranked 5th in the 2015 Brookings Institution list of "Four-Year or Higher Colleges With the Highest Value-Added With Respect to Mid-Career Earnings", with Carleton adding an estimated 43% in value, raising the predicted mid-career salary of $76,236 to $117,700. In a 2012 study of higher education institutions, Carleton was listed as the most chosen as a peer institution, followed by Princeton and Oberlin.

=== Graduates ===
In the 2023–2024 school year, 14 Carleton graduates obtained a Fulbright grant from 54 applications. Among liberal arts colleges, the school is a "Top Producer of Fulbright Awards for American Students". Carleton has produced 75 Watson Fellows.

Of those who applied, on average over 80% of Carleton graduates are accepted to medical school and about 90% to law school. Within five years of graduating, between 65% and 75% of graduates pursue postgraduate studies. The 15 most common graduate or professional schools attended by Carleton students are University of Minnesota–Twin Cities, University of Wisconsin–Madison, University of Michigan–Ann Arbor, Harvard, University of Chicago, University of Washington, Columbia, UC Berkeley, Northwestern, NYU, Yale, and Stanford. The most commonly pursued graduate programs are law, medicine, education, business administration, history, and chemistry. Carleton is the second-largest producer of Harvard Divinity School students, after Harvard College.

Over 20% of all Carleton graduates since 1990 work in the business/finance/sales sector. Over 10% work in either healthcare or higher education. Pre K-12 education accounts for about 9% of graduates. Carleton graduates with only a bachelor's degree have an average mid-career salary of $113,800, according to self-reported data from PayScale.

== Student life ==
=== Student body ===
Carleton typically enrolls about 2,000 students, with roughly equal numbers of women and men.

As of 2016, 26.5% of the total student population are domestic students of color, 10.9% are among the first generation in their family to attend college, and 83.5% are U.S. citizens from out of state.

10.2% of students are international, with the most represented countries being China (4.3%), South Korea (0.8%), India (0.7%), Canada (0.7%), and Japan (0.4%).

=== Extracurricular organizations ===
The school's nearly 240 active student organizations include three theater boards (coordinating as many as ten productions every term), long-form and short-form improv groups and a sketch comedy troupe, six a cappella groups, four choirs, seven specialized instrumental ensembles, five dance interest groups, two auditioned dance companies, a successful Mock Trial team, a nationally competitive debate program, and the student-run 24-hour KRLX radio station, which employs more than 200 volunteers each term.

In the 2013–2014 academic year, the school's Model United Nations team ranked among the top 25 in the nation. Carleton's Model United Nations team has also been awarded the Best Delegation in previous editions of the World Model United Nations competition.

=== Student publications ===
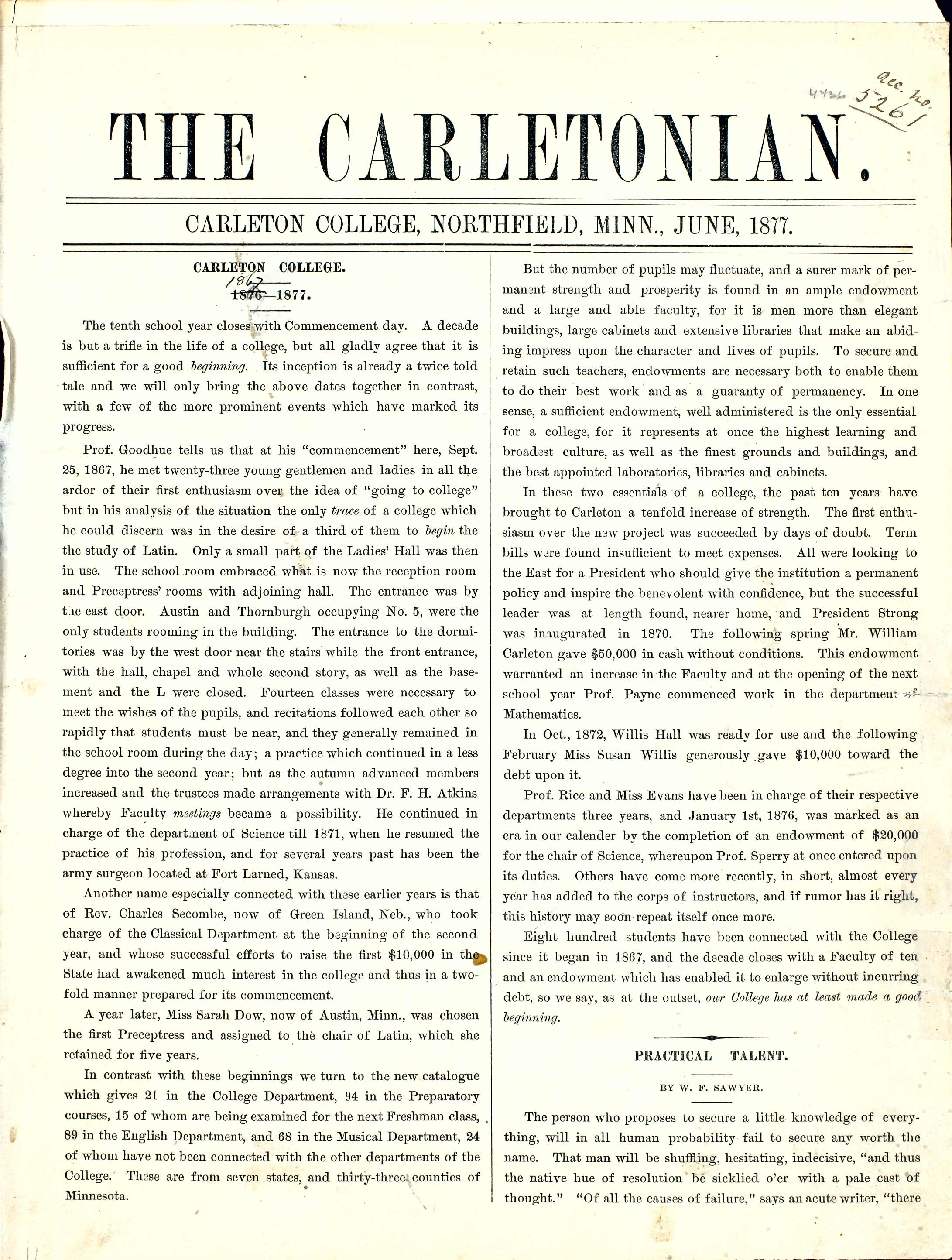
Inaugural issue of The Carletonian, published June 1877

The Carletonian is the school's student newspaper. It was founded in 1877 and renamed The Carletonia from June 1881 until November 12, 1921, when it regained its original title. The paper was originally published annually, then monthly or semi-monthly until fall 1910, when it began regular weekly publication. From January to September 1977, the paper was published daily under the title The Carleton Daily, after which time it reverted to weekly publication as The Carletonian. Currently, it is distributed weekly on Fridays during the school year.

The Cow Print is a satire magazine at Carleton, published and distributed fortnightly. It was founded in 1999 as The Carl, an arts and culture supplement to The Carletonian, and renamed The Cow Print in May 2021.

The Carleton Literary Association Paper (The CLAP) is a weekly satire publication, distributed on Fridays during convocation time. The magazine is printed in grayscale, on 8.5" x 11" paper instead of traditional newsprint. The CLAP is notable for accepting any and all student submissions, allowing any student to have their opinions and jokes published without censorship.

=== Traditions ===
Carleton has numerous student traditions and a long history of student pranks, including painting the college's water tower. Notably, a likeness of President Clinton was painted on the tower the night before his commencement speech in 2000. Early the following morning, college maintenance staff painted over it (although in his speech, Clinton mentioned his amusement and regret it had been covered before he could see it).

==== Schiller bust ====
A bust of Friedrich Schiller, known simply as "Schiller", has made regular, brief appearances at large campus events. The tradition dates back to 1956, when two students absconded with the bust from Scoville Library while books were being transferred to the new library. "Schiller" resided in their dorm rooms for a period, only to have the bust taken from them. Possession of the bust escalated into an elaborate competition, which took on a high degree of secrecy and strategy.

Schiller's public appearances, accompanied with a cry of "Schiller!", are a tacit challenge to other students to capture the bust. The currently circulating bust of Schiller was retrieved from Puebla, Mexico in the summer of 2003. In 2006, students created an online scavenger hunt, made up of a series of complex riddles about Carleton, which led participants to Schiller's hidden location. The bust was stolen from the winner of the scavenger hunt. At commencement in 2006, the holders of the bust arranged for Schiller to "graduate". When his name was called at the appropriate moment, the bust was pulled from behind the podium and displayed.

In March 2010, the bust of Schiller appeared on The Colbert Report. The appearance was organized by custodians of Schiller who contacted Peter Gwinn, a Carleton alumnus who was a writer for the program. The bust also appeared on a Halloween broadcast of A Prairie Home Companion on Minnesota Public Radio.

==== Rotblatt ====
In 1964, Carleton students named an intramural slow-pitch softball league after Marv Rotblatt, a former Chicago White Sox pitcher. Although traditional intramural softball is still played at Carleton, the name "Rotblatt" now refers to a campus-wide annual beer softball game that is played with one inning for every year of the school's existence. The game begins at sunrise and lasts until the slated number of innings have been completed for that year. The only rule for gameplay is that all players must have a cup in one hand. In 1997, Sports Illustrated honored Rotblatt in its "Best of Everything" section with the award, "Longest Intramural Event". Rotblatt himself attended the game several times over the course of his life and appreciated the tradition.

==== Friday Flowers ====
A highly visible campus tradition is "Friday Flowers", where students can purchase individual flowers from a local florist and place them in one another's mailboxes each Friday of term. This tradition was in the news after three students died in a car accident en route to a frisbee tournament in 2014. Students at the nearby St. Olaf College sent over Friday Flowers for each student's mailbox. Later that fall, after a St. Olaf student died, Carleton returned the gesture.

==== Freshman Frisbee Toss ====
Every first year student receives a frisbee on their first day of orientation. The design of the disc changes from year to year but always includes a penguin and the graduating year. At the Frisbee Toss Ceremony, students write their name on the frisbee, gather on the Bald Spot in a circle and throw their discs. This officially marks the beginning of a student's time at Carleton. After the toss, each new student collects a disc and eventually returns it to the original owner in the hopes of making a new friend.

==== Beer Olympics ====
Each spring term since at least 2002 a number of Carleton students have participated in Beer Olympics (BO). In recent years, over 100 students have competed. BO is a competition that spans two days and consists of a series of events involving chugging beer (usually Hamm's). These events include the frisbee, in which two students chug four beers out of a frisbee placed on the floor; the high-jump, in which a single student chugs up to eight beers out of a one-story-tall beer bong; and the 40-40, in which a student chugs a 40-ounce beer and runs a 40-yard dash.

Every year, a commission of students is elected to plan and organize Beer Olympics. The commission rotates every year, and any changes to the rules must be ratified and explained in the Beer Olympics Manifesto, which as of 2019 was 11 pages long.

==== Farmstock ====
Every spring since 1979, Carleton students have organized a music festival called Farmstock. Originally a small event with a picnic and acoustic music, the event has evolved into an all-campus affair, featuring the roasting of a whole pig and a full day of live music. The event takes place in the backyard of Farm House—Carleton's sustainability interest house—and is planned and organized by Farm students.

== Athletics ==
The Carleton athletic teams are called the Knights. The college is a member of the NCAA Division III ranks, primarily competing in the Minnesota Intercollegiate Athletic Conference (MIAC) since the 1983–84 academic year; which they were a member on a previous stint from 1920–21 to 1924–25. The Knights previously competed in the Midwest Conference (MWC) from 1925–26 to 1982–83; although Carleton had dual conference membership with the MWC and the MIAC between 1921–22 and 1924–25.

All students must participate in physical education or athletic activities to fulfill graduation requirements.

=== Rivalries ===
Carleton's biggest athletic rival is St. Olaf College, located on the other side of Northfield. The Knights and the Oles contest six trophies in yearly matchups. The first trophy, "The Goat", was created in 1913 and goes to the winning men's basketball team. Carleton competes with Macalester College in the "Brain Bowl" for "The Book of Knowledge" trophy.

=== Club sports ===
The student-run Ultimate clubs have had national success; the school's top men's team, Carleton Ultimate Team (CUT), and women's team, Syzygy, are perennial national contenders in the USA Ultimate College Division I tournaments. CUT has qualified annually for nationals since 1989, and won the National Championship in 2001, 2009, 2011, 2017, and 2025. Syzygy has qualified for women's nationals all but one year since 1987, and won the National Championship in 2000 and 2026. The other men's Ultimate team, originally named the Gods of Plastic (GoP) and renamed Carleton House of Pancakes (CHOP) in 2021, won the 2010 and 2012 College Division III Open National Championships. Eclipse, another women's ultimate team at the college, won the College Division III Women's nationals in 2011, 2016, and 2017. Eclipse finished as Women's Division III runners up in sequential years in 2023 and 2024.

Carleton founded the first women's rugby club in the state of Minnesota in 1978 and went on to win the Division III National Championship in 2011.

== In popular culture ==
Pamela Dean set her fantasy novel Tam Lin (1991) at a fictional "Blackstock College", based on Dean's alma mater, Carleton. Dean's author's note begins, "Readers acquainted with Carleton College will find much that is familiar to them in the architecture, landscape, classes, terminology, and general atmosphere of Blackstock." Blackstock's buildings were given names that reference their counterparts at Carleton (e.g. Watson Hall becomes Holmes Hall, referring to Sherlock Holmes; Burton Hall becomes Taylor Hall, referring to the marriages of Richard Burton and Elizabeth Taylor).

== Notable alumni and faculty ==
=== Notable alumni ===
- Kai Bird, 1973, Pulitzer Prize-winning biographer and journalist
- Pierce Butler, 1887, US Supreme Court Justice
- Jonathan Capehart, 1989, journalist, winner of the 1999 Pulitzer Prize for Editorial Writing
- Jimmy Chin, 1996, Academy Award-winning director of Free Solo and professional rock climber
- Anthony Downs, 1952, economist and author of An Economic Theory of Democracy
- Freddie Gillespie (2017), basketball player in the Israeli Basketball Premier League
- John F. Harris, 1985, editor-in-chief of Politico
- Randall S. Herman, politician who served as acting governor of Guam
- Jane Elizabeth Hodgson, 1934, pioneer in women's abortion rights
- Christopher Kratt, 1992, TV and film producer, host of Zoboomafoo and Wild Kratts
- Naomi Kritzer, 1995, Locus Award- and Hugo Award-winning author of speculative fiction
- Melvin R. Laird, 1942, US Secretary of Defense from 1969 to 1973 under Richard Nixon
- Katherine Rowe, 1984, first female President of The College of William & Mary
- T. J. Stiles, 1986, two-time Pulitzer Prize-winning historian
- Douglas Vakoch, 1983, astrobiologist, president of METI (Messaging Extraterrestrial Intelligence)
- Thorstein Veblen, 1880, economist and sociologist, coined the concept of conspicuous consumption
- Shigeo Yamada, 1989, Japanese Ambassador to the United States (2023-present)
- Zach McGowan, 2002, film, television and voice actor Black Sails (TV series)

=== Notable faculty ===
- Ian Barbour, professor of religion; 1989–91 Gifford Lecturer on religion and science; winner of the 1999 Templeton Prize for Progress in Religion
- Laurence McKinley Gould, second-in-command to Richard E. Byrd on his first landmark expedition to Antarctica; professor of geology; Carleton College President from 1945 to 1962. The college's main library, Gould Library, is named for Gould.
- Gao Hong, composer and performer of Chinese music, among the world's top pipa players
- Paul Wellstone, U.S. Senator from Minnesota from 1991 until his death in 2002; professor of political science from 1969 to 1990
- Reed Whittemore, professor of English; poet; Poet Laureate Consultant in Poetry to the Library of Congress in 1964 and 1984

== Points of interest ==
- Carleton College Cowling Arboretum
- Goodsell Observatory
- Skinner Memorial Chapel
- The Cave
- Weitz Center for Creativity
- Willis Hall

== See also ==
- List of colleges and universities in Minnesota
