= North Country Cinema =

- Formation: 2005
- Type: Artist collective
- Headquarters: Calgary, Alberta, Canada
- Key people: Alexander Carson; Kyle Thomas; Sara Corry
- Website: www.northcountrycinema.com

North Country Cinema is a Canadian media arts collective based in Calgary, Alberta, Canada.

The company was founded in 2005 by filmmakers Alexander Carson, Nicholas Martin, and Kyle Thomas, who met at the Mel Hoppenheim School of Cinema at Concordia University in Montreal, Quebec. North Country Cinema produces and distributes director-driven film and video content, and has created award-winning works that have screened at major international festivals, including the Toronto International Film Festival and SXSW.

In 2011, Carson and Thomas completed "We Refuse To Be Cold" and Not Far From The Abattoir, respectively. These films combined to screen at over twenty-five international festivals and were both acquired by CBC Television for broadcast in 2012 and 2013. Both films focus on intimate narratives and personal storytelling, drawing from the experimental European New Wave cinemas of the 1960s and the gritty, character-driven American Cinema of the 1970s. In 2011, Calgary-based filmmaker Cameron Macgowan joined North Country Cinema following a collaboration with Thomas as producing partners on Not Far From The Abattoir. Although Nicholas Martin still collaborates with Carson and Thomas in various capacities, he is no longer a producing partner.

In 2013, North Country Cinema began production on Thomas' feature film The Valley Below, a multi-narrative drama set in the badlands of central Alberta. Following the announcement that the film would be funded through their inaugural Micro-Budget Production Program, Telefilm Canada named Kyle Thomas one of "10 Canadians to Watch at Cannes" in 2013. The Valley Below, originally titled Down In The Valley, was renamed to address "practical and creative concerns regarding the public representation of the film going forward" on August 15, 2013.

In 2014, Alexander Carson received the Golden Gate Award for New Visions at the San Francisco International Film Festival for his short film Numbers & Friends. In July 2014, North Country Cinema announced the production of its second feature film, O, Brazen Age, by writer/director Alexander Carson, produced with the support of Telefilm Canada and the Canada Council for the Arts.

In August, 2014, the Toronto International Film Festival announced its Canadian program, including the World Premiere of The Valley Below as part of official selection in the Discovery program at the 2014 festival. During the festival, The Valley Below was acquired for Canadian distribution by A71 Entertainment. Opening theatrically across Canada in March 2015, The Valley Below garnered considerable critical attention, including positive reviews from both Canadian national newspapers: The National Post and The Globe and Mail. The film garnered two Canadian Screen Award nominations at the 3rd Canadian Screen Awards, in the categories of Best Supporting Actor for Kris Demeanor and Best Original Song for Dan Mangan's song "Wants".

In September, 2015, the Vancouver International Film Festival announced that O, Brazen Age, Alexander Carson's feature-length debut, would have its World Premiere at the festival as part of the Canadian Images program. The film went on to screen at numerous film festivals throughout 2016 and earned positive reviews from NOW Magazine and The Globe and Mail when it was released theatrically in Canada in 2017. O, Brazen Age was also heralded as a success by Canadian filmmakers Atom Egoyan and Guy Maddin.

North Country Cinema's third feature film Range Roads, directed by Kyle Thomas, was released in 2021. The film premiered at the Cinequest Film & Creativity Festival in San Jose, California before winning the awards for Best Feature and Best Director at the 2021 Rosie Awards in Alberta. Alana Hawley Purvis received a Canadian Screen Award nomination for Best Actress at the 10th Canadian Screen Awards in 2022 for her performance as "Frankie". Range Roads is distributed in Canada by Game Theory and in the United States by Freestyle Releasing.

North Country Cinema's fourth feature film Alberta Number One, directed by Alexander Carson, premiered at Montréal's Festival du nouveau cinéma and the Chicago International Film Festival in 2024. Alberta Number One was acquired by Game Theory Films for North American distribution in 2025.

== Production partners ==
Since 2005, North Country Cinema has produced work with the support of numerous artistic and cultural institutions and funding agencies across Canada, including Telefilm Canada, the Canada Council for the Arts, the Alberta Foundation for the Arts, the Ontario Arts Council, the National Film Board of Canada, the Canadian Media Production Association, the Alberta Media Fund, and the Toronto Arts Council.

== Filmography ==
- Last Chance Saloon (2007)
- Searching for Heartbreak (2007)
- Ghost Town (2008)
- Lucy James pt. 1 (2008)
- Last Communication with Laura (2009)
- The Liminal State of Decay (2010)
- We Refuse to Be Cold (2011)
- Not Far from the Abattoir (2011)
- Braids (2012)
- Black Hills (2012)
- Numbers & Friends (2013)
- The Post (2013)
- The Valley Below (2014)
- Back Streets (2014)
- O, Brazen Age (2015)
- The New Canada (2016)
- Range Roads (2021)
- Alberta Number One (2024)
- Smudge the Blades (2026)
