= Window on Main Street =

American television series

- Genre: Comedy drama
- Created by: Roswell Rogers
- Starring: Robert Young; Constance Moore; Ford Rainey
- Theme music composer: Irving Friedman
- Country of origin: United States
- Original language: English
- No. of seasons: 1
- No. of episodes: 34

Production
- Producers: Robert Young; Eugene B. Rodney
- Running time: ca. 25 minutes
- Production companies: Rodney-Young Productions; Temopic Enterprises

Original release
- Network: CBS
- Release: October 2, 1961 – May 23, 1962

Window on Main Street is an American comedy-drama television series starring Robert Young about an author who returns to his home town after an absence of many years to write about the people and events there. Original episodes aired from October 2, 1961, until May 23, 1962.

== Synopsis ==
Cameron "Cam" Garrett Brooks left his boyhood home town, Millsburg, in 1934, hoping to become a wealthy and famous writer. He lived in New York City, Connecticut, and France, but fortune and fame eluded him. In the aftermath of the death of his wife Selma and their child in an automobile accident on an icy road, he returns to Millsburg in 1961 as a struggling author. He resides in a room on the second story of the Majestic Hotel with a balcony overlooking Main Street, planning to use the people and events he sees on the street as inspiration for stories in a new book he is writing called Window on Main Street. His childhood friend Lloyd Ramsey, now the editor of the town's newspaper, tries to talk him out of it, telling him that the town has changed a great deal since he moved away and little is left of what he remembers from his childhood. Cam remains committed to his plan, however, believing that the people of Millsburg have remarkable stories for him to tell. Each week, he writes a chapter of his book, based on that week's story.

Chris Logan, a widow who works as Lloyd's assistant at the newspaper, is Cam's romantic interest, and Arny is her young son. Harry McGill is the hotel's desk clerk. Other people Cam frequently encounters include Mrs. Miller and her son Roddy, Miss Wycliffe, Dick Aldrich, and Phil Rowan.

In the spring of 1962, the hotel closed temporarily for renovations, and Cam moved in with its owner, Wally Evans, and his wife Peggy.

== Cast ==
- Robert Young....Cameron "Cam" Garrett Brooks
- Constance Moore....Chris Logan
- Ford Rainey....Lloyd Ramsey
- Brad Berwick....Arny Logan
- James Davidson....Wally Evans
- Carol Byron....Peggy Evans
- Coleen Gray....Miss Wycliffe
- Warner Jones....Harry McGill
- Marilyn Harvey...Mrs. Miller
- Tim Matheson....Roddy Miller
- William Cort...Dick Aldrich
- Richard Wyler...Phil Rowan
- Mary Adams...Lavinia Webster

== Production ==
After a successful six-season run from 1954 to 1960 in Father Knows Best — prime-time reruns of which still ran on network television during the 1961–1962 season — Robert Young returned to series television in 1961–1962 in Window on Main Street. Roswell Rogers created the show and served as its principal scriptwriter, Young and Eugene B. Rodney co-owned and co-produced it, and Irving "Izzy" Friedman composed the music. Rogers, Rodney, and Friedman had performed the same roles for Father Knows Best. Window on Main Street was filmed at Desilu Studios.

CBS gave Young and Rodney complete creative control over the show, which had a moralizing and sentimental tone very similar to that of Father Knows Best. By not tying the central character, again portrayed by Young, to a domestic situation, however, Window on Main Street allowed the exploration of non-family themes that would not have fit into the premise of Father Knows Best. However Window on Main Street never gained the audience of Father Knows Best and lasted for only one season.

== Broadcast history ==
Window on Main Street premiered on CBS on October 2, 1961, airing on Mondays at 8:30 p.m. In mid-February 1962 it moved to 8:00 p.m. on Wednesdays, where it remained for the rest of its run. CBS cancelled it after only one season, and its last original episode aired on May 23, 1962.

After the show ended, CBS broadcast prime-time reruns of Window on Main Street during its normal Wednesday time slot The last prime-time rerun aired on September 12, 1962.

== Episodes ==
No.	Title	Directed by	Written by	Original release date
1	"The Return"	Richard Dunlap	Roswell Rogers	October 2, 1961
The pilot episode for the series. After moving away from his boyhood home town, Millsburg, in 1934, Cam returns to write about the town and its people, discovering that it has changed a lot while he was away. Before leaving in 1934, he had gone to a secluded place to consider his future plans, and a young girl named Tina had followed him there. He had promised Tina that he would return to Millsburg as a rich and famous author someday and give her a kiss, and he wrote her a letter, telling her to be sure to keep it because it would be valuable someday after he became famous. Fame and wealth have eluded him, but after he returns to Millsburg in 1961 he receives half of his letter. He discovers that Tina had kept his letter for all those years, but fails to realize that Tina as an adult is Chris Logan, assistant to editor Lloyd Ramsey at the town's newspaper. Rick Bache, Joy Lane, Charles Thompson, and Erin O'Brien Moore guest-star.
2	"The Teacher"	Richard Dunlap	Roswell Rogers	October 9, 1961
Alternative title "First Romance." Miss Wilma Henderson is a prim woman who has reputation with her students and her supervisors as an exemplary teacher of good character, and Arny has a crush on her and often sings her praises. But Arny's attitude changes abruptly when he sees her in a convertible kissing Harry, who is known as a local lothario. Cam soon confirms what Arny saw when he surprises Wilma and Harry while they are having an intimate conversation. After she threatens to resign over the incident, Cam intervenes. She wants to break the relationship off because Harry is not at all like the man she had planned on meeting. Brooks reminds her that no one's life ever plays out the way we expected they would, and convinces her to stay on as a teacher and deal with her situation — and he adds her as a character in Chapter 3 of his book. Lisabeth Hush, Tom Quain, and Mary Adams guest-star.
3	"A Doctor Comes to Town"	Richard Dunlap	Theodore and Mathilde Ferro	October 16, 1961
Chris's cousin, Dr. John "Buzz" Neldrum, returns to Millsburg after a long absence to set up a medical practice, but after several weeks he has attracted only one patient because during his childhood he had a reputation as a prankster who wrought havoc around Millsburg — and now the townspeople find it hard to take him seriously and trust him with their health. Buzz is about to give up and leave town to accept an offer to work in another doctor's practice in West Virginia when a patient comes to him that makes him feel that she would be lost without him. It is the breakthrough that he needed, and his practice immediately begins to grow as the people of Millsburg see that he is a competent physician. Karl Swenson, Bob Hastings, Nelson Olmsted, Tom Daly, Sondra Rodgers, Ben McAtee, and John Lupton guest-star.
4	"The Woman Behind Chapter Four"	Richard Dunlap	John McGreevey	October 23, 1961
Alternative title "The Chambermaid." The Majestic Hotel's second-floor chambermaid, Vinia Webster, has a reputation as a kind-hearted person. Cam is surprised to discover that she once was a wealthy member of Millsburg's high society and a prominent name in the town's social registry. Vinia's husband had provided her with a lavish lifestyle, but when he died, his unwise financial decisions had left her with a mountain of surprise debt and forced her to take her menial job. She hated her job at first, but has come to cherish it because it makes her feel useful. Her family would believe it is beneath her station, however, and she has not told them what she does for a living. Cam and Arny help her hide her job from her nephew and his wife when they come to town and offer to take her to a comfortable retirement home — but she refuses to go, claiming that the guests and residents of the hotel need her too much for her to leave. Cam writes Chapter 4 of his book about her. Mary Adams, Lauren Gilbert, Chet Stratton, Lia Waggner, Ann Seaton, Betsy Robinson, Jane Romeyn, and Marie Pringle and guest-star.
5	"College"	Unknown	Unknown	October 30, 1961
Alternative title "The Boy Who's Got It Made." After Cam gets to know Leonard Greenough, a boy who works at a gasoline station, he decides that Leonard can do more in life than work there and convinces him that he should go to college to open up greater opportunities for himself. Leonard's father is the owner and operator of the gasoline station, and he wants Leonard to stay home and take over the family business. He sees no sense in Leonard going to college and becomes angry with Cam for suggesting it — and Leonard becomes quite conflicted and confused. Les Damon, Douglas Lambert, and Brad Berwick guest-star.
6	"The Haunted House"	Richard Dunlap	Roswell Rogers	November 6, 1961
Arny and his friends suddenly become very interested in the old abandoned Stoddard house in Millsburg, allegedly haunted and known for images of ghosts in its broken windows. To see if the house really is haunted, Cam and Lloyd camp out there. They discover the reason for the apparitions in the windows, and decide to keep it a secret so that old house will retain its mystery and charm. Amy Douglass, Kay Stewart, Les Damon, Stanley Fafara, Bob Slade, and Lester Maxwell guest-star.
7	"The Editor's Daughter"	Richard Dunlap	Theodore & Mathilde Ferro	November 13, 1961
Lloyd's daughter, 16-year-old Evelyn, envisions a very romantic life for herself and her boyfriend Roy, despite what any adults may think. Lloyd disapproves of Roy, but Evelyn wants to marry him, so Evelyn and Roy plan to elope. Cam appears to be helping them, but actually is planting doubts about the elopement in their minds. Evelyn and Roy get as far as using a ladder for the elopement before they have a change of heart and decide to let marriage wait. Kay Stewart, Roberta Fields, Marshall Kent, Lee Jones, Brenda Scott, and Peter Helm guest-star.
8	"The Big Spender"	Richard Dunlap	Joel Malone & Tommy Tomlinson	November 20, 1961
Ellis Carter, who with his brother Ethan ran the Carter Brothers Junk Shop down the street from the Majestic Hotel and squirreled away almost every dollar they earned, moves into the hotel and becomes Cam's neighbor. Ellis found his brother domineering, and now that he has moved into the hotel, he wants independence and to spend some of his money and have fun — but he has trouble breaking away from Ethan, who forcefully protests his decision. Cam takes up the challenge of teaching Ellis how to spend money responsibly. Mary Adams, Glen Vernon, Rand Barker, Jack Bradford, John McLiam, and Alexander Lockwood guest-star.
9	"Day in the Life of the Editor"	Unknown	Unknown	November 27, 1961
Cam writes a chapter in his book about a day in the life of editor Lloyd Ramsey, who often receives interesting letters from his readers that he answers in print. Cam chooses the day that Lloyd receives a letter from a little boy asking the question "I know that God started the world, but who started God?" Lloyd struggles with what to print to explain to the boy where God came from, spending time thinking about the question and even visiting the library to research it, but ultimately visits the boy's home and tells him he does not have an answer. Then the boy answers the question himself by saying "God just is." J. Edward McKinley, Harriet MacGibbon, and Robert White guest-star.
10	"The $1.19 Thief"	Richard Dunlap	Roswell Rogers	December 4, 1961
After watching his father work hard for years without saving enough money to buy the boat he has always wanted, a young man named Elroy Paulsen decides it is better to grab what you want right now. Elroy breaks into Cam's room at the Majestic Hotel, but all he finds is $1.19 that Cam left on his deck to pay for dry cleaning, missing a $10.00 bill under some papers on the desk. Cam comes home and surprises Elroy, finding him hiding nervously on the balcony. Unafraid of Elroy, Cam talks to him and decides he is just confused and deserves a second chance. When Harry's daughter stops by to remind Cam not to be late for her performance in an operetta at school, Cam introduces Elroy to her. After talking to her, Elroy decides to go to the school to see her sing and get an honest job rather than spend his life as a criminal.
11	"The Double Life of Julia Cosgrove"	Unknown	Unknown	December 11, 1961
Cam is surprised that the mechanic working on cars in the local garage is a young woman — and even more surprised that she is the daughter of one of Millsburg's most prominent families. Guest star: Anne Helm
12	"Christmas Memory"	Richard Dunlap	Roswell Rogers	December 18, 1961
On Christmas Eve, Cam goes to the Logans' house for dinner. When he sees the gift of a butter churn under the Christmas tree there, he thinks about his wife and child's death in an automobile accident on an icy road and remembers an argument he had with his late wife concerning the butter churn she gave him as a present on their last Christmas together and how they subsequently made up and pledged to be together in spirit during the holidays even if they are separated. The thoughts cause him to sink into despair and he leaves the dinner early and walks the streets of Millsburg. He encounters Ludwig, the Majestic Hotel's janitor, who also is feeling down because his annual stint as a department-store Santa Claus has come to an end for another year. When Cam sees Ludwig, he remembers that while playing Santa at the store, Ludwig had said that Christmas isn't just the week leading up to December 25 but rather is the entire year. The thought cheers Cam, and after he reminds Ludwig of it, Ludwig also regains the Christmas spirit, and both of them go to the Logans' house for the remainder of Christmas Eve. Mary Adams, Amy Douglas, Jean Gillespie, Claire Wilcock, and Ludwig Stössel guest-star.
13	"The Charity Drive"	Unknown	Unknown	December 25, 1961
Alternative title "The Joiner." Although he does not want the position and feels that he does not have the time for it, Cam reluctantly accepts the presidency of the Millsburg Charity Drive, believing the charity drive is important. His appointment to the position upsets Hub Hartwig, who did want the job and thought he was a shoo-in for it. Eddie Firestone, Malcolm Atterbury, and Louise Lorimer guest-star.
14	"Arny's Revolt"	Unknown	Unknown	January 1, 1962
Arny rebels against female domination of his life and moves in with Cam.
15	"The Mixing Bowl"	Unknown	Unknown	January 8, 1962
Lloyd's wife Meg begins writing a cooking column called "The Mixing Bowl" for a rival newspaper — to Lloyd's displeasure.
16	"The Persevering Villain"	Unknown	Unknown	January 15, 1962
A cow's milk turns sour after Chris wishes it to, and it is up to Cam to convince the cow's owner, a stingy farmer, that Chris does not have supernatural powers.
17	"Girl with the Rose Colored Eyes"	Unknown	Unknown	January 22, 1962
Cam tries to find out why a young girl has begun to tell stories about her grandfather that are not true, making him seem to be a hero.
18	"Front-Page Hero"	Unknown	Unknown	January 29, 1962
A department store clerk rescues a prominent citizen of Millsburg from the river and learns how difficult it is to live life as a hero.
19	"A Case for Justice"	Unknown	Unknown	February 5, 1962
An 11-year-old boy wants his younger brother to go to jail — but also wants him to have a lawyer so he can have a fair trial.
20	"The Boy Who Laughed Too Much"	Unknown	Unknown	February 14, 1962
Alternative title "The Boy Who Got Too Many Laughs." Ziggy Vance has a reputation as the class clown, but he wants Cam to write a serious speech for him so that he can impress his mature classmate, Sally. The speech fails miserably, and Ziggy thinks he has no chance with her — but when he stops trying to be someone he's not, Sally decides to go out with him. This episode included a laugh track. Michael J. Pollard and Dana Whittaker guest-star.
21	"Time Runs Back"	Unknown	Unknown	February 21, 1962
Cam is shaken to discover that a psychic phenomenon he once described in one of his novels has happened in real life to a young woman and disputed her romance.
22	"The Rainmaker"	Unknown	Unknown	February 28, 1962
The town mocks a sharpeyed old farmer who claims that he can make it rain, but Cam becomes intrigued by his methods.
23	"The Rumor on the Campus"	Unknown	Unknown	March 7, 1962
A college student seeking an issue to run on in a campaign for student government makes a college professor the target of a smear campaign.
24	"The Exclusive Story"	Unknown	Unknown	March 14, 1962
A cub reporter gets his first big news break — an unusual confession that almost makes his job too hard for him to handle. Guest stars: Larry Gates and Ben Cooper.
25	"Ours Is a Nice House"	Unknown	Unknown	March 21, 1962
Cam vacates the Majestic Hotel while it undergoes renovation and takes a room in the home of a struggling young couple, Wally and Peggy Evans.
26	"The Big Chance"	Unknown	Unknown	March 28, 1962
After Cam decides that the director of the Millsburg Community Theater has acting talent and persuades a Broadway producer to observe her, she is surprisingly reluctant to accept an offer from the producer.
27	"It's Blessed to Receive"	Unknown	Unknown	April 4, 1962
Cam repays Wally and Peggy for their hospitality by buying them a hi-fi set, and the gift leads to unexpected consequences for Wally. Yale Summers guest-stars.
28	"The Fast Shuffle"	Unknown	Unknown	April 11, 1962
Peggy is displeased with Wally's book-sharing plan — and even more displeased that his book-sharing partner is an attractive young woman.
29	"To You, From Me"	Unknown	Unknown	April 18, 1962
After Peggy loses a diamond ring Wally gave her, she asks Cam how she can keep Wally from finding out.
30	"A Classroom Romance"	Unknown	Unknown	April 25, 1962
A shy college student is coaxed into believing that his English professor has a romantic interest in him.
31	"A Voice in the Tree"	Unknown	Unknown	May 2, 1962
Cam receives an envelope containing some poems written in a child's handwriting and signed by 12-year-old Alicia Stroud, who asks him to help her get her poetry published. When she tells him she writes the verse at the urging of a voice coming through the branches of a tree, he decides to investigate. Guest star: Christine Jordan.
32	"The Free Soul"	Unknown	Unknown	May 9, 1962
A visitor to Millsburg clothed in Western wear tries to revive the townspeople's interest in America's past.
33	"The Magic Lamp"	Unknown	Unknown	May 16, 1962
Roddy acquires a small lamp and soon has everyone in town believing that it has magical powers.
34	"A Job for the Summer"	Unknown	Unknown	May 23, 1962
As the academic year ends at the college, Wally and Miss Wycliffe both face the problem of summer jobs.
