= Cameron Macgowan =

Canadian writer, director, and producer

- Occupations: Film director, screenwriter, film producer
- Years active: 2009–present
- Website: www.awkwardsilencio.com

Cameron Macgowan, is a Canadian writer, director, and producer. His first feature film as a Writer/Director Red Letter Day (2019 film) premiered at the Cinequest Film Festival in 2019. The film was a hit on the international genre film festival circuit with screenings at London FrightFest Film Festival, Screamfest Horror Film Festival, Fantaspoa, Brussels International Fantastic Film Festival and more. The film received positive critical attention, including Screen Anarchy saying "It plays like a modern mash-up of David Cronenberg's Shivers (film) and Kinji Fukasaku's Battle Royale (film)." and renowned English journalist Kim Newman saying "A terrific premise, ferociously well worked out, and an excellent performance from Dawn Van de Schoot as an unwilling tiger mommy.".

Macgowan was also a Producer on The Valley Below, which premiered at the prestigious Toronto International Film Festival in 2014. The film garnered two Canadian Screen Award nominations in the categories of Best Supporting Actor for Kris Demeanor and Best Original Song for Dan Mangan's "Wants".

== Career ==
=== Directing and producing ===
Macgowan is a founding member of Awkward Silencio and is a former member of North Country Cinema. His work has screened at major international festivals, including the Toronto International Film Festival, Fantasia International Film Festival, London FrightFest Film Festival and SXSW. His eccentric work as a writer and director has explored subjects ranging from Murderous Suburbanites to Erotic Trolls.

In 2013, his short film Liebe (Love) was selected as a Vimeo Staff Pick and as a result garnered over 130,000 views. That same year he was recognized as one of Calgary's Top 40 under 40 by Avenue Magazine. In 2019, Macgowan's debut feature film Red Letter Day was distributed by Epic Pictures Group under their DREAD label on Blu-ray and VOD in November 2019. after a hugely successful film festival run.

== Filmography as Writer/Director ==
- 2010: Bad Dad
- 2012: Black Hills
- 2013: Liebe (Love)
- 2014: Goodbye Moment
- 2014: Back Streets
- 2016: Luxure (Lust)
- 2019: Red Letter Day

== Filmography as Producer ==
- 2011: Not Far From the Abattoir
- 2014: The Valley Below
- 2015: O, Brazen Age
- 2019: Red Letter Day
