= Smudge the Blades =

2026 Canadian comedy-drama film

- Directed by: Cody Lightning
- Written by: Cody Lightning; Samuel Miller
- Produced by: Sara Corry; Dylan Jackknife Morin; Hayley Morin; Kyle Thomas
- Starring: Ed Helms; Paulina Alexis; Jana Schmieding
- Cinematography: Liam Mitchell
- Edited by: Lev Lewis; Thomas Hackett
- Music by: Matthew Cardinal; Marek Tyler
- Production companies: Lightning Mill; North Country Cinema
- Release date: September 12, 2026 (TIFF)
- Running time: 96 minutes
- Country: Canada
- Language: English

Smudge the Blades is a 2026 Canadian sports comedy-drama film. Directed by Cody Lightning, the film centers on the Treaty 6 Blades, an Indigenous youth ice hockey team.

== Plot ==
The Treaty 6 Blades are a U-18 hockey team from a reserve outside Edmonton, Alberta. After being booted from their city league in their last year of eligibility and their coach (Helms) quits, the team enters northern Alberta's rough-and-tumble Country League with a Zamboni driver (Lightning) stepping in to coach.

== Cast ==
- Cody Lightning as William "Willie" Gladue, the Zamboni-driver-turned-coach of the Blades
- Paulina Alexis as Jaycee Pipestem, a strong player and the only female member of the Blades
- Treycen Wuttunee as Leland Ward, the captain of the Blades
- Isaiah Kakepetum as Taran Okimâw, a young star being scouted by the upper leagues
- Jana Schmeiding as Chanelle Okimâw, Taran's mother
- River Rayne Thomas as Damon Buffalo, a physically intimidating player with a reputation for violence
- Elijah James Lee Moar as Broxy Lightning, the Blades' foul mouthed goalie
- Ezekiel James Mekanek as Gus "Gussy" Saddleback
- Tyler Halcrow as Kyson Littlechild, a player on the Blades
- Ed Helms as Bud Bradshaw, a former coach for the Edmonton Oilers who starts the season as the Blades's coach
- David McNally as Stan
- Tom Carey as Tom
- David Lawrence as Crooked Referee
- Gillian Anderson as Damon's aunt

== Production ==
The film first announced casting for Indigenous actors to play the hockey team in 2024, and was shot in Edmonton, Alberta, in spring 2025.

== Release ==
The film premiered in the Centrepiece program at the 2026 Toronto International Film Festival.

== Critical response ==
For That Shelf, Pat Mullen wrote that "While Lightning’s sophomore feature shows a little more room to grow behind the camera, the jump from Hey, Viktor! to Blades shows considerable promise. Smudge the Blades excels whenever Lightning holds the camera’s attention. That confidence, however, doesn’t quite translate to the lens’s focus with the other players. The film’s a little rough around the edges with the rest of the team when it comes to the synergy between the technical elements and the star power, but when Lightning transfers his relationship with the camera to his co-stars, he’s looking at whatever the hockey equivalent of a grand slam is. (I don’t know sports metaphors.)"

Nathan Caddell for The Georgia Strait writes "You wouldn't be able to tell that most of the kids in the film had never acted before, as their scenes feel lived-in and authentic. Maybe that's because they'd never acted before? Whatever the case, the movie works in large part because you believe in the players."

== Awards ==
At TIFF, the film won the Best Canadian Discovery Award, with Lightning dedicating much of his acceptance speech to a tribute to his mother, actress Georgina Lightning, who died just a few days before the film's TIFF premiere.

At the 2026 Vancouver International Film Festival, the film won the Audience Award for the Northern Lights program.

The film won the Best Narrative Feature Jury Award at the 2026 Santa Fe International Film Festival. It is also slated to screen in the Borsos Competition program at the 2026 Whistler Film Festival.
