= Bridwell =

Bridwell is a surname. Notable people with the surname include:

- Al Bridwell (1884–1969), American baseball player
- Ben Bridwell (born 1978), American musician
- E. Nelson Bridwell (1931–1987), American writer
- Gene Porter Bridwell (born 1935), American director
- Jim Bridwell (1944–2018), American rock climber
- Lowell K. Bridwell (1924–1986), American journalist
- Norman Bridwell (1928–2014), American writer
- Parker Bridwell (born 1991), American baseball player
