= Paradise Fears =

American alternative rock band

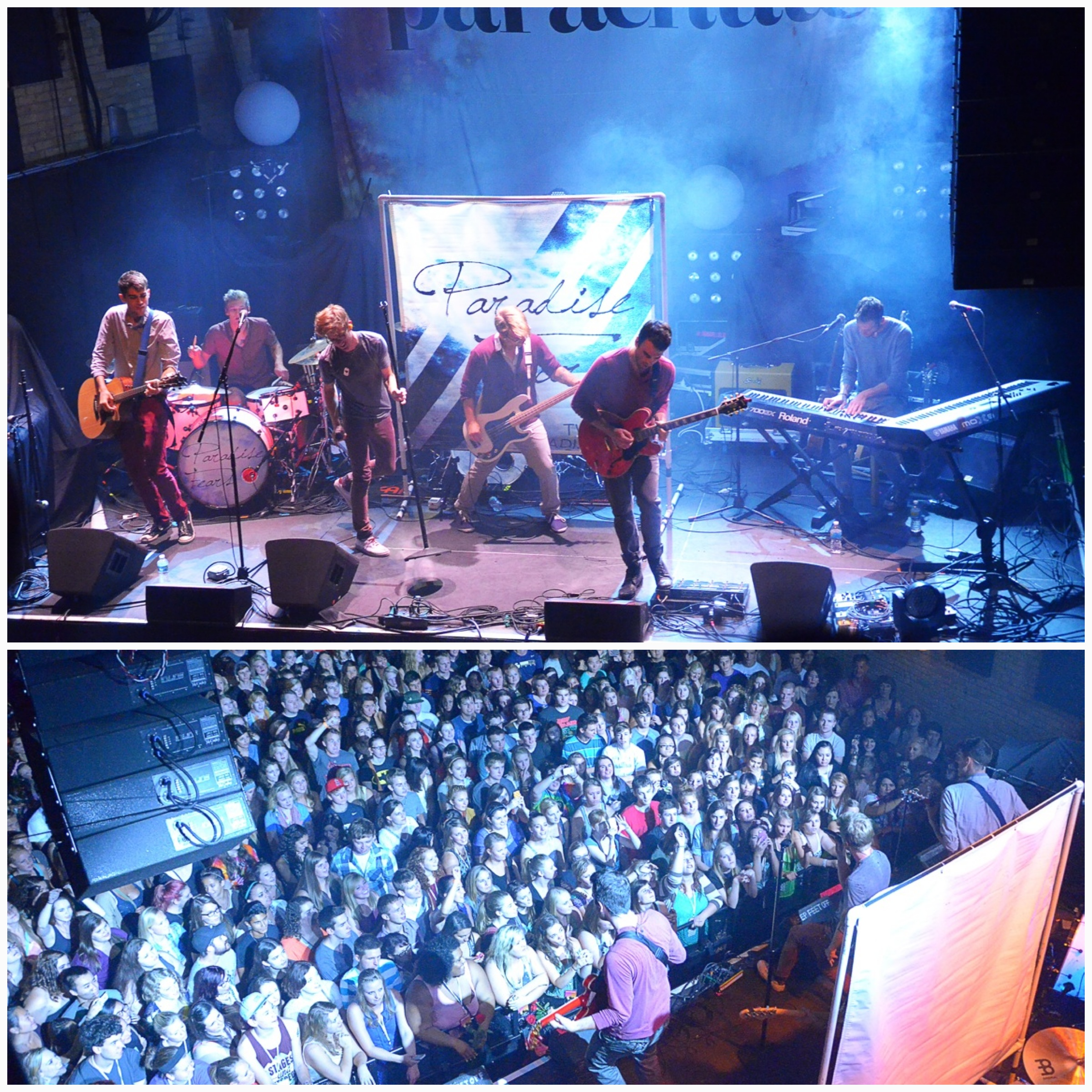
- Paradise Fears performing live in Minneapolis

Background information
- Origin: Vermillion, South Dakota, United States
- Genres: Alternative rock, pop rock
- Years active: 2007–present
- Label: DigSin
- Members: Sam Miller; Cole Andre; Michael Walker; Jordan Merrigan; Marcus Sand; Lucas Zimmerman
- Past members: Joey Russ
- Website: www.paradisefears.com

Paradise Fears is an American alternative rock band from Vermillion, South Dakota.

The band has been touring and releasing music independently since 2011. Their 2013 album, Battle Scars, peaked at No. 2 on the iTunes Alternative chart.

== History ==
Forming as a group of high school friends playing cover songs for school talent shows in the small town of Vermillion, South Dakota, the members of Paradise Fears began by deferring college admission for a year in 2010, instead working full-time jobs to raise money to record their debut album, Yours Truly, with Zack Odom, Kenneth Mount, and Jordan Schmidt. Upon recording, the band set out following other pop rock tours and selling their CD to fans waiting in line. The album sold 24,000 total copies and peaked at number 9 on the Billboard Uncharted Chart.

Following tours also gained the attention of pop rock act All Time Low, who brought Paradise Fears along as the opening act on their 2011 The Rise and Fall of my Pants Tour. The following January, the band supported The Cab and The Summer Set on their Everything's Fine Symphony Soldier Tour and did a full US tour of intimate show private parties for fans. After fans took over a Seaworld naming competition, Seaworld San Diego named an Olive Ridley Sea Turtle after the band.

In the summer of 2012, Paradise Fears headlined the Sanctuary Mini-Tour, following the re-release of "Sanctuary". Originally released in 2011, the new version contained a speech made by lead singer Sam Miller halfway through.

Later in 2012, the band supported Forever the Sickest Kids and Go Radio, respectively. They also began releasing cover songs on YouTube. Their most popular, a cover of "Payphone" by Maroon 5, amassed over three million views. In 2013, they performed on the Resolution Tour with Action Item, Max Schneider, and Before You Exit.

On June 25, 2013, Paradise Fears released an 8-track EP, Battle Scars. The album peaked at No. 2 on the US iTunes Alternative Chart and No. 19 on the Overall Album Chart. Following the release of the album, the band supported Parachute on their 2013 Overnight tour. On October 31, they released an extended edition of Battle Scars, featuring the single, "Who You Are".

On January 31, 2014, the band released an acoustic version of Battle Scars, featuring a cover of "Landslide" by Fleetwood Mac and a "Battle Scars Sonata", a piano-only track combining all of the songs from the album. In February 2014, they embarked on the "Acoustic & In the Round Tour", where they performed stripped down, intimate versions of the songs on a riser built in the middle of the audience.

April 2014 saw the band's first trip to the UK, supporting The Summer Set on their UK tour.

Throughout the late spring of 2014, they were participants and eventually finalists in the Macy's Rising Star contest, placing third.

In June 2014, drummer Lucas Zimmerman announced he would be leaving the band to return to school to do humanitarian work. In his goodbye post, he expressed continued love and support for the band. Joey Russ, formerly a member of The Role Call, took over as the live drummer of the band until late 2015.

In July 2014, Paradise Fears announced that they had signed with Nashville label DigSin and released their next single, "You to Believe In". They supported the single by setting out on their first full US headlining tour, the Live Forever Tour, featuring support from Hollywood Ending, Against the Current, William Beckett (former frontman of The Academy Is...), and Nick Thomas of The Spill Canvas.

In 2015, the band did two conventional tours. They set out early in the year on the Good Guys & a Girl Tour with Andy Grammer, Alex & Sierra, and Rachel Platten. In November 2015 they were on The Returning West tour with The Rocket Summer, in which Daniel Sumstine played live drums.

Following The Returning West Tour, the band's full-length album Life in Real Time was released via DigSin on December 4, 2015, and was followed by a "bus tour" which allowed fans in major cities along the east coast and in the Midwest who had pre-ordered the album to attend private performances on the band's tour bus. They played an album release show in New York City in early January 2016 at The Studio at Webster Hall. The rest of the year was nearly silent with the exception of a few college shows and two opening performances with Before You Exit.

In October 2016, Sam Miller took to the band's tumblr to speak on the silence of the band during 2016. While he stated that the band isn't breaking up, they are slowing down and exploring other outlets. "As long as the six of us exist, there will always be a Paradise Fears", Miller wrote. This was followed by an announcement of three shows in New York City, Cambridge, and Chicago to happen in January 2017 and the release of a new "more than acoustic" EP, Someone Else's Dream.

In May 2019, the band announced that they would be holding three shows, under the title "Ten Years of Fear", playing music from the past ten years of their discography. These shows, taking place in July 2019, were held in Chicago, Toronto, and New York City. At the same time, the band re-released "Color" from their previous album Someone Else's Dream, and "Heaven (The Walkmen Cover)" on an EP.

In April 2023, Paradise Fears announced that they would be embarking on another tour in New York City, Chicago, and Nashville. The tour sold out within 5 minutes of going on sale, and all the venues were later upgraded to larger spaces.

In February 2026, the group announced that they would be touring once again, opening for The Cab in the back half of their Back From the Dead Tour in June 2026.

Miller has also been a novelist and screenwriter, most noted as co-writer of the 2023 film Hey, Viktor!.

== Members ==
- Sam Miller – vocals
- Cole Andre – vocals, rhythm guitar
- Michael Walker – keys, vocals
- Jordan Merrigan – lead guitar, trumpet
- Marcus Sand – bass
- Lucas Zimmerman – drums

Former members

- Joey Russ – drums

Live members

- Daniel Sumstine – drums

== Discography ==
Albums and EPs
Title	Album details
The Secret To Dropping Out EP	Released: March 17, 2009
Make Them Believe EP	Released: March 16, 2010
Yours Truly	Released: June 14, 2011
Acoustic EP	Released: October 11, 2011
Battle Scars	Released: June 25, 2013
Battle Scars Extended Edition	Released: October 31, 2013
Battle Scars (Acoustic)	Released: January 31, 2014
Life in Real Time	Released: December 4, 2015
Someone Else's Dream (Reworks & Revisits)	Released: November 4, 2016
Color	Released: July 29, 2019

Singles
Title	Album details
"Waste of Time"	Released: May 31, 2011
"Sanctuary"	Released: May 1, 2012
"Home"	Released: June 23, 2012
"The Fighter"	Released: August 8, 2012
"Warrior"	Released: January 2, 2013
"Lullaby"	Released: May 14, 2013
"Mirrors"	Released: April 10, 2013
"Who You Are"	Released: September 3, 2013
"You to Believe In"	Released: June 24, 2014
"Who We Were With"	Released: November 18, 2014
"Reunion"	Released: May 12, 2015
