= Range Roads =

- Directed by: Kyle Thomas
- Written by: Kyle Thomas
- Produced by: Sara Corry; Kyle Thomas
- Starring: Alana Hawley Purvis; Joe Perry
- Cinematography: Mike McLaughlin
- Edited by: Kyle Thomas
- Production company: North Country Cinema
- Release date: March 20, 2021 (Cinequest)
- Running time: 86 minutes
- Country: Canada
- Language: English

Range Roads is a Canadian drama film, directed by Kyle Thomas and released in 2021 by Calgary-based production company North Country Cinema. The film stars Alana Hawley Purvis as Frankie King, an actress who has been estranged from her family for many years but is returning home following the death of her parents, who must navigate continued tensions between her and her brother Grayson (Joe Perry).

The cast also includes Nicole de Boer, Kris Demeanor, Jude Thomas, and Trevor Campbell, as well as the acting debut of country singer Chad Brownlee.

The film had entered the planning stages in 2013, while Thomas's prior film The Valley Below, whose cast included Hawley Purvis, Perry and Demeanor, was still in production, but due to the various other projects that Thomas and the cast were involved in and the challenges of raising money to fund it, it took several years of discussions for Range Roads to take shape. The film was shot in the Olds area of Alberta in 2020.

The film premiered at the 2021 Cinequest Film & Creativity Festival in March 2021, and had its Canadian debut on April 17 as part of the Canadian Film Festival.

== Critical response ==
Reviewing the film for The Mercury News, Randy Myers wrote that "Thomas shows a natural grace with his storytelling, delicately handling a surprising family secret, and making Frankie a complicated and likeable character. 'Range Roads' might travel a familiar road, but its characters and situations are refreshingly real."

== Awards ==
The film won the awards for Best Feature and Best Director at the 2021 Rosie Awards.

Hawley Purvis received a Canadian Screen Award nomination for Best Actress at the 10th Canadian Screen Awards in 2022.
