= Izzy Friedman =

American jazz musician

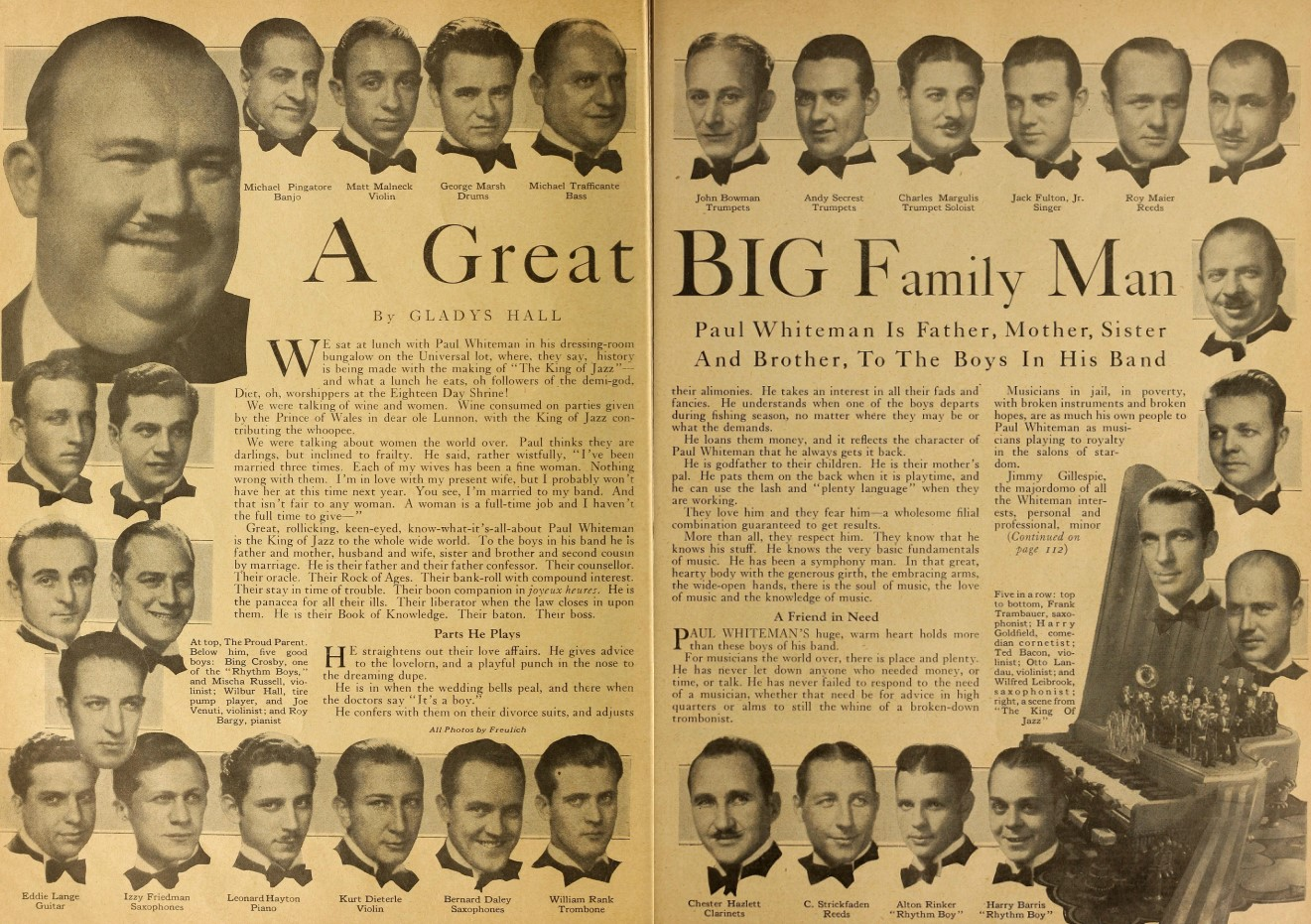
Paul Whiteman Orchestra - Motion Picture, June 1930

Irving "Izzy" Friedman (December 25, 1903 – November 21, 1981) was an American jazz reedist, best known for playing clarinet on records released by Paul Whiteman and Bix Beiderbecke in the 1920s.

== Background ==
Friedman was born in Linton, Indiana and worked in his youth in a theater band in Terre Haute. He relocated to Chicago in 1923, then to New York City in 1924. From 1925 to 1926 he was a member of Vincent Lopez's orchestra, and worked in Paul Whiteman's band from 1928 to 1930, including in the film King of Jazz. He also recorded on the side with Bix Beiderbecke, Hoagy Carmichael, Eddie Lang, Frankie Trumbauer, and Joe Venuti. Friedman moved to Los Angeles in the early 1930s, where he worked as a session musician for several decades.

Friedman also composed music for films. He was the assistant head of the Warner Brothers music department from 1932 to 1943, then worked as the assistant of the music department at MGM until 1945, when he moved to Eagle-Lion Films, where he worked until 1949. He joined ASCAP in 1955, and founded the Primrose Music Company, which produced both music and sound effects. He composed music for television, as well, including for the television series Father Knows Best (1954–1960) and Window on Main Street (1961–1962).
