= Alberta Number One =

- Directed by: Alexander Carson
- Written by: Alexander Carson
- Produced by: Kyle Thomas; Alexander Carson; Sara Corry
- Starring: Liz Peterson; Bebe Buckskin; Kris Demeanor; Benjamin Carson; Randall Okita; Ingrid Vargas
- Cinematography: David Ehrenreich
- Edited by: Noel Pendawa
- Music by: Joseph Murray; Brodie West
- Production company: North Country Cinema
- Distributed by: Game Theory Films
- Release date: October 16, 2024 (FNC)
- Running time: 83 minutes
- Country: Canada
- Language: English

Alberta Number One is a Canadian dramatic film, directed by Alexander Carson and released in 2024. The film centres on a documentary film crew who experience interpersonal tensions while travelling around Alberta to film the province's roadside attractions for an "Untitled Museum Project".

The cast includes Liz Peterson, Bebe Buckskin, Kris Demeanor, Benjamin Carson, Randall Okita and Ingrid Vargas.

The film premiered on October 16, 2024, in the national competition at the 2024 Festival du nouveau cinéma, and was screened the following week at the 60th Chicago International Film Festival. Game Theory Films subsequently acquired the film for commercial distribution in November 2025.
