= Nightmare in Wax =

1969 film by Bud Townsend

- Directed by: Bud Townsend
- Written by: Rex Carlton
- Produced by: Martin B. Cohen; Herbert Sussan
- Starring: Cameron Mitchell; Anne Helm; Scott Brady
- Cinematography: Glenn Smith
- Edited by: Leonard Kwit
- Music by: Igo Kantor
- Distributed by: Avatar Communications; Crown International Pictures
- Release date: May 14, 1969
- Running time: 91 minutes
- Country: United States
- Language: English

Nightmare in Wax (also known as Monster of the Wax Museum and Crimes in the Wax Museum) is a 1969 American horror film directed by Bud Townsend and starring Cameron Mitchell, Anne Helm and Scott Brady. It was written by Rex Carlton. A former film artist, when disfigured, becomes a recluse and opens a horrific wax museum.

== Plot ==
Former Hollywood make-up artist Vincent Renard has liquor thrown in his face while lighting a cigarette during a party. Despite diving into the pool half his face is disfigured. As a result he becomes recluse and opens a wax museum. As film stars disappear, new figures appear in his museum. Based on the theory of a Doctor Zerkai, Renard uses truth serum and a compound called "nerving" to put a person into suspended animation, and then installs them in his museum. But the formula has one flaw – its influence is dampened by electricity (including electrical storms). As he is about to turn his latest victim, his ex-boss Max Black, into one of his museum pieces, the police close in. Black laughs and an enraged Renard lunges forward and falls into the pool of molten wax. He is surrounded by people laughing at him, and then a ringing phone wakes him up. Answering it, he is reminded of the party, and not to be late.

== Cast ==
- Cameron Mitchell as Vincent Renard
- Anne Helm as Marie Morgan
- Scott Brady as Detective Haskell
- Berry Kroeger as Max Black
- Johnny Cardos as Sergeant Carver
- Victoria Carroll as Theresa
- Kent Osborne as Bartender

== Reception ==
The Monthly Film Bulletin wrote: "Although Vince's tableau of live 'waxworks' provides some splendid moments, particularly when the effects of the drug wear off and flickers of movement replace the previous immobility of the figures, there is a general note of near-desperation as to how the skeleton idea can be clothed to feature-length proportions. The result is a spun-out and sometimes turgid melodrama in which the macabre suspense never really clicks into place; but the climactic scenes build up effectively enough, even if the dénouement is a shade perfunctory."

Boxoffice wrote: "[This] is very much in the accepted mold and manner of the horror genre, certain to be accepted as engrossing entertainment by aficionados.. .. Anne Helm is the lithesome lovely once engaged to the ex-makeup man, and Victoria Carroll has some memorable moments as a go-go dancer. Filming, incidentally, was done in America's world-famous Movieland Wax Museum. The time-honored horror ingredients – vat of boiling wax, prototype for which is the ancient witches' cauldron, and the devil doll are all here in gruesome detail."

Kine Weekly wrote: "Wax museums are among the filmic dead certs for horror settings and this one comes up to normal expectations, with its dim lighting, eerie corners and laboratory full of sizzling retorts and vats of boiling wax ... Cameron Mitchell, his naturally rugged features made sinister by scar-tissue and an eye-patch, plays the mad villain with vigour and has hearty support from the remainder of the cast."
