= Samuel Miller (writer) =

American writer

Samuel Miller is an American novelist and screenwriter. He is most noted as co-writer with Cody Lightning of the 2023 film Hey, Viktor!, for which they received a Canadian Screen Award nomination for Best Original Screenplay at the 12th Canadian Screen Awards in 2024.

Originally from Vermillion, South Dakota, he has been a singer in the alternative rock band Paradise Fears. He subsequently moved to Los Angeles, California, to study film and television production at the University of Southern California.

He published his debut young adult novel A Lite Too Bright in 2018, and followed up with Redemption Prep in 2020. His third novel, Dark Parts of the Universe, is slated for publication in spring 2024.

As a filmmaker, he wrote and directed the short film Tensi prior to collaborating with Lightning on Hey, Viktor!, which premiered at the 2023 Tribeca Film Festival, and had its Canadian premiere at the 2023 Toronto International Film Festival, before going into commercial release in 2024.

He subsequently also cowrote the screenplay for Lightning's 2026 film Smudge the Blades.
