= Linton, Indiana =

- City
- "You'll Like Linton"

- Logo

- Location of Linton in Greene County, Indiana.
- Coordinates: 39°02′08″N 87°09′26″W
- Country: United States
- State: Indiana
- County: Greene
- Township: Stockton
- Established: 1850

Government
  - Mayor: John D. Preble (R)

Area
  - Total: 3.20 sq mi (8.29 km^{2})
  - Land: 3.20 sq mi (8.29 km^{2})
  - Water: 0 sq mi (0.00 km^{2})
- Elevation: 502 ft (153 m)

Population (2020)
  - Total: 5,133
  - Density: 1,603.6/sq mi (619.17/km^{2})
- Time zone: UTC-5 (EST)
  - Summer (DST): UTC-4 (EDT)
- ZIP code: 47441
- Area code: 812
- FIPS code: 18-44190
- GNIS feature ID: 2395726
- Website: www.cityoflinton.in.gov

Linton is a city in Stockton Township, Greene County, Indiana, United States. The population was 5,133 at the 2020 census. A coal mining city, it is located southeast of Terre Haute.

Linton is part of the Bloomington, Indiana, metropolitan area.

== History ==
Linton was essentially founded around the entrepreneuring of John W. Wines, who first sold goods in the Linton area, briefly in 1831. Although he would later relocate to Fairplay, Indiana, he returned and opened a general store in Linton in 1837. He would later build a small horse mill as well as a tannery. The city itself was officially chartered and named in June 1850, laid out by Hannah E. Osborn and Isaac V. Coddington. In the late 19th century, small underground coal mines began to appear near and almost inside the city and the population expanded rapidly. At the turn of the 20th century, the population was larger than it is today. At one point in the 1920s, there were at least 35 drinking establishments and an equal number of churches.

In 1896, Linton drove 300 African-American strikebreakers from town after one of them shot a white boy, after which it became a sundown town, prohibiting African-Americans from living there. In 1903, union miners drove black waiters from town, and the ban expanded to all of Greene County. Violence against African-Americans continued into the 1940s. Historian James W. Loewen cites Linton as an example of a town where strikebreakers were used as pretext for more general discriminatory practices.

In the 1920s, small surface mines began to predominate, and their small, unreclaimed hills and strip-pit lakes still surround the city. The lakes have provided a regular, if limited, amount of fishing tourism for decades. Signs of the underground mines remain as well, including tipples on private land and sinkholes that appear regularly on private property, roads and even within the city limits. By the 1940s, the underground mines were gone and the small surface mines had moved on or been consumed by large corporations such as Peabody Coal Company. These mines were the primary employers well into the 1980s.

On April 24, 1919, telephone operators at the New Home Telephone Company, all women, started a strike, demanding higher wages, shorter hours, and recognition of their union by the company. The next day, New Home brought in strikebreakers to continue telephone service for the town. The presence of strike breakers agitated Linton locals, the vast majority of whom were union members themselves. In protest, a general strike was called for all union workers in the town. As tensions rose, Linton Mayor Andrew Miller asked Indiana Governor James P. Goodrich to send in the Indiana National Guard and declare martial law. The presence of the National Guard heightened tensions even further, resulting in violence. The National Guard was ordered to fire upon citizens, but instead fired over the heads of the protestors and only minor injuries were sustained. The strike ended with New Home agreeing to raise wages and lower working hours but refusing to recognize the telephone operators' union.

In 1952, General Electric built a factory on the southeast side of the city. This factory employed several hundred until the mid-1980s, when GE phased out most of their small motors production in the U.S. The factory building remained empty due to Environmental Protection Agency regulations until GE tore it down beginning in 2014. The company plans to sell the land directly to buyers rather than to the city.

On April 29, 1963, an F3 tornado struck Hoosier, north of Linton. It was the strongest tornado ever recorded in Greene County.

The Linton Commercial Historic District and Linton Public Library are listed on the National Register of Historic Places.

== Geography ==
According to the 2010 census, Linton has a total area of 3.02 square miles (7.82 km^{2}), all land.

== Demographics ==
Historical population
Census	Pop.	Note	%±
1890	958		—
1900	3,071		220.6%
1910	5,906		92.3%
1920	5,856		−0.8%
1930	5,085		−13.2%
1940	6,263		23.2%
1950	5,973		−4.6%
1960	5,736		−4.0%
1970	5,450		−5.0%
1980	6,315		15.9%
1990	5,814		−7.9%
2000	5,774		−0.7%
2010	5,413		−6.3%
2020	5,133		−5.2%
U.S. Decennial Census

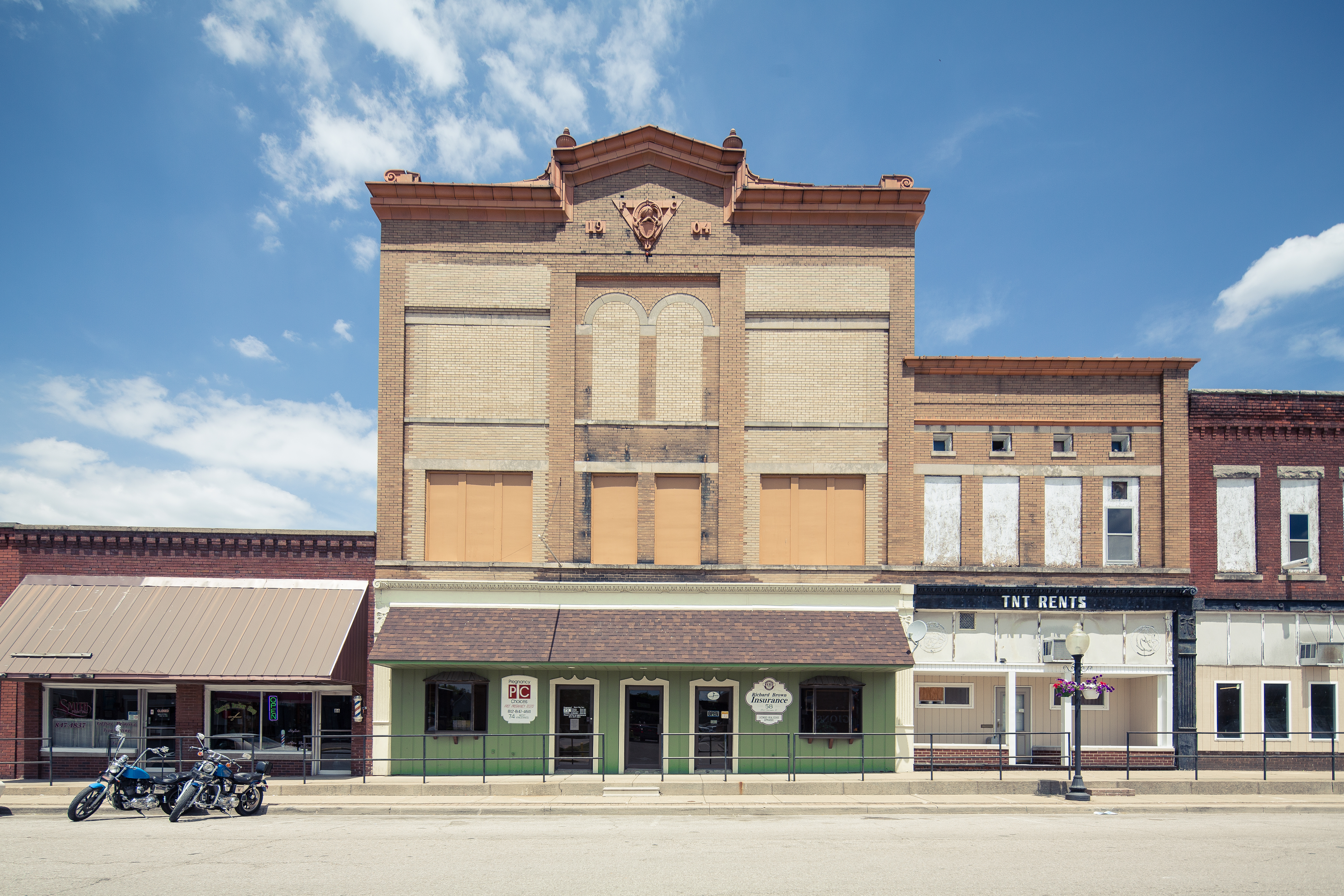
Buildings in Linton

=== 2020 census ===
As of the 2020 census, Linton had a population of 5,133. The median age was 41.9 years. 22.9% of residents were under the age of 18 and 22.1% of residents were 65 years of age or older. For every 100 females there were 90.1 males, and for every 100 females age 18 and over there were 88.4 males age 18 and over.

97.6% of residents lived in urban areas, while 2.4% lived in rural areas.

There were 2,321 households in Linton, of which 25.7% had children under the age of 18 living in them. Of all households, 38.9% were married-couple households, 20.1% were households with a male householder and no spouse or partner present, and 33.8% were households with a female householder and no spouse or partner present. About 37.4% of all households were made up of individuals and 19.4% had someone living alone who was 65 years of age or older.

There were 2,603 housing units, of which 10.8% were vacant. The homeowner vacancy rate was 1.4% and the rental vacancy rate was 11.6%.

Racial composition as of the 2020 census
Race	Number	Percent
White	4,841	94.3%
Black or African American	8	0.2%
American Indian and Alaska Native	9	0.2%
Asian	31	0.6%
Native Hawaiian and Other Pacific Islander	3	0.1%
Some other race	40	0.8%
Two or more races	201	3.9%
Hispanic or Latino (of any race)	133	2.6%

=== 2010 census ===
As of the census of 2010, there were 5,413 people, 2,325 households, and 1,443 families residing in the city. The population density was 1,792.4 inhabitants per square mile (692.0/km^{2}). There were 2,660 housing units at an average density of 880.8 per square mile (340.1/km^{2}). The racial makeup of the city was 97.7% White, 0.1% African American, 0.3% Native American, 0.4% Asian, 0.3% from other races, and 1.2% from two or more races. Hispanic or Latino of any race were 1.2% of the population.

There were 2,325 households, of which 29.6% had children under the age of 18 living with them, 44.0% were married couples living together, 12.5% had a female householder with no husband present, 5.6% had a male householder with no wife present, and 37.9% were non-families. 33.8% of all households were made up of individuals, and 16.7% had someone living alone who was 65 years of age or older. The average household size was 2.30 and the average family size was 2.88.

The median age in the city was 39.8 years. 23.4% of residents were under the age of 18; 8.4% were between the ages of 18 and 24; 23.9% were from 25 to 44; 25.1% were from 45 to 64; and 19.2% were 65 years of age or older. The gender makeup of the city was 47.7% male and 52.3% female.

=== 2000 census ===
As of the census of 2000, there were 5,774 people, 2,450 households, and 1,526 families residing in the city. The population density was 1,949.7 inhabitants per square mile (752.8/km^{2}). There were 2,792 housing units at an average density of 942.8 per square mile (364.0/km^{2}). The racial makeup of the city was 98.30% White, 0.09% African American, 0.24% Native American, 0.24% Asian, 0.02% Pacific Islander, 0.24% from other races, and 0.87% from two or more races. Hispanic or Latino of any race were 1.25% of the population.

There were 2,450 households, out of which 28.1% had children under the age of 18 living with them, 48.7% were married couples living together, 10.0% had a female householder with no husband present, and 37.7% were non-families. 34.5% of all households were made up of individuals, and 18.6% had someone living alone who was 65 years of age or older. The average household size was 2.26 and the average family size was 2.87.

In the city, the population was spread out, with 22.7% under the age of 18, 7.7% from 18 to 24, 25.3% from 25 to 44, 22.1% from 45 to 64, and 22.3% who were 65 years of age or older. The median age was 41 years. For every 100 females, there were 87.0 males. For every 100 females age 18 and over, there were 82.3 males.

The median income for a household in the city was $26,477, and the median income for a family was $36,138. Males had a median income of $32,213 versus $17,304 for females. The per capita income for the city was $15,554. About 8.2% of families and 12.3% of the population were below the poverty line, including 16.5% of those under age 18 and 12.8% of those age 65 or over.

== Arts and culture ==
=== Linton Music Festival ===
The tagline for the Linton Music Festival was "Mayberry meets Woodstock." In 2010, over 12,000 people attended. The festival prided itself in being a free event that offered entertainment for all ages and musical tastes. The festival operated as a non-profit entity that strived to promote the musical arts, economic development, and tourism. It was funded in part by grants from the Indiana Arts Commission and corporate sponsors. The Linton Music Festival (LMF) was held annually on the Friday, Saturday, and Sunday prior to Labor Day from 2005 to 2013 and featured 3 days of music.

=== Carnegie Heritage and Arts Center of Greene County ===
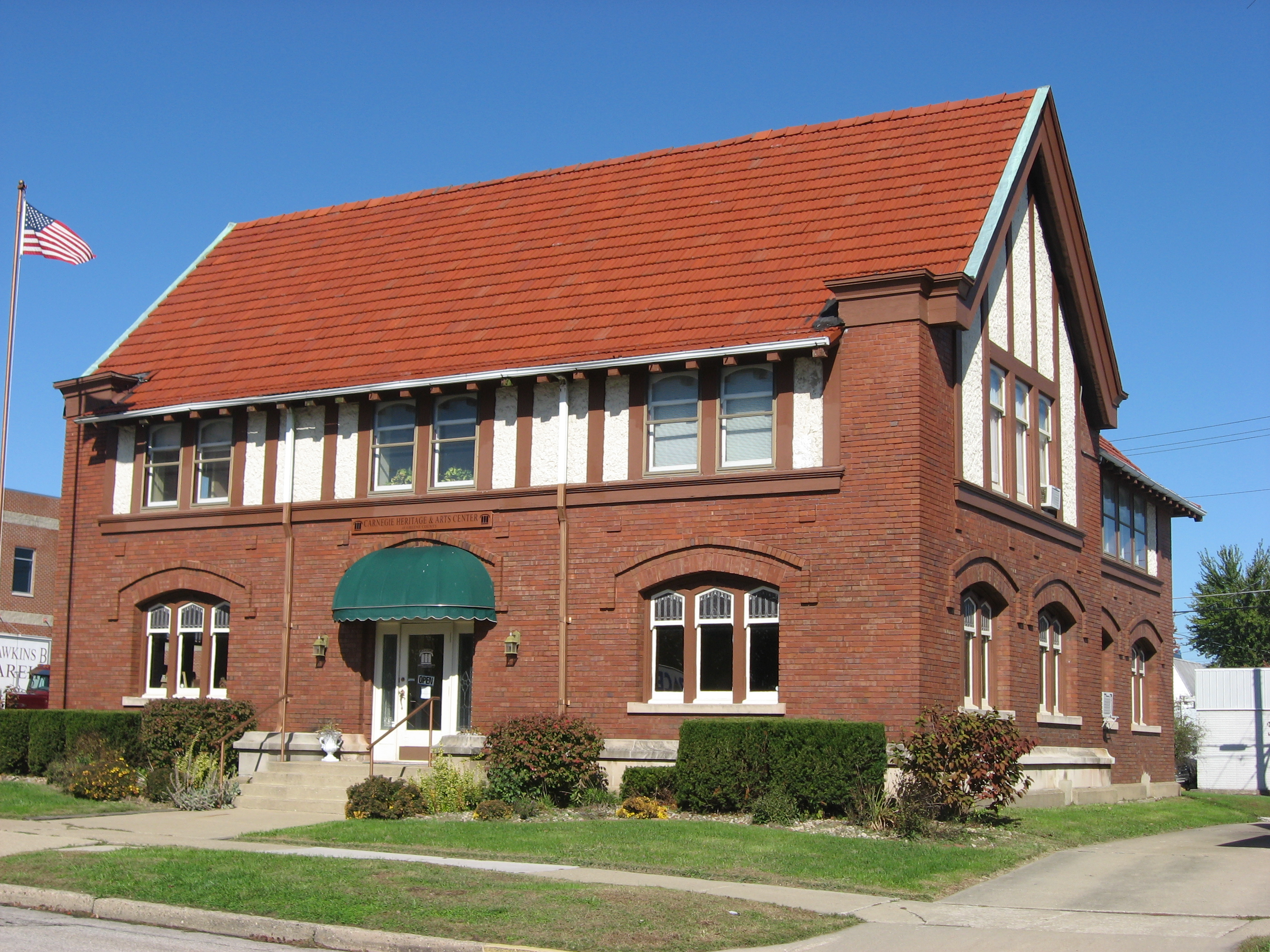
Carnegie Library

The Carnegie Heritage and Arts Center of Greene County is responsible for preserving and maintaining the historic 1908 Margaret Cooper Public Library building (a Carnegie library), which also houses the city's Phil Harris and Alice Faye memorabilia collection.

=== Freedom Festival ===
Linton has been celebrating Independence Day since 1905. Events include the largest and longest Independence Day parade in Indiana, bringing over 40,000 people to Linton, with a route several miles long that takes approximately two hours to complete, a week-long visit from a traveling carnival, local music and entertainment, and fireworks on the Fourth of July.

=== Marsh Madness ===
This festival, beginning in 2010, celebrates the wildlife contained in the Goose Pond Fish and Wildlife Area. Goose Pond is a wetlands reclamation project south of the city, which has had some success at restoring marginal farmland to its natural condition. The goal is to encourage hunting, fishing and naturalist excursions.

== Notable people ==
- Chuck Bennett, football player and coach.
- Gene Porter Bridwell, seventh Director of the NASA Marshall Space Flight Center.
- David Butler, first governor of Nebraska.
- Izzy Friedman, musician, composer.
- Phil Harris, musician, actor, and comedian.
- Orville Lynn Majors, nurse and serial killer
- Dorothy Mengering, mother of David Letterman.
- Elmer Oliphant, football player.
- Spencer Pope, football player.
- Don Veller, football player, football and golf coach, Born in Linton.

== In popular culture ==
Linton is one of the teams that plays against Hickory High in the motion picture Hoosiers.

== See also ==
- List of sundown towns in the United States
