= Mary Adams (actress) =

American actress

- Publicity Photo of Mary Adams
- Born: June 27, 1910
- Died: November 30, 1973 (aged 63)

Mary Marguerite Adams also known as June Mary Adams (1910–1973) was an American actress. She is best known as a television character actor from the 1950s. She was a regular, usually cast as a dowdy nurse or wife, and is best remembered as the day nurse in The Twilight Zone: "Twenty Two".

== Life ==
She was born on June 27, 1910, in Ogden, Utah.

She began acting late in life (38) but was a popular choice in supporting roles throughout the 1950s to the degree that she could be called a "familiar face". Her career faded in the early 1960s.

She died on November 30, 1973, in Los Angeles. She is buried in Kensico Cemetery in Valhalla, New York.

== Career ==
=== Television ===
- Stars Over Hollywood: "The Ageless" (1951)
- The George Burns and Gracie Allen Show (195 1/2)
- Craig Kennedy, Criminologist (three episodes, 1952) various roles
- Life With Father (pilot episode 1953)
- I Led 3 Lives (1953) as Mrs Ives
- Big Town (1955)
- The Father Who Had No Sons (TV movie, 1955)
- Front Row Center (1955) as Miss Jenny
- Medic (two episodes, 1955) as Sister Benedict
- Captain Midnight (1955) as Mrs Harper
- Matinee Theatre: "Statute of Limitations" (1956) as Mom
- Gunsmoke (1956) as Nettie
- The Adventures of Rin Tin Tin (1956) as Mrs Mack
- Crusader (1956) as Vera Nelson
- Sergeant Preston of the Yukon (1956) as Alice Burns
- Father Knows Best (2 episodes 1956)
- Lux Video Theatre (4 episodes, 1955–1957)
- The O. Henry Playhouse: "Christmas By Injunction" (1957)
- Have Gun - Will Travel (1957) as Maggie
- Decision: "Man on a Raft" (1958) as Sara Radford
- The Donna Reed Show (1958) as nurse
- M Squad (2 episodes 1958–59)
- Playhouse 90 (1959) as Mrs Haywood
- Adventure Showcase: "Doctor Mike" (1959) as Mary Barker
- Hawaiian Eye (1959) as Esther
- Riverboat (1959) as Mrs Wilkins
- Dennis the Menace (1960) as Helen Forbes
- The Twilight Zone: "Twenty Two" (1961) as nurse
- The Loretta Young Show (two episodes 1959–61) as mother
- Wagon Train (1961) as Julia
- Whispering Smith (1961) as Mrs Landers
- Window on Main Street (5 episodes, 1961) as Lavinia Webster
- It's a Man's World (1962) as Mrs Meredith
- The Untouchables (1962) as Kate Brannon
- The Alfred Hitchcock Hour (1963) (Season 1 Episode 23: "The Lonely Hours") as Nurse
- My Three Sons (2 episodes, 1961 and 1964)
- The File on Devlin (1969) as the maid

=== Film ===
- Hazard (1948) as Matron Sergeant
- Night Has a Thousand Eyes (1948) as Miss Hendricks
- For the Love of Mary (1948) as Marge
- Starlift (1951) as Sue Wayne (uncredited)
- Bugles in the Afternoon (1952) (uncredited)
- Executive Suite (1954) as Sara Asenith Grimm
- Her Twelve Men (1954) as Martha the school nurse (uncredited)
- Rebel in Town (1956) as Grandma Ackstadt
- Blood of Dracula a.k.a. Blood is My Heritage (1957) as Mrs Thorndyke
- Diary of a Madman (1963) as Louise the Cook (with Vincent Price)
- The Day They Gave Babies Away (1957) as Mrs Roscoe (uncredited)
- The Clown and the Kid (1961) as Mother Superior (uncredited)
- Doctors' Wives (1971) as nurse (uncredited)
