= Dorothy Mengering =

Mother of David Letterman (1921–2017)

- Born: Dorothy Marie Hofert; July 18, 1921; Linton, Indiana, U.S.
- Died: April 11, 2017 (aged 95); Carmel, Indiana, U.S.
- Education: Indiana University Bloomington
- Occupation: Television personality
- Television: Late Night with David Letterman; Late Show with David Letterman
- Spouses: Harry Letterman (m. 1942; died 1973) Hans Mengering (m. 1983; died 2013)
- Children: 3; including David Letterman

Dorothy Marie Mengering (née Hofert, formerly Letterman; July 18, 1921 – April 11, 2017), better known to Late Night and Late Show viewers as Dave's Mom, was the mother of late-night talk show host David Letterman and frequent telephone and live guest on his show.

She appeared on camera (identified as Dorothy Mengering) on Late Night with David Letterman on the "Parents' Night" broadcast of February 25, 1986, in which the parents of many Late Night staffers were also seen. Following several years of appearing via telephone, Mengering (usually billed as "Dave's Mom" or "Dave's Mom Dorothy", with no mention of her surname) became a recurring on-camera guest on Letterman's subsequent Late Show, initially by covering the 1994 Winter Olympics in Lillehammer, Norway. She lived in Carmel, Indiana, at the time of her death.

== Personal life ==
Dorothy Mengering was born Dorothy Marie Hofert in Linton, Indiana, the oldest child of Lena M. (née Strietelmeier) and Earl Jacob Hofert. Mengering's maternal grandparents, Fredricke Hilgediek and William Strietelmeier, were born in Germany, and her father was of German descent. She also had a younger brother, Earl Jr. (1922–2009), and a sister, Hazel (1923–2017) who died at age 93, less than three months after Mengering. Dorothy's first cousin was the grandmother of the model and actress Rebecca Romijn, a fact which was discussed on the Late Show with David Letterman.

Mengering spent a year at Indiana University before marrying Harry Joseph (Joe) Letterman in 1942, with whom she had three children: Jan, David, and Gretchen. While raising her children, she assisted her husband, a florist, and worked as a secretary at her church, Second Presbyterian. She was predeceased by her husband in 1973. In 1983, she remarried, this time to Hans Mengering, a retired engineer and decorated World War II veteran who died on March 12, 2013.

== Appearances on Late Night ==
Mengering made her first (and only) in-person appearance on Late Night as part of the "Parents' Day" broadcast of February 25, 1986. As part of the broadcast, Letterman cajoled her into yelling out the production office window with a bullhorn.

Beginning in June 1990, Letterman would occasionally call his mother at home during the show. Mengering, who always addressed her son as "David", would patiently answer her son's questions and generally play along with his suggestions—though some of Letterman's more deliberately nonsensical suggestions were kindly but firmly shut down. Letterman's phone calls would usually involve Mengering being asked to review a movie or a TV show, share a recipe, or recount a recent event in her life; on one occasion, she was asked to present a Top Ten list of things in her refrigerator.

== Appearances on The Late Show ==
=== Olympics ===
Mengering's first on-camera appearance on The Late Show was in 1994, when she provided nightly coverage of the 1994 Winter Olympics in Lillehammer. In the days immediately prior to her television debut, she fell and received eight stitches on her eyebrow and a black eye, and spent much of her on-camera time under many layers of makeup. While in Lillehammer, she interviewed Hillary Clinton (inquiring if her husband might be able to "fix" Dave's speeding tickets), Nancy Kerrigan (repeatedly asking her if she would like a cup of hot cocoa), and several other winter Olympians, including gold medal-winner Tommy Moe.

Mengering reprised her role as Late Show Olympic commentator in 1998 and 2002, covering the Winter Games held in Nagano, Japan and Salt Lake City, Utah.

=== Other appearances ===
After her first appearance in 1994, Mengering appeared on the show several times each year. She made annual appearances on Thanksgiving, via satellite from her Indiana home, for a feature entitled "Guess Mom's Pies". She also appeared regularly a few days before Mothers' Day and made occasional visits on her birthday. In 1995, she traveled to London to film remote spots for The Late Show, which were aired later that year.

== Death ==
In 2015, Mengering suffered a stroke, but recovered months later. Mengering died on April 11, 2017, of natural causes at her home in Carmel, Indiana, at the age of 95.

== Quotes ==
"The positive response to my appearances on David's show has nothing to do with my amateur abilities as a broadcaster. People enjoy seeing a mother and son together. It's that simple."
