= Anne Helm =

American actress and author (born 1938)

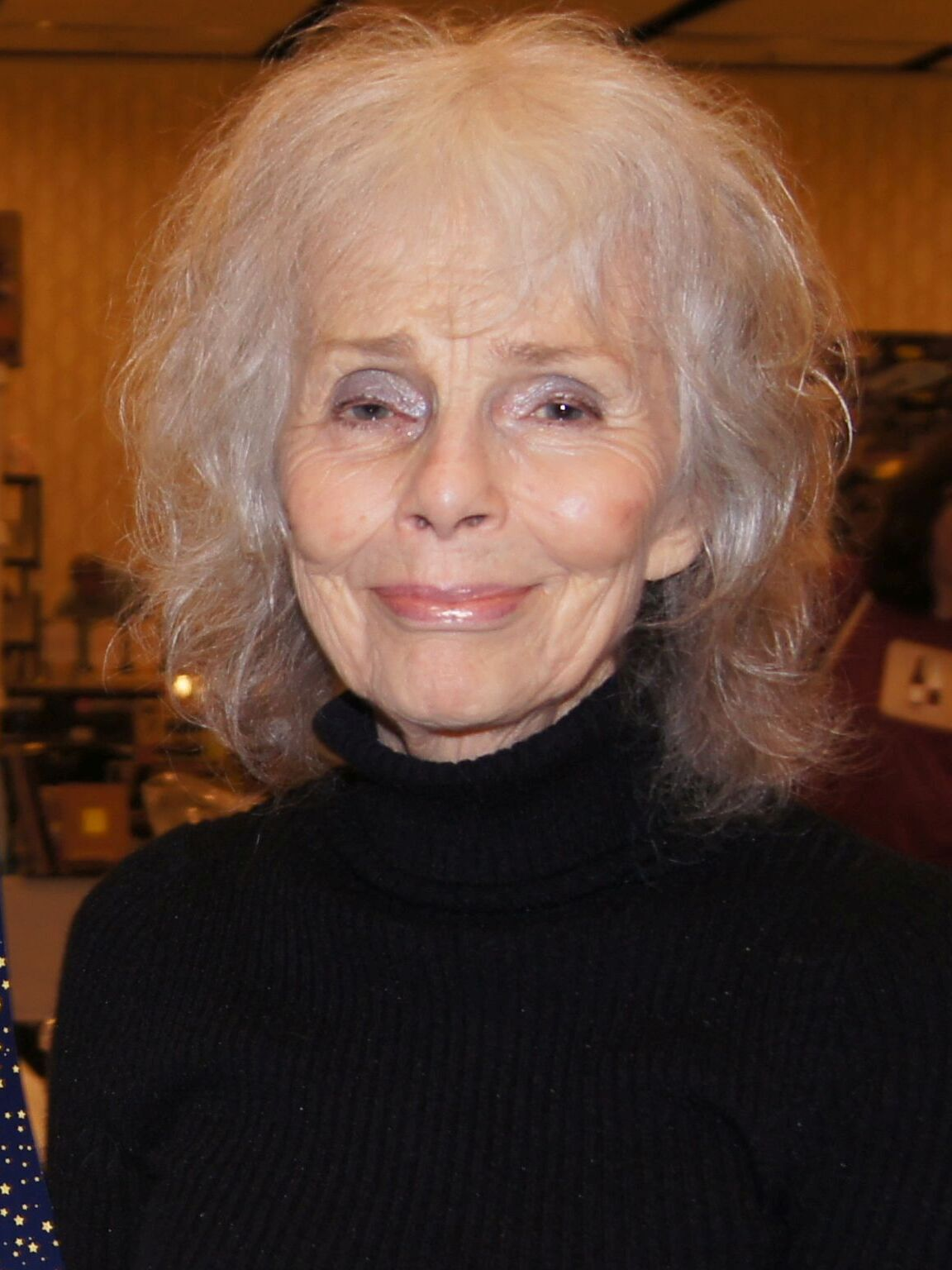
- Helm in 2019
- Born: September 12, 1938 (age 87); Toronto, Ontario, Canada
- Other name: Annie Helm
- Occupations: Actress; author
- Years active: 1941–1986
- Known for: Follow That Dream; The Interns
- Spouses: John Sherlock (m. 1968; div. 1969) Robert Viharo (m. 1971; div. 1979)
- Children: 2
- Family: Peter Helm (brother); Tiffany Helm (niece)

Anne Helm (born September 12, 1938) is a retired Canadian-born actress and children's author (as Annie Helm), who primarily appeared in guest roles on episodes of various American television series. Her few film roles include playing Elvis Presley's love interest in the 1962 film Follow That Dream. Helm had two recurring roles, playing Molly Pierce in five episodes during the 85-episode run of the mid-1960s series Run for Your Life and playing the minor role of nurse Mary Briggs in an unknown number of episodes of the daily soap opera General Hospital from 1971 to 1973.

== Early years ==
Helm began studying ballet with the National Ballet Guild of Canada when she was 12, and at 14 she studied at the Metropolitan Opera Ballet School.

== Career ==
Helm began performing on Broadway in the 1940s as she danced in High Kickers (1941), Lady in the Dark (1943), and Mexican Hayride (1944). She returned as an actress, portraying Sally Reece in Cloud 7 (1958) and Edwina Booth in Edwin Booth (1958). During the 1950s, she modeled clothing for teenage girls in New York, made commercials and danced at the Copacabana night club.

Living in New York City, Helm began her pursuit of an acting career, which eventually led to Hollywood. Beginning in the 1950s, she made guest appearances on television series. Her television debut occurred on The Phil Silvers Show in the role of a contestant in a beauty pageant. Her 1958 title role in Shirley Temple's Storybook's presentation of "The Sleeping Beauty" was the subject of an article in Life magazine. She made her motion picture debut in 1960.

Helm was cast as Linda Moon in the 1960 episode "A Thief or Two" on CBS's anthology series, The DuPont Show with June Allyson, with co-star Lew Ayres. She appeared on the CBS Western series Rawhide in the episodes "Incident Near Gloomy River (1961) and "Inside Man" (1962). She guest-starred in an episode of the CBS sitcom My Sister Eileen, with Elaine Stritch and Shirley Bonne.

In 1961, Helm appeared in "The Changing Heart" and, in 1962, "The Big Kick", both episodes of Alfred Hitchcock Presents (season 6, episode 14, and season 7 episode 37). In 1961 she also guest-starred in the premiere episode of ABC's Bus Stop drama series. That same year, she appeared in the first season of CBS's Route 66 in the episode "The Clover Throne", and in the syndicated crime drama The Brothers Brannagan in the episode "Equinox." She also played Glamis Barlow, the title character, in the Perry Mason TV episode, "The Case of the Duplicate Daughter." In Dec 1961 she appeared as a drug addicted gun moll in The Untouchables episode 3–8, "Mankiller". Helm was cast as Jennie Metcalf, the daughter of an outlaw who seeks vengeance for her father's death, in the 1962 episode "Girl with a Gun", on the syndicated anthology series, Death Valley Days.

Helm drew national recognition as Holly Jones, the love interest of Elvis Presley in his 1962 film Follow That Dream. She made five more films during the 1960s including The Iron Maiden (released in the US as Swinging Maiden), a 1962 British made comedy film, The Interns (1962), Honeymoon Hotel (1964), The Unkissed Bride (1966), and the horror film Nightmare in Wax (1969).

Helm played different roles in three appearances on Wagon Train, an American Western series. The first episode Helm was on was entitled "The Dick Pederson Story" (10 Jan. 1962); the second episode was entitled "Heather and Hamish" (10 Apr. 1963) and the third was "The Story of Cain" (16 Dec. 1963).

On January 15, 1963, Helm guest-starred in the episode "Protective Custody" of NBC's Western series, Laramie. David Brian played Walt Douglas, an official of the stage line, who arrives in Laramie seeking his estranged daughter, Alicia, portrayed by Helm.

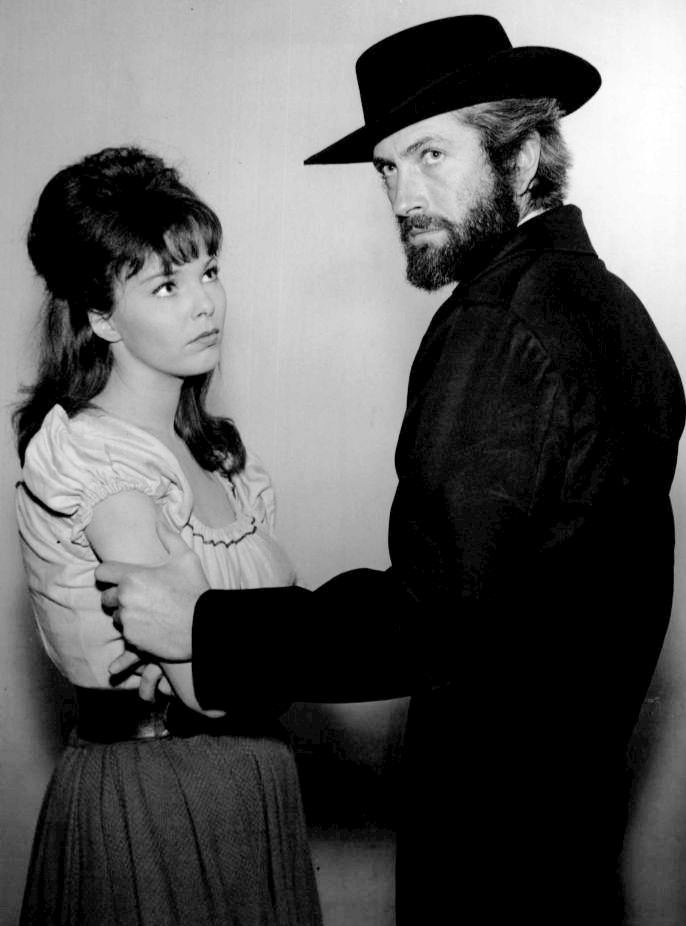
Helm and John Drew Barrymore in a 1964 episode of CBS's Gunsmoke

In the Gunsmoke TV Series she played "Helena Dales" in "One Killer on Ice", and "Trudy Trent" in "Bad Seed".

Later in 1963, she was cast as Joanie in the series finale, "The Convention," of the modern Western series, Empire.

In 1963 she also guest-starred as Janie in Season-three of CBS's TV series Route 66 in the episode: "Narcissus On An Old Red Fire Engine".

Helm appeared in The Magic Sword (1962) opposite Basil Rathbone and Gary Lockwood. She was originally cast to play Joan Crawford's daughter Carol in William Castle's Strait-Jacket (1964) but was replaced.

Helm appeared as Nora Martin in a 1964 episode of The Fugitive titled "Ballad for a Ghost", and again in a 1964 episode of 'Burke's Law' - 'Who Killed 1/2 Of Glory Lee?' - as Sable Delacroix.

Helm had the role of Amy in the ABC drama The Long, Hot Summer (1965-1966). She also appeared in two episodes of the ABC Western series The Big Valley, both times in a role that interacted prominently with main cast member Lee Majors. Her first appearance was on October 20, 1965, in the first-season episode "Heritage" in the role of Brydie Hanrahan. Helm then returned on March 4, 1968, in the third season in the episode entitled "The Devil's Masquerade," playing the role of Nancy.

In 1967 she appeared as Jeanne Springer in Season 3 Episode 16 "Long Time Dead" of Twelve O'Clock High.

Helms' appearance on The F.B.I. in 1968 was her third on that series in three years. In 1968, Helm appeared as Irene Park in Season 1 of Hawaii Five-O.

In 1968 appeared in the chapter 32 of the season 9 as a teacher in the tv Series Bonanza. In 1969 she appeared as Karen Mallory on the TV Series The Virginian in the episode titled "Journey to Scathelock."

From 1971 to 1973, Helm was a regular cast member on the ABC soap opera General Hospital.

In 1986, Helm appeared in the episode "The Doll", on Steven Spielberg's dramatic television anthology, Amazing Stories.

=== Author ===
After her acting career ended in 1986, Helm started writing children's books, as Annie Helm. Her book The Sunshine Angel Book for Angel Workers of All Ages was published in 1992, followed in 1993 by The Little Angel Workbook for Children of all Ages. Fifteen years later, in 2018, her book Babystar was published.

== Personal life ==
Helm was married from 1968 to 1969 to author John Sherlock, with whom she had a son. Her second husband was actor Robert Viharo, whom she wed in 1971 and had a daughter. Helm and Viharo divorced in 1979. Her former sister-in-law is actress Brooke Bundy who had a daughter, Tiffany Helm, that went on to become an actress like her mother.

== Select filmography ==
Year	Title	Role	Notes
1960	Tales of Wells Fargo	Nell	Season 5 Episode 9: "The Killing of Johnny Lash"
1960	The Outlaws	Blanche Chante	Season 1 Episode 3: "Beat the Drum Slowly"
1960	Sea Hunt	Caroline Tucker	Season 3 Episode 29: "Storm Drain"
1961	Alfred Hitchcock Presents	Lisa Klemm	Season 6 Episode 14: "The Changing Heart"
1961	Bus Stop	Shirley	Season 1 Episode 1: "Afternoon of a Cowboy"
1961	Route 66	Sweet Thing	Season 1 Episode 15: "The Clover Throne"
1961	Rawhide	Flora Travis	Season 3 Episode 19: "Incident Near Gloomy River"
1961	Rawhide	Sheila Brewester	Season 4 Episode 6: "The Inside Man"
1961	Gunsmoke	Trudy	Season 6 Episode 21: "Bad Seed"
1961	Perry Mason	Glamis Barlow	Season 4 Episode 26: "The Case of the Duplicate Daughter"
1962	Alfred Hitchcock Presents	Judy	Season 7 Episode 37: "The Big Kick"
1962	Route 66	Lorre Martin	Season 2 Episode 32: "From an Enchantress Fleeing"
1962	The Iron Maiden (US: The Swinging Maiden)	Kathy Fisher	
1962	Follow that Dream	Holly Jones	
1962	Wagon Train	Janey Cutler	Season 5 Episode 15: "The Dick Pederson Story"
1962	The Interns	Mildred	
1963	Route 66	Janie Nickerson	Season 3 Episode 24: "Narcissus on an Old Red Fire Engine"
1963	Laramie	Alicia Douglas / Leona	Season 4 Episode 15: "Protective Custody"
1963	The Lieutenant	Laurice Arnold	Season 1 Episode 13: "The Art of Discipline"
1963	Wagon Train	Heather MacIntosh	Season 6 Episode 29: "The Heather and Hamish Story"
1963	Wagon Train	Ruth Cain	Season 7 Episode 13: "The Story of Cain"
1965	Gunsmoke	Helena Dales	Season 10 Episode 18: "One Killer on Ice"
1965	The Big Valley	Brydie Hanrihan	Season 1 Episode 6: "Heritage"
1965	Bonanza	Meredith Smith / Callie Martin	Season 7 Episode 8: "The Meredith Smith"
1965	Daniel Boone (1964 TV series)	Sumah	Season 1 Episode 29: "The Courtship of Jericho Jones"
1967	The F.B.I.	Gloria Burnett	Season 2 Episode 28: "Force of Nature"
1968	The Big Valley	Nancy Briggs	Season 3 Episode 24: "The Devil's Masquerade"
1968	Bonanza	Abigail Pettigraw	Season 9 Episode 32: "Pride of a Man"
1968	The F.B.I.	Dorothy Phillips / Anita Hale	Season 3 Episode 23: "The Ninth Man"
1968	The F.B.I.	Karen Dryden	Season 4 Episode 11: "The Butcher"
1968	Hawaii Five-O	Irene Park	Season 1 Episode 9: "By the Numbers"
1969	Hawaii Five-O	Joyce	Season 2 Episode 4: "Just Lucky, I Guess"
1969	The F.B.I.	Amy Springer	Season 5 Episode 6: "Gamble with Death"
1969	Adam-12	Peg Tompkins	Season 1 Episode 20: "Log 73: I'm Still a Cop"
