= Goose Pond Fish and Wildlife Area =

Protected area in Indiana, United States

- IUCN category V (protected landscape/seascape)
- Location within Indiana Location within the United States
- Location: Greene County, Indiana
- Nearest city: Linton, IN
- Coordinates: 38°59′23″N 87°10′42″W
- Area: 9,098 acres (36.82 km^{2})
- Elevation: 1,604 ft (489 m)
- Established: 2005
- Governing body: Indiana Department of Natural Resources

The Goose Pond Fish and Wildlife Area is a 9,098-acre parcel of restored prairie and marsh habitat located in Greene County, Indiana, near Linton. The parkland is managed for hiking, birdwatching, waterfowl hunting, and upland bird hunting.

== Description ==
The Goose Pond Fish and Wildlife Area occupies a reclaimed area. Much of it was, in former times, the Paul Thompson wetland cattle ranch; parts of the area were surface-mined for coal. Since 2005, the parcel has been under the jurisdiction of the Indiana Department of Natural Resources, with 7,200 acres enrolled in the Wetland Reserve Program. Of this enrolled acreage, 5,000 acres are defined as shallow water wetlands, with water levels maintained by over 30 miles of landscaped levees. The Wildlife Area also includes 1,300 acres of reconstructed tallgrass prairie. With both water and upland dry parcels for habitat, the Wildlife Area has logged the sighting of more than 280 species of birds.

The Nature Conservancy, which helped sponsor creation of the Wildlife Area in 2005, encourages visitation. The parcel was further improved in 2016 by the construction of a headquarters office and Visitor Center, featuring a birders' observation deck and interpretive signage to enhance the birdwatching experience. Nearby trails offer opportunities for hiking, including ADA-compliant paved trails with more signage.
