= Linton Public Library =

- U.S. National Register of Historic Places
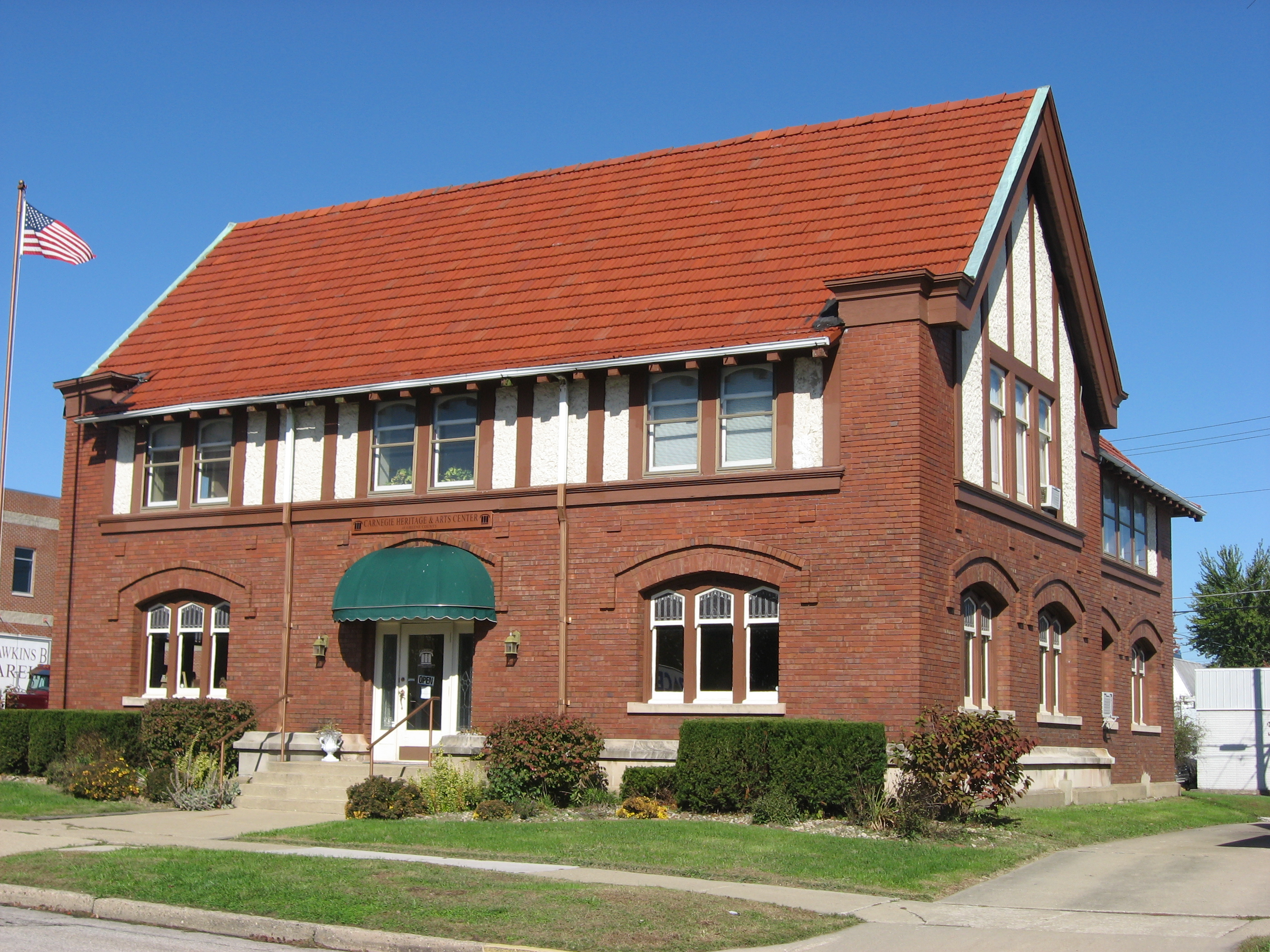
- Linton Public Library, October 2011

- Location within Indiana Location within the United States
- Location: 110 E. Vincennes St., Linton, Indiana
- Coordinates: 39°2′4″N 87°9′53″W
- Area: less than one acre
- Built: 1908
- Architect: Patton & Miller
- Architectural style: Bungalow/craftsman, Tudor Revival
- NRHP reference No.: 00001141
- Added to NRHP: September 22, 2000

Linton Public Library, also known as the Margaret Cooper Library, is a historic library building located at Linton, Indiana. It was designed by noted Chicago architecture firm Patton & Miller and built in 1908. It is a 2 1/2-story, "T"-plan, Tudor Revival style building with Arts and Crafts style design elements. It has a steeply pitched gable roof with French clay tile. The first story is of brick and upper story sheathed in stucco with half-timbering.

It was listed on the National Register of Historic Places in 2000.
