= Red Letter Day (film) =

- Red Letter Day Poster
- Directed by: Cameron Macgowan
- Screenplay by: Cameron Macgowan
- Produced by: R. Trevor Griffiths; Amy Griffiths; Cameron Macgowan; Rhett Miller
- Starring: Dawn Van de Schoot; Kaeleb Zain Gartner; Hailey Foss; Roger LeBlanc; Peter Strand Rumpel; Tiffany Helm; Arielle Rombough; Michael Tan
- Cinematography: Rhett Miller
- Edited by: Nina Staum
- Music by: Jono Grant
- Production companies: TANDA Productions, Awkward Silencio
- Distributed by: Epic Pictures Group
- Release date: March 2019 (Brussels International Fantastic Film Festival)
- Running time: 76 minutes
- Country: Canada
- Language: English

Red Letter Day is a Canadian satirical horror feature film, released in 2019. The film follows what happens in an isolated suburban community when the entire neighborhood receives red letters instructing them to kill one of their neighbors before their neighbor kills them. The film was released in North America by Epic Pictures Group under their DREAD label on Blu-ray and VOD in November 2019.

== Plot ==
The story of the film features a recently divorced mother and her two teenage children who, while adjusting to a new life in the suburban community of Aspen Ridge, receive mysterious letters instructing them to kill the people in their letters before they kill them. Paranoia and chaos ensue as the family attempts to rationally deal with the irrational situation.

== Reception ==
The film was a hit on the international genre film festival circuit with screenings at London FrightFest Film Festival, Screamfest Horror Film Festival, Fantaspoa, Brussels International Fantastic Film Festival, and more. The film received positive critical attention, including Screen Anarchy saying "It plays like a modern mash-up of David Cronenberg's Shivers (film) and Kinji Fukasaku's Battle Royale (film)." and renown English journalist Kim Newman saying "A terrific premise, ferociously well worked out, and an excellent performance from Dawn Van de Schoot as an unwilling tiger mommy.".
