= Kyle Thomas =

Canadian filmmaker

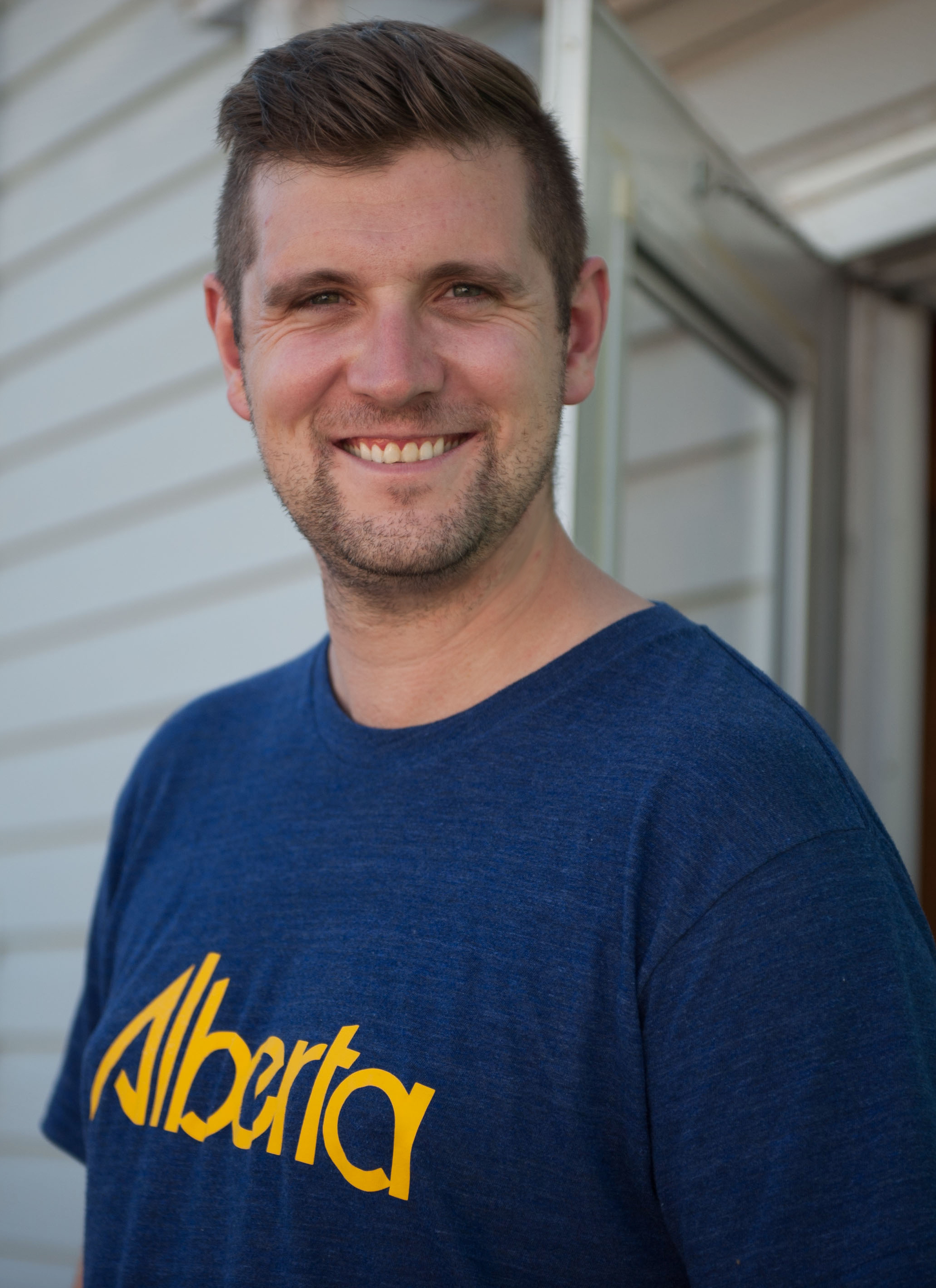
- Thomas in 2013
- Born: 23 June 1983 (age 43); Vancouver, British Columbia, Canada
- Education: Concordia University
- Occupations: Film director, screenwriter, producer, actor
- Years active: 2007–present
- Website: northcountrycinema.com

Kyle Thomas (born 23 June 1983) is a Canadian screenwriter, director, producer, and actor. His first feature film, The Valley Below, premiered at the Toronto International Film Festival in 2014. It garnered two Canadian Screen Award nominations in the categories of Best Supporting Actor for Kris Demeanor and Best Original Song for Dan Mangan's "Wants". The film received largely positive reviews from the Canadian media, including The Globe and Mail and the National Post, who called the film a "superb first feature".

== Early life and education ==
Thomas was born in Vancouver, British Columbia, and raised in Calgary, Alberta. He began making films with the Calgary Society of Independent Filmmakers in his teenage years before attending Concordia University's Mel Hoppenheim School of Cinema in Montreal in the early 2000s. After completing his BFA, he returned to Calgary to establish the North Country Cinema media arts collective in 2005.

== Career ==
=== Directing and producing ===
Thomas is a founding member of North Country Cinema, along with filmmakers Alexander Carson and Nicholas Martin, whom he met at the Mel Hoppenheim School of Cinema at Concordia University in Montreal, Quebec. Through North Country Cinema, Thomas has focused on producing director-driven film and video content, and has created award-winning works that have screened at major international festivals, including the Toronto International Film Festival and SXSW. Thomas' recent films have portrayed neo-realist narratives concerned with intimate, personal stories depicting life in rural Alberta. Following the announcement that his first feature film The Valley Below would be funded by Telefilm Canada, he was declared one of "10 Canadians to Watch at Cannes" in 2013.

The Valley Below premiered at the Toronto International Film Festival in 2014 and went on to garner two Canadian Screen Award nominations.

Thomas' second directorial feature, Range Roads, screened at Cinequest, The Canadian Film Festival and the Austin Film Festival in 2021 and was nominated for a Canadian Screen Award for Best Actress, Alana Hawley Purvis in 2022. The film is distributed by Game Theory in Canada and Freestyle Digital Media in the US. The film features original music by Eamon McGrath. The film won prizes for Best Feature and Best Director at the 2021 Rosie Awards.

Kyle Thomas was a lead producer on Hey Viktor! which screened at the Tribeca Film Festival and the Toronto International Film Festivals in 2023.

Thomas produced North Country Cinema's fourth feature, Alberta Number One (directed by Alexander Carson) which screened at Festival du nouveau cinéma in Montreal and the Chicago International Film Festival in fall 2024.

=== Acting work ===
Thomas plays the role of Danny in North Country Cinema's second feature film O, Brazen Age written and directed by Alexander Carson. The film premiered at the Vancouver International Film Festival in 2015.

== Filmography - as director ==
- 2007: Last Chance Saloon
- 2008: Ghost Town
- 2009: Liminal State of Decay
- 2011: Not Far from the Abattoir
- 2012: The Post
- 2014: The Valley Below
- 2021: Range Roads
- 2025: So Dark The Sky

== Filmography - as producer ==
- 2007: Last Chance Saloon
- 2008: Ghost Town
- 2009: Liminal State of Decay
- 2011: Not Far from the Abattoir
- 2012: The Post
- 2014: The Valley Below
- 2015: O, Brazen Age
- 2021: Range Roads
- 2023: Hey, Viktor!
- 2024: Alberta Number One
- 2025: So Dark The Sky
- 2026: Smudge the Blades
