= Mike McLaughlin (cinematographer) =

Canadian cinematographer

Mike McLaughlin is a Canadian cinematographer. He is most noted for his work on the films Unarmed Verses, for which he was a Canadian Screen Award nominee for Best Cinematography in a Documentary at the 6th Canadian Screen Awards in 2018, and Hands That Bind, for which he was a nominee for Best Cinematography at the 12th Canadian Screen Awards in 2024.

His other credits have included the films The Valley Below, The New Romantic, I'm Going to Break Your Heart, Hammer, Jesse Jams, The Kid Detective, Range Roads, Door Mouse, Alice, Darling and The King Tide.
