= The Role Call =

American rock band

- Origin: Minneapolis, Minnesota, United States
- Genres: Alternative rock, pop, pop rock
- Years active: 2012–2014
- Members: Steve Zerwas; Max Young; Joe Jorde; Kristoff Druva; Joey Russ
- Past members: Zach Hesemann
- Website: www.therolecall.com

The Role Call is an American pop/alternative rock band from Minneapolis, Minnesota. Since their birth in early 2012, they have written and recorded two EP's with producer Jordan Schmidt (All Time Low, Motion City Soundtrack, Sing It Loud). The band has created a following by promoting themselves at concerts across the entire country, as well as gaining a following by having multiple songs on MTV's reality television shows.

== History ==
Forming in early 2012, The Role Call was created by friends who had known each other from the local music scene in Minneapolis, Minnesota. They wrote and recorded their first EP with producers Jordan Schmidt (All Time Low, Motion City Soundtrack, Sing It Loud) and Pat Brown (Sing It Loud). This self-titled EP was released on May 29, 2012. In the summer of 2012 they set out on their first midwest tour with their friends in the band The Picture Perfect. After this tour, The Role Call continued building their fan base by following tours promoting. In addition to this, they started to release cover videos on YouTube including Owl City/Carly Rae Jepsen's song "Good Time". This cover has reached nearly 400,000 views since it has been released. After spending months out on the road touring, promoting and traveling thousands of miles, The Role Call went to Nashville, Tennessee to record their new EP with Jordan Schmidt (All Time Low, Motion City Soundtrack, Sing It Loud) again. They worked with Kevin Truckenmiller of Quietdrive to help write a couple of songs on this EP. They put out "Like I Do - EP" on June 4, 2013. The Role Call reached out to Sam Miller of Paradise Fears to do guest vocals on the song "Indestructible". After releasing this EP, The Role Call continued promoting on tours as well as by doing private house party tours. In 2013 they won the Ernie Ball Battle of the Bands which gave them a date on the Vans Warped Tour.

The Role Call has had many of their songs used in MTV's television shows such as, The Real World: Ex-plosion, Snooki & JWOWW, and more.

As of 2014, they have been writing new music as well as playing shows throughout the midwest. They have played shows with artists such as Quietdrive, Paradise Fears, Sing It Loud, and many more.

On April 27, 2014, The Role Call announced that they would be breaking up after playing one final show. Their last show was May 30 at The Garage in Burnsville, MN.

Joey Russ went on to play drums for Paradise Fears.

== Members ==
- Steve Zerwas – Vocals
- Max Young - Rhythm Guitar
- Joe Jorde - Lead Guitar
- Kristoff Druva - Bass Guitar
- Joey Russ - Drums
- Dove Cameron-singing

== Discography ==
List of Albums
Title	Album details
The Role Call - EP	Released: May 29, 2012
Like I Do - EP	Released: June 4, 2013

List of Singles
Title	Album details
Won't Get Down (feat. Pat Brown)	Released: April 9, 2012
She's All I Think About	Released: May 19, 2013
