= O, Brazen Age =

- Directed by: Alexander Carson
- Written by: Alexander Carson
- Produced by: Alexander Carson, Jeff Hanes, Kyle Thomas
- Cinematography: Mike McLaughlin
- Edited by: Alexander Carson
- Music by: Menalon
- Production companies: North Country Cinema, Walk On The Sunnyside
- Release date: September 27, 2015 (VIFF)
- Running time: 80 min.
- Country: Canada
- Language: English

O, Brazen Age is a Canadian dramatic film, completed in 2015. The feature-length debut by writer/director Alexander Carson, the film premiered at the 2015 Vancouver International Film Festival in September 2015.

The film weaves together a series of loosely connected stories and characters, chronicling the spiritual journey of a group of friends in West Toronto over the course of several months. Featuring an ensemble cast from different corners of the city's art-scene, O, Brazen Age creates a pageant of musings and monologues about photography, poetry, memory, and regret. On the occasion of the film's premiere in Vancouver, Pop Optiq called it "One of the best Canadian films of 2015".

Following the film's presentation at the Reykjavik International Film Festival in 2015, O, Brazen Age was programmed for a short theatrical release in Iceland at Bíó Paradís in 2016. O, Brazen Age was selected for numerous festival screenings in 2016 across North America and Europe, including the Leeds Independent Film Festival and the Victoria Film Festival.

O, Brazen Age was produced by the North Country Cinema media arts collective and Walk On The Sunnyside with the support of Telefilm Canada and the Canada Council for the Arts. The film was released theatrically in March 2017, garnering positive reviews from NOW Magazine and The Globe and Mail and earning praise from Canadian filmmakers Atom Egoyan and Guy Maddin.
