= Peter Helm =

Canadian-American film and television actor (1941–2026)

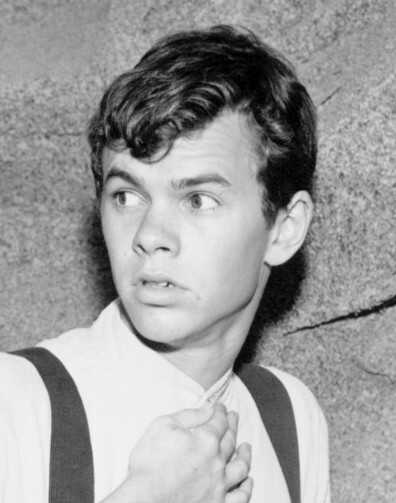
- Helm in Wagon Train, 1962
- Born: Peter John Helm Jr. December 22, 1941; Toronto, Ontario, Canada
- Died: May 21, 2026 (aged 84); Los Angeles, California, U.S.
- Occupations: Film and television actor
- Years active: 1959–1971
- Spouse: Brooke Bundy (m. 1962; div. 1966)
- Children: Tiffany Helm
- Family: Anne Helm (sister)

Peter John Helm Jr. (December 22, 1941 – May 21, 2026) was a Canadian-American film and television actor.

== Life and career ==
Helm was born in Toronto, Ontario, on December 22, 1941. He was the brother of Anne Helm, an actress. He began his screen career in 1959, appearing in the NBC television sitcom Too Young to Go Steady. In 1960, he appeared in the Broadway play There Was a Little Girl.

Later in his career, Helm guest-starred in television programs including Rawhide, The Farmer's Daughter, Ironside, Wagon Train, Mr. Novak, Tales of Wells Fargo, Naked City, The Donna Reed Show, Bonanza, Dr. Kildare, My Three Sons, Perry Mason, Kraft Suspense Theatre, and The Fugitive. In 1965, he starred as Milton Hopwood in the film Inside Daisy Clover, starring along with Natalie Wood, Christopher Plummer, Robert Redford, Ruth Gordon, Roddy McDowall and Katharine Bard. He also appeared in films such The Longest Day and The Andromeda Strain.

Helm retired from acting in 1971, last appearing in the ABC family drama television series The Smith Family.

== Death ==
Helm died in Los Angeles, California on May 21, 2026, at the age of 84.
