= Mel Hoppenheim School of Cinema =

Film school of Concordia University in Montreal, Canada

Coordinates: 45°29′40″N 73°34′39″W

- The Faubourg Building, which houses the MHSoC at Concordia University

Location
- 1250, rue Guy, FB 319 (Canada) Montreal, Quebec

Information
- Type: Public
- Established: 1976
- President: Mel Hoppenheim
- Faculty: ~ 40
- Enrollment: 203
- Campus: Urban
- Information: 514-848-2424 (ext. 5034)
- Website: Mel Hoppenheim School of Cinema

The Mel Hoppenheim School of Cinema, a division of the Faculty of Fine Arts at Concordia University, is a film school located in Montreal, Quebec. Informally known as MHSoC, the school accepts around 250 students a year for programs in animation, film production and film studies. It is the largest and oldest university-based centre for the study of film, television and media in Canada.

== History ==
The Mel Hoppenheim School of Cinema was originally established as Concordia's Department of Cinema within the Faculty of Fine Arts in 1976. Founding members included Professor Andre Herman, a graduate of the National Film School in Łódź and La Fémis, who remained with the school until his retirement in 2002, and Alfred Pinsky, the founding dean of the Faculty of Fine Arts, among others.

In 1997, Montreal-born filmmaker and entrepreneur Mel Hoppenheim donated $1 million to Concordia University, which was subsequently used to support students enrolled in the university's film programs. In recognition of his generous contribution, the Department of Cinema was renamed The Mel Hoppenheim School of Cinema in December 1997.

In the later half of the twentieth century, Hoppenheim and his partners have played significant roles in the development of Quebec's cinema and its film industry, such as the opening of numerous film studios throughout the province, as well as supporting the nearby Institut national de l'image et du son (INIS), a private French-language school for the development of writers, directors and producers for film and television.

== Facilities ==
Built in 1927, the Faubourg Building is home to the MHSoC and is located at the corner of Guy and Sainte-Catherine Street in Downtown Montreal. The building is also shared with the Classics, Modern Languages & Linguistics Department, the Continuing Education school, the Montreal Institute for Genocide and Human Rights Studies, and the District 3 Innovation Hub. The media facilities feature interactive teaching environments, shooting studios, professional screening rooms, Avid editing, Pro Tools sound editing, sound recording and mixing studios, sound archives, digital animation labs, and a full complement of digital and analog equipment. As students of Concordia University, MHSoC students also have access to other facilities and services available across campus.

== Departments ==
The school of cinema offers three areas of undergraduate study (major and minor): Film Animation, Film Production and Film and Moving Image Studies. At the graduate level, the school offers a M.F.A. in Film Production, and a M.A. and Ph.D. in Film and Moving Image Studies. A double major option in Art History and Film Studies is also offered jointly with the Art History Department. The school's programs are incorporated within the Faculty of Fine Arts, with each program primarily approaching the subject matter of cinema and media as a means of artistic expression. Consequently, a central aim of these programs is to prepare students to become filmmakers, film animators, historians, critics, or theorists who have a two-fold awareness: on the one hand, of the artistic and cultural potential of their medium and, on the other, of its history and traditions.

== Alumni ==
The work of graduates from The Mel Hoppenheim School of Cinema are often selected and dominate competitions, such as the Canadian Student Film Festival and the student section of the Cannes Film Festival. Alumni are active as producers, directors and technicians, including Academy Award, Prix Jutra, Canadian Screen Award and Emmy Award winners and nominees. Notable alumni include:

- Louise Archambault, director-screenwriter
- Jonathan Beaulieu-Cyr, director and screenwriter
- Glauco Bermudez, cinematographer
- Vincent Biron, cinematographer, director
- Gary Burns, director-screenwriter
- Alexander Carson, director-screenwriter-producer
- Miryam Charles, filmmaker
- Jérémy Compte, screenwriter-director
- Daniel Cross, director-producer
- François Dagenais, cinematographer
- Simran Dewan, cinematographer
- Vincent Gonneville, cinematographer
- Federico Hidalgo, screenwriter-director
- Meryam Joobeur, filmmaker
- Oksana Karpovych, filmmaker
- Alexandre Larose, filmmaker
- Juliette Lossky, cinematographer
- Jessica Lee Gagné, cinematographer, director
- Olivier Gossot, cinematographer
- Ivan Grbovic, director
- Oana Suteu Khintirian, editor-filmmaker
- Renaud Lessard, director and screenwriter
- Vincent René-Lortie, screenwriter-director
- Pascal Maeder, producer
- Sara Mishara, cinematographer
- Kim Nguyen, director-screenwriter-producer
- Alexandre Nour, cinematographer
- B. P. Paquette, director-screenwriter-producer, and academic
- Arto Paragamian, screenwriter-director
- Pascal Plante, director-screenwriter
- Dan Popa, filmmaker
- Chloé Robichaud, director-screenwriter
- Van Royko, cinematographer, director
- Chris Sandiford, actor and comedian
- Isabelle Stachtchenko, cinematographer
- Kyle Thomas, director-screenwriter-producer
- Vincent Toi, filmmaker
- André Turpin, cinematographer, and director-screenwriter
- Steven Woloshen, animator
