= Kris Demeanor =

Canadian poet, musician and actor

Kris Demeanor is a Canadian poet, musician and actor, who received a Canadian Screen Award nomination for Best Supporting Actor at the 3rd Canadian Screen Awards for his performance in the film The Valley Below.

Prior to his performance in the film, Demeanor worked primarily as a musician and poet, releasing six CDs and serving a term as poet laureate of Calgary, Alberta from 2012 to 2014. His song "I Have Seen the Future" formed the basis of Cam Christiansen's animated film of the same name, which was named to the Toronto International Film Festival's year-end Canada's Top Ten list in 2007.

In 2021 he appeared in Range Roads, the second film by The Valley Below director Kyle Thomas. In 2024 he appeared in Alexander Carson's mockumentary film Alberta Number One. Demeanor lives in Calgary with his partner, author Deborah Willis, and their daughter.

== Discography ==
- Kris Demeanor (1999)
- Lark (2001)
- Party All Night (2004)
- Go Away (With Me) (2007)
- The Guilt and the Shame: Tales of the Canadian West (2007)
- These United States (2009)
