= Alexander Carson (filmmaker) =

Canadian filmmaker

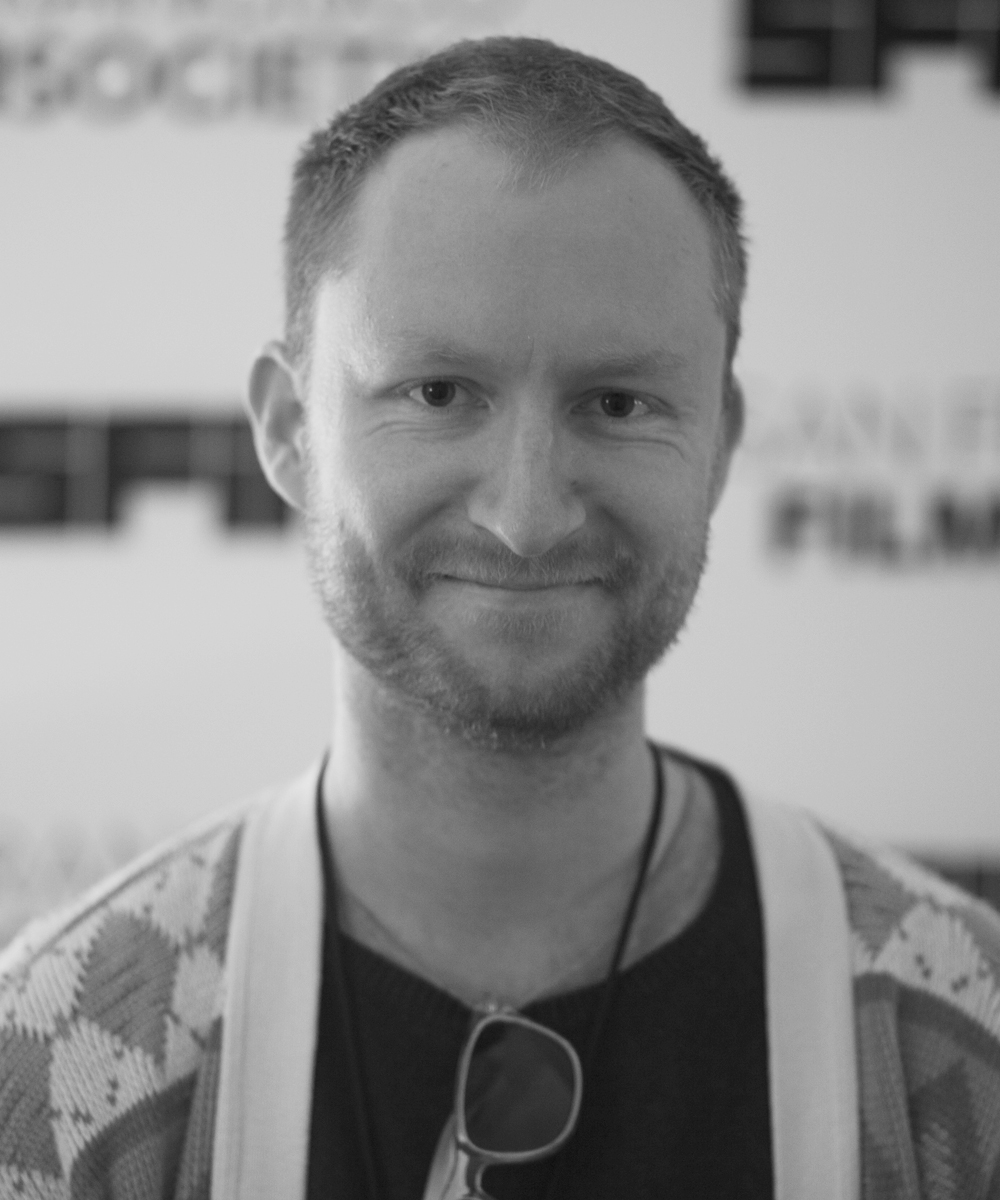
- Alexander Carson at the San Francisco International Film Festival in 2014
- Born: 16 July 1982 (age 44); Ottawa, Ontario
- Education: Concordia University
- Occupations: Film director, actor, screenwriter, film editor, film producer
- Years active: 2005–present
- Website: www.northcountrycinema.com

Alexander (Sandy) Carson is a Canadian filmmaker and media artist.

== Early life and education ==
Carson was born and raised in Ottawa, Ontario. He graduated from the Dramatic Arts program at Canterbury High School (Ottawa) before attending Concordia University's Mel Hoppenheim School of Cinema in Montreal, Quebec. Carson returned to Concordia for a master's degree in Film Studies and received the Lotte Eisner Award upon graduation.. He later completed his MFA in Creative Practice at Liverpool John Moores University via Transart Institute.

== Career ==
=== Directing and producing ===
Alexander Carson is a founding member of the North Country Cinema media arts collective, along with filmmakers Kyle Thomas and Nicholas Martin, colleagues whom he met at film school in Montreal.

Carson's films explore intersections of personal storytelling and collective practice. In 2012, he won the Award for Achievement in Direction from the Air Canada enRoute Film Festival for his film We Refuse To Be Cold. In 2013, his film Numbers & Friends had its World Premiere at the Toronto International Film Festival and in 2014, Carson received the Golden Gate Award for New Visions at the San Francisco International Film Festival. Later that year, Carson completed work on North Country Cinema's first feature film The Valley Below as a producer. Written and directed by longtime colleague and collaborator Kyle Thomas, the film premiered at the Toronto International Film Festival and went on to garner two Canadian Screen Award nominations in 2015.

Carson's first feature-length film as a writer/director, O, Brazen Age, premiered at the Vancouver International Film Festival in 2015. The film was subsequently selected for numerous other festivals in North America and Europe, including the Reykjavik International Film Festival.

He returned to VIFF in 2016 to premiere a short film, The New Canada. This film would be recognized with a Gold Bison Award at the Buffalo International Film Festival later that year. The New Canada was acquired by the Canadian Broadcasting Corporation in 2017.

Carson's second feature film, Alberta Number One, premiered in October 2024 in the national competition at the 2024 Festival du nouveau cinéma in Montreal, and screened at the 60th Chicago International Film Festival. Game Theory Films acquired the film for commercial distribution in the US and Canada in November 2025.

=== Acting ===
Carson often performs in his own films, and frequently cites his appreciation for the work of amateur actors or "non-actors" in cinema. Carson performed the role of Mr. Oddi in Sheila Heti's play All Our Happy Days Are Stupid directed by Jordan Tannahill. The show was first presented at Videofag in 2013, before a larger remount at the Harbourfront Centre in Toronto and at The Kitchen in New York City in 2015. Carson was nominated for a Dora Mavor Moore Award in 2014 as part of the show's ensemble cast.

== Filmography (as writer/director) ==
- 2005: Built Like Light
- 2008: Lucy James part 1
- 2009: Last Communication With Laura
- 2011: "We Refuse To Be Cold"
- 2012: Braids
- 2013: Numbers & Friends
- 2015: O, Brazen Age
- 2016: The New Canada
- 2024: Alberta Number One
