= Gene Porter Bridwell =

Marshall Space Flight Center Director (1935–2016)

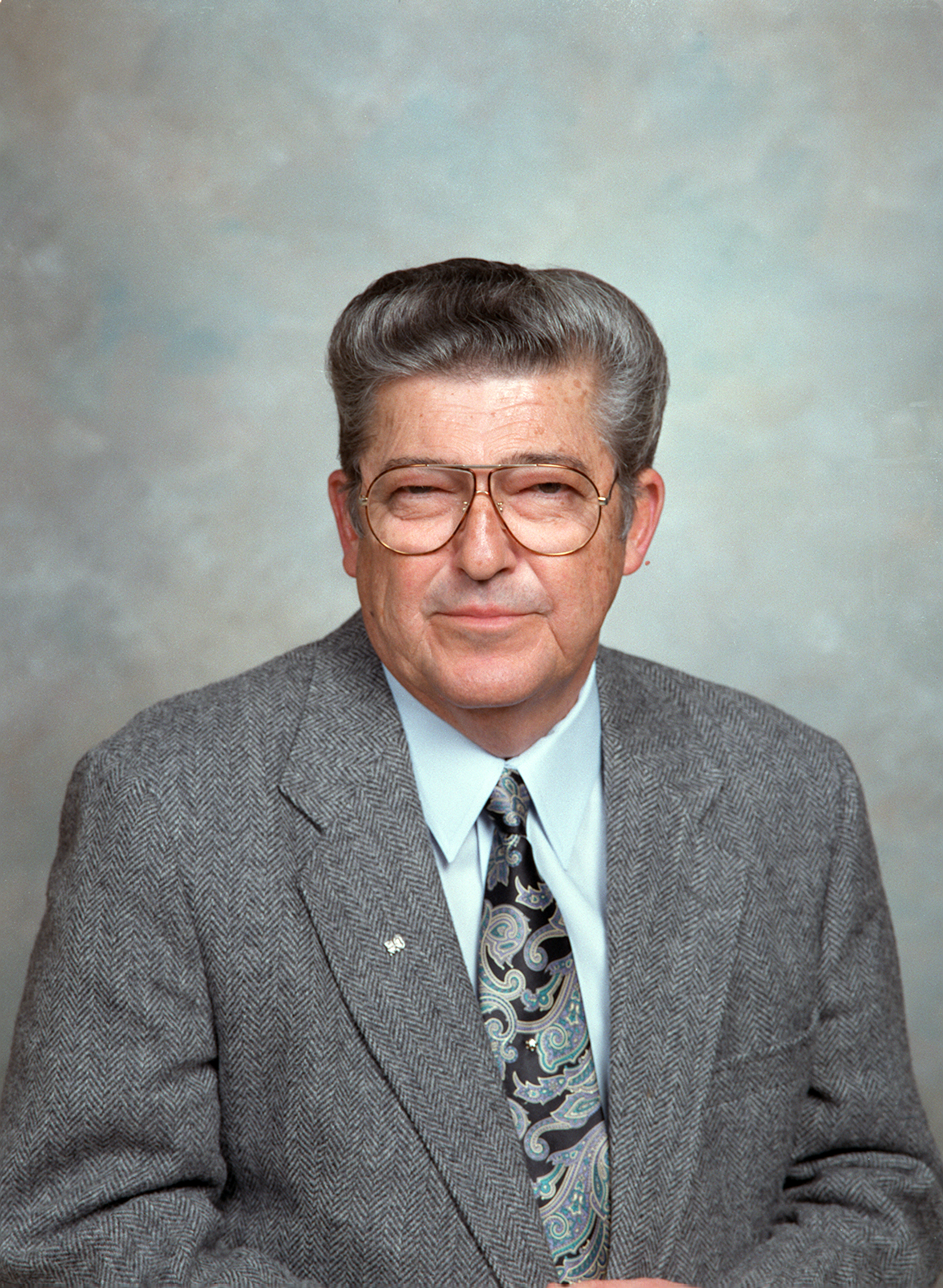
- Official NASA portrait of Gene Porter Bridwell
- Born: October 4, 1935; Linton, Indiana, U.S.
- Died: August 4, 2016 (aged 80); Huntsville, Alabama, U.S.
- Education: Bachelor's degree in aeronautical engineering at Purdue University
- Occupations: Director of the Marshall Space Flight Center

Gene Porter Bridwell (October 4, 1935 – August 4, 2016) was the seventh director of the NASA Marshall Space Flight Center located in Huntsville, Alabama. He served as director from January 6, 1994, to February 3, 1996.

Before becoming director of the Marshall Center, G.P. (Porter) Bridwell served as manager of the Heavy Lift Launch Vehicle Definition Office, where he supervised efforts involving the proposed vehicle's design, development, and integration. He also served on special assignment with the Space Station Redesign Team and later the U.S./Russian Space Station Integration Team. Previously, he served as manager of the Shuttle Projects Office. There he managed the Shuttle's propulsion elements, including the Space Shuttle Main Engine, External Tank, Redesigned Solid Rocket Motor, Solid Rocket Booster, Advanced Solid Rocket Motor, and related systems and activities, including the Michoud Assembly Facility.

Bridwell was born in Linton, Indiana, on October 4, 1935, and graduated from State High School in Terre Haute, Indiana, in 1953. He earned a Bachelor of Science degree in aeronautical engineering in 1958 from Purdue University, West Lafayette, Indiana. He began his professional career as an engineer with Rocketdyne in Canoga Park, California. He joined the Marshall Center in 1962, and his early experience included assignments within the former Saturn Systems Office and Saturn V Program Office. In 1975, he transferred to the Shuttle Projects Office and served in key positions including chief of the Project Engineering Office, and deputy manager of the External Tank Project. In February 1983, he was appointed manager of the External Tank Project.

In the spring of 1987, he served temporarily as acting deputy center director of National Space Technology Laboratories in Mississippi. He was appointed director of institutional and program support at the Marshall Center in October 1988, and assumed the position of manager, Shuttle Projects Office, in May 1989.

In January 1990, Bridwell became the director of National Launch Systems for NASA Headquarters, co-located at the Marshall Center. In February 1992, he was officially transferred back to the Marshall Center from headquarters, where he assumed his post as manager of the Heavy Lift Launch Vehicle Definition Office.

Bridwell died in Huntsville, Alabama on August 4, 2016, at the age of 80.
