= Alana Hawley Purvis =

Canadian actress

Alana Hawley Purvis, sometimes credited as Alana Hawley, is a Canadian actress from Vancouver, British Columbia. She is most noted for her performance as Frankie in the 2021 film Range Roads, for which she received a Canadian Screen Award nomination for Best Actress at the 10th Canadian Screen Awards in 2022.

She previously appeared in The Valley Below, a 2014 film by Range Roads director Kyle Thomas.

== Filmography ==
=== Film ===
Year	Title	Role	Notes
2014	The Valley Below	Jill	
2016	The Great Fear	Meryl	
2021	Range Roads	Frankie	
2024	Death in the Cul-De-Sac	Sarah	

=== Television ===
Year	Title	Role	Notes
2021	Supergirl	Dana Ford	Episode: "Magical Thinking"
2021	A Mrs. Miracle Christmas	Principal Hyde	Television film
2022	Love for Starters	Nancy	Television film
2022	Listen out for Love	Olivia	Television film
2022	Charmed	Lamia	Episode: "Unlucky Charmed"
2025	Tracker	Officer Shonda Crosby	Episode: "Eat the Rich"
TBA	The Loving Spoonful	Anna	Television film
