= Tiffany Helm =

American and Canadian actress

- Born: 1964 (age 61–62)
- Occupation: Actress
- Years active: 1980–present
- Parent(s): Brooke Bundy; Peter Helm

Tiffany Helm (born 1964) is an American and Canadian film and television actress. Her best known role was in the 1985 horror film Friday the 13th: A New Beginning as Violet Moraine. She also starred in The Zoo Gang (1985) and Reform School Girls (1986) a B movie spoof of women in prison films.

== Early life and career ==
Born in 1964, Helm is the daughter of actors Brooke Bundy and Peter Helm.

Helm has also made guest appearances on TV shows such as Bare Essence, You Again?, 21 Jump Street, and Freddy's Nightmares. Helm studied dance with Roland Dupree and was a member of the Beverly Hills Mime Troupe.

In 2018, after a career hiatus of more than 20 years, Helm returned to acting, appearing in films such as In the Tall Grass, Red Letter Day, 13 Fanboy, and Come True.

== Filmography ==
- Likely Stories, Vol. 3 (1983) as Cissy
- Hard to Hold (1984) as Fan #2
- O.C. and Stiggs (1985) as Charlotte
- Friday the 13th: A New Beginning (1985) as Violet Moraine
- The Zoo Gang (1985) as Kate Haskell
- Reform School Girls (1986) as Andrea 'Fish' Eldridge
- Freddy's Nightmares (1989) (TV) as Waitress Mary
- Sworn to Vengeance (1993) (TV)
- Rama (1996) (VG) as Francesca Sabatini
- In the Tall Grass (2019) as Gas Station Attendant
- Red Letter Day (2019) as Nicole Morris
- Come True (2020) as Old Woman
- 13 Fanboy (2021) as Tiffany Helm
