= The Valley Below =

- Directed by: Kyle Thomas
- Written by: Kyle Thomas
- Produced by: Alexander Carson; Cameron Macgowan; Kyle Thomas
- Starring: Kris Demeanor; Stephen Bogaert; Mikaela Cochrane; Alejandro Rae
- Cinematography: Mike McLaughlin
- Edited by: Kyle Thomas
- Music by: Kris Demeanor; Gavin Gardiner; Dan Mangan; Eamon McGrath; Rae Spoon
- Production company: North Country Cinema
- Distributed by: A71 Entertainment
- Release date: September 7, 2014 (TIFF)
- Running time: 87 minutes
- Country: Canada
- Language: English

The Valley Below is a 2014 Canadian drama film. The feature film debut of filmmaker Kyle Thomas, the film consists of four interrelated stories taking place in the badlands around Drumheller, Alberta. The film was produced by the North Country Cinema media arts collective based out of Calgary, Alberta.

The individual stories centre on Kate (Mikaela Cochrane), a young woman preparing to attend college who discovers that she is pregnant just before leaving on a camping trip with her boyfriend Henry (Joe Perry); Warren (Kris Demeanor), a zamboni driver at the local hockey rink and an aspiring musician who is struggling with alcoholism; Gordon (Stephen Bogaert), a shy and reclusive taxidermist dealing with his failing marriage with Susan (Lori Ravensborg); and Barry (Alejandro Rae), a police officer and part-time local radio host who is looking to start a family with his partner Jill (Alana Hawley).

Each of the four segments features a score by a different Canadian musician. Rae Spoon, Dan Mangan, Eamon McGrath and Gavin Gardiner composed the music.

The film garnered two Canadian Screen Award nominations at the 3rd Canadian Screen Awards, in the categories of Best Supporting Actor for Demeanor and Best Original Song for Mangan's song "Wants". The film received largely positive critical attention from the Canadian media, including The National Post calling it a "superb first feature".
