= Hey, Viktor! =

2023 Canadian comedy film

- Film poster
- Directed by: Cody Lightning
- Written by: Cody Lightning; Samuel Miller
- Produced by: Sara Corry; Blake McWilliam; Samuel Miller; Kyle Thomas
- Starring: Cody Lightning; Hannah Cheesman; Adam Beach
- Cinematography: Liam Mitchell
- Edited by: Sarah Taylor
- Production companies: Lightning Mill; North Country Cinema
- Distributed by: Visit Films levelFILM
- Release dates: June 8, 2023 (Tribeca); September 8, 2023 (TIFF)
- Running time: 102 minutes
- Country: Canada
- Language: English

Hey, Viktor! is a 2023 Canadian mockumentary comedy film directed by Cody Lightning and written by Lightning and Samuel Miller.

The film stars Lightning as a fictionalized version of himself, 25 years after his breakthrough role as the young Victor in Smoke Signals. With his career having faded to the point that the only roles his manager Kate (Hannah Cheesman) can offer to him anymore are gay porn films and pro-fracking commercials for petrochemical companies, he hits upon a scheme to revive his career by creating and starring in his own Smoke Signals sequel if only he can convince Adam Beach to participate in it.

The cast also includes Simon Baker, Conway Kootenay, Gary Farmer, Irene Bedard, Colin Mochrie, Phil Burke, Teneil Whiskeyjack, Peter Craig Robinson, Roseanne Supernault, Arik Pipestem, Matthew Alden and Alayna Edwards.

== Distribution ==
The film premiered on June 8, 2023, at the Tribeca Film Festival, and had its Canadian premiere at the 2023 Toronto International Film Festival. It was screened as the closing film of the 2023 ImagineNATIVE Film and Media Arts Festival, and was theatrically released in Canada in spring 2024.

== Reception ==
The film was named to TIFF's annual Canada's Top Ten list for 2023.

=== Critical response ===
Vanessa Sanginiti of Exclaim! rated the film 7 out of 10, writing that "Lightning and co-writer Samuel Miller use the mockumentary format incredibly carefully. Parody is innate to Hey, Viktor!, as the German obsession with Indigenous culture, child actors and 'pretendians' are all satirized here. Of course, satire is almost always key in mockumentaries, but there needs to be care taken with characters in a film that focuses on sobriety, making amends, navigating acting as an Indigenous person, and letting go of the past. Lightning’s presence as actor, co-writer and director allow him to apply this care to the mockumentary format without making everything one big joke."

Richard Crouse gave the film three and a half stars and wrote, "Funny and absurd, but with an undercurrent of reality that grounds the heartfelt moments, it delivers laughs and some bittersweet moments. Make no mistake, this is a comedy, first and foremost, and a raunchy one at that, but as it works its way to the end, it careens through a dysfunctional journey of self-discovery."

=== Awards ===
The film was shortlisted for the 2023 Jean-Marc Vallée DGC Discovery Award.

At the 2023 Calgary International Film Festival, the film received a special jury citation from the RBC Emerging Canadian Artist award jury.

At imagineNative, it won the award for Best Dramatic Feature.

The film received three Canadian Screen Award nominations at the 12th Canadian Screen Awards in 2024, for Best Lead Performance in a Comedy Film (Lightning), Best Supporting Performance in a Comedy Film (Cheesman) and Best Original Screenplay (Lightning, Miller).
